= List of historical films set in Near Eastern and Western civilization =

Historical drama, or period drama is a film genre in which stories are based upon historical events and notable people. Some historical dramas are docudramas, which attempt to accurately portray a historical event or biography to the degree the available historical research will allow. Other historical dramas are fictionalized tales that are based on an actual person and their deeds, such as Braveheart, which is loosely based on the 13th-century knight William Wallace's fight for Scottish independence.

Historical fantasy includes films that place legendary or historical figures into stylized or supernatural worlds while remaining rooted in a specific era of human history. Examples include 300, which blends ancient Greek history with mythology, or Robin Hood: Prince of Thieves, which reimagines the legendary heroic figure in a stylized medieval setting. The genre also frequently incorporates Biblical epics such as Noah or Exodus: Gods and Kings. This sub-genre is distinct from pure fantasy (such as The Lord of the Rings or Conan the Barbarian).

Due to the sheer volume of films included in this genre and the interest in continuity, this list is primarily focused on films about the history of Near Eastern and Western civilization.

Please also refer to the List of historical films set in Asia for films about the history of East Asia, Central Asia, and South Asia.

== Films set in the Stone Age (before 3300 BC) ==
Title	Release date	Time Era	Time Period	Historical background
Missing Link	1988	Lower Paleolithic	1 Mya	The struggle of the last of the Australopithecine against the rising Homo.
Quest for Fire	1981	Middle Paleolithic	80,000 BC	The story is set in Paleolithic Europe, with its plot surrounding the control of fire by archaic humans.
Out of Darkness	2022	Upper Paleolithic	43,000 BC	Humans and Neanderthals in Paleolithic Europe.
The Clan of the Cave Bear	1986	Upper Paleolithic	40,000 – 35,000 BC	Set around the time of Neanderthal extinction.
Ao: The Last Hunter	2010	Upper Paleolithic	28,000 BC	Cro-Magnons and Neanderthals in Paleolithic Asia and Europe.
Alpha	2018	Upper Paleolithic	20,000 BC	Dog domestication.
Creatures the World Forgot	1971	Paleolithic	not specified	The daily struggle to survive of a tribe of prehistoric humans.
Year One	2009	Neolithic		Comedy about two hunter-gatherers who after being banished from their tribe encounter Biblical characters and eventually wind up in the city of Sodom.
10,000 BC	2008	Neolithic	10,000 BC	Set in the prehistoric era (12,000 years ago) and depicts the journeys of a prehistoric tribe of mammoth hunters.
Iceman	2017	Neolithic	3,300 BC	Fictional story about the life of Ötzi, a natural mummy of a man found in 1991 in the Ötztal Alps.

== Films set in the Bronze Age (3300–1200 BC) ==
Title	Release date	Time period	Historical background
Gods of Egypt	2016	3200 BC	A fantasy action film based on the ancient Egyptian deities and the story of the god Horus (Horus may be shown as a falcon on the Narmer Palette, dating from about 3300–3200 BC).
The Scorpion King	2002	3200–3000 BC	A fantasy action film based on the historical king of the Protodynastic Period of Egypt, King Scorpion.
The Pharaohs' Woman	1960	3100 BC	A beautiful girl and a young physician fall in love amid a family and power struggle between rival princes of Upper and Lower Egypt. Set shortly after the unification of Upper Egypt and Lower Egypt by the First Dynasty of Egypt.
Land of the Pharaohs	1956	2589–2566 BC	Based on the reign of Pharaoh Khufu (Cheops), a member of the Fourth Dynasty of Egypt.
Cleopatra's Daughter	1960	2589–2566 BC	Based on the reign of Pharaoh Khufu (Cheops), a member of the Fourth Dynasty of Egypt.
Sudan	1945	2558–2532 BC	Set during the reign of the pharaoh Khafre (Chephren), a member of the Fourth Dynasty of Egypt.
The Scorpion King 2: Rise of a Warrior	2008	2334–2284 BC/ 1792 – c. 1750 BC	This is a fictional story about Mathayus, who aims to avenge his father's death at the hands of Sargon, now king of Akkad. In this movie, a fictional version of the king Hammurabi of Babylon appears.
The Bible: In the Beginning...	1966	approx. 3761 BC – 1644 BC (according to the Hebrew Calendar)	It recounts the first 22 chapters of the biblical Book of Genesis, covering the stories from Adam and Eve to the binding of Isaac.
Sodom and Gomorrah	1962	2100 BC	An epic film which is loosely based on the tale of the cities Sodom and Gomorrah in the Book of Genesis.
The Eloquent Peasant	1970	2160–2025 BC	Egyptian short film based on the tale of The Eloquent Peasant from the Middle Kingdom period
Abraham	1993	2100–2000 BC	A television film based on the life of the patriarch Abraham.
The Bible	2013	2100 BC – 67 AD	Television miniseries based on the Bible, starting with Abraham.
Jacob	1994	2000 BC (according to the Hebrew calendar)	A German/Italian/American television film based on the novel Giacobbe by Francesco Maria Nappi. The novel is, in turn, based on the depiction of the patriarch Jacob in the Book of Genesis.
Slave of Dreams	1995	1901–1850 BC	Set in Ancient Egypt and based on the story of Joseph, a Vizier depicted in the Book of Genesis. The era of the film's setting corresponds to the Twelfth Dynasty of Egypt.
Joseph	1995	1901–1850 BC	Set in Ancient Egypt and based on the story of Joseph, a Vizier depicted in the Book of Genesis. The era of the film's setting corresponds to the Twelfth Dynasty of Egypt.
The Red Tent	2014	1700–1750 BC	Miniseries set in The Holy Land during the time of the Old Testament patriarchs of the Book of Genesis. Dinah, the only daughter of Leah and Jacob, chronicles her story from youth through adulthood.
Atlantis: End of a World, Birth of a Legend	2011	1600 BC	Docudrama which depicts a re-enactment of the events surrounding the Minoan eruption, a major catastrophic volcanic eruption in the island of Thera (modern Santorini). The historical eruption devastated the island and communities and agricultural areas on nearby islands and Crete. The event is thought to be connected to a decline and eventual downfall of the Minoan civilization, an incident believed to have inspired the legend of Atlantis.
Atlantis	2013–2015	1600 BC	Far from home, Jason washes up on the shores of the ancient and mysterious city of Atlantis.
Queen of the Nile	1961	1370–1330 BC	Set in Ancient Egypt; loosely based on the life of Nefertiti, Great Royal Wife of the Pharaoh Akhenaten. Nefertiti and her husband were members of the Eighteenth Dynasty of Egypt and were ruling figures of the Amarna Period.
The Egyptian	1954	1350 BC	Based on the novel The Egyptian by Mika Waltari, who adapted the Story of Sinuhe. The film mentions the pharaoh Akhenaten, the Hittite Empire, and iron technology.
Tut	2015	1332–1323 BC	The three-part miniseries is based on the life of Egyptian pharaoh Tutankhamun, a member of the Eighteenth Dynasty of Egypt.
Jason and the Argonauts	1963	1300 BC	The story of Jason and Argonauts, a band of heroes in Greek mythology, who in the years before the Trojan War (around 1300 BC) accompanied Jason to Colchis in his quest to find the Golden Fleece.
The Giants of Thessaly	1960	1300 BC	loosely based on the epic poem Argonautica by Apollonius Rhodius.
The Ten Commandments	1956	1290–1213 BC	Set in Ancient Egypt, during the reign of Ramesses II, a member of the Nineteenth Dynasty of Egypt. The film is based on the founding narrative of the Exodus, as depicted in the books of Exodus, Leviticus, Numbers, and Deuteronomy.
Exodus: Gods and Kings	2014	1290–1213 BC	Set in Ancient Egypt, during the reign of Ramesses II, a member of the Nineteenth Dynasty of Egypt. The film is based on the founding narrative of the Exodus, as depicted in the books of Exodus, Leviticus, Numbers, and Deuteronomy.
The Prince of Egypt	1998	1290–1213 BC	Set in Ancient Egypt, during the reign of Ramesses II, a member of the Nineteenth Dynasty of Egypt. The film is based on the founding narrative of the Exodus, as depicted in the books of Exodus, Leviticus, Numbers, and Deuteronomy.
Immortals	2011	1228 BC	Loosely based on the Greek myth of Theseus and the Minotaur and the Titanomachy.
Iphigenia	1977	1200–1150 BC	Set in the port town of Aulis, Greece immediately before the Greek expeditionary force sets sail to attack Troy. Due to unfavorable weather conditions, king Agamemnon of Mycenae offers his daughter Iphigenia as a human sacrifice to the goddess Artemis. The film is based on the theatrical play Iphigenia in Aulis by Euripides.
Helen of Troy	1956	1200–1150 BC	Set in western Anatolia during the Trojan War, largely based on the epic poems Iliad and Odyssey by Homer.
Helen of Troy	2003	1200–1150 BC	TV miniseries set in western Anatolia during the Trojan War, loosely based on the epic poem Iliad by Homer.
Troy	2004	1200–1150 BC	Set in western Anatolia during the Trojan War, loosely based on the epic poem Iliad by Homer.
Troy: Fall of a City	2018	1200–1150 BC	Miniseries that tells the story of the 10-year siege of Troy.
The Fury of Achilles	1962	1200–1150 BC	Set in western Anatolia in the 9th year of the Trojan War, based on the epic poem Iliad by Homer. King Agamemnon of Mycenae has lost his slave concubine Chryseis, and demands Briseis as a replacement concubine. Briseis is the slave concubine of Achilles, the leader of the Myrmidons, and Achilles feels insulted due to having to give her up to his superior. In retaliation, Achilles refuses to fight or lead his troops alongside the other Greek forces. The Trojans temporarily start gaining an advantage in the ongoing war.
The Trojan Horse	1961	1200–1150 BC	Set in western Anatolia in the 10th and final year of the Trojan War.
The Trojan Women	1971	1200–1150 BC	Set in the immediate aftermath of the Trojan War, based on the theatrical play The Trojan Women by Euripides. The city of Troy has been sacked and the victors of the war are taking decisions on the fates of surviving captives. The film focuses on the fates of female captives Hecuba, Andromache, Cassandra, and Helen of Sparta. Meanwhile, Astyanax, the underage heir to the Trojan throne and relative of all four women, is scheduled for execution.
Ulysses	1954	1200–1150 BC	Set in the aftermath of the Trojan War, based on the epic poem Odyssey by Homer. It depicts the ten-year struggle of war veteran Odysseus to return home to the island of Ithaca following the war.
The Odyssey	1968	1200–1150 BC	Based on the epic poem Odyssey by Homer.
The Odyssey	1997	1200–1150 BC	Set in the aftermath of the Trojan War, based on the epic poem Odyssey by Homer. It depicts the ten-year struggle of war veteran Odysseus to return home to the island of Ithaca following the war.
The Odyssey	2026	1200–1150 BC	Set in the aftermath of the Trojan War, based on the epic poem Odyssey by Homer. It depicts the ten-year struggle of war veteran Odysseus to return home to the island of Ithaca following the war.
Electra	1962	1200–1150 BC	Set in the aftermath of the Trojan War in Mycenae, based on the theatrical play Electra by Euripides and the traditional accounts of conflicts within the family of the Atreidai. Agamemnon, King of Mycenae returned victorious from the Trojan War, but was assassinated by his own wife Clytemnestra and by his first cousin Aegisthus (who served as Clytemnestra's lover and a rival claimant to the throne). Years later Electra (the daughter of Agamemnon and Clytemnestra) seeks revenge for her father's murder, by plotting the assassinations of both her mother and her stepfather.
The Lion of Thebes	1964	1200–1150 BC	Alternate tale where Helen of Troy ends up in the Egyptian city of Thebes
The Avenger	1962	1200–1150 BC	Aeneas struggles to establish a new home-land in the Italian Peninsula for his fellow survivors of the Trojan War. The film is based on the epic poem Aeneid by Virgil, which depicts Aeneas and his Trojan colonists as ancestor of the Romans.

== Films set in the Iron Age (1200 BC–500 BC) ==
Title	Release date	Time period	Notes on setting
Samson and Delilah	1949	1118–1078 BC	A romantic biblical drama film which depicts the story of Samson, a strongman whose secret lies in his uncut hair, and his love for Delilah, the woman who seduces him. Samson and Delilah are characters in the Book of Judges, where Samson is depicted as the last of the Biblical judges in its narrative, and Delilah as a woman of Nahal Sorek who was bribed by the lords of the Philistines to learn his secrets.
Samson	2018	1118–1078 BC	Samson is a 2018 Biblical drama film directed by Bruce Macdonald and inspired by the story of Samson in the Book of Judges.
Pharaoh	1966	1069 BC	Set in Ancient Egypt during the reign of a fictitious king "Ramses XIII" (there were only 11 kings by that name). The film is based on the novel Pharaoh by Bolesław Prus, and depicts the final years of the historical Twentieth Dynasty of Egypt. Ramses XIII rises to the throne when still in his 20s, following the deaths of his father, and the incapacitating illnesses and (one suicide) of a number of older brothers. Egypt is in decline due to a combination of internal and external threats, and Ramses is pushing for necessary reforms but his efforts are resisted by the powerful, bureaucratic priesthood. Ramses dies young, before accomplishing his goals. His political rival "Herhor" (the historical Herihor) succeeds him on the throne and attempts some of the same reforms, but still fails to rescue Egypt from its decline.
King David	1985	1040–970 BC	Set in Late Canaan, it depicts the life and reign of David, Kings of Israel. Based on the Books of Samuel. David is the supposed founder of the House of David (Davidic line).
A Story of David	1960	1040–970 BC	Set in Late Canaan, it depicts the complex relationship between Saul, Kings of Israel and his son-in-law and eventual successor David. Based on the Books of Samuel, where Saul is depicted as the founder of the Kingdom of Israel.
David and Goliath	1960	1040–970 BC	Set in the Canaan, focused on the conflict between rival kings Saul and Asrod, and their representatives in champion warfare: David and Goliath of Gath. Based on the Books of Samuel, which depict Achish as a king of Gath who was in conflict with Saul and recruited David to serve in his army.
David and Bathsheba	1951	1040–970 BC	Set in Late Canaan, during the reign of David, Kings of Israel. David is married to Michal, daughter of his predecessor Saul. David has an extramarital affair with Bathsheba, wife of the soldier Uriah the Hittite. Uriah is one of David's Mighty Warriors (a group of soldiers personally loyal to David), but David arranges for Uriah to be killed in battle and then claims Bathsheba as his new wife. Based on the Books of Samuel.
The Queen of Sheba	1952	1011–931 BC	Set in the Kingdom of Israel, during the reign of Solomon.
Solomon and Sheba	1959	1011–931 BC	Set in the Kingdom of Israel, during the reign of Solomon, Kings of Israel. Solomon forms a political alliance with the Queen of Sheba, becomes a lover of his new ally, and introduces pagan rituals in his kingdom. His exiled half-brother Adonijah offers his military services to Ancient Egypt and leads an Egyptian army in an invasion of Kingdom of Israel. The events of the film are loosely based on narratives from the Books of Kings and the Books of Chronicles. The Books of Kings depict Adonijah and Solomon as sons of David and rival claimants to the throne of Israel, but do not feature Adonijah as loyal to Egypt. Instead, Solomon himself is traditionally depicted as an ally of Egypt and as husband of a Pharaoh's daughter.
Sins of Jezebel	1953	874–853 BC	Set in the Kingdom of Northern Israel in Samaria, during the reign of Ahab, Kings of Israel. The film depicts the reign of the Omrides, based on Books of Kings and the Books of Chronicles. Jezebel, Ahab's queen consort, is depicted as having an extramarital affair with the military commander Jehu. This contradicts the traditional narrative, where Jezebel never has extramarital affairs and where she is assassinated by Jehu during the coup d'état which elevated him to the throne.
I Am Semiramis	1963	810 BC	Set in the Neo-Assyrian Empire, during the reign of semi-legendary queen Semiramis. The legends are in part based on the historical Shammuramat, queen consort of Shamshi-Adad V and regent for her son Adad-nirari III.
King Lear (many adaptations)	1905–	800 BC	Celtic Britain
Romulus	2020–2022	800 BC	Set in the 8th century BC, narrates the events preceding the founding of Rome.
Duel of the Titans	1961	753 BC	Based on the story of Romulus and Remus, and the founding of the city of Rome and the Roman Kingdom.
The First King: Birth of an Empire	2019	753 BC	Set in the 8th century BC, it is about the shepherd brothers Romulus and Remus and the founding of Rome.
Romulus and the Sabines	1961	750 BC	Based on the Rape of the Sabine Women, an origin myth for the Roman Kingdom. Shortly after the founding of the kingdom and the start of the reign of Romulus, Rome still lacks a female population and its residents can not reproduce. Romulus organizes bride kidnappings from neighboring people, primarily targeting the Sabines. This leads to a war between the Roman and Sabines, and the eventual assimilation of the Sabines by the Romans.
The Rape of the Sabine Women	1962	750 BC	Adaptation of the Roman foundation myth about the abduction of Sabine women by the Romans shortly after the foundation of the city of Rome.
Head of a Tyrant	1959	668-627 BC	Set in the Neo-Assyrian Empire during the rule of Ashurbanipal. Based on the Book of Judith
Duel of Champions	1961	650 BC	Based on the Roman legend of the Horatii, set in the reign of Tullus Hostilius. The Roman Kingdom is at war with the city of Alba Longa and the outcome will by decided by champion warfare. Rome sends three brothers from gens Horatia and Alba Longa sends three brothers from gens Curiatia gens. Publius Horatius emerges as the sole survivor of the combat, and Alba Longa is annexed by the Roman Kingdom.
War Gods of Babylon	1962	627 BC	Set in the Neo-Assyrian Empire; focusing largely on Sardanapalus (probably the Greek name for Ashurbanipal, but anachronistically including Zoroaster (11th–10th century BC) and Hammurabi (1792–1750 BC).
Jeremiah (film)	1998	622-605 BC	The film depicts Jeremiah's journey as a young man chosen by God to deliver a message of repentance to the people of the Kingdom of Judah. At the same time the expansionist race of the Neo-Babylonian Empire during the rule of king Nebuchadnezzar II. Based on the Book of Jeremiah
The Book of Daniel	2013	605 BC	In 605 B.C. Jerusalem was conquered by the Babylonians and many of their best young men were taken into captivity, including Daniel.
The Queen of Babylon	1954	600 BC	Set in the Neo-Babylonian Empire, depicts Semiramis as a Babylonian queen.
The Warrior Empress	1960	600 BC	Features a loose portrayal of the Archaic Greek poet Sappho
Tomyris	2019	600 – 530 BC	The film is based on the story of Herodotus about the death of the Persian King Cyrus the Great during the war with Massagetae, which was commanded by the queen Tomiris.
The Beast of Babylon Against the Son of Hercules	1963	539 BC	A fictionalized account of the downfall of the Neo-Babylonian Empire and its conquest by the Achaemenid Empire under the Cyrus the Great. The cruel Balthazar (Belshazzar) has usurped the Babylonian throne and rules through state terrorism. He systematically offers young women as human sacrifice to his gods. Nippur, a descendant of former king Sargon II, fails to stop the usurper on his own. His life is saved by Zairus (Cyrus the Great) and he agrees to help the Persian king in his campaign to conquer Babylon. The historical Belshazzar was a son of king Nabonidus and served as a regent in his father's absence, but never became a king in his own right. During Cyrus' conquest, Nabonidus was captured and his life apparently spared, but Belshazzar may have died during the fall of the city.
Hero of Rome	1964	509 BC	The story combines the Roman legends of Gaius Mucius Scaevola and the expulsion of king Lucius Tarquinius Superbus. In the film, Lucius Tarquinius Superbus has already been deposed, and the Roman Kingdom has been replaced by a Roman Republic. Lars Porsena, King of Clusium wages war against the Republic in an attempt to restore his ally Tarquinius to the throne. The Roman Senate offers the military leadership to Gaius Mucius Scaevola, a recently released prisoner of war whose right hand is permanently disabled. Scaevola trains himself to fight with his left hand, and leads his troops to victory against Lars Porsena.
Coriolanus: Hero without a Country	1964	493 BC	The Roman legend of Gaius Marcius Coriolanus. Coriolanus is a Roman general who distinguishes himself in a war between the Roman Republic and the Volsci. When the aristocratic Coriolanus proposes political reforms which will severely reduce the rights of the plebs, most of the Romans turn against him and he is exiled. The vengeful Coriolanus offers his military services to the Volsci, and leads an invasion army against Rome. Coriolanus refuses requests for a peaceful resolution by his former countrymen, but changes his mind when the Romans send his own mother and his wife as their representatives.

== Films set in the Classical Era (500 BC – 600 AD) ==
Title	Release date	Time period	Historical background
The Giant of Marathon	1959	490 BC	Greece: Battle of Marathon
Esther and the King	1960	486–482 BC	the biblical story of Esther set in the Achaemenid Empire
One Night with the King	2006	486–482 BC	the biblical story of Esther set in the Achaemenid Empire
The 300 Spartans	1961	480 BC	Greece: Battle of Thermopylae
300	2007	480 BC	Greece: Battle of Thermopylae
300: Rise of an Empire	2014	480 BC	Greece: Battle of Salamis
Amazons of Rome	1961	476 BC	Based on the legend of Cloelia
Damon and Pythias	1962	400 BC	Syracuse, Sicily
Socrates	1971	399 BC	A false accusation leads the philosopher Socrates to trial and condemnation in 5th century BC Athens.
Brennus, Enemy of Rome	1963	387 BC	the Gallic sack of Rome
Hercules	2014	358 BC	An American action fantasy adventure film based on the graphic novel Hercules: The Thracian Wars, which presents a realistic and more human version of Hercules.
Alexander the Great	1956	356–323 BC	Ancient kingdom of Macedonia and Persia
Alexander	2004	356–323 BC	Ancient kingdom of Macedonia and Persia
The Goddess of Love	1957	339–338 BC	Athens during the campaigns of Philip II
The Cleopatras	1983	305–30 BC	Egypt – The entire Ptolemaic dynasty
The Colossus of Rhodes	1961	280 BC	Fictional account of the island of Rhodes during its Classical period in the late third century before coming under Roman control
Gladiators Seven	1964	280 BC	Sparta during the Achaean League
The Loves of Salammbo	1960	241–237 BC	loosely based on the novel Salammbô by Gustave Flaubert.
Revak the Rebel	1960	218 BC	Iberian Peninsula immediately before the Second Punic War
Cabiria	1914 (silent)	218–202 BC	during the Second Punic War
Jupiter's Darling	1955	218–202 BC	during the Second Punic War
Hannibal	1959	218–202 BC	during the Second Punic War
Hannibal – Rome's Worst Nightmare	2006	218–202 BC	during the Second Punic War
Siege of Syracuse	1960	214–212 BC	the Roman Siege of Syracuse during the Second Punic War
Scipio Africanus: The Defeat of Hannibal	1937	202 BC	Battle of Zama which ended the Second Punic War
Scipio the African	1971	185 BC	About the later life of Scipio.
The Old Testament	1962	167–141 BC	based on the Maccabean Revolt against the Seleucid Empire
Carthage in Flames	1960	149–146 BC	Depicts the last of the Punic Wars between the Roman Republic and Carthage.
The Centurion	1961	146 BC	Battle of Corinth between Rome and the Achaean League
Ancient Rome: The Rise and Fall of an Empire	2006	146 BC–410 AD	From Tiberius Gracchus to the Sack of Rome (410). BBC Docu-drama.
Julius Caesar	2002	100–44 BC	a bio-pic of Julius Caesar, not the Shakespeare play about his death and the aftermath
Burebista	1980	82–44 BC	The reign of King Burebista of Dacia (modern day Romania)
Julius Caesar Against the Pirates	1962	75 BC	loosely based on actual events from the early life of Julius Caesar.
Sins of Rome	1953	73–71 BC	the Third Servile War in Rome
Spartacus and the Ten Gladiators	1964	73–71 BC	the Third Servile War in Rome
Spartacus	1960	73–71 BC	the Third Servile War in Rome
Spartacus	2004	73–71 BC	the Third Servile War in Rome
Spartacus	2010–2013	73–71 BC	the Third Servile War in Rome
The Revenge of Spartacus	1965	70 BC	set shortly after the death of Spartacus
Caesar the Conqueror	1962	58–50 BC	Julius Caesar leads the Roman army to battle against rebels in Gaul.
Slave of Rome	1961	58–50 BC	Set in Gaul during the Gallic Wars
Druids	2001	58–51 BC	the struggle between Julius Caesar and Vercingetorix in the Gallic Wars
Giants of Rome	1964	52 BC	The film involves a group of soldiers infiltrating the enemy's stronghold to locate and destroy a secret weapon prior to the Battle of Alesia.
Rome	2005–2007	52–30 BC	from the end of the Gallic Wars to the death of Mark Antony and the beginning of the Principate
Imperium: Augustus	2003	49 BC–14 AD	Rome – the life of Augustus, the first emperor
Revolt of the Barbarians	1964	49 BC	Rome – shortly after the Gallic Wars
The Slave	1962	48 BC	Unofficial sequel to Stanley Kubrick's 1960 film Spartacus
A Queen for Caesar	1962	48 BC	Egypt leading up to the arrival of Julius Caesar
Caesar and Cleopatra	1945	48–47 BC	Egypt during the stay of Julius Caesar
Cleopatra	1917	48–30 BC	Egypt and Rome – follows her relationships first with Julius Caesar and then with Mark Antony
Cleopatra	1934	48–30 BC	Egypt and Rome – follows her relationships first with Julius Caesar and then with Mark Antony
Cleopatra	1963	48–30 BC	Egypt and Rome – follows her relationships first with Julius Caesar and then with Mark Antony
Cleopatra	1999	48–30 BC	Egypt and Rome – follows her relationships first with Julius Caesar and then with Mark Antony
Julius Caesar (many adaptations)	1908–	44–42 BC	Shakespeare's play about the death and aftermath of this famous dictator
Antony and Cleopatra (many adaptations)	1908–	44–30 BC	Shakespeare's play about the relationship between Cleopatra and Mark Antony
Legions of the Nile	1959	44–30 BC	Egypt during the reign of Cleopatra and Mark Antony
Two Nights with Cleopatra	1954	44–30 BC	Egypt during the reign of Cleopatra and Mark Antony
Serpent of the Nile	1953	44–30 BC	Tells the story of the Egyptian Queen Cleopatra and her relationship with the Roman general Mark Anthony from just after the assassination of Julius Caesar.
Empire	2005	44 BC	Covers the struggle of a young Octavius to become the first emperor of Rome.
Domina	2021–2023	43–22 BC	The life and rise of Livia Drusilla, the powerful wife of the Roman emperor Augustus Caesar.
Herod the Great	1959	37–4 BC	Herodian Kingdom of Judea during the reign of Herod the Great
The Cantabrians	1980	29 BC	About the Cantabrian Wars during the final stage of the two-century long Roman conquest of Hispania.
The Caesars	1967	27 BC–68 AD	Rome – the Julio-Claudian dynasty
Mary (2024 film)	2024	18 - 4 BC	A 2 epic biblical film that follows Mary, mother of Jesus, from her childhood in Nazareth to the birth of Jesus, during the reign of Herod the Great.
I, Claudius	1976	12 BC–54 AD	Rome – the reigns and family life of the Julio-Claudians
The Nativity Story	2006	4 BC	Province of Judaea – The Biblical account of the nativity of Jesus, following the story of Mary and Joseph until the birth of Jesus occurs.
Desert Desperadoes	1959	4 BC	Province of Judaea – during the reign of Herod the Great
King of Kings	1961	4 BC to 30–33 AD	Province of Judaea – Dramatization of the story of Jesus of Nazareth from his birth and ministry to his crucifixion and resurrection.
The Greatest Story Ever Told	1965	4 BC to 30-33 AD	Judea (Roman province) - The life of Jesus Christ
Jesus of Nazareth	1977	4 BC to 30–33 AD	Province of Judaea – the life of Jesus Christ
The Sword and the Cross	1958	4 BC to 30–33 AD	Province of Judaea – the relationship between Maria Magdalene and Jesus Christ
Salome	1953	4 BC to 30–33 AD	Province of Judaea – during the reign of Herod II (son of Herod the Great) and princess Herodias
Monty Python's Life of Brian	1979	6-4 BC to 30 AD	Province of Judaea - Comedy parodying religious dogmatism, revolutionary groups and 1970s British left-wing politics through a man who lived his life parallel to Jesus.
Massacre in the Black Forest	1967	9 AD	Germany – The Battle of the Teutoburg Forest, where the Cherusci ambushed and annihilated three Roman legions.
Barbarians	2020-2022	9 AD	Series is a fictional account of events during the Roman Empire's occupation of Germania, and the resulting rebellion of the Germanic tribes led by Arminius.
Ben-Hur	1959	26–30 AD	Based on the 1880 novel Ben-Hur: A Tale of the Christ by Lew Wallace
Ben-Hur	2016	26–30 AD	Based on the 1880 novel Ben-Hur: A Tale of the Christ by Lew Wallace
The Last Temptation of Christ	1988	27–30 AD	Province of Judaea – the life of Jesus Christ
The Robe	1953	30–36	Rome – ending reign of Tiberius, the beginning of Caligula
Pontius Pilate	1962	33 AD	Province of Judaea – The events surrounding the Passion of Jesus Christ focusing on Pontius Pilate.
The Passion of the Christ	2004	33 AD	Province of Judaea – The final 12 hours of Jesus Christ's life
Risen	2016	33 AD	Province of Judaea – Immediately after Jesus' crucifixion
Barabbas	1961	33–64	Rome – ending reign of Tiberius, the reign of Nero
Imperium: Saint Peter	2005	33–67	Saint Peter
A.D. The Bible Continues	2015	33–41	Beginning with the crucifixion and resurrection of Jesus, and continues with the first ten chapters of the Book of Acts.
The Inquiry	2006	37	Province of Judaea - shortly after the death of Jesus
Caligula	1979	37–41	Rome – the reign of the third emperor
Caligula... The Untold Story	1982	41	Rome – the end of Caligula's reign
Demetrius and the Gladiators	1954	41	Ancient Rome – the end of Caligula's reign
Messalina	1951	41–48	Rome – about the reign of Messalina and Claudius
Messalina	1960	41–48	Rome – about the reign of Messalina and Claudius
Nero	2004	41–68	Rome – spanning the reigns of Claudius and Nero
Britannia	2018–2021	43	Set in AD 43, the series follows the Roman conquest of Britain
St. Thomas	1975	52–72	Rome – low budget Indian film on the missionary work of Thomas the Apostle in India.
Quo Vadis	1951	54–68	Rome during the reign of Nero
Quo Vadis	1985	54–68	Rome during the reign of Nero
Quo Vadis	2001	54–68	Rome during the reign of Nero
Nero and the Burning of Rome	1953	54–68	Rome during the reign of Nero
Nero's Mistress	1956	55	depicts a visit by the Roman Emperor Nero and his entourage to a coastal villa.
The Viking Queen	1967	60	Britain – loosely based on the revolt of Boudica
Boudica	2003	60	Britain – a rebellion shortly after the area had been conquered by Rome
Boudica	2023	60	Britain – a rebellion shortly after the area had been conquered by Rome
Pompeii	2014	62–79	Pompeii in the days leading up to the eruption of Mount Vesuvius
The Sign of the Cross	1932	64	Persecution of the Christians immediately after the Great Fire of Rome
Fire Over Rome	1965	65	Rome during the reign of Nero
Alone Against Rome	1962	66	Rome during the reign of Nero
The Ten Gladiators	1963	68	Rome during the reign of Nero
Challenge of the Gladiator	1965	68	Rome during the reign of Nero
The Dovekeepers	2015	70	In 79 AD, Rome is under the leadership of the elderly Emperor Vespasian, along with his sons, Titus and Domitianus. They are working on building the Colosseum
Masada	1981	72–73	Roman province of Judea during the First Jewish–Roman War
Those About to Die	2024	79	Rome during the reign of Vespasian
The Last Days of Pompeii	1950	79	Pompeii in the days leading up to the eruption of Mount Vesuvius
The Last Days of Pompeii	1959	79	Pompeii in the days leading up to the eruption of Mount Vesuvius
79 A.D.	1962	79	Pompeii in the days leading up to the eruption of Mount Vesuvius
Pompeii: The Last Day	2003	79	Docu-drama that tells of the eruption of Mount Vesuvius on 24 August 79 AD
Dacii	1967	86–87	Dacia (modern Romania) – Domitian's Dacian War
The Apocalypse	2002	90–96	Rome – Ephesus
Revolt of the Praetorians	1964	96	Rome – the assassination of Domitian
Gold for the Caesars	1963	96	Rome – During the reign of Domitian
The Column	1968	105–106	the Roman emperor Trajan conquering Dacia
Centurion	2010	117	Roman Britain – the supposed fate of the Ninth Legion
Le schiave di Cartagine	1956	120	Set in Tarsus, in the Roman province of Cilicia
The Eagle	2011	140	Roman Britain – a young Roman man attempts to find out what happened to his father and the Ninth Legion
Androcles and the Lion	1952	161	Rome – Based on the 1912 George Bernard Shaw play of the same name.
The Two Gladiators	1964	180–192	Rome during the reign of Commodus
The Rebel Gladiators	1962	180–192	Rome during the reign of Commodus
The Fall of the Roman Empire	1964	180–192	Rome during the reign of Commodus
Gladiator	2000	180–192	Rome – spanning the reigns of Marcus Aurelius and Commodus
Sword of the Empire	1964	190	Rome during the reign of Commodus
Gladiator II	2024	200	Rome during the joint reign of Carcarella and Geta which later becomes the brief reign of Macrinus.
Three Swords for Rome	1964	222	Rome during the reign of Elagabalus
The Magnificent Gladiator	1964	260–268	Rome during the reign of Gallienus
Sheba and the Gladiator	1959	260–273	Rome and the Palmyrene Empire during the reigns of Aurelian and Zenobia
Santa Barbara	2012	273–306	Rome the story of Saint Barbara, a Christian martyr
Sebastiane	1976	288	Rome Low-budget homo-erotic film about Saint Sebastian
Constantine and the Cross	1962	306–312	Rome's first Christian emperor from the death of Constantius Chlorus to the Battle of the Milvian Bridge
Katherine of Alexandria	2012	307	Roman province of Egypt shortly before the legalization of Christianity
Fabiola	1949	312	Rome early in the reign of Constantine I
The Revolt of the Slaves	1960	312	Rome early in the reign of Constantine I
The Fall of Rome	1963	337	Rome based on the persecution of Christians after the death of Emperor Constantine
Augustine: The Decline of the Roman Empire	2010	354–430	Roman province of Africa – focusing on the life of Augustine of Hippo, and including the Vandal conquest of Carthage
Agora	2009	360–415	Life and death of scientist/philosopher Hypatia of Alexandria and the destruction of the Library.
St. Patrick: The Irish Legend	2000	387–493	Ireland and Roman Britain during the life of Saint Patrick
Roar	1997	400	Ireland – Celtic warriors attempt to repel a fictitious Roman invasion
Hagbard and Signe	1967	5th century	Scandinavia during the Germanic Heroic Age
Arthur of the Britons	1972–1973	5th century	Britain after the Roman withdrawal
Sign of the Pagan	1954	406–453	Rome – the Huns conquests and the downfall of the Roman Empire
Attila	1954	406–453	Rome – the Hunnic leader up to his retreat from the Po river
Attila	2001	406–453	Rome – the life and death of the famous Hunnic leader
Revenge of the Barbarians	1960	410	the Visigothic sack of Rome
The Voyage Home	2004	415	Rome – loosely based on the 5th-century poem De reditu suo by Rutilius Claudius Namatianus
Die Nibelungen	1924	450	about the Germanic hero Siegfried, his murder, and his widow's vengeance
Die Nibelungen	1966–1967	450	about the Germanic hero Siegfried, his murder, and his widow's vengeance
Ring of the Nibelungs	2004	450	about the Germanic hero Siegfried
King Arthur	2004	452–467	the Roman withdrawal from Britain and the Battle of Mount Badon
Revenge of The Gladiators	1964	454	the Vandal sack of Rome
Tharus Son of Attila	1962	454	Set shortly after the reign of Attila
The Last Legion	2007	476–490	connecting (in heavily fictionalized fashion) the deposition of the last Roman emperor Romulus Augustus by Odoacer with the Battle of Mount Badon
The Mists of Avalon	2001	late 5th – early 6th centuries	heavily fictionalized story of King Arthur
Lovespell	1981	6th century	Britain and Ireland – adaptation of the Brythonic legend of Tristan and Iseult
Fire and Sword	1982	6th century	Britain and Ireland – adaptation of the Brythonic legend of Tristan and Iseult
Tristan & Isolde	2006	6th century	Britain and Ireland – adaptation of the Brythonic legend of Tristan and Iseult
Grendel Grendel Grendel	1981	6th century	animated film based on the 1971 novel Grendel, retelling the Anglo-Saxon poem from the monster's perspective
Beowulf & Grendel	2005	6th century	Denmark in the Germanic Heroic Age – loose adaptation of the Anglo-Saxon poem of Beowulf
Grendel	2007	6th century	Denmark in the Germanic Heroic Age – very loose adaptation of the Anglo-Saxon poem of Beowulf
Beowulf	2007	6th century	Denmark in the Germanic Heroic Age – loose adaptation of the Anglo-Saxon poem of Beowulf
Hamlet	1948	6th century	Denmark in the Germanic Heroic Age – adaptation of the Shakespeare play based on the Danish legend of Amleth
Hamlet	1964	6th century	Denmark in the Germanic Heroic Age – this is a Russian adaptation of the Shakespeare play based on the Danish legend of Amleth
Ophelia	2018	6th century	Denmark in the Germanic Heroic Age – follows the story of Hamlet from Ophelia's perspective
Prince of Jutland	1994	6th century	Denmark in the Germanic Heroic Age – legend of Amleth from the Danish Gesta Danorum
Teodora	1921	500–548	Byzantine empress Theodora
Theodora, Slave Empress	1954	500–548	Byzantine empress Theodora
The Last Roman	1968/1969	526–553	the Ostrogoths' struggle against the Byzantine emperor Justinian I and his generals Belisarius and Narses – adaption of a novel by Felix Dahn
Sword of the Conqueror	1961	567–572	Alboin and the Lombard invasion of Italy
Goliath and the Barbarians	1959	568	the Lombard invasion of Italy
The Message	1976	570–632	Arabian Peninsula – the life of Muhammad
The Messenger of God	2015	570–632	Arabian Peninsula – the life of Muhammad
Omar	2012	595–644	the life of Omar ibn Al-Khattab, one of the companions of Muhammad

== Films set in the medieval era (600–1500) ==
=== Early Middle Ages (7th–10th centuries) ===
Title	Release date	Time period	Setting	Notes
The Lady of Heaven	2021	605–632	Arabia	Biopic about Fatimah, daughter of Muhammad
681 AD: The Glory of Khan	1981	632–681	Bulgaria	Epic about the fall of Old Great Bulgaria and the creation of First Bulgarian Empire; focuses on Kanasubigi Asparuh's life
Al Qadisiyya	1981	636	Sasanian Empire	Depicts the Battle of al-Qadisiyyah
Redbad	2018	c.680–719	Frisia	A Dutch drama film based on the life of Redbad, King of the Frisians, who is often considered the last independent ruler of Frisia before Frankish domination
Outlander	2008	709	Scandinavia	Loosely based on the Anglo-Saxon epic poem Beowulf, adapted to a science-fiction backstory involving a spaceship crashing in Iron Age Norway
Charlemagne, le prince à cheval	1993	768–800	France	Charlemagne's reign up to his coronation as emperor in 800
Roland the Mighty	1956	778	France	Roland, a knight of Charlemagne's court who was killed at the Battle of Roncevaux Pass
Erik the Conqueror	1961	786–806	England	Two estranged brothers confront each other as rivals when war breaks out between Anglo-Saxon kingdoms and the Vikings.
Vikings	2013–2020	793–825	Western Europe	Series inspired by the sagas of Viking Ragnar Lothbrok, one of the best-known legendary Norse heroes and notorious as the scourge of England and France.
An Ancient Tale: When the Sun Was a God	2003	800	Poland	The death of Popiel and the rise of Piast the Wheelwright
The Gaelic King	2017	800	Scotland	Tells the story of warrior-king Alpin. When his young brother is captured, Alpin must hunt the kidnappers though a dark forest that hides an ancient evil.
Attack of the Normans	1962	early 9th century	England	Set in England during the Viking Age ("Normans" in the title being used in its original continental sense, meaning "Vikings").
Útlaginn	1981	9th century	Iceland	Adaptation of the saga of Gisli Sursson
Pope Joan	1972	9th–11th century	France, Italy	Fictitious medieval legend of a woman who disguised herself as a man and rose to the status of Pope in the Middle Ages.
Pope Joan	2009	814–855	France, Italy	Fictitious medieval legend of a woman who disguised herself as a man and rose to the status of Pope in the Middle Ages.
The Vikings	1958	860s	England	Highly fictionalized account of the death of Ragnar Lodbrok and the subsequent invasion of Northumbria by two of his sons
The Last Kingdom	2015–2022	866–920	England	Viking Age
Alfred the Great	1969	870–899	England	Alfred the Great, king of Wessex repels the army of Guthrum and begins the unification of England
A Viking Saga	2008	870s	Russia	The Rus prince Oleg of Novgorod defeats Askold and Dir
The Northman	2022	895	Scandinavia	Set in the Viking Age
The Conquest	1996	896	Hungary	About the Magyar settlement in Hungary
When the Raven Flies	1984	897	Iceland	Set in the Viking Age
Pathfinder	1987	900	Finnmark	Based on a Sami legend
In the Shadow of the Raven	1988	900	Iceland	Set in the Viking Age
The 13th Warrior	1999	922	Kievan Rus'	Blends elements of the historical account of the travels of Ahmad ibn Fadlan (AD 922), the legend of Beowulf (6th century), and the Kurosawa film Seven Samurai.
The Last Kingdom: Seven Kings Must Die	2023	924–937	England	Set in the Viking Age
The Legend of Princess Olga	1983	950–1015	Kievan Rus'	Olga of Kiev, the princess of Kievan Rus in the middle of the 10th century, the first of the Russian rulers to adopt Christianity.
Vikings: Valhalla	2022–2023	950–1066	Western Europe	Set one hundred years after the events of Vikings, the series chronicles the beginning of the end of the Viking Age, marked by the Battle of Stamford Bridge in 1066.
The Castilian	1963	930–970	Spain	Ferdinand Gonzalez: an early hero of the Spanish Reconquista
Viking	2016	976–1016	Kievan Rus'	Biopic of Vladimir I of Kiev, the ruler of the Kievan Rus', depicting his year in exile after his father's death and his subsequent rise to power
Gniazdo	1974	972	Poland	About Mieszko I of Poland
The Ceremony of Innocence	1970	978–1016	England	A fictionalized version of the reign of Æthelred the Unready
Prince Vladimir	2006	980–1015	Kievan Rus	Vladimir I of Kiev
The Long Ships	1964	982–990	Scandinavia, Africa	A vagabond Viking adventurer and a Moor both compete to find "The Mother of All Voices", a legendary golden bell near the Pillars of Hercules.
White Viking	1991	995–1000	Iceland and Norway	Set in the Viking Age during the reign of Olaf Tryggvason of Norway and his project to Christianize Norway and Iceland.
The Viking Sagas	1995	late 10th, early 11th centuries	Iceland	Borrows elements from several Icelandic sagas, most notably Laxdœla saga and Njáls saga

=== Films set in the 11th century ===
Title	Release date	Time period	Setting	Notes
The Viking	1928	1000	Norway, North America	Leif Ericson and the expedition to North America
Severed Ways	2009	1007	America	Two Scandinavians left behind in North America after the settlements made by Leif Ericson were abandoned
The Physician	2013	1021–1041	Anglo Saxon England - Kakuyid Persia	In 11th-century England, a travelling barber surgeon attempted to supply medical care to the ordinary population decided to meet the famous doctor Ibn Sina in Isfahan, the most important school for aspiring practitioners in the world at that time.
William the Conqueror	2015	1034–1066	France	the life of William of Normandy prior to the Norman Conquest
William the Conqueror	1982	1035–1066	France, England	William the Conqueror from his recognition as Duke of Normandy to his coronation as King of England
El Cid	1961	1040–1099	Spain / Kingdom of Castile	Rodrigo Díaz de Vivar, an 11th-century Spanish warrior known as El Cid
El Cid	2020–2021	1040–1099	Spain / Kingdom of Castile	Rodrigo Díaz de Vivar, an 11th-century Spanish warrior known as El Cid
Macbeth	1908	1050s	Scotland	Scottish king Mac Bethad mac Findlaích
Macbeth	1909	1050s	Scotland	Scottish king Mac Bethad mac Findlaích
Macbeth	1909	1050s	Scotland	Scottish king Mac Bethad mac Findlaích
Macbeth	1911	1050s	Scotland	Scottish king Mac Bethad mac Findlaích
Macbeth	1913	1050s	Scotland	Scottish king Mac Bethad mac Findlaích
Macbeth	1915	1050s	Scotland	Scottish king Mac Bethad mac Findlaích
The Real Thing at Last	1916	1050s	Scotland	Satirical silent movie based on the play Macbeth
Macbeth	1916	1050s	Scotland	Scottish king Mac Bethad mac Findlaích
Macbeth	1922	1050s	Scotland	Scottish king Mac Bethad mac Findlaích
Macbeth	1948	1050s	Scotland	Scottish king Mac Bethad mac Findlaích
Macbeth	1954	1050s	Scotland	Scottish king Mac Bethad mac Findlaích
Throne of Blood	1957	1050s	Japan (Scotland)	Transposes the plot of William Shakespeare's play Macbeth from Medieval Scotland to feudal Japan
Macbeth	1960	1050s	Scotland	Scottish king Mac Bethad mac Findlaích
Macbeth	1960	1050s	Scotland	Scottish king Mac Bethad mac Findlaích
Macbeth	1961	1050s	Scotland	Scottish king Mac Bethad mac Findlaích
Macbeth	1971	1050s	Scotland	Scottish king Mac Bethad mac Findlaích
Macbeth	1979	1050s	Scotland	Scottish king Mac Bethad mac Findlaích
Macbeth	1981	1050s	Scotland	Scottish king Mac Bethad mac Findlaích
Macbeth	1982	1050s	Scotland	Scottish king Mac Bethad mac Findlaích
Macbeth	1987	1050s	Scotland	Scottish king Mac Bethad mac Findlaích
Macbeth	2004	1050s	Scotland	Scottish king Mac Bethad mac Findlaích
Macbeth	2006	1050s	Scotland	Scottish king Mac Bethad mac Findlaích
Macbeth	2010	1050s	Scotland	Scottish king Mac Bethad mac Findlaích
Macbeth	2015	1050s	Scotland	Scottish king Mac Bethad mac Findlaích
The Tragedy of Macbeth	2021	1050s	Scotland	Scottish king Mac Bethad mac Findlaích
Lady Godiva of Coventry	1955	1050s	England	an English noble woman who allegedly rode naked through the streets of Coventry in protest of unfair taxation
The War Lord	1965	1060	Normandy	A Norman duke sends one of his knights to build a defensive fortress in order to guard the borders against Frisian raiders.
1066: The Battle for Middle Earth	2009	1066	England	The Norman Conquest of England through the eye of ordinary people in the village of Crowhurst
Valhalla Rising	2009	1069	Scandinavian Scotland, North America	Follows a Norse warrior named One-Eye and a boy as they travel with a band of Christian Crusaders by ship in the hopes of finding the Holy Land.
The Crusaders	1911	1096–1099	Jerusalem	Depicts the Siege of Jerusalem during the First Crusade
The Mighty Crusaders	1958	1096–1099	Jerusalem	Depicts the Siege of Jerusalem during the First Crusade
Rytsarskiy roman	2000	1096–1099	Byzantine Empire	First Crusade
The Crusaders	2001	1096–1099	Italy and the Levant	First Crusade

=== Films set in the 12th century ===
Title	Release date	Time period	Setting	Notes
Vision	2009	1098–1179	Holy Roman Empire	The life of Benedictine nun and Medieval German Roman Catholic Saint Hildegard von Bingen
Stealing Heaven	1988	1120	France	Peter Abelard and Héloïse
The Pillars of the Earth	2010	1120–1170	England	during the civil wars between King Stephen and his cousin Maud
Didgori: Land of Sacrificed Knights	2009	1121	Kingdom of Georgia	Battle of Didgori, in which Georgia's king David IV defeated the Seljuks
Destiny	1997	1126–1198	Spain	about Averroes, the 12th-century philosopher from Muslim-controlled Andalusia in Spain whose commentaries would become a staple for subsequent generations of students of Aristotle in Europe
The Devil's Crown	1978	1154–1216	England	During the reigns of Henry II, Richard I and John
Becket	1964	1155–1170	England	archbishop Thomas Becket, once a close personal friend of Henry II
The Flame and the Arrow	1950	1155–1190	Northern Italy	Dardo, a Robin Hood-like figure, and his loyal followers use a Roman ruin in Medieval Lombardy as their headquarters as they conduct an insurgency against their Hessian conquerors.
Nemanjić Dynasty: The Birth of the Kingdom	2018	1165–1227	Serbia	Serbian historical drama television series about the Serbian medieval dynasty Nemanjići
Murder in the Cathedral	1951	1170	England	Fictionalized account of the last moment of Archbishop Thomas Becket immediately before his murder in the Canterbury Cathedral
Richard the Lionheart	2013	1173	England	King Henry II decides to evaluate the courage of his son Richard the Lionheart, his possible successor.
Barbarossa	2009	1176	Northern Italy	Battle of Legnano
Arn – The Knight Templar	2007	1179–1187	Kingdom of Jerusalem	a Swedish knight is sent to Jerusalem as penance while his lover languishes in a convent
The Flowers of St. Francis	1950	1181–1226	Italy	Francis of Assisi
Francis of Assisi	1961	1181–1226	Italy	Francis of Assisi
Brother Sun, Sister Moon	1972	1181–1226	Italy	Francis of Assisi
Francesco	1989	1181–1226	Italy	Francis of Assisi
The Lion in Winter	1968	1183	Chinon, Angevin Empire (France)	Henry II is in power as his wife Eleanor of Aquitaine plots with their sons
The Lion in Winter	2003	1183	Chinon, Angevin Empire (France)	Henry II is in power as his wife Eleanor of Aquitaine plots with their sons
Kingdom of Heaven	2005	1183–1190	Kingdom of Jerusalem	events which led to the Third Crusade (the Battle of Hattin and the Siege of Jerusalem)
Soldier of God	2005	1187	Kingdom of Jerusalem	a Templar who has survived the Battle of Hattin
Saladin	1963	1187–1192	Levant	events leading up to and including the Third Crusade
Arn – The Kingdom at Road's End	2008	1187–1205	The Levant and Sweden	following the Battle of Hattin, the knight returns home to Sweden and participates in the civil wars
Richard the Lion-Hearted	1992	1189	Levant	based on Sir Walter Scott's The Talisman and set in the Third Crusade
The Crusades	1935	1190–1192	Levant	About the Third Crusade
Richard the Lion-Hearted	1923	1190	Levant	based on Sir Walter Scott's The Talisman and set in the Third Crusade
Robin Hood	1912	1190s	England	During the life of Richard the Lionheart
Robin Hood	1922	1190s	England	During the life of Richard the Lionheart
The Adventures of Robin Hood	1938	1190s	England	During the life of Richard the Lionheart after his release from captivity in 1194
The Story of Robin Hood	1952	1190s	England	During the life of Richard the Lionheart
The Arrows of Robin Hood	1975	1190s	England	During the life of Richard the Lionheart
Robin of Sherwood	1984	1190s	England	During the life of Richard the Lionheart
Robin Hood	1991	1190s	England	During the life of Richard the Lionheart
Robin Hood: Prince of Thieves	1991	1190s	England	During the life of Richard the Lionheart after his release from captivity in 1194
Robin Hood: Men in Tights	1993	1190s	England	During the life of Richard the Lionheart
Robin Hood - fourth arrow	1997	1190s	England	During the life of Richard the Lionheart
The New Adventures of Robin Hood	1997	1190s	England	During the life of Richard the Lionheart
Robin Hood	2006	1190s	England	During the life of Richard the Lionheart
King Richard and the Crusaders	1954	1191	Levant	While leading the Third Crusade, King Richard Lionheart battles treachery in his own camp as well as the Saracens and their charismatic leader Saladin.
Ivanhoe	1913	1192	England	adaptation of the novel by Sir Walter Scott about the English knight who returns from the Third Crusade to find that his name has been falsely slandered
Ivanhoe	1913	1192	England	adaptation of the novel by Sir Walter Scott about the English knight who returns from the Third Crusade to find that his name has been falsely slandered
Ivanhoe	1952	1192	England	adaptation of the novel by Sir Walter Scott about the English knight who returns from the Third Crusade to find that his name has been falsely slandered
Ivanhoe	1958	1192	England	adaptation of the novel by Sir Walter Scott about the English knight who returns from the Third Crusade to find that his name has been falsely slandered
The Revenge of Ivanhoe	1965	1192	England	adaptation of the novel by Sir Walter Scott about the English knight who returns from the Third Crusade to find that his name has been falsely slandered
Ivanhoe	1970	1192	England	adaptation of the novel by Sir Walter Scott about the English knight who returns from the Third Crusade to find that his name has been falsely slandered
Ivanhoe	1982	1192	England	adaptation of the novel by Sir Walter Scott about the English knight who returns from the Third Crusade to find that his name has been falsely slandered
The Ballad of the Valiant Knight Ivanhoe	1983	1192	England	adaptation of the novel by Sir Walter Scott about the English knight who returns from the Third Crusade to find that his name has been falsely slandered
Young Ivanhoe	1995	1192	England	adaptation of the novel by Sir Walter Scott about the English knight who returns from the Third Crusade to find that his name has been falsely slandered
Ivanhoe	1997	1192	England	adaptation of the novel by Sir Walter Scott about the English knight who returns from the Third Crusade to find that his name has been falsely slandered
Robin Hood	2010	1199	England	from the death of Richard the Lionheart until the early reign of King John
Robin and Marian	1976	1199–1201	England	from the death of Richard the Lionheart until the early reign of King John

=== Films set in the 13th century ===
Title	Release date	Time period	Setting	Notes
Valley of the Bees	1968	13th century	Kingdom of Bohemia	The film follows a young man who's sent to join Teutonic order by his father.
Diriliş: Ertuğrul	2014	early-to-late 13th century	Anatolia	13th century Turkish warrior Ertuğrul agrees to fight the enemies of Seljuk Sultan Ala ad-Din Kay Qubadh I in exchange for land when a good deed endangers his clan. It centres around the life of Ertuğrul, the father of Osman I, who was the founder of the Ottoman Empire
The Last King	2016	1204	Norway	Set during the civil war era in Norway during the 13th-century, centers on the efforts of the Birkebeiner loyalists to protect the infant, Haakon Haakonsson, the heir to the Norwegian throne after the death of his father, King Haakon Sverresson.
Gates to Paradise	1968	1212	France	the ill-fated Children's Crusade
Ironclad	2011	1215	England	the siege of Rochester Castle during the First Baron's War
Eye of the Eagle	1997	1218	Denmark	Adventure film about the prince of Denmark stopping a conspiracy to seize the crown
Ironclad: Battle for Blood	2014	1221	England	A survivor of the Great Siege of Rochester Castle fights to save his clan from Celtic raiders. A sequel to the 2011 film, Ironclad.
The Tartars	1962	1236–1242	Kievan Rus'	Mongol invasion of Russia
Prince Daniil Galitsky	1987	1238–1253	Kingdom of Galicia–Volhynia	King Daniel of Galicia, the first King of Rus'.
King Danylo – Kingdom Of Swords	2018	1238–1253	Kingdom of Galicia–Volhynia	King Daniel of Galicia, the first King of Rus'.
The Mongols	1961	1240-1241	Kingdom of Poland	Mongol invasion of Poland
Alexander Nevsky	1938	1241	North-eastern Europe	Prince Alexander Nevsky and the Battle of the Ice
The Adventures of Marco Polo	1938	1254–1325	China	the Italian explorer who traveled to the court of Kublai Khan
Marco Polo	1962	1254–1325	China	the Italian explorer who traveled to the court of Kublai Khan
Marco the Magnificent	1965	1254–1325	China	the Italian explorer who traveled to the court of Kublai Khan
Marco	1973	1254–1325	China	the Italian explorer who traveled to the court of Kublai Khan
Marco Polo	1975	1254–1325	China	the Italian explorer who traveled to the court of Kublai Khan
Marco Polo	1982	1254–1325	China	the Italian explorer who traveled to the court of Kublai Khan
Marco Polo	2007	1254–1325	China	the Italian explorer who traveled to the court of Kublai Khan
Marco Polo	2014–2016	1254–1325	China	the Italian explorer who traveled to the court of Kublai Khan
Northern Crusades	1972	1260–1273	Prussia	the Great Prussian Uprising against the Teutonic Knights during the Northern Crusades
King Mindaugas (Valdžia)	1992	1263	Lithuania	Two-part psychological costume drama about the life of Lithuanian king Mindaugas based on a play by Latvian playwright Mārtiņš Zīverts, aired by Lithuania's national broadcaster.
Knights of the Quest	2001	1271	Europe	French knights journey to Greece to retrieve the Shroud of Turin
Les Rois maudits	1972	1285–1328	France	the later Capetian dynasty and the arrest of the order of the Knights Templar and the seizure of their wealth by the French crown in 1307
Les Rois maudits	2005	1285–1328	France	the later Capetian dynasty and the arrest of the order of the Knights Templar and the seizure of their wealth by the French crown in 1307
Knightfall	2017–2019	1291–1307	France	recounts the success, fall, persecution, and suppression of the Knights Templar
Braveheart	1995	1296–1305	Kingdom of Scotland	William Wallace, a Scotsman who fought for Scotland's independence in the 1290s
The Virgin Spring	1960	late 13th century	Sweden	adaptation of the 13th century Swedish ballad, Töres döttrar i Wänge

=== Films set in the 14th century ===
Title	Release date	Time period	Setting	Notes
Kristin Lavransdatter	1995	early-to-mid-14th century	Norway	About a noblewoman with an arranged marriage who falls in love with someone else.
Kings of the Sun	1963	1300s	Mexico	On the coast of the Gulf of Mexico, the Native American tribe of chief Black Eagle clashes with the Mayan tribe of King Balam
Outlaw King	2018	1304–1307	Scotland	Robert the Bruce rebels against Edward I's rule over Scotland, thus becoming an "outlaw", depicts the Battle of Loudoun Hill
The Bruce	1996	1305–1314	Scotland	Robert the Bruce, who took over the rebellion against Edward "Longshanks" following the death of William Wallace in 1305
Robert the Bruce	2019	1306–1314	Scotland	The story follows Robert the Bruce during the First War of Scottish Independence
Tower of Lust	1955	1314	France	Margaret of Burgundy, Queen of France
Cathedral of the Sea	2018	1320–1370	Spain – Barcelona	The action takes place in 14th century Barcelona at the height of the city's trade and military power in the Mediterranean, during the construction of Santa Maria del Mar serving as background to the story.
Anchoress	1993	1329	England	Christina Carpenter, an anchoress from Shere, in southern England
Journey to Mecca	2009	1325	Middle-East	A dramatised documentary film charting the first real-life journey made by the Islamic scholar Ibn Battuta from his native Morocco to Mecca for the Hajj
The Name of the Rose	1986	1327	Italy	set in an Italian monastery
The Name of the Rose	2019	1327	Italy	Miniseries set in an Italian monastery. A dispute over the evangelical counsels of poverty between representatives of the Franciscan Order and the Avignon Papacy
World Without End	2012	1327–1361	England	A sequel to the 2010 miniseries The Pillars of the Earth, set in England at the outset of the Hundred Years War
Kazimierz Wielki	1976	1333–1370	Poland	Casimir III the Great of Poland
The Decameron	1971	1348	Italy	based on the novel Il Decameron by Giovanni Boccaccio.
Black Death	2010	1348	England	During the initial outbreak of the plague
The Seventh Seal	1957	1350	Sweden	During the initial outbreak of the plague. Although the actual outbreak started in 1347, it only reached Sweden in 1350.
Du Guesclin	1948	1354–1380	France	Bertrand du Guesclin, a Constable of France in the Hundred Years' War
A Knight's Tale	2001	1356	England	Loose adaptation of The Knight's Tale by Geoffrey Chaucer, this tale is partially inspired by the exploits of William Marshall, but set in the 1350s (with mention made of Edward the Black Prince and the Battle of Poitiers (1356))
Timeline	2003	1357	France	A group of archeologists travel back in time to medieval France to rescue their professor.
A Walk with Love and Death	1969	1358	France near Paris and Meaux	Anjelica Huston in the turmoil of the Jacquerie
The Dark Avenger	1955	1359	England	Edward, the Black Prince
Andrei Rublev	1966	1360–1430	Russia	about the life of Andrei Rublev, who was considered to be the greatest medieval Russian painter of icons and frescoes
John Wycliffe: The Morning Star	1984	1378–1384	England	the life and teachings of John Wycliffe, the 14th-century English theologian who is often seen as a fore-runner of the Protestant Reformation
The Reckoning	2003	1380	England	A priest on the lam takes up with a traveling band of actors, who then discover a murder has occurred and try to solve it by recreating the crime in a play.
The Last Duel	2021	1386	France	Based on the book The Last Duel: A True Story of Trial by Combat in Medieval France by Eric Jager.
Mircea	1989	1386–1418	Wallachia	Mircea the Elder, who repelled the Ottoman Empire during his reign
Boj na Kosovu	1989	1389	Serbia, Montenegro	a battle between Medieval Serbia and the Ottoman Empire
Banović Strahinja	1983	1389	Serbia	a battle between Medieval Serbia and the Ottoman Empire
Knights of the Teutonic Order	1960	1390s-1410	Poland	Set in the Polish–Lithuanian–Teutonic War
An Age of Kings	1960	1398–1485	England	TV series based on Shakespeare's plays depicting the lives of Richard II of England, Henry IV of England, Henry V of England, Henry VI of England, and Richard III of England
The Hollow Crown	2012–2016	1398–1485	England	series of films based on Shakespeare's plays depicting the lives of Richard II of England, Henry IV of England, Henry V of England, Henry VI of England, and Richard III of England
The Canterbury Tales	1972	late 14th century	England	Based on the medieval narrative poem The Canterbury Tales by Geoffrey Chaucer.

=== Films set in the 15th century ===
Title	Release date	Time period	Setting	Notes
Tirante el Blanco	2006	15th century	France and Constantinople	Adaptation of the 1490 romance, Tirant lo Blanc, about a French knight in the service of the Byzantine emperor in campaigns against the Ottoman Turks.
Chimes at Midnight (Falstaff)	1966	1400–1413	England	William Shakespeare's recurring character Sir John Falstaff and the father-son relationship he has with Prince Hal
John Hus	1977	1400–1415	Kingdom of Bohemia	Biography of church reformer Jan Hus.
12 Paces Without a Head	2009	1401	Baltic Sea	medieval German folk-hero Klaus Störtebeker, a pirate captain in the Baltic Sea who was said to have walked 12 paces after being decapitated by officials of the Hanseatic League
Margrete: Queen of the North	2021	1402	Scandinavia	The film is a fictionalised account of the Man from Graudenz, an impostor who in 1402 claimed to be the deceased King Olaf II/Olav IV of Denmark-Norway, son of the Margrete I of Denmark.
Jan Hus	2015	1402–1415	Kingdom of Bohemia	Biography of church reformer Jan Hus
Medieval	2022	1402–1419	Kingdom of Bohemia	fictionalised account of Czech military commander Jan Žižka prior to the Hussite Wars
The King	2019	1403–1420	England and northern France	Henry V of England, depicts the Siege of Harfleur and the Battle of Agincourt
Krzyzacy	1960	1406–1410	Central Europe	the Battle of Grunwald
Medici	2016–2019	1409–1492	Republic of Florence	The series follows the Medici family, bankers of the Pope, during Renaissance Florence.
Jan Hus	1954	1412–1415	Kingdom of Bohemia	Biography of church reformer Jan Hus.
Joan of Arc	1999	1412–1431	France	Miniseries about Joan of Arc from her birth in 1412 until her execution in 1431
Henry V	1944	1413–1422	England and northern France	Henry V of England's wars in France
Henry V	1989	1413–1422	England and northern France	Henry V of England's wars in France
Jan Žižka	1955	1419–1420	Kingdom of Bohemia	Biopic about Hussite reformer Jan Želivský.
Against All	1956	1420	Kingdom of Bohemia	Hussite reformation.
Joan of Arc	1948	1426–1431	France	Joan of Arc, the French heroine of the Hundred Years' War
Saint Joan	1957	1429–1456	France	The story of Joan of Arc, told from the perspective of Charles VII, from the time she first met him at court until 25 years after he executed her.
The Messenger: The Story of Joan of Arc	1999	1429–1431	France	Joan of Arc, the French heroine of the Hundred Years' War
Joan the Maiden, Part 1: The Battles, Part 2: The Prisons	1994	1429–1431	France	Joan of Arc, the French heroine of the Hundred Years' War, from her first encounter with Charles VII until her execution
The Silence of Joan	2011	1430–1431	France	Joan of Arc, the French heroine of the Hundred Years' War, from her capture in late 1430 until her execution in 1431
The Passion of Joan of Arc	1928	1431	England	The trial and execution of Joan of Arc
Vlad Tepes	1979	1439–1476	Wallachia	about prince Vlad the Impaler of Wallachia, who fought to repel the invading Muslim Ottoman Empire throughout his reign
Dracula Untold	2014	1439–1476	Wallachia	Origin story of Dracula, alter ego of prince Vlad the Impaler of Wallachia
Dark Prince: The True Story of Dracula	2000	1439–1476	Wallachia	about prince Vlad the Impaler of Wallachia, who fought to repel the invading Muslim Ottoman Empire throughout his reign
Rise of Empires: Ottoman	2020	1444–1453	Constantinople	the Fall of Constantinople to Mehmed the Conqueror, sultan of the Ottoman Empire, ending the Byzantine Empire
The Hour of the Pig	1993	1452	France	A public defender in a remote, rural province finds himself expected to defend a pig in a murder trial
Richard III	1912	1452–1485	England	Richard III of England
Richard III	1955	1452–1485	England	Richard III of England
Looking for Richard	1996	1452–1485	England	Documentary film about William Shakespeare's Richard III
The Life of Leonardo da Vinci	1971	1452–1519	Italy, France	The life of the Italian Renaissance genius Leonardo da Vinci (1452–1519).
Io, Leonardo	2019	1452–1519	Italy, France	A journey in Leonardo da Vinci's mind.
Leonardo	2021	1452–1519	Italy	Leonardo da Vinci accused of the murder of a fictional Caterina da Cremona.
The Conquest of Constantinople	1951	1453	Constantinople	the Fall of Constantinople to Mehmed the Conqueror, sultan of the Ottoman Empire, ending the Byzantine Empire
Fetih 1453	2012	1453	Constantinople	the Fall of Constantinople to Mehmed the Conqueror, sultan of the Ottoman Empire, ending the Byzantine Empire
The Black Arrow	1948	1455–1485	England	adaptation of the Robert Louis Stevenson novel about the Lancastrian hero in the Wars of the Roses
Black Arrow	1985	1455–1485	England	adaptation of the Robert Louis Stevenson novel about the Lancastrian hero in the Wars of the Roses
The Conclave	2006	1458	Papal States	Depicting a tense, politically charged Papal conclave
Isabel	2012–2014	1460–1504	Spain	Biography about the Queen of Castile, Isabella the Catholic.
Tower of London	1939	1462–1483	England	during the reign of Edward IV of England
The White Queen	2013	1464	England	the House of York and the House of Lancaster, are in violent conflict over the throne
Stephen the Great - Vaslui 1475	1975	1475	Moldavia	Battle of Vaslui
Leonardo	2011–2012	1475–1490	Italy	Set in 15th-century Florence, the show follows the adventures of a teenage Leonardo da Vinci
Da Vinci's Demons	2013–2015	1475–1490	Italy	Historical fantasy drama series that presents a fictional account of Leonardo da Vinci's early life
Maximilian and Marie De Bourgogne	2017	1477–1507	Austria	Maximilian I, Holy Roman Emperor and Mary of Burgundy
The Hunchback of Notre-Dame (many adaptations)	1905–	1482	France	Victor Hugo's novel, set in Paris.
Tower of London	1962	1483–1485	England	during the reign of Richard III of England
The Shadow of the Tower	1972	1485–1509	England	during the reign of Henry VII of England
The White Princess	2017	1485	England	Elizabeth of York's marriage to Henry VII, as well as his early reign
Princes in the Tower	2005	1490s	England	the trial of Perkin Warbeck, who claimed to be prince Richard, rightful heir to the throne before his untimely death in the Tower as a child
Christopher Columbus	1949	1492	New World	the discovery and conquest of the New World by Christopher Columbus
Christopher Columbus	1985	1492	New World	the discovery and conquest of the New World by Christopher Columbus
Christopher Columbus: The Discovery	1992	1492	New World	the discovery and conquest of the New World by Christopher Columbus
1492: Conquest of Paradise	1992	1492–1506	New World	the discovery and conquest of the New World by Christopher Columbus
The Borgias	1981	1492–1503	Italy	the family life and papacy of Rodrigo Borgia, widely considered to be the epitome of papal corruption of the era
Los Borgia	2006	1492–1503	Italy	the family life and papacy of Rodrigo Borgia, widely considered to be the epitome of papal corruption of the era
Borgia	2011	1492–1503	Italy	the family life and papacy of Rodrigo Borgia, widely considered to be the epitome of papal corruption of the era
The Borgias	2011	1492–1503	Italy	the family life and papacy of Rodrigo Borgia, widely considered to be the epitome of papal corruption of the era
Muhteşem Yüzyıl	2011–2014	1494–1566	Ottoman Empire	Based on the life of Ottoman Sultan Süleyman the Magnificent
Lucrèce Borgia	1953	1497–1501	Italy	Lucrezia Borgia from the annulment of her first marriage to Giovanni Sforza until her final marriage to Alfonso d'Este

== Renaissance era (1500–1700) ==
=== Films set in the 16th century ===
Title	Release date	Time period	Historical background
Viy	1967	16th century	Soviet horror film set in 16th-century Ukraine, based on the story of the same name by Nikolai Gogol.
Ever After	1998	early 1500s	A modern interpretation of the Cinderella story, involving several historical figures like Francis I, Henri the Dauphin, and Leonardo da Vinci
The Man Who Laughs	1966	1500–1502	Set during the war between the Borgia family and Astorre Manfredi, prince of Faenza.
Prince of Foxes	1949	1500–1507	About fictional Andrea Orsini, a captain in the service of Cesare Borgia.
The Black Duke	1963	1500–1510	The domain of Cesare Borgia is opposed by Caterina Sforza.
Conspiracy of the Borgias	1959	1500–1510	Cesare Borgia and Lucrezia Borgia chasing a conspiracy document.
Don Juan	1926	1500–1510	Fictional Don Juan famous as a lover and pursued by many women, including the powerful Lucrezia Borgia.
Lucrezia Borgia	1912	1500–1510	Silent film about Lucrezia Borgia.
Lucrezia Borgia	1922	1500–1510	Silent film about Lucrezia Borgia.
Lucrezia Borgia	1935	1500–1510	French film about Lucrezia Borgia.
Lucrezia Borgia	1947	1500–1510	Argentine film about Lucrezia Borgia.
Meriota the Dancer	1922	1500–1510	Love affair between Cesare Borgia and the dancer Meriota.
A Season of Giants	1990	1500–1550	Depicts real life events of Michelangelo.
Lucrezia Borgia	1940	1501	Lucrezia Borgia's marriage to Alfonso I d'Este
Bride of Vengeance	1949	1501	Lucrezia Borgia's brother Cesare Borgia has her second husband Prince Bisceglie killed in order to marry her to Alfonso I d'Este, Duke of Ferrara.
The Spanish Princess	2019	1501–1525	Catherine of Aragon
Apocalypto	2006	1502	Yucatán Peninsula, Mexico, the declining period of the Maya civilization.
La corona partida	2016	1504–1516	After the death of Queen Isabella I of Castile, both Ferdinand II of Aragon and Felipe el Hermoso fight to succeed her.
The Mandrake	1965	1504	Set in Florence in 1504, based on Niccolò Machiavelli's play.
Luther	2003	1505–1530	Martin Luther, from the time he became a friar until his trial before the Diet of Augsburg.
Luther	1974	1506–1526	Biographical play, presenting the life of Martin Luther.
The Agony and the Ecstasy	1965	1508–1512	The painting of the Sistine Chapel.
A Princess of Destiny	1929	1509–1547	Henry VIII
Henry VIII and His Six Wives	1972	1509–1547	Henry VIII
Henry the Ache	1934	1509–1547	Short film burlesque of the 1933 film The Private Life of Henry VIII
Condottieri	1937	1510–1520	Depicts the life of Giovanni delle Bande Nere, a famous 16th century Condottiero.
Sin	2019	1512-1517	The life of the famous sculptor and painter of the Renaissance, Michelangelo Buonarroti of Florence, set immediately after the death of Pope Julius II.
Judgement	1970	1514	Rebellion of György Dózsa, Hungary.
When Knighthood Was in Flower	1922	1514–1515	The story of Mary Tudor, and her marriages to Louis XII and Charles Brandon.
The Sword and the Rose	1953	1514–1515	The story of Mary Tudor, and her marriages to Louis XII and Charles Brandon.
Emperor	2018	1516–1558	In the 16th century, a young woman asked Emperor Charles V, Holy Roman Emperor to help her in her revenge.
Captain from Castile	1947	1518	A Castilian caballero, helps a runaway Aztec slave, Coatl, escape his cruel master.
The Road to El Dorado	2000	1519	Animated film about two con-artists who win a map to the legendary City of Gold, El Dorado.
Henry VIII	1911	1520–1530	British silent historical film based on William Shakespeare and John Fletcher's play Henry VIII
The Other Boleyn Girl	2003	1520–1536	Anne and Mary Boleyn
The Other Boleyn Girl	2008	1520–1536	Anne and Mary Boleyn
The Other Conquest	1998	1521	Mexico, depicting the secret adherence to traditional religious beliefs of the converted Aztec survivors.
Diane	1956	1523–1559	Based on the relationship between Diane de Poitiers and Henry II of France.
Diane de Poitiers	2022	1523–1559	The story of Diane de Poitiers and her destiny as the favorite of King Henry II of France.
Anna Boleyn	1920	1524–1536	Anne Boleyn, Queen Consort of King Henry VIII and the mother of Queen Elizabeth I.
Anne of the Thousand Days	1969	1524–1536	Anne Boleyn, Queen Consort of King Henry VIII and the mother of Queen Elizabeth I.
God's Outlaw	1986	1525	Depicts the historical figure of William Tyndale and his struggles with the authorities in the time of Henry VIII for translating the Bible into English.
The Headsman	2005	1525	An executioner in Tyrol (part of the Holy Roman Empire).
A Man for All Seasons	1966	1525–1535	Thomas More
A Man for All Seasons	1988	1525–1535	Thomas More
The Profession of Arms	2001	1526	Ludovico de' Medici and the War of the League of Cognac.
Nostradamus	1994	1529–1566	The life story of Nostradamus, from his years of the University of Montpellier to his death.
The Royal Hunt of the Sun	1969	1532	Francisco Pizarro's capture of Atahualpa, Sapa Inca.
Wara Wara	1930	1535	Romance set at the time of the Spanish conquest of Bolivia.
Carry On Henry	1971	1536–1540	Fictionalised story involving Henry VIII, ends with his marriage to Catherine Howard
The Private Life of Henry VIII	1933	1536–1543	Henry VIII, from immediately after the execution of Anne Boleyn until his marriage to Catherine Parr.
Young Bess	1953	1536–1558	From the death of Anne Boleyn to the coronation of Elizabeth I.
The Return of Martin Guerre	1982	1542–1560	Imposture of French peasant Martin Guerre in Artigat, France.
Jodhaa Akbar	2008	1542–1605	The love story of Mughal emperor Akbar the Great and Rajput princess "Jodhaa" i.e. Empress Mariam uz-Zamani.
Gunpowder, Treason & Plot	2004	1542–1605	The reigns of Mary, Queen of Scots and her son James VI and I.
Firebrand	2023	1544–1547	Catherine Parr, from her time as regent until the death of her husband Henry VIII.
Monarch	2000	1547	The final days of Henry VIII
Ivan the Terrible	1944, 1958	1547–1569	Two-part film about Ivan IV of Russia, beginning with his coronation as Tsar of Russia and ending with the death of Vladimir of Staritsa.
The Prince and the Pauper (many adaptations)	1909–	1547	Mark Twain's novel, featuring a fictional portrayal of Edward VI.
The Return of Martin Guerre	1982	1548–1588	The case of Martin Guerre in France – a true case of identity theft.
Stars of Eger	1968	1552	During the Ottoman–Hungarian wars, after the Ottomans have taken Buda, the Hungarian Capital (in 1541), the siege of Eger (1552).
Tudor Rose (Nine Days a Queen)	1936	1553	About Lady Jane Grey, Queen Regnant of the Kingdom of England for nine days.
Lady Jane	1986	1553	About Lady Jane Grey, Queen Regnant of the Kingdom of England for nine days.
Elizabeth	1998	1554–1563	The early reign of Elizabeth I.
Mughal-e-Azam	1960	1556–1605	The Story of Akbar the Great, Mughal emperor and his son Jahangir. Jahangir's relationship with slave girl Anarkali is featured.
Les Amours de la reine Élisabeth	1912	1558–1603	Love affair between Elizabeth I and the Earl of Essex.
The Virgin Queen	1923	1558–1603	The reign of Elizabeth I.
The Virgin Queen	1928	1558–1603	The reign of Elizabeth I.
The Virgin Queen	1955	1558–1603	It focuses on the relationship between Elizabeth I and Sir Walter Raleigh.
Elizabeth R	1971	1558–1603	The reign of Elizabeth I.
The Virgin Queen	2005	1558–1603	The reign of Elizabeth I.
Aguirre, the Wrath of God	1972	1560	Lope de Aguirre's ill-fated expedition down the Amazon in search of El Dorado.
Mary, Queen of Scots	1971	1560–1587	Mary, Queen of Scots
Queens: The Virgin and the Martyr	2017	1561	The rivalry between Mary, Queen of Scots and Elizabeth I
Mary of Scotland	1936	1561–1587	Mary, Queen of Scots
Das Herz der Königin	1940	1561–1587	Selective use of the life story of Mary, Queen of Scots, and her execution by Queen Elizabeth I for anti-English and pro-Scottish propaganda.
The crown is made of gold	1979	1561–1587	Mary, Queen of Scots
Mary Queen of Scots	2013	1561–1587	Mary, Queen of Scots
Mary, Queen of Scots	2018	1561–1587	Mary, Queen of Scots
Dangerous Beauty	1998	1562–1583	The film is about Veronica Franco, a courtesan in 16th-century Venice who becomes a hero to her city, but later becomes the target of an inquisition by the Church for witchcraft.
The Mill and the Cross	2011	1564	Life in Flanders under Spanish Habsburg rule as depicted in Pieter Bruegel the Elder's 1564 painting The Procession to Calvary.
Tsar	2009	1566–1569	Film about Ivan IV of Russia during the Oprichnina and the Livonian War
El Greco	2007	1567–1600	Greek biographical film about the life of the Greek painter of the Spanish Renaissance, Doménikos Theotokópoulos, known as El Greco.
Otello	1906	1570–1573	During the Ottoman–Venetian War (1570–1573) fought for the control of the Island of Cyprus
Othello	1922	1570–1573	During the Ottoman–Venetian War (1570–1573) fought for the control of the Island of Cyprus
Othello	1951	1570–1573	During the Ottoman–Venetian War (1570–1573) fought for the control of the Island of Cyprus
Othello	1955	1570–1573	During the Ottoman–Venetian War (1570–1573) fought for the control of the Island of Cyprus
Othello	1965	1570–1573	During the Ottoman–Venetian War (1570–1573) fought for the control of the Island of Cyprus
Otello	1979	1570–1573	During the Ottoman–Venetian War (1570–1573) fought for the control of the Island of Cyprus
Otello	1986	1570–1573	During the Ottoman–Venetian War (1570–1573) fought for the control of the Island of Cyprus
Othello	1995	1570–1573	During the Ottoman–Venetian War (1570–1573) fought for the control of the Island of Cyprus
Anonymous	2011	1570–1604	Life of Edward de Vere, 17th Earl of Oxford, an Elizabethan courtier, playwright, poet and patron of the arts, suggested as the actual author of William Shakespeare's plays.
Countess Dracula	1971	1570–1614	Based on the legends surrounding the "Blood Countess" Elizabeth Báthory.
Bathory	2008	1570–1614	Based on the story of Elizabeth Báthory, a Hungarian countess in the 16th and 17th centuries.
The Countess	2009	1570–1614	Based on the story of Elizabeth Báthory, a Hungarian countess in the 16th and 17th centuries.
La Reine Margot	1954	1572	France during the St. Bartholomew's Day massacre. The massacre was part of the French Wars of Religion.
La Reine Margot	1994	1572	France during the St. Bartholomew's Day massacre. The massacre was part of the French Wars of Religion.
The Princess of Montpensier	2010	1572	France during the St. Bartholomew's Day massacre. The massacre was part of the French Wars of Religion.
Beatrice Cenci	1909	1577–1599	About the life events of Beatrice Cenci.
Beatrice Cenci	1926	1577–1599	About the life events of Beatrice Cenci.
Beatrice Cenci	1941	1577–1599	About the life events of Beatrice Cenci.
Beatrice Cenci	1956	1577–1599	About the life events of Beatrice Cenci.
Beatrice Cenci	1969	1577–1599	It depicts real life events of Francesco and Beatrice Cenci.
Elizabeth I	2005	1578–1603	The last 25 years of the reign of Elizabeth I of England.
Ermak	1996	1580–1690	Yermak Timofeyevich and the Russian conquest of Siberia.
Elizabeth: The Golden Age	2007	1585–1590	The reign of Elizabeth I and the Spanish Armada.
The Testament of Aga Koppanyi	1967	1586	Hungarian adventure film based on the eponymous novel by István Fekete. It talks about the adventourous life of the Hungarian soldiers in the Ottoman Hungary, during the Ottoman–Hungarian wars.
The Execution of Mary Stuart	1895	1587	The execution of Mary, Queen of Scots.
Fire Over England	1937	1588	The Spanish Armada during the Anglo-Spanish War.
The Sea Hawk	1940	1588	The Spanish Armada during the Anglo-Spanish War.
Will (TV series)	2017	1589	The young upstart actor/playwright William Shakespeare, a Catholic from the small town of Stratford, arrives in wild and turbulent Elizabethan era' London during a time of religious turmoil looking for fame and fortune.
Goltzius and the Pelican Company	2012	1590	Dutch artist Hendrick Goltzius
Bill	2015	1593–1598	Set during Shakespeare's "lost years" —the crucial period, long a mystery to scholars, covering his rise from obscurity in Stratford-upon-Avon to fame as a playwright in Elizabethan era' London. When hopeless lute player Bill Shakespeare leaves his family and home to follow his dream. It's a tale of murderous kings, spies, lost loves, and a plot to blow up Queen Elizabeth I.
Shakespeare in Love	1998	1593	Fictional love affair involving playwright William Shakespeare and Viola de Lesseps while Shakespeare was writing Romeo and Juliet.
Mihai Viteazul	1970	1593–1601	Michael the Brave, prince of Wallachia, Moldavia and Transylvania.
The Merchant of Venice	2004	1596	Set in the Republic of Venice. The film focuses on the Venetian Ghetto.
Nova Zembla	2011	1596–1597	About the last journey of Willem Barentsz and Jacob van Heemskerk, when they and their crew attempted sail to the Indies via Northeast Passage over Russia. They were stranded on the island of Nova Zembla.
The Favourite of the Queen	1922	1596–1601	Queen Elizabeth I
The Private Lives of Elizabeth and Essex	1939	1596–1601	Queen Elizabeth I and Robert Devereux, 2nd Earl of Essex.
Elizabeth the Queen	1968	1596–1601	Queen Elizabeth I and Robert Devereux, 2nd Earl of Essex.
Galileo	1968	1597–1642	Depicts the life of Galileo Galilei and particularly his clash with the Catholic Church.

=== Films set in the 17th century ===
Title	Release date	Time period	Historical background
Shōgun	1980	1600–	Miniseries adaptation of the novel by James Clavell, which is loosely based on the adventures of English navigator William Adams, who journeyed to Japan in 1600 and rose to high rank in the service of the shōgun.
Mary & George	2024	1600–1628	British television miniseries based on Benjamin Woolley's non-fiction book The King's Assassin (2017) about the affair between James VI and I and George Villiers, 1st Duke of Buckingham.
Hamlet A.D.D.	2014	1602–future	Re-imagines Hamlet Shakespeare's play as a bizarre and comical tour through the ages. The story begins in 1602 and leaps chronologically through time to the present, then into the distant future.
Gunpowder	2017	1603–1605	English Catholic Robert Catesby and the Gunpowder Plot
Orlando	1992	1603–	Set in the Elizabethan era, loosely based on Virginia Woolf's novel Orlando: A Biography
Rembrandt	1936	1606–1669	Life of Dutch painter Rembrandt
Pocahontas	1995	1607	The colonization of Jamestown, Virginia
Captain John Smith and Pocahontas	1953	1607–1609	Relationship between Captain John Smith and Pocahontas in Jamestown, Virginia
The New World	2005	1607–1617	The colonization of Jamestown, Virginia
Galileo	1975	1609–1633	Biopic about the life of Galileo Galilei, focusing on his conflict with the Catholic church
1612	2007	1612	The Tsardom of Russia during the Time of Troubles
All Is True	2018	1613–1616	later years in the life of William Shakespeare
The Last Valley	1970	1618–1648	Set in the Kingdom of Germany, Holy Roman Empire during the Thirty Years' War.
Jamestown	2017–2019	1619–1622	The colonization of Jamestown, Virginia
Benedetta	2021	1619-1661	About the life of Italian nun Benedetta Carlini
Squanto: A Warrior's Tale	1994	1620	The life of Patuxet man Squanto and arrival of the Mayflower
Molière	1978	1622–1673	The French playwright Molière
Royal Affairs in Versailles	1954	1623	A historical film showing Palace of Versailles from its beginnings to the present day
Day of Wrath	1943	1624	Loosely based on the case of alleged witch Anne Pedersdotter, and using a fictitious witchcraft trial as a metaphor for the then-current Nazi persecution of Jews.
The Three Musketeers	Several adaptations (1903–2014)	1625–1673	Based on the novels (The Three Musketeers and its sequels) by Alexandre Dumas. The protagonists are loosely based on historical figures Charles de Batz-Castelmore d'Artagnan, Armand d'Athos, Isaac de Porthau, and Henri d'Aramitz.
Cardinal Richelieu	1935	1626–1642	The life of the great 17th-century French statesman Cardinal Richelieu and his dealings with Louis XIII
Silence	2016	1630s–1638	Jesuit priests from Portugal attempt to spread Catholic Christianity in Edo-era Japan
Queen Christina	1933	1632–1654	Christina, Queen of Sweden
Le Roi danse	2000	1632–1687	Jean-Baptiste Lully, an Italian immigrant to France and noted composer of Baroque music.
Black Robe	1991	1634	Jesuit missionary among the Hurons.
The Devils	1971	1634	The life and trial of Urbain Grandier, who was convicted of witchcraft and burned. He was blamed for the Loudun possessions.
The Devil's Whore	2008	1638–1660	The English Civil War and the reign of Oliver Cromwell
Witchfinder General	1968	1640s	Set during the English Civil War. A fictionalized depiction of Matthew Hopkins, a witch-hunter.
Admiral	2015	1640s–1650s	The life of Michiel de Ruyter and the Dutch civil war
A Field in England	2013	1640s	During the English Civil War
Barbara	1997	1640	Set in Faroe Islands. About a love triangle between the pastor for the parish of Vágar, his unfaithful wife, and her foppish lover.
Cromwell	1970	1640–1653	The English Civil War and the dissolution of the Rump Parliament
Cyrano	2021	1640–1655	The life of Cyrano de Bergerac in early 17th century Paris
Alatriste	2006	1643	Life of a Spanish soldier (Capitaine Alatriste) until the Battle of Rocroi. Based on the novel by Arturo Perez-Reverte
Molière	2007	1645	The French playwright Molière
The Libertine	2004	1647–1680	Life of the poet John Wilmot, 2nd Earl of Rochester
With Fire and Sword	1999	1648–1654	The Khmelnytsky uprising in Ukraine against the control of the Polish–Lithuanian Commonwealth. It led to the period of the Commonwealth known as the Deluge.
To Kill a King	2003	1648–1658	The reign of Oliver Cromwell, Lord Protector.
Charles II: The Power and The Passion	2003	1649–1685	The reign of Charles II of England
Restoration	1995	1649–1685	Set during the reign of Charles II of England
The First Churchills	1969	1650–1722	A BBC serial about the life of John Churchill, 1st Duke of Marlborough and his wife, Sarah Churchill, Duchess of Marlborough
The Deluge	1974	1655–1660	The Polish–Lithuanian Commonwealth during the Second Northern War
The Man in the Iron Mask	1977	1660–1667	Loosely based on the existence of the Man in the Iron Mask. Set in France in the reign of Louis XIV
The Man in the Iron Mask	1998	1662	Set in France in the reign of Louis XIV
The Great Fire	2014	1666	Set during the Great Fire of London in England in 1666
Versailles	2015–2018	1660s	Fictionalized drama about the reign of Louis XIV and the building of Versailles
Cutthroat Island	1995	1668	A female pirate and her companion race against their rivals to find a hidden island that contains a fabulous treasure.
Colonel Wolodyjowski	1968	1668	The Ottoman invasion of the Polish–Lithuanian Commonwealth, part of the Polish–Ottoman Wars.
Time of Violence	1988	1668	Bulgarian Christian region is selected by the Ottoman rulers to serve as an example of conversion to Islam
England, My England	1995	1670–1695	Depicts the life of the composer Henry Purcell
Vatel	2000	1671	France during the life of master chef François Vatel
The Prince of Homburg	1997	1675	Adaptation of the Heinrich von Kleist play fictionalizing the deeds of Frederick II, Landgrave of Hesse-Homburg in the Battle of Fehrbellin against Sweden. The Battle was part of the Scanian War.
Witchhammer	1970	1678–1696	Northern Moravia witch trials
The Red Violin	1998	1681	One section of the film is set in 1681 in Cremona
A Little Chaos	2014	1682	Louis XIV and the design and construction of the Gardens of Versailles
Peter the Great	1984	1682–1725	The reign of Peter I of Russia
The Day of the Siege: September Eleven 1683	2012	1683	Second Ottoman siege of Vienna.
The Cantor of St Thomas's	1984	1685–1750	German composer Johann Sebastian Bach
The Crucible	1957	1692–1693	Dramatization of the Salem witch trials that took place in Province of Massachusetts Bay
The Crucible	1996	1692–1693	Dramatization of the Salem witch trials that took place in Province of Massachusetts Bay
Salem	2014–2017	1692–1693	Loosely inspired by the real Salem witch trials in the 17th century
The Draughtsman's Contract	1982	1694	Set during the reign of William III and Mary II in England.
Robinson Crusoe	1997	1694–early 18th century	Robinson Crusoe flees Britain on a ship after killing his friend over love for the same woman. A fierce ocean storm wrecks his ship and leaves him stranded by himself on an uncharted island where he must fight for survival.
Tous les matins du monde	1991	late 17th century	French composer Monsieur de Sainte-Colombe.

== Films set in the industrial era (1700–1900) ==
=== Films set in the 18th century ===
Title	Release date	Time period	Historical background
Rákóczi hadnagya	1954	1708	Adventure movie in Hungary during Rákóczi's War of Independence (1703–11).
The Sovereign's Servant	2007	1709	The Battle of Poltava during the Great Northern War.
A Glass of Water	1960	1710	Set in London during the War of Spanish Succession
The Favourite	2018	1711	A frail Queen Anne occupies the throne and her close friend, Lady Sarah, governs the country in her stead. When a new servant, Abigail, arrives, her charm endears her to Sarah.
Rob Roy: The Highland Rogue	1953	1713	Scottish folk hero Robert Roy MacGregor
Rob Roy	1995	1713	Scottish folk hero Robert Roy MacGregor
Black Sails	2014–2017	1715–1726	Set roughly two decades before the events of Treasure Island and during the Golden Age of Piracy
Farinelli	1994	1715–1740	Depicts the life of Farinelli, one of the most famous castrati
Our Flag Means Death	2022–2023	1717	Television series depicting the relationship between pirates Stede Bonnet and Blackbeard (Edward Teach) during the Golden Age of Piracy
Blackbeard, the Pirate	1952	1718	British Navy Lieutenant Robert Maynard aboard pirate Blackbeard's ship.
Blackbeard	2006	1718	the infamous pirate Edward Teach
Maria Theresia	2017	1723–1741	Depicts the life of the young Maria Theresa
King of the Wind	1990	1727	Depicts the life of the Godolphin Arabian, an Arabian colt in 18th-century Kingdom of Great Britain during the reign of George II of Great Britain.
Of Love and Other Demons	2009	1730s	Depicts the daily life in the colonial port-city of Cartagena de Indias, at the Viceroyalty of New Granada at a time of extreme religious intolerance (thanks to the Holy Inquisition) and slavery.
The Great King	1942	1740–1786	It depicts the life of Frederick the Great
Maria Theresa	1951	1740–1780	Depicts the life of Maria Theresa
Joseph Andrews	1977	1742	An adaption of the novel Joseph Andrews by Henry Fielding.
Outlander (TV series)	2014–2026	1743–ongoing	Depicts events leading up to the Jacobite Rising of 1745
George Washington	1984	1743–1783	George Washington's life up to the American Revolutionary War
The Scarlet Empress	1934	1744–1762	Catherine II of Russia
The Rise of Catherine the Great	1934	1744–1762	Catherine II of Russia
Young Catherine	1991	1744	Catherine II of Russia
Catherine the Great	1995	1744–1762	Catherine II of Russia
Ekaterina	2014–2019	1744–1782	Catherine II of Russia
Catherine the Great	2015–2023	1744–1782	Catherine II of Russia
The Master of Ballantrae	1953	1745–1746	Jacobite Rising of 1745
Culloden	1964	1745–1746	Jacobite Rising of 1745
The Master of Ballantrae	1984	1745–1746	Jacobite Rising of 1745
The Great	2020–2023	1745	Loosely based on the rise to power of Catherine the Great, Empress of All Russia
Chasing the Deer	1994	1745–1746	Jacobite Rising of 1745
Mein Name ist Bach	2003	1747	Depicts Johann Sebastian Bach's visit to Frederick the Great in Potsdam, Prussia, when The Musical Offering was composed.
Horseman	2003	1747	Set in the borders between the regions of Bosnia and Dalmatia, the crossroads of the Ottoman Empire and the Republic of Venice. It deals with issues relating to the region's native Croats as they struggle to live between two empires and two faiths: Catholicism and Islam. Also covers the possibility of a love affair between a Christian soldier and a Muslim noblewoman.
The Amazing Grace	2006	1748	Tells the story of John Newton's transformation from slave trader to Anglican priest; story is set in Calabar, Nigeria.
Plunkett & Macleane	1999	1748	Loosely based on The Gentlemen Highwaymen William Plunkett and Captain James MacLaine. They were highwaymen noted for their restrained and courteous behavior towards their victims.
Treasure Island	1934	1750	Adaptation of the famous pirate story by Robert Louis Stevenson
Treasure Island	1950	1750	Adaptation of the famous pirate story by Robert Louis Stevenson
Treasure Island	1972	1750	Adaptation of the famous pirate story by Robert Louis Stevenson
Treasure Island	1990	1750	Adaptation of the famous pirate story by Robert Louis Stevenson
Casanova	2005	1753–1757	Giacomo Casanova
Lady Oscar	1979	1755–1789	The woman Oscar François de Jarjayes is raised as a man by her father, later gaining a career as a guard for Marie Antoinette.
A Tale of Two Cities	1911	1755–1792	England and France prior and during the French Revolution.
A Tale of Two Cities	1935	1755–1792	England and France prior and during the French Revolution.
A Tale of Two Cities	1958	1755–1792	England and France prior and during the French Revolution.
A Tale of Two Cities	1980	1755–1792	England and France prior and during the French Revolution.
A Tale of Two Cities	1980	1755–1792	England and France prior and during the French Revolution.
Amadeus	1984	1756–1791	Austria composer Wolfgang Amadeus Mozart
Fanfan la Tulipe	2003	1756–1763	The Seven Years' War, reign of Louis XV
Barry Lyndon	1975	1756–1789	The Seven Years' War, etc.
The Last of the Mohicans	1936	1757	French and Indian War
The Last of the Mohicans	1992	1757	French and Indian War
Northwest Passage	1940	1757	French and Indian War and the ranger campaign of Robert Rogers
Clive of India	1935	1757	Robert Clive, Commander-in-Chief, India and the Battle of Plassey. The Battle was part of the Carnatic Wars.
John Paul Jones	1959	1759–1792	Biographical adventure film about American Revolutionary War naval hero John Paul Jones.
The Mission	1986	1760–1763	Jesuit missionaries in South America
Belle	2013	1761–1804	The true history of Dido Elizabeth Belle, a mixed–race daughter of British Naval officer John Lindsay and an African woman. She was taken to England by her father to be raised by his uncle, William Murray, 1st Earl of Mansfield, as an aristocratic Lady, as befits her blood line. This forces Lord Mansfield, the Lord Chief Justice, to confront his own views on race, society and the antiquated laws of the time.
Mozart's Sister	2010	1763	The early life of Maria Anna Mozart, older sister of Wolfgang Amadeus Mozart.
Unconquered	1947	1763	Pontiac's War focusing on the Siege of Fort Pitt.
Brotherhood of the Wolf	2001	1764–1767	Based on a real-life series of killings that took place in France in the 18th century and on the famous legend of the Beast of Gévaudan
Catherine the Great	2019	1764–1796	Catherine II of Russia
Sons of Liberty	2015	1765–1776	A story about the Founding Fathers of the United States and the American Revolution.
A Royal Affair	2012	1766–1783	Set at the court of the mentally ill King Christian VII of Denmark, and focuses on the romance between his wife, Caroline Matilda of Great Britain, and the royal physician Johann Friedrich Struensee.
Napoléon	1955	1769–1821	French historical epic film that depicts major events in the life of Napoleon.
John Adams	2008	1770–1826	The story about the American Founding Father John Adams from the Boston Massacre in 1770 to his death in 1826.
Louis van Beethoven	2020	1770s–1827	Life of Ludwig van Beethoven, called Louis in family
The Duchess	2008	1774–1806	The life of Georgiana Cavendish, Duchess of Devonshire
Marie Antoinette	1938	1774–1792	Marie Antoinette, Queen consort of France
Marie Antoinette Queen of France	1956	1774–1792	Marie Antoinette, Queen consort of France
Marie Antoinette	2006	1774–1792	Marie Antoinette, Queen consort of France
Marie Antoinette	2022–2025	1774–1792	Marie Antoinette, Queen consort of France
Drums Along the Mohawk	1939	1776	Settlers during the American Revolution. They are raided by a combined force of British, Loyalist, and Indian raiders.
1776	1972	1776	A musical retelling of the American Revolution's political struggle in the Continental Congress to declare independence.
The Crossing	2000	1776	George Washington's crossing of the Delaware River and the Battle of Trenton
Revolution	1985	1776–1777	Fictionalized story of the American Revolution in New York
La Fayette	1961	1776–1781	The film depicts the life of Gilbert du Motier, Marquis de Lafayette, in particular his role in the American War of Independence.
The Patriot	2000	1776–1781	Based on the life of Francis Marion, an officer of the Continental Army officer during the American Revolutionary War.
Benedict Arnold: A Question of Honor	2003	1776–1782	Depicting Benedict Arnold, both an early hero of the American Revolution and a notorious defector.
Turn: Washington's Spies	2014–2017	1776–1814	American Revolutionary War
The Queen's Necklace	1946	1780s	Based on the Affair of the Diamond Necklace. Jeanne of Valois-Saint-Rémy, a descendant of the House of Valois and courtesan takes revenge by scamming Marie Antoinette, Cardinal de Rohan, and others. The scandal kindling the flames of the French Revolution.
Admiral Ushakov	1953	1780–1792	Portrays the career of Feodor Ushakov, a celebrated naval officer and contemporary of Horatio Nelson
The Affair of the Necklace	2001	1780s	Based on the Affair of the Diamond Necklace. Jeanne of Valois-Saint-Rémy, a descendant of the House of Valois and courtesan takes revenge by scamming Marie Antoinette, Cardinal de Rohan, and others. The scandal kindling the flames of the French Revolution.
Poldark	1975–1977	1781–1799	Adaptation of Winston Graham's novels set in Cornwall in the late 18th century
Poldark	2015–2019	1781–1801	Adaptation of Winston Graham's novels set in Cornwall in the late 18th century
Les Liaisons dangereuses	1959	1782	Adaptation of 1782 French novel Les Liaisons dangereuses by Pierre Choderlos de Laclos, originally set in pre-Revolution Paris. This adaptation is set in present-day France.
Dangerous Liaisons	1988	1782	Adaptation of 1782 French novel Les Liaisons dangereuses by Pierre Choderlos de Laclos, set in pre-Revolution Paris
Valmont	1989	1782	Adaptation of 1782 French novel Les Liaisons dangereuses by Pierre Choderlos de Laclos, set in pre-Revolution Paris
Dangerous Liaisons	2022	1782	Prequel of 1782 French novel Les Liaisons dangereuses by Pierre Choderlos de Laclos, set in pre-Revolution Paris
Ridicule	1996	1783–1794	On the brink of the French Revolution. A minor baron and engineer from Lyon tries to gain audience with King Louis XVI to fund drainage of the mosquito-infested swamps bringing sickness and death to his region.
The Liberator	2013	1783–1830	Life of Simon Bolivar
Jefferson in Paris	1995	1784–1788	A semi-fictional account of Thomas Jefferson's tenure as the Ambassador of the United States to France before his presidency and of his alleged relationships with British artist Maria Cosway and his slave, Sally Hemings.
Botany Bay	1953	1787	Fictional story about the First Fleet sailing to Botany Bay, New South Wales
The Madness of King George	1994	1788	The deteriorating mental health of George III, King of Great Britain and Ireland
George Washington II: The Forging of a Nation	1986	1788–1797	George Washington's life during his time as President of the United States.
Mutiny on the Bounty	1935	1789	the Mutiny on the Bounty
Mutiny on the Bounty	1962	1789	the Mutiny on the Bounty
The Bounty	1984	1789	The Mutiny on the Bounty
Farewell, My Queen	2012	1789	Marie Antoinette, Queen consort of France
La Révolution française	1989	1789–1794	French Revolution
The Scarlet Pimpernel	1934	1792	French Revolution
The Scarlet Pimpernel	1982	1792	French Revolution
Madame Sans-Gêne	1961	1792–1811	Historical comedy drama during the reign of Napoleon
Charlotte Corday	2008	1793	Trial and execution of Charlotte Corday after her murder of Jean-Paul Marat. Marat was a Jacobin journalist and politician.
Napoleon	2023	1793–1821	Historical epic film that depicts major events in the life of Napoleon.
Danton	1983	1794	Conflict between Georges Danton and Maximilien Robespierre during the French Revolution.
La Pola	2010–2011	1795–1822	Historical series which explored the life and the times of Policarpa Salavarrieta, also known as La Pola, Icon of Colombia, a Neogranadine seamstress who spied for the Revolutionary Forces during the Spanish Reconquista of the Viceroyalty of New Granada a woman who became one of the most important figures during the tumultuous years of the Colombian Declaration of Independence for preferring death instead of submission.
Napoléon	2002	1795–1821	Historical miniseries which explored the life of Napoleon Bonaparte
Beau Brummell	1954	1795	Beau Brummell, a 19th-century arbiter of fashion in England who popularized the man's suit and necktie
Kranthiveera Sangolli Rayanna	1967	1798–1831	Films are about Sangolli Rayanna, a prominent general from Karnataka, who fought against the East India Company until he was captured and executed in 1831.
Krantiveera Sangolli Rayanna	2012	1798–1831	Films are about Sangolli Rayanna, a prominent general from Karnataka, who fought against the East India Company until he was captured and executed in 1831.
Attack from the Sea	1953	1798–1811	Russian naval commander Fyodor Ushakov during the Mediterranean campaign
Northanger Abbey	1986	late 18th century (1798)	adaptation of Jane Austen's 1817 novel set during the time Miss Austen wrote the novel.
Sleepy Hollow	1999	1799	Set in 1799, when a Headless Horseman haunted a little town, Sleepy Hollow, New York.
The Remains of Nothing	2004	1799	Eleonora Fonseca Pimentel
Désirée	1954	1799–1815	The love story between Désirée Clary and Napoleon I
Napoléon	1927	1799–1815	Napoléon I of France

=== Films set in the 19th century ===
Title	Release date	Time period	Historical background
Pride and Prejudice	1940	early 19th century	adaptation of Jane Austen's 1813 novel set during the Regency era in Great Britain
Pride and Prejudice	1980	early 19th century	adaptation of Jane Austen's 1813 novel set during the Regency era in Great Britain
Pride and Prejudice	1995	early 19th century	adaptation of Jane Austen's 1813 novel set during the Regency era in Great Britain
Pride and Prejudice	2005	early 19th century	adaptation of Jane Austen's 1813 novel set during the Regency era in Great Britain
Mansfield Park	1983	early 19th century	adaptation of Jane Austen's 1814 novel set during the Regency era in Great Britain
Mansfield Park	1999	early 19th century	adaptation of Jane Austen's 1814 novel set during the Regency era in Great Britain
Mansfield Park	2007	early 19th century	adaptation of Jane Austen's 1814 novel set during the Regency era in Great Britain
Emma	1972	early 19th century	adaptation of Jane Austen's 1815 novel set during the Regency era in Great Britain
Emma	1996	early 19th century	adaptation of Jane Austen's 1815 novel set during the Regency era in Great Britain
Emma	1996	early 19th century	adaptation of Jane Austen's 1815 novel set during the Regency era in Great Britain
Emma	2009	early 19th century	adaptation of Jane Austen's 1815 novel set during the Regency era in Great Britain
Emma	2020	early 19th century	adaptation of Jane Austen's 1815 novel set during the Regency era in Great Britain
Persuasion	1971	early 19th century	adaptation of Jane Austen's 1817 novel set during the Regency era in Great Britain
Persuasion	1995	early 19th century	adaptation of Jane Austen's 1817 novel set during the Regency era in Great Britain
Persuasion	2007	early 19th century	adaptation of Jane Austen's 1817 novel set during the Regency era in Great Britain
Northanger Abbey	2007	early 19th century	adaptation of Jane Austen's 1817 novel set during the Regency era in Great Britain
Centennial	1979	19th century	miniseries based on the James A. Michener novel chronicling the history of the American frontier in a fictional town in Colorado
The Divine Lady	1929	1803–1815	Tells the story of the love affair between Horatio Nelson and Emma Hamilton
That Hamilton Woman	1941	1803–1815	Set during the Napoleonic Wars, the film tells the story of the rise and fall of Emma Hamilton, dance-hall girl and courtesan, who married Sir William Hamilton, British ambassador to the Kingdom of Naples.
Master and Commander: The Far Side of the World	2003	1803–1805	During the Napoleonic Wars
Vanity Fair	2004	1803–1814	The Napoleonic era
War and Peace	1956	1803–1815	The Russian Empire during the Napoleonic era
Eroica	2003	1804	first performance of Beethoven's third symphony
The Duellists	1977	1804–1814	The Napoleonic Wars
Tripoli	1950	1805	Battle of Derne
Austerlitz	1960	1805	Portrays Napoleon in this film about his victory at the Battle of Austerlitz
War & Peace	2016	1805–1812	The Russian Empire during the Napoleonic era
Conquest	1937	1806–1816	The love story between Marie Walewska and Napoleon I
Captain Horatio Hornblower R.N.	1951	1807	The Napoleonic Wars
The Pride and the Passion	1957	1807–1814	The Napoleonic Wars, the Peninsular War in Spain
Lady Caroline Lamb	1972	1810–1828	Lady Caroline Lamb, the British aristocrat, novelist and Lord Byron's lover
Mary Shelley	2017	1813–1821	Depicts the affair between poets Mary Shelley and Percy Shelley
Napoleon and Me	2006	1814	Principality of Elba during the Napoleonic Wars
Waterloo	1970	1815	Battle of Waterloo during the Napoleonic Wars.
Les Misérables	1934	1815–1832	France after Napoleon I (Bourbon Restoration and July Monarchy)
Les Misérables	1935	1815–1832	France after Napoleon I (Bourbon Restoration and July Monarchy)
Les Misérables	1995	1815–1832	France after Napoleon I (Bourbon Restoration and July Monarchy)
Les Misérables	1998	1815–1832	France after Napoleon I (Bourbon Restoration and July Monarchy)
Les Misérables	2012	1815–1832	France after Napoleon I (Bourbon Restoration and July Monarchy)
Les Misérables	2018	1815–1832	France after Napoleon I (Bourbon Restoration and July Monarchy)
The Count of Monte Cristo	1934	1815–1838	France after Napoleon I (Bourbon Restoration and July Monarchy)
The Count of Monte Cristo	1975	1815–1838	France after Napoleon I (Bourbon Restoration and July Monarchy)
The Count of Monte Cristo	2002	1815–1831	France after Napoleon I (Bourbon Restoration and July Monarchy); Unlike the first two films, this version states 1814 at the start. Dantes' plan happens over a three-year period, having been imprisoned for thirteen years, as is stated during the film. The ending is set shortly after Albert's sixteenth birthday, having been born in 1815.
Bright Star	2009	1818–1821	The last three years of poet John Keats's life
Pride and Prejudice and Zombies (film)	2016	1819	Film based on Seth Grahame-Smith's 2009 novel of the same name, which parodiesJane Austen's 1813 novel set during the Regency era in Great Britain
Peterloo	2018	1819	based on the Peterloo massacre of 1819
The Student of Prague	1913	1820	Gothic/historical fantasy set in Prague; a poor university student makes a Faustian bargain and loses his mirror reflection.
In the Heart of the Sea	2015	1820–1850	the story of the whaleship Essex which inspired the writing of Moby-Dick
The Greatest Showman	2017	1820–1860	Based on the story and life of P.T. Barnum, a famous showman and entertainer, and his creation of the Barnum & Bailey Circus
The White Slave	2016	1821	In the newly formed Great Colombia, a Spanish plantation burns down and only the baby of some planters is saved. She is sent to Kingdom of Spain, but as an adult, she hatches a plan to return home and become an abolitionist.
El Santo de la Espada	1970	1821–1822	José de San Martín and the Spanish American wars of independence
Bouboulina	1959	1821–1829	Laskarina Bouboulina, heroine of the Greek War of Independence
The Revenant	2015	1823	American frontiersman Hugh Glass fights for survival in the unincorporated Dakotas
Copying Beethoven	2006	1824	final years of Ludwig van Beethoven
The Deceivers	1988	1825	British officer in India investigates the Thugee cult
Mr. Turner	2014	1826–1851	Based on the last 25 years of the life of artist J. M. W. Turner (1775–1851)
The Flesh and the Fiends	1926	1827	Dramatization of the Burke and Hare murders
Immortal Beloved	1994	1827	aftermath of the death of Beethoven
The Enigma of Kaspar Hauser	1974	1828–1833	The story of foundling Kaspar Hauser in the German Confederation.
Bleak House	2005	1830s	Based on Charles Dickens' 1852–1853 novel
The Devil's Violinist	2013	1830s	Based on the life story of the 19th-century Italian violinist and composer Niccolò Paganini
A Song to Remember	1945	1830–1849	Based on the life story of the Polish pianist and composer Frédéric Chopin
La Note bleue	1991	1830–1849	Based on the life story of the Polish pianist and composer Frédéric Chopin
Impromptu	1991	1830–1849	Based on the life story of the Polish pianist and composer Frédéric Chopin
Chopin: Desire for Love	2002	1830–1849	Based on the life story of the Polish pianist and composer Frédéric Chopin
Disraeli	1916	1830–1880	It details the life and times of Benjamin Disraeli, who became Prime Minister of the United Kingdom
Disraeli	1921	1830–1880	It details the life and times of Benjamin Disraeli, who became Prime Minister of the United Kingdom
Disraeli	1929	1830–1880	It details the life and times of Benjamin Disraeli, who became Prime Minister of the United Kingdom
The Prime Minister	1941	1830–1880	It details the life and times of Benjamin Disraeli, who became Prime Minister of the United Kingdom
Disraeli	1978	1830–1880	It details the life and times of Benjamin Disraeli, who became Prime Minister of the United Kingdom
The Horseman on the Roof	1995	1832	Second cholera pandemic in July Monarchy France
Young Mr. Lincoln	1939	1832–1837	Early career of future president Abraham Lincoln
Miss Marx	2020	1833–1898	Story of the daughter of Karl Marx, Eleanor Marx
Martyrs of the Alamo	1915	1835–1836	Siege of Béxar, Battle of the Alamo, and Battle of San Jacinto during the Texas Revolution.
The Alamo	1960	1836	Battle of the Alamo during the Texas Revolution.
Victoria in Dover	1936	1836	Young Queen Victoria meets her future husband Prince Albert
Victoria in Dover	1954	1836	Young Queen Victoria meets her future husband Prince Albert
Victoria the Great	1937	1836–1861	Life of Queen Victoria
The Young Victoria	2009	1836–1840	Early reign of Queen Victoria of the United Kingdom of Great Britain and Ireland and her marriage to Albert, Prince Consort
Sixty Years a Queen	1913	1837–1901	Life of Queen Victoria
Victoria Regina	1961	1837–1897	Life of Queen Victoria
Victoria	2016–2019	1837–1850s	Life of Queen Victoria
Amistad	1997	1839–1841	Mutiny aboard La Amistad, a ship containing slaves from Africa. The ship had left Havana and was bound for Camagüey, both ports being in Spanish Cuba. The film follows the ship's entry into United States custody and the subsequent trial. The case was resolved by the trial United States v. The Amistad.
How the West Was Won	1962	1839–1889	United States expansion into and settlement of the West.
Belgravia	2020	1840	British society during the early Victorian era
The Emigrants	1971	1840s	The Swedish immigrants in Minnesota
Ammonite	2020	1840s	The romance between British paleontologist Mary Anning and Charlotte Murchison
Livingstone	1925	1840–1871	Depicts the life of the African missionary David Livingstone
David Livingstone	1936	1840–1871	Portrays the expedition of the British explorer David Livingstone to Africa
Song of Love	1947	1840–1856	The marriage of Robert and Clara Schumann and their close friendship with Johannes Brahms. All three were notable composers.
12 Years a Slave	2013	1841–1853	The story of free African American Solomon Northup after he was abducted and sold into slavery. Based on the autobiography of the same name
Edward the Seventh	1975	1841–1910	The life of Edward VII, King of the United Kingdom of Great Britain and Ireland.
Alias Grace	2017	1843	The story of Grace Marks, a maid who allegedly murder her employer and his wife in 1843
The Young Karl Marx	2017	1844–1848	Karl Marx
To Walk Invisible	2016	1845–1848	Based on the later lives of the Brontës as they wrote and published their written works.
Angelique's Isle	2018	1845	Based on the story of Angelique Mott, an Anishnaabe woman and her voyageur husband Charlie Mott who were stranded on Isle Royal in Lake Superior during the Ontario copper rush
Harriet	2019	1840s–1863	biographical film about Harriet Tubman
Gangs of New York	2002	1846–1863	New York City prior and during the American Civil War. The events occur in the crime- infested neighborhood of Five Points, Manhattan. The film opens in 1846 with a conflict between a Nativist gang and the Dead Rabbits. The action then moves forward to the 1860s with the Nativists still active and involved with William M. Tweed, "boss" of Tammany Hall. The action culminates in the New York City draft riots of 1863.
80 Hussars	1978	1848	Hungarian movie about the 1848–49 Revolution and War of Freedom in Hungary. Under the leadership of Farkas Paál a small Hussar troupe escapes from Poland to Hungary to join the Independence war against the Habsburgs. Their adventurous journey is full of thousands of dangers.
The Sea Has Risen	1953	1848–49	Epic Hungarian movie in Communist style about the 1848–49 Revolution and War of Freedom in Hungary, and about the great Hungarian poet Sándor Petőfi. Known with the title: Föltámadott a tenger
Men and Banners	1965	1848–49	Epic Hungarian movie about the 1848–49 Revolution and War of Freedom in Hungary. Known with the title A kőszívű ember fiai
Flowers of Reverie	1984	1849	Hungarian movie which talks about the time after the defeat of the Hungarian Revolution of 1848 and the Surrender at Világos
Dead or Alive	1980	1851	Hungarian movie which talks about the failed assassination by Gáspár Noszlopy on Franz Joseph I of Austria
The Sisters Brothers	2018	1851	Takes place during the California Gold Rush
The Empress	2022–2025	1853	Historical drama series on the life of Empress Elisabeth of Austria.
Eureka Stockade	1949	1854	Peter Lalor and the Eureka Rebellion, a gold miners' rebellion at the Eureka Stockade (Ballarat, Australia).
Mountains of the Moon	1990	1854–1864	Journey of Richard Francis Burton and John Hanning Speke in their expedition to Central Africa and the rivalry that followed
The Charge of the Light Brigade	1968	1854	The disaster of the Crimean War known as the Charge of the Light Brigade. It took place within the Battle of Balaclava.
Sissi	1955	1854	It is the first installment in the trilogy of films about Empress Elisabeth of Austria, nicknamed Sissi.
Sisi	2021–2023	1854–1860	TV series about Empress Elisabeth of Austria, nicknamed Sissi.
Sisi & I	2023	1854–1860	Fictionalised story of Empress Elisabeth of Austria from the point of view of her lady-in-waiting, Irma Sztáray.
Sissi – The Young Empress	1956	1855–1856	Sissi adapts to life as Empress of Austria.
Dickinson	2019	1856–1862	A TV series on the early life of American poet Emily Dickinson, taking place in part during the American Civil War
Sissi – Fateful Years of an Empress	1957	1857–1860	Last film in the Sissi trilogy.
Quanto è bello lu murire acciso	1976	1857	Failed rising organized by Carlo Pisacane in the Kingdom of the Two Sicilies
Garibaldi	1961	1860	Giuseppe Garibaldi leads a military campaign known as the Expedition of the Thousand in 1860
The Leopard	1963	1860	The Kingdom of the Two Sicilies during the Risorgimento
Sixty Glorious Years	1938	1861–1901	Life of Queen Victoria, sequel to the 1937 film Victoria the Great
Ride with the Devil	1999	1861–1864	depicts the activities of pro-Confederate Bushwhackers, guerrilla fighters, in Missouri during the American Civil War
Cold Mountain	2003	1861–1864	A couple in North Carolina is separated during the American Civil War and try to find each other again.
Gone with the Wind	1939	1861–1877	Georgia during the American Civil War and the Reconstruction Era.
Mrs Brown	1997	1861–1883	The relationship between Queen Victoria of the United Kingdom of Great Britain and Ireland and her personal servant John Brown.
Gods and Generals	2003	1861–1863	The American Civil War from the outset of the war to the Battle of Chancellorsville
Glory	1989	1862–1863	The American Civil War from the Battle of Antietam to the Second Battle of Fort Wagner
Copperhead	2013	1862	based on novel by Harold Frederic, set in upstate New York during the American Civil War
The Good, the Bad and the Ugly	1966	1862	Two bounty hunters in an uneasy alliance against a third attempt to find a stash of hidden Confederate gold in New Mexico in the middle of the chaos of the American Civil War
Gettysburg	1993	1863	The Battle of Gettysburg in the American Civil War
Lillie	1978	1863–1929	British television about Lillie Langtry
Wyatt Earp	1994	1863–1884	Events leading up to and following the Gunfight at the O.K. Corral
Dances with Wolves	1990	1863–1870	Fictional story set during the American Civil War and its aftermath in the American West, interaction with the Lakota Sioux
Ludwig	1973	1864–1886	Life and death of King Ludwig II of Bavaria.
Lincoln	2012	Early 1865	Events chronicling the last few months of the life of President of the United States Abraham Lincoln.
The Conspirator	2011	April 1865	Based on the events of the aftermath of the assassination of Abraham Lincoln.
Hell on Wheels	2011–2016	1865–1867	based on the construction of the Transcontinental Railroad.
Senso	1954	1866	An Italian countess as an affair with an Austrian soldier in Venice during the Third Italian War of Independence
Tommy's Honour	2016	1866–1876	The complex and bittersweet relationship between the pioneering and legendary Scottish golfing champions Old Tom Morris and Young Tom Morris.
Riel	1979	1869–1885	The activities of Louis Riel, a Métis in both the Red River Rebellion of Manitoba and the North-West Rebellion in the District of Saskatchewan.
The Lone Ranger	2013	1869	The Lone Ranger and his sidekick Tonto bring justice to the wild west.
Stanley and Livingstone	1939	1870–1871	Welsh reporter Sir Henry M. Stanley's quest to find Dr. David Livingstone
Lust for Life	1956	1870–1890	The life of the Dutch painter Vincent van Gogh
Vincent & Theo	1990	1870–1890	About the Dutch painter Vincent van Gogh and his brother Theo
News of the World	2020	1870	based on the 2016 American Western novel
Lonesome Dove	1989	1870s	the closing years of the Old West
Daniel Deronda	2002	1870s	based on George Eliot's 1876 novel
Citizen Kane	1941	1871–1940	Chronicles the life of fictional yellow journalist Charles Foster Kane.
Young Winston	1972	1874–1902	The biography Winston Churchill before he became Prime Minister of the United Kingdom during World War II.
Quigley Down Under	1990	1874	A Sharpshooter from Wyoming is hired by an Australian rancher paying a very high price. But when Quigley arrives Down Under, all is not as it seems.
Cannibal! The Musical	1993	1873–1883	Comedic musical retelling the story of cannibal Alferd Packer.
Centennial Summer	1946	1876	Set in Philadelphia at the time of the Centennial Exposition
Wild Bill	1995	1876	The last days of legendary lawman Wild Bill Hickok
The Last Samurai	2003	1876–1877	Events in the wake of the Meiji Restoration in the Empire of Japan, 1876–1877
Bury My Heart at Wounded Knee	2007	1876–1895	Events leading to the Wounded Knee massacre
Corsage	2022	1877	Empress Elisabeth of Austria nearing her 40th birthday
Ned Kelly	1970	1878–1880	British-Australian biographical film of 19th-century Australian bushranger Ned Kelly
Ned Kelly	2003	1878–1879	Biographical film of Ned Kelly based on the historical novel Our Sunshine
Warrior	2019–2023	1878	set during the Tong Wars in San Francisco
Zulu Dawn	1979	1879	The Battle of Isandlwana during the Anglo-Zulu War
Zulu	1964	1879	The Battle of Rorke's Drift during the Anglo-Zulu War
The English Game	2020	1879–1883	early association football in Great Britain
The Great McGonagall	1974	1880s	Humorous biopic of the Scottish poet William McGonagall
The Current War	2017	1880–1893	the 19th-century competition between Thomas Edison and George Westinghouse over which electric power delivery system would be used in the United States (often referred to as the "war of the currents").
Thousand Pieces of Gold	1991	1880s	Chinese immigrant woman in the American Old West.
Canadian Pacific	1949	1880s	Follows surveyors for the Canadian Pacific Railroad
The Miracle Worker	1962	1880–1887	The early childhood of Helen Keller, her infancy contraction of blindness and deafness and Anne Sullivan's arrival
Unforgiven	1992	1881	set in the American Old West
Tombstone	1993	1881–1884	Events leading up to and following the Gunfight at the O.K. Corral
The Assassination of Jesse James by the Coward Robert Ford	2007	1881–1892	The end of Jesse James' career as a criminal and the man who eventually kills him, Robert Ford in 1882
The Electrical Life of Louis Wain	2021	1881–1930	The life of English artist Louis Wain
The Gilded Age	2022–2025	1882	society in New York City during the Gilded Age
The Four Feathers	1939	1882–1888	During the British Army's Nile Expedition
The Four Feathers	2002	1882–1888	During the British Army's Nile Expedition
Wilde	1997	1882–1897	Oscar Wilde
Khartoum	1966	1884	Charles George Gordon defense of the Sudanese city of Khartoum from the forces of the army of Muhammad Ahmad during the Siege of Khartoum. Muhammad Ahmad had proclaimed himself to be the Mahdi.
Tesla	2020	1884–1900	Biographical drama film about Nikola Tesla
Houdini	2014	1884–1926	Miniseries about the life of the legendary illusionist and escape artist Harry Houdini from poverty to worldwide fame.
The Mudlark	1950	1885	A fictional account of how Queen Victoria was eventually brought out of her mourning for her dead husband, Prince Albert.
Arms and the Man	1958	1885	Takes place during the Serbo-Bulgarian War
Melba	1953	1886–1900	Musical biopic drama film of the life of Australian-born soprano Nellie Melba
Geronimo: An American Legend	1993	1886	Events leading up to the capture of Geronimo, a prominent Apache leader during the Apache Wars.
Freud	2020	1886	Depicts early career of Sigmund Freud, centred around a fictional criminal case in Vienna
Victoria & Abdul	2017	1887–1901	About the real-life relationship between Queen Victoria of the United Kingdom and her Indian Muslim servant Abdul Karim
From Hell	2001	1888	based on the graphic novel of the same name by Alan Moore and Eddie Campbell about the Jack the Ripper murders.
Mayerling	1968	1888–1889	Based on the Mayerling Incident, a series of events leading to the apparent murder–suicide of Crown Prince Rudolf of Austria and his lover Baroness Mary Vetsera.
At Eternity's Gate	2018	1888–1890	the final years of painter Vincent van Gogh's life
The Illusionist	2006	1889	tells the story of a magician in turn-of-the-century Vienna
Man of God	2021	1889	brings to life the incredible true story of Saint Nectarios of Aegina, Greece.
Ripper Street	2012–2016	1889- 1897	a British mystery drama television series set in Whitechapel in the East End of London. It begins in 1889, six months after the infamous Jack the Ripper murders.
Van Gogh	1991	1890	Set in 1890, the film follows the last 67 days of Vincent van Gogh's life
Woman Walks Ahead	2017	1890	the story of Catherine Weldon, a portrait painter who travels from New York to Dakota to paint a portrait of Sitting Bull
The English	2022	1890	an Englishwoman travels to the American West
The Prestige	2006	1890s	rival stage magicians in Victorian London
Colette	2018	1890s	Based upon the life of the French novelist Colette
Butch Cassidy and the Sundance Kid	1969	1890s–1908	Covers the activities of Butch Cassidy and Harry Longabaugh, prominent members of Butch Cassidy's Wild Bunch. The Wild Bunch was a loosely organized outlaw gang from Wyoming.
Loving Vincent	2017	1890–1891	The circumstances of Vincent van Gogh's death and aftermath
Heaven's Gate	1980	1892	Covers the Johnson County War
Hostiles	2017	1892	A U.S. Cavalry officer who must escort a Cheyenne war chief and his family back to their home in Montana
Lizzie	2018	1892	The Lizzie Border murders
Gandhi	1982	1893–1947	Biopic about the life and activism of Mahatma Gandhi
Mao Zedong	2013	1893–1949	Television series about Mao Zedong, from his childhood to the foundation of the People's Republic of China
Radioactive	2019	1893–1934	Biopic about the life and scientific discoveries of Marie Curie
An Officer and a Spy	2019	1894	Depicts the events of the Dreyfus Affair
The Last Czars	2019	1894–1918	Docudrama miniseries about the reign of Tsar Nicholas II from his coronation until his assassination
El Presidente	2012	1896–1964	Philippine Revolution and the final years and death of President Emilio Aguinaldo
Entente cordiale	1939	1898–1904	Depicts events between the Fashoda crisis in 1898 and the 1904 signing of the Entente Cordiale creating an alliance between Britain and France and ending their historic rivalry
Rough Riders	1997	1898	Depicts The Battle of San Juan Hill, part of the Spanish–American War
A merénylet (The assassination)	2018	1898	Depicts the tragic assassination of Empress Elisabeth of Austria
Heneral Luna	2015	1898–1899	The Second Phase of the Philippine Revolution and the heroism of General Antonio Luna
Trotsky	2017	1898–1918	Biographical television miniseries about Leon Trotsky
There Will Be Blood	2007	1898–1927	Epic drama set during the Southern California Oil Boom, loosely based on the book Oil!
Ohm Krüger	1941	1899	The film depicts the life of the South African politician Paul Kruger and his eventual defeat by the British during the Boer War
Gold	2013	1899	the Klondike Gold Rush in the Yukon Territory
Newsies	1992	1899	Based on the Newsboys' strike of 1899 in New York City

== Films set in the modern era (1900–1949) ==
Title	Release date	Time period	Historical background
The Knick	2014	1900	Doctors, Nurses, and others work at The Knickerbocker hospital
55 Days at Peking	1963	1900	Depicts the Battle of Peking during the Boxer Rebellion.
Breaker Morant	1980	1901	An Australian Lieutenant, Harry "Breaker" Morant, who ordered the summary execution of several prisoners during the Second Boer War
The Godfather Part II	1974	1901–1958	Second installment in The Godfather trilogy, the film serves as both a sequel and a prequel to The Godfather
The Battle of Port Arthur	1980	1904–1905	The film depicts the fiercest battles in Siege of Port Arthur during the Russo-Japanese War 1904 - 1905.
Nicholas and Alexandra	1971	1904–1918	Covers the last 14 years of the life and reign of Nicholas II of Russia, last Emperor of Russia. Includes the events of World War I, the Russian Revolution, the Russian Civil War and the shooting of the Romanov family.
A Dangerous Method	2011	1904–1912	Covers personal and professional relationships between Carl Jung, Sigmund Freud and Sabina Spielrein
Rosa Luxemburg	1986	1904–1919	Biography of Marxist and anti-war activist Rosa Luxemburg and her assassination in 1919.
Battleship Potemkin	1925	1905	The Russian battleship Potemkin uprising, part of the Revolution of 1905 in the Russian Empire.
The Real Glory	1939	1906	Moro Rebellion
The Passion of Marie	2012	1910	Biopic about Marie, the wife of Danish painter Peder Severin Krøyer
Tolkien	2019	1890s–1930s	Biopic about the life of J. R. R. Tolkien
Titanic	1943	1912	The Titanic disaster
Titanic	1953	1912	The Titanic disaster
A Night to Remember	1958	1912	The Titanic disaster
S.O.S. Titanic	1979	1912	The Titanic disaster
Titanic	1997	1912	The Titanic disaster
Titanic	2012	1912	The Titanic disaster
Downton Abbey	2010	1912-1925	British historical drama television series set in the early 20th century
War Horse	2011	1912–1918	journey of a horse raised by a British teenager during World War I
Reds	1981	1912–1920	Russian Revolution
Doctor Zhivago	1965	1912–1923	World War I, the Russian Revolution and the Russian Civil War
Iron Jawed Angels	2004	1913–1920	American women's suffrage movement during the 1910s
Gallipoli	1981	1914–1915	Gallipoli Campaign of World War I
Flyboys	2006	1914–1917	Focusing on the Lafayette Escadrille, a unit of American volunteer combat pilots in service for the Allies of World War I.
Admiral	2008	1914–1917, 1964	Covers the last three years of the naval career of Alexander Kolchak, a vice-admiral in the Imperial Russian Navy and leader of the anti-communist White Movement during the Russian Civil War. The film also depicts the love triangle between the Admiral, his wife, and the poet Anna Timiryova.
All Quiet on the Western Front	1930	1914–1918	Western Front of World War I
All Quiet on the Western Front	1979	1914–1918	Western Front of World War I
All Quiet on the Western Front	2022	1914–1918	Western Front of World War I
A Very Long Engagement	2004	1914–1920s	Western Front of World War I
Ararat	2002	1915	Based on the Defense of Van in 1915, an Armenian insurgence in the Ottoman Empire during the Armenian genocide.
La Masseria Delle Allodole	2007	1915	Set during World War I in the Ottoman Empire, depicting the Armenian genocide.
Sinking of the Lusitania: Terror at Sea	2007	1915	The sinking of the RMS Lusitania
The Promise	2017	1915	The Armenian genocide
Renoir	2012	1915–1919	Biopic about French artist Pierre-Auguste Renoir focusing on the last four years of his life
Shimon Haber	2008	1915–1919	Development and usage of Chemical weapons in World War I
Rebellion	2016	1916	Miniseries dramatization of the Easter Rebellion in Dublin
Lawrence of Arabia	1962	1916–1918	T. E. Lawrence and the Arab Revolt in the Ottoman Empire.
Michael Collins	1996	1916–1922	Later life of Irish resistance leader Michael Collins and his participation in the Irish War of Independence and the Irish Civil War.
1917	2019	1917	European theatre of World War I
The Lighthorsemen	1987	1917	Battle of Beersheba in the Middle Eastern theatre of World War I.
Stalin	1992	1917–1953	Brutal Career and Corruption of Soviet Leader Joseph Stalin
Erna i krig	2020	1918	A woman disguises herself as a man to join the army in order to protect her educationally subnormal son who has been called up to fight in World War I
The Wind Rises	2013	1918–1945	The life of Jiro Horikoshi
The Lost Battalion	1919	1918	Covers the fate of the Lost Battalion, units of the 77th Infantry Division. The units under the command of Major Charles White Whittlesey penetrated deep into the Forest of Argonne in France during World War I. They were trapped and surrounded by the German Army.
The Lost Battalion	2001	1918	Covers the fate of the Lost Battalion, units of the 77th Infantry Division. The units under the command of Major Charles White Whittlesey penetrated deep into the Forest of Argonne in France during World War I. They were trapped and surrounded by the German Army.
1918	1985	1918	Written by Horton Foote, depicts life in Texas and the devastating effect of the great flu epidemic of 1918.
La Vie en Rose	2007	1918–1963	Biopic of French singer Édith Piaf
Chariots of Fire	1981	1919–1924	British runners face prejudice and compete in the 1924 Summer Olympics. The runners are Eric Liddell and Harold Abrahams. Liddell was a Scottish man and Abrahams was a British Jew.
Killers of the Flower Moon	2023	1919–1926	the Osage Indian murders in Oklahoma
Al Capone	1959	1919–1929	Biopic of American gangster Al Capone from the beginning of his career in 1919 until his arrest in 1929
Rebel in the Rye	2017	1919–1951	Biopic of American author J.D. Salinger, from his childhood until the publication of his debut novel Catcher in the Rye in 1959
Evita	1996	1919–1952	Biopic of Eva Perón, First Lady of Argentina.
J. Edgar	2011	1919–1972	Life and career of J. Edgar Hoover, Director of the Federal Bureau of Investigation from 1935 to 1972.
The Wind that Shakes the Barley	2006	1920–1923	War film set during the Irish War of Independence and Irish Civil War
Anastasia	1956	1920s	Based upon theories on the survival of Grand Duchess Anastasia Nikolaevna of Russia and the activities of Anna Anderson. Anderson was the most famous of the Romanov impostors.
Vita & Virginia	2018	1920s	Depicts the relationship between Virginia Woolf and Vita Sackville-West
A Real Vermeer	2015	1920s	Biopic about Dutch art forger Han van Meegeren
Legionnaire	1998	1920–1926	Rif War
The First of the Few	1942	1922–1936	Aerospace engineer R.J. Mitchell designs the Spitfire despite his failing health.
Little Ashes	2008	1922–1938	Depicts the love affair between artist Salvador Dalí and poet Federico García Lorca
Frida	2002	1922–1953	A biography of artist Frida Kahlo
Rosewood	1997	1923	Depicts the Rosewood massacre
Bertie and Elizabeth	2002	1923–1952	Explores the relationship between King George VI and his wife Queen Elizabeth from their first meeting to the King's death in the winter of 1952.
The King's Speech	2010	1924–1939	The quest of George VI, King of the United Kingdom to overcome his stammer.
Togo	2019	1925	The story of Togo, a lead dog during the 1925 serum run to Nome
Inherit the Wind	1960	1925	Fictionalized account of the Scopes Trial in Tennessee
The Ogre	1996	1925–1945	The account of a simple Frenchman caught up in the events of World War II. He involuntarily serves in the French Army, spends time as a prisoner of war in East Prussia, and gets hired to take care of the animals in the local estate of Hermann Göring. When fired, the Frenchman finds a new job at nearby Kaltenborn Castle, a Nazi Germany military academy for boys. He gets tasked with recruiting children to serve the cause. Continuing service while Nazi Germany deteriorates and East Prussia faces a Soviet invasion.
Death Defying Acts	2007	1926	An episode in the life of Hungarian-American escapologist Harry Houdini at the height of his career in the 1920s.
Murderous Maids	2000	1926–1933	Set in Le Mans, France, tells the story of two French maids, Christine and Léa Papin who murdered their employer in 1933.
Hacksaw Ridge	2016	1926–1945	Early life and World War II experiences of Desmond Doss
Downton Abbey	2019	1927	film sequel to the television series of the same name
Ma Rainey's Black Bottom	2020	1927	A fictional story about real blues singer Ma Rainey, taking place during a single recording session.
The Aviator	2004	1927–1947	Biopic about Howard Hughes, an aviation pioneer, director, and successful film producer.
Changeling	2008	1928	Based on the Wineville Chicken Coop murders
Downton Abbey: A New Era	2022	1928	film sequel to the television series of the same name
Phar Lap	1983	1928–1932	Biography about the New Zealand-born Australian racehorse Phar Lap
The Imitation Game	2014	1928–1950	British cryptanalyst Alan Turing, who decrypted German intelligence messages for the British government during the Second World War
The St. Valentine’s Day Massacre	1967	1929	The events leading up to the Saint Valentine's Day Massacre
Lion of the Desert	1981	1929–1931	About the struggle of Libyan rebels under Omar Mukhtar against the Italian Royal Army in the years leading up to World War II.
Joe MacBeth	1955	1930s	Modern retelling of Shakespeare's Macbeth, set in a 1930s American criminal underworld.
Mildred Pierce	2011	1930s	based on the 1941 novel, set during the Great Depression
Richard III	1995	1930s	Adapts Richard III story and characters to a setting based on 1930s Britain, with Richard depicted as a fascist plotting to usurp the thron
Mank	2020	1930–1940	Biopic about screenwriter Herman J. Mankiewicz and the development of the screenplay for Citizen Kane
Henry & June	1990	1931	Biopic about two writers Henry Miller and Anaïs Nin
The Legend of Bagger Vance	2000	1931	Set in Savannah, Georgia, during the Great Depression; loosely based on the Bhagavad Gita. The story starts by setting a background. A noteworthy golf player went off to fight in World War I. He returned a decorated veteran but traumatized by the deaths of his unit in battle. He then sank into a life of habitual alcohol intoxication. In 1931, there is to be an exhibition match between famous golfers Bobby Jones and Walter Hagen. The veteran is asked to participate and compete against them. A mysterious man volunteers to be his caddie, helping the veteran to come to grips with his personal demons and play golf again.
Rabbit-Proof Fence	2002	1931	Australia's Stolen Generations
Hugo	2011	1931	A young boy discovers the history of early filmmaking
Road to Perdition	2002	winter 1931	A film set in Illinois during the Great Depression, and featuring Prohibition Era-organized crime figures. The protagonist is a mob enforcer for an Irish mob boss. The son of the boss wants to kill him, however, and manages to kill his wife and one of his sons. The protagonist and his remaining son escape to Chicago, attempting to find new work under Al Capone and his Chicago Outfit. Underboss Frank Nitti rejects the offers of the protagonist to join them. Nitti also contacts the Irish mob boss and they agree to have the protagonist killed. Starting an escalating conflict.
Perry Mason	2020	1931–1932	a fictional detective in Depression-era Los Angeles, based on the award-winning series of the same name broadcast from 1957 to 1966
Bonnie and Clyde	1967	1931–1934	About the exploits of Bonnie and Clyde, American outlaws and robbers during the Great Depression.
Christopher and His Kind	2011	1931–1952	Biopic about playwright and novelist Christopher Isherwood, focusing on his years in Berlin before the Second World War
Frances	1982	1931–1958	Life of actress Frances Farmer
Last Man Standing	1996	1932	During Prohibition in the United States, gun-wielding mercenary John Smith, arrives at the small town Jericho, Texas, close to the Mexico–United States border. He plays on both sides in a gang war between the Irish Mob and the American Mafia, while scheming to eliminate both gangs. The film is a loose remake of Yojimbo (1961), which was set in Japan during the Tokugawa shogunate. The original film was a loose adaptation of the novels Red Harvest (1929) and The Glass Key (1931) by Dashiell Hammett.
Gosford Park	2001	1932	murder mystery set at an English country house during the Interwar period
The Grand Budapest Hotel	2014	1932 (1968, 1985)	Two men team up to try and make a fortune
Public Enemies	2009	1933–1934	Set during the Great Depression, it chronicles the final years of the notorious bank robber John Dillinger.
Race	2016	1933–1936	The life of Jesse Owens who won four gold medals during Athletics.
The First Lady	2022	1933–2017	It portrays life and family events of three first ladies of the United States: Eleanor Roosevelt, Betty Ford, and Michelle Obama.
Murder on the Orient Express	2017	1934	murder mystery set aboard the Orient Express train traveling from Istanbul to London
The Highwaymen	2019	1934	Film about two Texas Rangers tasked with apprehending Bonnie and Clyde
The National Anthem	1999	1934–1935	Set in Shanghai during the Japanese occupation of Manchuria and the resulting conflict.
A Pearl in the Forest	2008	1934–1938	Set during the Great Purge initiated by Joseph Stalin in the Soviet Union. The film focuses on the spillover effects of the Purge on the Mongolian People's Republic, a satellite state of the Soviet Union.
The Gathering Storm	2002	1934–1939	Biopic about British prime minister Winston Churchill in the years leading up to the outbreak of World War 2
Cinderella Man	2005	1935	biographical sports film about American boxer James J. Braddock
Atonement	2007	1935–1940	A romantic suspense war film. Opening in the interwar period of the United Kingdom, during the late 1930s, and continuing to the early days of World War II. The film opens in 1935 with the interactions between the girls of the wealthy Tallis family and their cousin Lola on one side, and a lower class-man by the name of Robbie Turner on the other. When Lola gets raped, Robbie gets blamed for the act, arrested, and imprisoned. Four years later, Robbie is released on condition of serving in the British Army as part of the British Expeditionary Force on the areas of the French Third Republic.
Olga	2004	1935–1942	The relationship between German-Brazilian communist militant Olga Benário and Luís Carlos Prestes, one of the main leaders of the opposition against Brazilian dictatorship of Getúlio Vargas.
Elvis	2022	1935–1956	Biopic about the early life and career of Elvis Presley
Unbroken	2014	1936–1998	The life of Louis Zamperini.
The Hindenburg	1975	1937	The Hindenburg disaster at Naval Air Station Lakehurst, New Jersey.
O Brother, Where Art Thou?	2000	1937	set in 1937 rural Mississippi during the Great Depression. Its story is a modern satire loosely based on Homer's epic poem The Odyssey that incorporates mythology from the American South
Seabiscuit	2003	1937	Race horse Seabiscuit
John Rabe	2009	1937-1938	Businessman John Rabe helps save Chinese civilians from Japanese during Nanjing Massacre
I Saw the Light	2015	1937–1953	Biopic about country singer Hank Williams
The Good Shepherd	2006	1938–1961	Rise of Central Intelligence Agency's counterintelligence, leading up to the Bay of Pigs Invasion
Voyage of the Damned	1976	1939	Based on the events of the MS St. Louis
Hyde Park on Hudson	2012	1939	The 1939 visit of King George VI and Queen Elizabeth to Roosevelt's country estate.
The Dig	2021	1939	The 1939 excavation of Sutton Hoo
The Last Bastion	1984	1939–1945	Australia during World War II
Schindler's List	1993	1939–1945	German industrialist Oskar Schindler's efforts to keep Jewish people from being interred in Nazi concentration camps during World War II.
The Pianist	2002	1939–1945	World War II experiences of Polish-Jewish pianist/composer and Holocaust survivor Władysław Szpilman
Max Manus: Man of War	2008	1939–1945	Norway during World War II and Winter War
The Zookeeper's Wife	2017	1939–1945	the story of Antonina Żabińska and Jan Żabiński, who saved the lives of 300 Jews imprisoned in the Warsaw Ghetto following the German invasion of Poland during World War II
Get On Up	2014	1939–1993	Biopic of singer James Brown of his musical career
Battle of Britain	1969	1940	The Battle of Britain
April 9th	2015	1940	9 April, German invasion of Denmark. A group of Danish bicycle infantry is sent as a vanguard to slow down the German advance until reinforcements can arrive.
The Exception	2016	1940	Deposed Kaiser Wilhelm II living in exile in Nazi-occupied Netherlands.
Kongens nei (The King's Choice)	2016	1940	The film focuses on King Haakon VII and the Norwegian Royal family in the days before and immediately after the German invasion of Norway in April 1940.
Darkest Hour	2017	1940	May–June 1940. Winston Churchill's early days as Prime Minister, as Hitler closes in on Britain during World War II.
Dunkirk	2017	1940	The Dunkirk evacuation of World War II
Hurricane	2018	1940	The Battle of Britain
Malèna	2000	1940–1944	Italy during World War II
Un village français	2009	1940–2000	German military forces invade the fictional French village of Villeneuve, near the French-Swiss border.
Life Is Beautiful	1997	early 1940s	A Jewish-Italian man and his son during their internment in a Nazi concentration camp
Inglorious Basterds	2009	1941-June 1944	Jewish plans to assassinate Nazi leaders
The Way Back	2010	1941	Escape from a Siberian Gulag
The Good Traitor	2020	1941	Henrik Kauffmann and the signing of the Greenland treaty with the United States
The Ministry of Ungentlemanly Warfare	2024	1941	The British military recruits a small group of highly skilled soldiers to strike against German forces behind enemy lines during World War II.
Sink the Bismarck!	1960	May 1941	Depicts German battleship Bismarck and its last battle.
Defiance	2008	August 1941	Story of three Jewish brothers of the Bielski partisans who saved and recruited Jews during the Nazi occupation of Belarus.
Das Boot	1981	October 1941	Battle of the Atlantic
Tora! Tora! Tora!	1970	7 December 1941	The Japanese attack on Pearl Harbor
Pearl Harbor	2001	December 1941 – April 1942	The Japanese attack on Pearl Harbor and the subsequent American retaliation in the Doolittle Raid.
Empire of the Sun	1987	December 1941 – August 1945	The Japanese invasion of the Shanghai International Settlement and the Atomic bombings of Hiroshima and Nagasaki.
The Gallant Hours	1960	1942	U.S. Navy admiral William Halsey in the crucial early weeks of his command of American forces in the Guadalcanal campaign of World War II.
U-571	2000	1942	Battle of the Atlantic
The Boy in the Striped Pyjamas	2008	1942	Set during the Holocaust
Allied	2016	1942	A Canadian intelligence officer and a French Resistance fighter pose as a married couple during a mission in Casablanca
Das Boot	2018	1942	Battle of the Atlantic, sequel to Das Boot (1981)
Greyhound	2020	1942	Battle of the Atlantic
Midway	1976	June 1942	The Battle of Midway
Midway	2019	June 1942	The Battle of Midway
Kokoda	2006	August 1942	Australia's 39th Battalion during the early days of the Kokoda Track campaign
The Bridge on the River Kwai	1957	1942–1943	Construction of the Burma Railway by forced labour, mainly British prisoners of war, during the Burma Campaign of World War II.
Stalingrad	1993	August 1942 – February 1943	The Battle of Stalingrad from a German perspective.
The Thin Red Line	1998	August 1942 – February 1943	The Guadalcanal campaign
Band of Brothers	2001	August 1942 – May 1945	Miniseries portraying the soldiers in Easy Company of the 506th Parachute Infantry Regiment of the 101st Airborne Division, from training in boot camp to action in the European Theatre of World War II.
The Pacific	2010	August 1942 – August 1945	Miniseries portraying the Pacific Theater of World War II
Stalingrad (2013 film)	2013	November 1942	Love story set in Battle of Stalingrad
Enemy at the Gates	2001	winter 1942–1943	The activities of Soviet sniper Vasily Zaytsev in the Battle of Stalingrad
Patton	1970	1943–1945	The exploits of United States Army General George S. Patton during World War II
Sophie Scholl – The Final Days	2005	February 1943	The ultimate days of Sophie Scholl, a White Rose revolutionary. She actively opposing Nazi Germany until her execution and death.
Cross of Iron	1977	spring 1943	Eastern Front
Hvidsten Gruppen (This Life)	2012	1943	The story about the Danish resistance movement Hvidsten Gruppen.
The Dam Busters	1955	May 1943	Development of the Upkeep bouncing bomb and its use in Operation Chastise
Memphis Belle	1990	May 1943	About the 25th and last mission of the Memphis Belle, an American Boeing B-17 Flying Fortress bomber flying over Nazi Germany as part Strategic bombing operations.
Masters of the Air	2024	spring 1943–1945	Miniseries portraying the story of the 100th Bomb Group during World War II and follows bomber crews on dangerous missions to destroy targets inside German-occupied Europe
Eye of the Needle	1981	1944	a German spy in England who discovers vital information about the upcoming D-Day invasion
Black Book	2006	1944	a Dutch-Jewish singer becomes a spy for the resistance in German-occupied Netherlands
Flame & Citron	2008	1944	The story of two Danish resistance movement fighters nicknamed Flame and Citron, during the Nazi occupation of Denmark
Red Tails	2012	1944	Tuskegee Airmen during World War II
The Longest Day	1962	6 June 1944	The Normandy landings, the first stage of the Invasion of Normandy
Saving Private Ryan	1998	June 1944	The Normandy landings and their aftermath
Windtalkers	2002	June–July 1944	Focuses on Navajo code talkers during the Battle of Saipan
Valkyrie	2008	July 1944	Set in Nazi Germany during World War II. It depicts the 20 July plot in 1944 by German army officers to assassinate Adolf Hitler and to use the Operation Valkyrie national emergency plan to take control of the country.
A Bridge Too Far	1977	September 1944	Operation Market Garden
Kanal	1956	September 1944	Warsaw Uprising
When Trumpets Fade	1998	September 1944	The Battle of Hürtgen Forest
Saints and Soldiers	2003	December 1944 – January 1945	The Malmedy massacre and its aftermath during the Battle of the Bulge.
Battle of the Bulge	1965	December 1944 – January 1945	The Battle of the Bulge. Based on the last major German offensive campaign on the Western Front during World War II. It was launched through the densely forested Ardennes region of Wallonia in eastern Belgium, northeast France, and Luxembourg, towards the end of the war in Europe.
The Great Raid	2005	January 1945	Liberation of the Cabanatuan Prison Camp on the island of Luzon, Philippines. The camp was set up during the Japanese occupation of the Philippines.
Flags of Our Fathers	2006	February–March 1945	the Battle of Iwo Jima from an American perspective.
Letters from Iwo Jima	2006	February–March 1945	The Battle of Iwo Jima from a Japanese perspective.
The Shadow In My Eye	2021	21 March 1945	Operation Carthage
Grave of the Fireflies	1988	March–September 1945	Japanese sibling struggle to survive toward the end of World War II during the firebombing of Kobe and its aftermath.
Fury	2014	April 1945	2nd Armored Division Tank crewmen during the Western Allied invasion of Germany
The Captain	2017	April 1945	German war Criminal Willi Herold assumes command after finding a Nazi uniform.
Downfall	2004	April–May 1945	Depicting the final ten days of Adolf Hitler's reign over Nazi Germany and their immediate aftermath. Events take place during the Battle of Berlin.
Ashes and Diamonds	1958	May 1945	Polish Home Army soldiers assigned to assassinate a Communist commissar
A Royal Night Out	2015	May 1945	The teenaged Princess Elizabeth, with younger sister Princess Margaret, ventures out of Buckingham Palace to enjoy the VE Day celebrations.
USS Indianapolis: Men of Courage	2016	July 1945	The sinking of the USS Indianapolis.
The Good German	2006	July–August 1945	During the Potsdam Conference
Nuremberg	2000	November 1945 – October 1946	The first of the Nuremberg trials
42	2013	1945–47	Jackie Robinson biopic of MLB playing career
The Godfather	1972	1945–1955	Vito Corleone, the aging patriarch of an organized crime dynasty, transfers control of his clandestine empire to his reluctant son Michael Corleone. The film is set primarily in New York City, and is based on the novel The Godfather by Mario Puzo. The novel and film fictionalize actual people and events connected to the Five Families. Vito Corleone himself was a composite of real-life organized crime bosses Frank Costello and Carlo Gambino.
Judgment at Nuremberg	1961	1947	The Judges' Trial
Who Framed Roger Rabbit	1988	1947	A toon-hating detective is a cartoon rabbit's only hope to prove his innocence when he is accused of murder.
The Black Dahlia	2006	1947	The murder of Elizabeth Short and subsequent investigation.
Exodus	1960	1947–1948	Foundation of Israel
Cast a Giant Shadow	1966	1948	United States Army colonel Mickey Marcus's involvement in the 1948 Arab–Israeli War
Roa	2013	1948	The final days in the life of Juan Roa Sierra, the man who was blamed for the 1948 assassination of Jorge Eliécer Gaitán, the charismatic liberal candidate for president of the Republic of Colombia his murder provoked the Bogotazo rioting and the imminent beginning of the bloody La Violencia
The Pact	2021	1948	The intense friendship between Karen Blixen, the Danish author best known for her autobiographical novel Out of Africa, and Thorkild Bjørnvig, a young and promising poet.

== Films set in the atomic era (1950–1999) ==
Title	Release date	Time period	Historical background
Mandela: Long Walk to Freedom	2013	1925–1995	Nelson Mandela
Walk the Line	2005	1944–1968	Johnny Cash
The Notorious Bettie Page	2005	1949–1959	Bettie Page
The Right Stuff	1983	1947–1963	History of the space race
The Shawshank Redemption	1994	1947–1987	takes place in a state penitentiary set in mid-century New England
A Beautiful Mind	2001	1947–1994	based on the life of John Nash, a Nobel Laureate in Economics
The Crown	2016	1947–2005	Follows the political rivalries and romance of Queen Elizabeth II's reign and the events that shaped the second half of the 20th century.
American Hot Wax	1978	1950	Disc jockey Alan Freed's involvement in the emergence of rock and roll
Snow Falling on Cedars	1999	1950	A Japanese-American fisherman is accused of killing his neighbor at sea. In the 1950s, race figures into the trial. So does reporter Ishmael.
Sayonara	1957	1950–1953	the story of an American Air Force pilot during the Korean War who falls in love with a famous Japanese dancer
A Funny Man	2011	1950s–1980	Dirch Passer
Rocketman	2019	1950s–1982	Elton John
Hail, Caesar!	2016	1951	A Hollywood fixer in the 1950s works to keep the studio's stars in line
The Queen's Sister	2005	1952–1975	A semi-fictionalized account of the life of Princess Margaret, the younger sister of Queen Elizabeth II, from 1952 until the mid-1970s
The Finest Hours	2016	1952	The SS Pendleton Coast Guard rescue mission attempt
The Motorcycle Diaries	2004	1952–1967	The life of Che Guevara
The Kennedys	2011	1952–1968	The triumphs and tragedies of the Kennedy family
L.A. Confidential (film)	1997	1953	LAPD officers in 1953, and the intersection of police corruption and Hollywood celebrity
Good Night, and Good Luck	2005	1953	The conflict between veteran radio and television journalist Edward R. Murrow and U.S. Senator Joseph McCarthy relating to the anti-Communist Senator's actions with the Senate Permanent Subcommittee on Investigations
The Front Line	2011	1953	A drama centered on the Korean War's final battle which will determine the border between North Korea and South Korea
The Death of Stalin	2017	1953	The events that transpired after the death of Joseph Stalin in 1953
Being the Ricardos	2021	1953	Lucille Ball and Desi Arnaz deal with accusations that Lucille is a communist in Cold War America while preparing to film an episode of I Love Lucy
Elvis	1979	1953–1972	The story follows the life and career of rock and roll icon Elvis Presley
The People vs. Larry Flynt	1996	1953–1988	Biopic about Larry Flynt, publisher of Hustler magazine
The Quiet American	2002	1954	The film covers early American covert involvement in Vietnam during the last days of the First Indochina War. It set the stage for the subsequent Vietnam War.
The Founder	2016	1954	The story of Ray Kroc, a salesman who turned the innovative fast food eatery of Richard and Maurice McDonald, McDonald's, into one of the biggest restaurant businesses in the world. Th film depicts Kroc using a combination of ambition, persistence, and ruthlessness.
The Battle of Algiers	1966	1954–1960	During the Algerian War
Forrest Gump	1994	1954–1981	The remarkable life story of a kind and brave Alabama man with an IQ of 75.
Lumumba	2000	1955–1961	Path of the first Prime Minister of the Republic of the Congo Patrice Lumumba and his killing. The Republic itself was the former Belgian Congo following its independence.
Che	2008	1955–1967	The life and death of Che Guevara
Goodfellas	1990	1955–1980	Biopic about mobster Henry Hill. Hill was an associate of the Lucchese crime family, who later became an informant of the Federal Bureau of Investigation.
Blow	2001	1955–1994	Biopic about drug trafficker George Jung
The Club	2021	1950–1955	Multiple depictions that show an anti-Greek sentiment in Turkey, Varlık Vergisi and in the last episode the Istanbul pogrom is depicted.
Pains of Autumn	2009	September 1955	Istanbul pogrom against Greek minority.
Nasser 56	1996	1956	The Suez Crisis from the Egyptian point of view
Children of Glory	2006	1956	Hungarian Revolution of 1956
Great Balls of Fire!	1989	1956–1958	The early career of Rock and roll pioneer Jerry Lee Lewis
Quiz Show	1994	1956–1958	Twenty-One Quiz show scandals
My Week with Marilyn	2011	1956	The film focuses on the week during the shooting of the 1957 film The Prince and the Showgirl. Marilyn Monroe was escorted around London by Colin Clark, after her husband Arthur Miller had returned to the United States.
Ferrari	2023	1957	Enzo Ferrari gambles his failing empire and fractured personal life on the perilous Mille Miglia open-road race.
Bridge of Spies	2015	1957–1961	During the Cold War, an American lawyer is recruited to defend an arrested Soviet spy in court, and then help the CIA facilitate an exchange of the spy for the Soviet-captured American U2 spy plane pilot, Francis Gary Powers.
The Butler	2013	1957–1986	Based on the life of White House butler Eugene Allen
Loving	2016	1958–1967	Based on the lives of Mildred and Richard Loving and the events surrounding the landmark court case of Loving v. Virginia.
In Cold Blood	1967	1959	Based on Truman Capote's nonfiction book of the same name about the murdered Clutter family in Holcomb, Kansas.
Black and White	2002	1959	Biographical film about the Max Stuart case where an Indigenous Australia man was found guilty of murder and the legal fight to have his death sentence commuted.
Hollywoodland	2006	1959	a private detective investigates the circumstances surrounding the death of actor George Reeves
Scandal	1989	1959–1963	Christine Keeler, Stephen Ward and the Profumo affair
Respect	2021	1959–1972	Follows the career of African American singer Aretha Franklin
Heaven & Earth	1993	1960–1980	Vietnam War
The Courier	2020	1960–1966	Greville Wynne
The Odd Angry Shot	1979	1960s	Experiences of Australian soldiers during the Vietnam War.
Ruby Bridges	1998	1960	A young black girl attends a white only school.
The German Doctor	2013	1960	The life of Josef Mengele in Argentina. He was a former Nazi wanted for War crimes. He was a target for Nazi hunters.
Gagarin: First in Space	2013	1960–1961	The Vostok 1 mission, making the Soviet cosmonaut Yuri Gagarin the first human to cross into outer space. It was the first human spaceflight.
City of God	2002	1960–1980	The growth of organized crime in Cidade de Deus, Rio de Janeiro.
From the Earth to the Moon	1998	1961–1972	The series captures the entire Apollo era, beginning with the American response to early Soviet successes and culminating in the final lunar mission, Apollo 17.
Selena	1997	1961; 1981–1995	Biographic of Selena Quintanilla-Pérez.
The Eichmann Show	2015	1961	The behind the scenes of the television broadcast of the Eichmann Trial
Experimenter	2015	1961	Milgram experiment
The Siege of Jadotville	2016	1961	Irish forces battle French and Belgian forces in the Congo
Hidden Figures	2016	1961	The black female mathematicians who worked at the National Aeronautics and Space Administration (NASA) during the Space Race
K-19: The Widowmaker	2002	1961, 1989	Soviet submarine K-19 nuclear disaster
Saving Mr. Banks	2013	1961–1964	Events surrounding the development of the film Mary Poppins
JFK	1991	1961–1966	The assassination of President of the United States John F. Kennedy and subsequent investigation
First Man	2018	1961–1969	About the life of Neil Armstrong and the decade leading up to the Apollo 11 lunar mission
Thirteen Days	2000	1962	The Cuban Missile Crisis
Green Book	2018	1962	a tour of the Deep South by African American classical and jazz pianist Don Shirley and Italian American bouncer Frank "Tony Lip" Vallelonga who served as Shirley's driver and bodyguard
Dear Comrades!	2020	1962	Novocherkassk massacre
Z	1969	1963	The assassination of Grigoris Lambrakis
A Perfect World	1993	1963	A kidnapped boy strikes up a friendship with his captor: an escaped convict on the run from the law, while the search is headed up by an honorable Texas Ranger.
The Help	2011	1963	Race relations in the Deep South during the Civil Rights Movement
Parkland	2013	1963	Immediate aftermath of the JFK assassination
Jackie	2016	1963	Jacqueline Kennedy in the immediate aftermath of the JFK assassination
All the Way	2016	1963–1965	Lyndon Baines Johnson becomes the President of the United States in the chaotic aftermath of the Assassination of John F. Kennedy. He spends his first year in office fighting to pass the Civil Rights Act of 1964.
LBJ	2016	1963–1969	The story of President of the United States Lyndon Baines Johnson from his young days in West Texas to the White House.
Catch Me If You Can	2002	1963–1974	The life of Frank Abagnale, a con artist and famous check forger.
Ghosts of Mississippi	1996	1963–1990	Events surrounding the murder of NAACP field secretary Medgar Evers during the civil rights movement in Mississippi
The Kennedys: After Camelot	2017	1963–1994	Follow-up to the 2011 miniseries The Kennedys, the triumphs and tragedies of the Kennedy family.
The Theory of Everything	2014	1963–1998	The life of theoretical physicist Stephen Hawking.
1965	2014	1963–1966	Singapore in Malaysia, 1964 race riots in Singapore (Indonesia–Malaysia confrontation) and National Day of 1965
Mississippi Burning	1988	1964	The U.S. Federal Bureau of Investigation investigation into the murders of Chaney, Goodman, and Schwerner
The Doors	1991	1964–1971	Biopic about the 1960s–1970s rock band of the same name which emphasizes the life of its lead singer, Jim Morrison
The Year of Living Dangerously	1982	1965	Set in Indonesia during the overthrow of President Sukarno
Selma, Lord, Selma	1999	1965	Bloody Sunday
We Were Soldiers	2002	1965	The Battle of Ia Drang in the Vietnam War
An American Crime	2007	1965	The film tells the story of the torture and murder of Sylvia Likens by Indianapolis housewife Gertrude Baniszewski.
Selma	2014	1965	Selma to Montgomery march in Alabama during the civil rights movement
Born on the Fourth of July	1989	1965–1968	Ron Kovic's experiences in the Vietnam War
Rescue Dawn	2006	1966	Story of pilot Dieter Dengler being a POW serving in the Vietnam War.
Ford v Ferrari	2019	1966	American car designer Carroll Shelby and driver Ken Miles team up to build a revolutionary race car for Ford to defeat Ferrari at the Le Mans.
Coming Home	2014	1966–1976	Cultural Revolution in China.
Michael	2026	1966–1988	Early life of Michael Jackson.
W.	2008	1966–2003	The life and presidency of President of the United States George W. Bush
Platoon	1985	1967–1968	Vietnam War
Half of a Yellow Sun	2013	1967–1970	the Nigerian Civil War
Detroit	2017	1967	The 12th Street Riot in Detroit, Michigan
Coming Home	1978	1968	Vietnam War
Full Metal Jacket	1987	1968	Battle of Huế in the Vietnam War
Bobby	2006	1968	The assassination of Senator Robert F. Kennedy
Judy	2019	1968	American actress and singer Judy Garland performs a series of concerts in London in the last year of her life
Rose Island	2020	1968	Establishment of the Republic of Rose Island off the coast of Rimini
The Trial of the Chicago 7	2020	1968	Follows the story of the Chicago Seven
The Deer Hunter	1978	1968–1975	Vietnam War
The Damned United	2009	1968–1975	Brian Clough as manager of Derby County and Leeds United
American Gangster	2007	1968–1976	Frank Lucas and his heroin drug trade.
Hamburger Hill	1987	1969	Battle of Hamburger Hill in the Vietnam War
Apocalypse Now	1979	1969	Vietnam War
Four Days in September	1997	1969	Kidnapping of the United States Ambassador to Brazil, Charles Burke Elbrick, by members of 8th October Revolutionary Movement and Ação Libertadora Nacional
Chappaquiddick	2017	1969	Chronicles the untold story of Ted Kennedy and the Chappaquiddick incident during July 1969.
Once Upon a Time in Hollywood	2019	1969	follows an actor and his stunt double as they navigate the changing film industry in Los Angeles, set during the time of the Manson murders
Judas and the Black Messiah	2021	1969	The betrayal and assassination of Chicago based Black Panther Fred Hampton
Belfast	2021	1969	A young boy's childhood in Belfast, Northern Ireland during the Troubles
Secretariat	2010	1969–1973	Race horse Secretariat.
Nixon	1995	1969–1974	The political life of President of the United States Richard M. Nixon
Zodiac	2007	1969–1975	The Zodiac murders in Northern California
Apollo 13	1995	1970	Apollo 13 lunar mission
Dekada '70 (The 70s)	2002	1970	Based on the novel of the same name by Lualhati Bautista. The setting is the period of martial law in the Philippines, under the control of President Ferdinand Marcos.
We Are Marshall	2006	1970	It depicts the aftermath of the 1970 plane crash that killed 75 people: 37 players of the Marshall University Thundering Herd football team, five coaches, two athletic trainers, the athletic director, 25 boosters, and the airplane crew of five.
Inherent Vice	2014	1970	Based on the novel following detective Doc Sportello.
Elvis & Nixon	2016	1970	The untold true story behind the meeting between Elvis Presley, the King of rock and roll, and President Richard Nixon.
Misbehaviour	2020	1970	The disruption of the 1970 Miss World competition in London by the women's liberation movement
Roma	2018	1970–1971	The story of a Mixteco maid living in Mexico City during the Corpus Christi Massacre
Milk	2008	1970–1978	Gay rights activist Harvey Milk
Bohemian Rhapsody	2018	1970–1985	Follows the band Queen from their formation all the way to the Live Aid concert.
Diana: Her True Story	1993	1970–1992	The story of Diana, Princess of Wales, based on the publication of the same name by Andrew Morton.
Remember the Titans	2000	1971	Follows a desegregated high school's football team in 1970s Alexandria, Virginia
'71	2014	1971	Northern Ireland during The Troubles
The Post	2017	1971–1972	Journalists from The Washington Post and The New York Times who published the Pentagon Papers, regarding the United States' covert political and military involvement during the Vietnam War.
The Last King of Scotland	2006	1971–1976	President of Uganda Idi Amin
Whatever Love Means	2005	1971–1981	About Camilla Parker Bowles and Charles, Prince of Wales
Pirates of Silicon Valley	1999	1971–1997	Follows the growth of the personal computer industry through the lives of Bill Gates and Steve Jobs
All the President's Men	1976	1972	The Nixon-era Watergate scandal
Alive	1993	1972	Crash of Uruguayan Air Force Flight 571
Bloody Sunday	2002	1972	Bloody Sunday shootings in Northern Ireland
Cry Freedom	1987	1972–1978	Steve Biko and Donald Woods in the apartheid era of South Africa
Pawn Sacrifice	2014	1972	Bobby Fischer's 1972 World Chess Championship showdown against the Soviet Union's top player
Munich	2005	1972–1979	Mossad efforts to avenge the Munich massacre, the murder of Israeli athletes during the 1972 Summer Olympics
Missing	1982	1973	The 1973 Chilean coup d'état and the murder of Charles Horman
Colonia	2015	1973	The 1973 Chilean coup d'etat and the Colonia Dignidad
Vinyl	2016	1973	The musical industry in 1973.
All the Money in the World	2017	1973	The kidnapping of John Paul Getty III in July 1973.
Valley of Tears (TV Series)	2020	1973	The Yom Kippur War in October 1973.
The Killing Fields	1984	1973–1979	The Cambodian genocide under the Khmer Rouge regime of Pol Pot
Apollo 18	2011	1974	Found footage of classified Apollo 18 mission to the moon shows strange encounters
Jobs	2013	1974–2001	Biopic about the career of Steve Jobs
West Beirut	1998	1975	High school students living in Beirut during the outbreak of the Lebanese Civil War
The Amityville Horror	2005	1975	A year after the murders of the DeFeo family in Amity, New York another family moves into the house where the murders took place. Soon, it becomes clear that the house is haunted. The film was based on the novel The Amityville Horror (1977) by Jay Anson. The novel was inspired by real-life reports of a haunted house in Amity, and by the house's connection to six murders performed by former resident Ronald DeFeo Jr. in 1974.
Balibo	2009	1975	the Indonesian invasion of East Timor and the Balibo Five
Raid on Entebbe	1977	1976	The July 1976 rescue of passengers from a hijacked plane in Uganda by the IDF
Dazed and Confused	1993	1976	Based on Richard Linklater's life experiences.
Invincible	2006	1976–1978	story of Vince Papale, who played for the Philadelphia Eagles from 1976 to 1978
Summer of Sam	1999	1977	The Son of Sam murders in New York City
Frost/Nixon	2008	1977	the Frost-Nixon interviews
Romero	1989	1977–1980	The assassination of Archbishop Oscar Romero at the height of the Salvadorian Civil War
Boogie Nights	1997	1977–1984	Golden Age of Porn: The rise and fall of fictional pornographic film actor Dirk Diggler
Detroit Rock City	1999	1978	Four teenagers embark on a roadtrip from Columbus, Ohio, to Detroit, Michigan, to attend a concert by Kiss, their favourite band. The film is named after the song Detroit Rock City (1976) and depicts a concert within Cobo Center.
Gracie	2007	1978	Six years after the introduction of Title IX
American Hustle	2013	1978	Abscam operation
The Godfather: Part III	1990	1979	Aging Mafia Don Michael Corleone seeks to avow for his sins, while taking his nephew Vincent Mancini under his wing. The film is loosely based on the sudden death of Pope John Paul I (1978), whose entire term lasted 33 days, and the Banco Ambrosiano scandal (1981–1982).
54	1998	1979	The last year of Studio 54 in New York City.
Escape from Pretoria	2020	1979	The prison escape of three white South Africans, Tim Jenkins, Stephen Lee and Dennis Goldberg who were imprisoned for anti-Apartheid activism
Argo	2012	1979–1980	A portrayal of the CIA's role in the Canadian Caper.
The 9th Company	2005	1979–1989	Young Soviet Army recruits are stuck in the bloody War in Afghanistan, that was started by politicians.
The Iron Lady	2011	1979–1990	An elderly Margaret Thatcher talks to the imagined presence of her recently deceased husband Denis Thatcher, as she struggles to come to terms with his death. Scenes from her past life, from girlhood to her terms as Prime Minister of the United Kingdom, intervene.
House of Saddam	2008	1979–2006	A mini-series that explores the inner workings of President of Iraq Saddam Hussein's family and his relationship with his closest advisers.
Miracle	2004	1980	The United States men's national ice hockey team's gold medal victory at the 1980 Winter Olympics
The Falklands Play	2002	1980–1982	Diplomacy leading up to and during the Falklands War
Scarface	1983	1980–1983	Ruthless Cuban criminal Tony Montana arrives in Miami, Florida as part of the Mariel boatlift (1980) and builds a drug empire. The film was a remake of Scarface (1932), and dramatizes the war on drugs and the illegal drug trade.
The Reagans	2003	1980–1989	Legacy and career of Ronald Reagan and his wife, Nancy Reagan.
Charlie Wilson's War	2007	1980–1989	CIA's covert involvement in the Soviet–Afghan War
Walesa: Man of Hope	2013	1980–1989	Portrayal of Polish labor leader Lech Wałęsa and the Solidarity movement.
Oranges and Sunshine	2010	1980s	Based on the book Empty Cradles by Margaret Humphreys about her investigations in British Home Children.
Goodbye Bafana	2007	1980–1990	Nelson Mandela's imprisonment
Catch a Fire	2006	1980–1994	Set during the early 1980s concerning the plight of the ANC's military wing in the apartheid-era of South Africa
Wonderland	2003	1981	Wonderland murders
Hunger	2008	1981	1981 Irish hunger strike (Part of the Cold War and The Troubles)
The Americans	2013–2018	1981–1987	Spy thriller series detailing the lives of KGB agents posing as Americans during the Cold War.
Barry	2016	1981–2009	A look into the early life of President of the United States Barack Obama.
An Ungentlemanly Act	1992	1982	The first days of the Argentine invasion of the Falkland Islands
Tumbledown	1988	1982	Falklands War (Part of the Cold War and The Troubles)
Heartbreak Ridge	1986	1983	United States invasion of Grenada: A hard-nosed, hard-living Marine gunnery sergeant clashes with his superiors and his ex-wife, as he takes command of a spoiled recon platoon with a bad attitude.
Halt and Catch Fire	2014–2017	1983–1995	Set in the years from 1983 to 1995, the series depicts a fictionalized insider's view of the personal computer revolution of the 1980s and the growth of the World Wide Web in the early 1990s.
The Hunt for Red October	1990	1984	Soviet submarine during the late Cold War era
White Boy Rick	2018	1984–1987	Loosely based on the story of Richard Wershe Jr., who in the 1980s became the youngest FBI informant ever at the age of 14.
Steve Jobs	2015	1984–1998	Covers fourteen years of Steve Jobs' computing career
The Lives of Others	2006	1984–1993	In East Berlin, a Stasi agent is assigned to wire-tap a playwright and his lover, who are suspected to be disloyal to the GDR. However, the agent finds himself increasingly absorbed by their lives.
Paid in Full	2002	1985	During the Crack epidemic of the 1980s
Climber's High	2008	1985	Historical drama about Japan Air Lines Flight 123
Shizumanu Taiyō	2009	1985	Historical drama about Japan Air Lines Flight 123
Dallas Buyers Club	2013	1986	The story of Ron Woodroof who was diagnosed with AIDS during the AIDS epidemic
Chernobyl	2019	1986–1987	Mini-series depicting the Chernobyl disaster.
Donald Trump's The Art of the Deal: The Movie	2016	1986–2016	A satirical rendition of Donald Trump's 1987 best selling business book, The Art of the Deal.
Foxcatcher	2014	1986–1996	Wrestling coach John Eleuthère du Pont and Wrestlers Mark Schultz and Dave Schultz and the events of Foxcatcher farm in the lead up to, and following, the 1988 Summer Olympics.
Straight Outta Compton	2015	1986–1996	The story behind hip-hop group, N.W.A
Hamlet Goes Business	1987	1987	Based on William Shakespeare's play Hamlet, but the events are housed in a modern Finnish wood processing family business.
Endgame	2009	1987–1990	final days of apartheid in South Africa
Polytechnique	2009	1989	École Polytechnique massacre in Montreal
Narcos	2015	1989	Pablo Escobar rules the Medellín Cartel.
Atomic Blonde	2017	1989	Spy thriller set in the days before, during and after the Fall of the Wall
Good Bye, Lenin!	2003	1989–1990	Fall of the Berlin Wall and German reunification
Jarhead	2005	1989–1991	Gulf War
Beans	2020	1990	A young Mohawk girl lives through the Oka Crisis in Quebec
Tick, Tick... Boom!	2021	1990	Adaptation of musical by the same name as well as biopic of its creator Jonathan Larson
Joy	2015	1990–1995	Joy Mangano and the invention of the Miracle Mop
Three Kings	1999	1991	1991 Iraqi uprisings against Saddam Hussein and aftermath of the Gulf War and the Dissolution of the Soviet Union
The Perfect Storm	2000	1991	1991 Perfect Storm
Spencer	2021	1991	Princess Diana spends a Christmas with the British royal family at the Queen's Sandringham House
Invictus	2009	1991–1995	Post-apartheid South Africa and the 1995 Rugby World Cup
Sommeren '92	2015	1992	based on the 1992 UEFA European Football Championship, Denmark's greatest ever football triumph
Welcome to Sarajevo	1997	1992	Bosnian War
No Man's Land	2001	1992	Bosnian War
As If I Am Not There	2010	1992	Bosnian War
In the Land of Blood and Honey	2011	1992	Bosnian War
Snowtown	2011	1992–1999	Snowtown murders
Black Hawk Down	2001	1993	The Battle of Mogadishu, Somali Civil War
The Fighter	2010	1993	About boxer Micky Ward and his family
Hotel Rwanda	2004	1994	Assassination of Juvénal Habyarimana and Cyprien Ntaryamira and Rwandan genocide
Shooting Dogs	2005	1994	Rwandan genocide
Sometimes in April	2005	1994	Rwandan genocide
Shake Hands with the Devil	2007	1994	Rwandan genocide
The Special Relationship	2010	1994–2001	The United Kingdom–United States Special Relationship between Prime Minister of the United Kingdom Tony Blair and President of the United States Bill Clinton
Savior	1998	1995	During the Bosnian War in former Yugoslavia
Behind Enemy Lines	2001	1995	the Mrkonjić Grad incident during the Bosnian War in former Yugoslavia
Pain & Gain	2013	1995	Based on the criminal activities of the short-lived Sun Gym gang (1994–1995) of Miami Lakes, Florida, which consisted mostly of bodybuilders. In the film, a trio of bodybuilders in Florida get caught up in an extortion ring and a kidnapping scheme that goes terribly wrong.
Diana	2013	1995–1997	Depicts the last two years of Diana, Princess of Wales's life, from her divorce from Prince Charles to her death in 1997
Bernie	2011	1996	Murder of Marjorie Nugent by Bernie Tiede
Everest	2015	1996	Based on the real events of the 1996 Mount Everest disaster
The Queen	2006	1997	A fictional account of the immediate events following the death of Diana, Princess of Wales
Diana: Last Days of a Princess	2007	1997	A fairly accurate (albeit semi-fictionalized) account of the last two months in the life of Diana, Princess of Wales, leading up to her death on 31 August 1997.
Open Water	2003	1998	Based on the true story of the disappearance of Tom and Eileen Lonergan.
I'm Not Ashamed	2016	1998–1999	Based on the writings of Rachel Scott
American Sniper	2014	1998–2011	Based on the 2012 memoir of former US Navy SEAL, Chris Kyle
Coach Carter	2005	1999	Story of high school basketball coach Ken Carter who suspended his team due to poor academic results
The Rookie	2002	1999–2000	The story of Jim Morris, an American baseball player who reached the major leagues at the age of 35
Blood Diamond	2006	1999–2000	During the Sierra Leone Civil War
Alpha Dog	2006	1999–2000	Based on the true story of the kidnapping and murder of Nicholas Markowitz in 2000

== Films set in the information era (after 2000) ==
Title	Release date	Time period	Historical background
Holy Spider	2022	2000–2002	Iranian serial killer Saeed Hanaei
Mary: The Making of a Princess	2015	2000-2004	the relationship between Mary Donaldson and Prince Frederik
World Trade Center	2006	2001	September 11 attacks
United 93	2006	2001	September 11 attacks
Flight 93	2006	2001	September 11 attacks
William & Kate: The Movie	2011	2001	the relationship between Prince William and Catherine "Kate" Middleton (now The Prince and Princess of Wales)
Diaz – Don't Clean Up This Blood	2012	2001	The 2001 G8 Summit in Genoa, Italy and the storming of the Armando Diaz school by police
Spotlight	2015	2001	The Boston Globe's investigative story on the Sexual abuse scandal in the Catholic archdiocese of Boston and the September 11 attacks
Zero Dark Thirty	2012	2001–2012	The finding and assassination of Osama Bin Laden
Moneyball	2011	2002	Based on Michael Lewis's 2003 nonfiction book of the same name, an account of the Oakland Athletics baseball team's 2002 season and their general manager Billy Beane's attempts to assemble a competitive team.
The Dropout	2022	2002–2017	Disgraced biotechnology company Theranos and its founder Elizabeth Holmes
The Social Network	2010	2003–2007	The founding of the social networking service-website Facebook
Generation Kill	2008	March–April 2003	U.S. soldiers in Iraq during the initial phase of the Iraq War.
127 Hours	2010	April 2003	The true story about Aron Ralston, a mountain climber who had his arm trapped by a boulder while climbing in an isolated slot canyon in Utah.
The Hurt Locker	2008	2004	the Iraq War, just before the 2004 Indian Ocean tsunami
The Impossible	2012	2004	The 2004 Indian Ocean tsunami, from the viewpoint of a tourist family in Thailand
Lone Survivor	2013	2005	Based on the 2007 non-fiction book of the same name about Operation Red Wings by Marcus Luttrell and Patrick Robinson
The Big Short	2015	2005–2008	Based on the 2010 book of the same name, about numerous financial experts who predict and proceed to take advantage of the 2008 financial crisis
Warfare	2025	2006	Based on the experiences of Ray Mendoza during the Iraq War as a U.S. Navy SEAL, the film depicts an encounter on 19 November 2006 after the Battle of Ramadi
The Fifth Estate	2013	2007–2010	About Julian Assange and the foundation of his news-leaking site WikiLeaks
Too Big to Fail	2011	2008	The 2008 financial crisis
Million Dollar Arm	2014	2008	the story of Indian baseball pitchers Rinku Singh and Dinesh Patel
Captain Phillips	2013	2009	Kidnapping of merchant mariner Richard Phillips by Somalian pirates
Sully	2016	2009	the story of Captain Chesley "Sully" Sullenberger and the aftermath of US Airways Flight 1549
The 33	2015	2010	Rescuing miners in the 2010 Chilean mine disaster
Deepwater Horizon	2016	2010	Deepwater Horizon explosion
13 Hours: The Secret Soldiers of Benghazi	2016	2012	2012 Benghazi attack: During an attack on a U.S. compound in Benghazi, Libya, a security team struggles to make sense out of the chaos.
Uncut Gems	2019	2012	Kevin Garnett's performance in the 2012 NBA Eastern Conference Semi-finals
Patriots Day	2016	2013	The Boston Marathon bombing.
Daniel	2019	2013–2014	the experiences of Daniel Rye who was held hostage by ISIS for 13 months
The Correspondent	2024	2014–2015	The detainment of Al Jazeera journalists in Cairo, Egypt and the efforts to extradite Australian Peter Greste
Operation Red Sea	2018	2015	The People's Liberation Army Navy entered the Yemeni Civil War and the International military intervention against ISIL.
Zola	2021	2015	Based on a viral Twitter thread about a part-time stripper who is convinced to travel to Tampa by her new friend for a gig.
Brexit: The Uncivil War	2019	2015–2016	The lead up to the 2016 Brexit referendum from the perspective of strategists in the Vote Leave campaign
Al Kameen	2021	2018	Emirati soldiers fight Houthi rebels in Yemen during the Yemeni civil war (2014-present)

== See also ==
- Lists of historical films
- List of war films and TV specials
  - List of World War II films
- List of films set in ancient Rome
- List of films set in ancient Greece
- List of films set in ancient Egypt
- List of films based on Greco-Roman mythology
- List of films featuring dinosaurs
- List of films based on actual events
- Lists of Western films
- Middle Ages in film
  - List of films based on Arthurian legend
- Asian period drama films
  - Jidaigeki
  - Samurai cinema
- Historical drama
- Historical fantasy
- Historical fiction
- Alternate history

== Sources ==
- Albertz, Rainer (2003). Israel in Exile: The History and Literature of the Sixth Century B.C.E. Society of Biblical Literature. ISBN 9781589830554.
