= Anne Elliot =

- Persuasion character
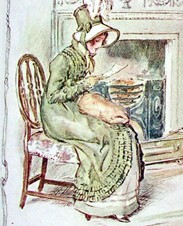
- Anne Elliot as drawn by C.E. Brock (1909)

In-universe information
- Gender: Female
- Family: Sir Walter Elliot, Baronet (father)
- Home: Kellynch Hall

Anne Elliot is the protagonist of Jane Austen's sixth and last completed novel, Persuasion (1817).

Anne Elliot was persuaded, when she was 19 years old, to break off her engagement with Frederick Wentworth, a promising young lieutenant in the Royal Navy but a commoner without fortune, and she has never married. Lonely, unloved by a stuck-up and pretentious father and older sister, and little considered by a family circle incapable of recognising her value, she leads a dull life of an almost-old maid. However, 7 or 8 years after the naval war with France ended, in September 1814, Frederick Wentworth, whom she has never forgotten, returns to England having earned prestige and fortune in the navy. The first contacts are painful. He has retained an image of her as a person too easily influenced, and she sees clearly that he is still angry with her. But seven years on, she has matured and gained enough independence from her family and social circle to choose her friends and her future.

The posthumously published novel by Jane Austen presents the portrait of an independent spirit, a young, intelligent and melancholic woman, sensitive and attentive to others, who regains her self-confidence when she is given a second chance to find happiness, a very different happiness from other Austenian heroines, since she marries neither a land owner nor a clergyman, but a ship's captain. She would be "proud of being the wife of a sailor" but she would also know its anxieties and its sorrows. She is considered the most lucid and responsible Austenian heroine and the reader is privy in a special way to her thoughts, which are of an exactitude and a perceptiveness unparalleled in the heroines of previous novels.

== Introduction ==
Jane Austen, in a letter to her niece Fanny Knight dated 13 March 1816, after reminding her how "Pictures of perfection, as you know, make me sick and wicked", mentions the heroine of the novel she is in the process of writing, with some irony: "You may perhaps like the heroine, as she is almost too good for me."

Anne is both the main character in Persuasion and the secondary narrator. Indeed, only her view of events is available to the reader. None of the heroines of the prior novels is as visibly the center of convergence of the action and the main point of view, since the narrator does not openly pull the strings of the plot and avoids directing irony at Anne. On the contrary, it is she who perceives the events and the people with much finesse, a keen sense of observation and analysis, and most of the time it is from her that the reader learns the details of the plot; it is on her alone, to whom the author gives complete freedom to express her feelings and her unwavering commitment to Wentworth, that the resolution ultimately depends.

== Description ==
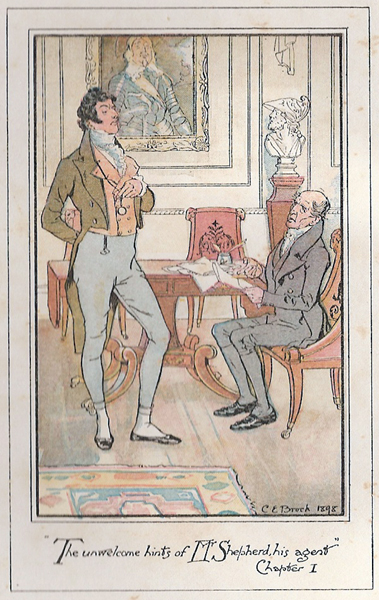
At fifty-four years old, Sir Walter remained extremely vain of his person and his situation.

Anne is the overlooked middle daughter of a narcissistic and extravagant baronet, Sir Walter Elliot of Kellynch Hall. The oldest of Jane Austen's heroines, she is 26 or 27 years old at the beginning of the novel and is seemingly a confirmed spinster. Her mother is dead, her father, Sir Walter and older sister, Elizabeth are vain and selfish. Her younger sister, Mary, is a manipulative hypochondriac, but not quite so beyond Anne's influence as Elizabeth. With few to appreciate her sweet nature and refined, elegant mind, Anne is somewhat isolated, living in a narrow social sphere where she "was nobody with either father or sister; her word had no weight; her convenience was always to give way; she was only Anne."

Lady Russell, her late mother's best friend, is Anne's only real confidante; and although Lady Russell means well and usually shows good judgment, she tends to put great value on social position when forming her opinions. This preference has caused Anne great sorrow: eight years before, Lady Russell persuaded her to break off an engagement with an ambitious, promising young naval officer named Frederick Wentworth— a man whom Anne loved passionately—on the grounds that his poverty, lack of social rank and connections made him an unsuitable choice.

Anne has never fully recovered from the heartbreak, and begins Persuasion as a sad figure, disregarded by her father, "wretchedly altered" in looks, looked down upon by her elder sister and resigned to an empty life. When Captain Wentworth, now rich from prize money, returns from the Napoleonic Wars to visit the neighbourhood, Anne is at first pained; however, his presence gradually sets her life in motion again.

== Literary significance ==
Persuasion manifests a significant shift in Austen's attitude toward inherited wealth and rank. Elsewhere in her writing, salvation for the heroine comes in the form of marriage to a well-born gentleman, preferably wealthy and at least her equal in social consequence. Elizabeth Bennet (Pride and Prejudice), for example, who has little money of her own, refuses the hand of a financially secure but unbearable young clergyman; befriends briefly a penniless (and, as it turns out, utterly worthless) army officer; and finally marries Mr. Fitzwilliam Darcy, who has a great estate, a Norman-sounding name, and £10,000 a year. Emma Woodhouse (Emma), already wealthy and secure, marries 37-year-old George Knightley, a man not only from her own class, but from her extended family; and Marianne Dashwood (Sense and Sensibility) loses her heart to a charming young wastrel, but then marries the virtuous Colonel Brandon, a man of property twice her age. Anne Elliot's "true attachment and constancy" to a dashing, self-made young outsider distinguishes her from all other Austen heroines.

In Persuasion, hereditary aristocracy is held up to ridicule: the 'eligible' suitor, Mr. Elliot, turns out to be a scoundrel, while the village patriarch, Sir Walter Elliot, is not only "foolish" and "spendthrift" but also absurdly proud of his baronetcy. To fill the void, Austen sets up a sort of rising meritocracy made up of successful officers in the Royal Navy. Sir Walter and his daughter Elizabeth cede their position as landed gentry when they let Kellynch Hall to Admiral Croft. As Austen makes clear, these Elliots are unworthy of their high social status; they are also unworthy of Anne, a natural aristocrat who languishes, disregarded, until she reunites with Captain Wentworth. In effect, Anne escapes from her meaningless life as an Elliot to join the Navy.

Lady Russell overvalues inherited social class and so underestimates Wentworth and nearly cheats Anne of her only chance of happiness. When circumstances prove both the captain's worthiness and the corresponding worthlessness of fellow suitor Mr. Elliot, Lady Russell herself—the very voice of benevolent propriety—has to "admit that she had been pretty completely wrong and to take up a new set of opinions and hopes."

== Film and TV portrayals ==
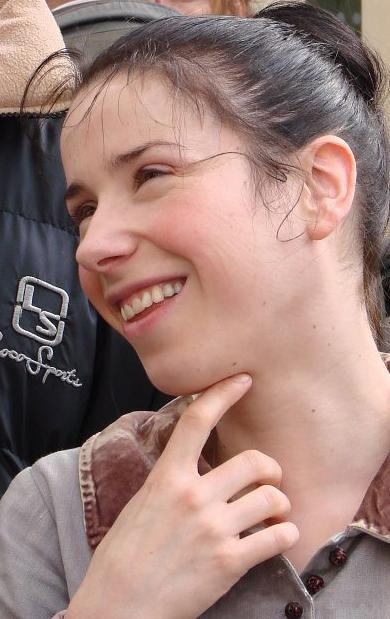
Sally Hawkins, while filming Persuasion.

- 1960: Daphne Slater, BBC series
- 1971: Anne Firbank, BBC series Persuasion
- 1995: Amanda Root, made-for-television Persuasion
- 2007: Sally Hawkins, ITV1 Persuasion
- 2022: Dakota Johnson, Netflix film Persuasion
