= Persuasion (2007 film) =

2007 television film directed by Adrian Shergold

- DVD cover
- Based on: Persuasion by Jane Austen
- Written by: Simon Burke
- Directed by: Adrian Shergold
- Starring: Sally Hawkins; Rupert Penry-Jones
- Theme music composer: Martin Phipps
- Country of origin: United Kingdom
- Original language: English

Production
- Producer: David Snodin
- Cinematography: David Odd
- Editor: Kristina Hetherington
- Running time: 92 minutes
- Production companies: Clerkenwell Films; WGBH Boston

Original release
- Network: ITV
- Release: 1 April 2007

Persuasion is a 2007 British historical romance television film adaptation of Jane Austen's 1817 novel Persuasion. It was directed by Adrian Shergold, and the screenplay was written by Simon Burke. Sally Hawkins stars as the protagonist Anne Elliot, while Rupert Penry-Jones plays Captain Frederick Wentworth. Eight years before the film's beginning, Anne was persuaded to reject Wentworth's proposal of marriage. Now 27 and unmarried, Anne re-encounters Wentworth, who has made his fortune in the Napoleonic Wars and is looking for a wife—anyone but Anne, whom he has not forgiven for rejecting him all those years ago.

Persuasion was one of three novels adapted in 2007 for ITV's Jane Austen Season. It was the first of the three adaptations to begin development. The drama was co-produced by Clerkenwell Films and American studio WGBH Boston. Persuasion premiered on 1 April 2007 in the United Kingdom and was watched by 5.4 million viewers. Persuasion received positive reviews from television critics.

== Plot ==
The Elliot family face financial difficulties from the imprudent spending of baronet Sir Walter Elliot and his eldest daughter, Elizabeth. His lawyer proposes that the family estate, Kellynch Hall, be leased to Admiral Croft as a source of income, but middle daughter Anne Elliot is distraught at the prospect of having to abandon her childhood home.

The admiral is married to Sophie, sister of Captain Frederick Wentworth, a naval captain to whom Anne was engaged eight years earlier. Wentworth was then penniless and without a ship at the outset of a dangerous career, and the union was discouraged by Sir Walter and Anne's surrogate mother, Lady Russell, who convinced her to break off the engagement. Years later, Anne is seemingly past marriageable age, while Wentworth, now risen in rank and wealthy from prize money, is eager to find a wife.

Sir Walter and Elizabeth depart for Bath with Elizabeth's companion, Mrs. Clay. Anne goes to stay with her younger sister Mary, who is married to Charles Musgrove and lives on the Musgrove family's estate at nearby Uppercross. Wentworth visits his sister at Kellynch and makes friends with the Musgroves. Anne and Wentworth meet again, but he appears cold and distant. She is convinced that he will never forgive her, nor love her again. Her disappointment is worsened by the attention Wentworth is given by Charles' sisters, Louisa and Henrietta, both younger and more desired than her.

Wentworth intends to travel to Lyme to visit his comrades, Captains Harville and Benwick; the Musgroves and Anne go as well. In Lyme, Benwick has been inconsolable since the death of his fiancée (Harville's sister) while he was at the Cape and spends his days reading poetry and lamenting his loss. Familiar with books, loss and disappointment, Anne can encourage Benwick.

In a dangerous demonstration of steadfastness, Louisa jumps from the Cobb seawall towards Wentworth, slipping and striking her head. Unconscious, she is taken to Harville's home to recover. Wentworth escorts Anne and Henrietta back to Uppercross to inform Louisa's parents of her injury. Anne and Wentworth bid each other a seemingly final farewell.

Anne joins her father and sister in Bath, where they have been receiving the attentions of William Elliot, a cousin who is the heir presumptive to Sir Walter's estate and baronetcy. He is wealthy and gracious to the Elliots. Anne finds herself the subject of his interest, but detects a false note in his manner.

While Louisa recovers, Wentworth realises his feelings towards Anne are unchanged, but Harville informs him that an attachment is assumed between Wentworth and Louisa. Dismayed, Wentworth takes Harville's advice to leave and visits his brother in Shropshire. Returning a few weeks later, he learns that Louisa and Benwick are engaged. Delighted at this, Wentworth goes to Bath under the pretext of visiting his sister.

Wentworth learns that William Elliot has been courting Anne. Having heard rumours of William's proposal, Admiral Croft sends Wentworth to tell Anne that if she and William wish to reside at Kellynch after their wedding, he would be willing to cancel his lease. To Wentworth's surprise, Anne tells him the admiral is mistaken, as she has not consented to marry William. They are interrupted by the arrival of Lady Russell and are unable to speak privately. Wentworth slips away and subsequently writes a note for Anne, confessing his long-held love and his desire to marry her.

Anne excuses herself from the visitors and runs after Wentworth, but cannot find him. She encounters her good friend Mrs. Smith, who informs her that William has been deceitful. He covets the baronetcy and had secretly planned to install Mrs. Clay as his mistress once his marriage to Anne was consummated, thus preventing Mrs. Clay from accepting Sir Walter's marriage proposal and the possible birth of a son who would have ruined his claim to the estate. Anne continues her search for Wentworth and meets Harville, who gives her Wentworth's note.

Anne finally finds Wentworth and accepts his proposal. Wentworth asks if she is sure she is willing to marry him. Anne replies that she has never been more determined in her life and kisses him.

== Cast ==
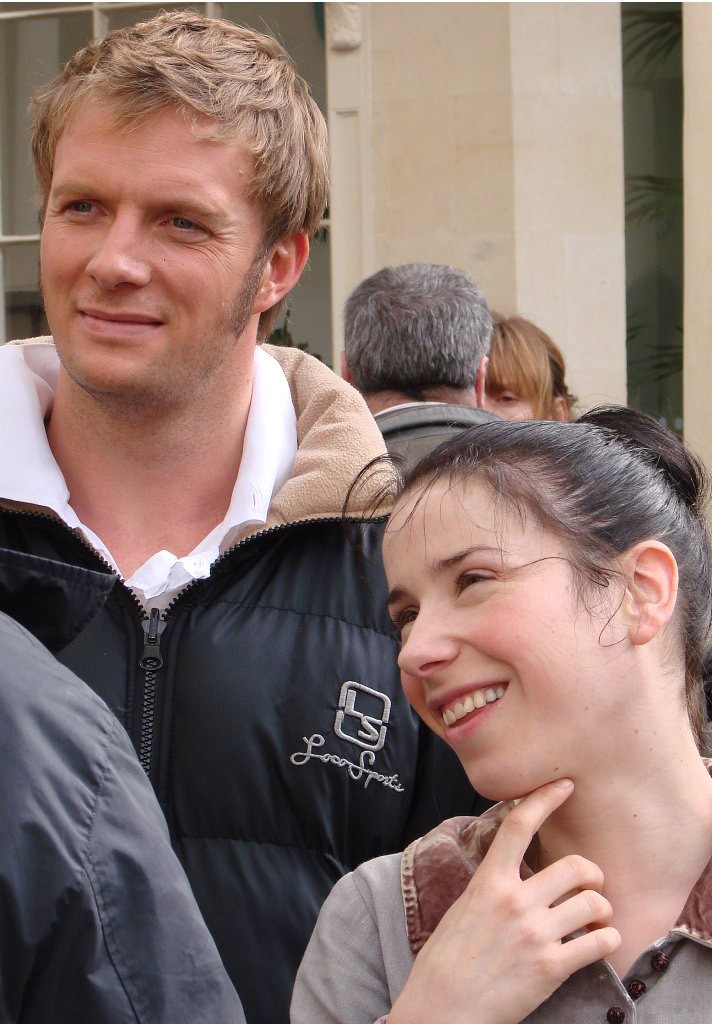
Rupert Penry-Jones and Sally Hawkins during filming

- Sally Hawkins as Anne Elliot
- Rupert Penry-Jones as Captain Frederick Wentworth
- Anthony Head as Sir Walter Elliot
- Julia Davis as Elizabeth Elliot
- Alice Krige as Lady Russell
- Tobias Menzies as William Elliot, Anne's distant cousin
- Michael Fenton Stevens as Mr. Shepherd
- Mary Stockley as Mrs. Clay
- Joseph Mawle as Captain Harry Harville
- Finlay Robertson as Captain James Benwick
- Nicholas Farrell as Mr. Musgrove
- Stella Gonet as Mrs. Musgrove
- Amanda Hale as Mary Musgrove, Anne's sister
- Sam Hazeldine as Charles Musgrove
- Jennifer Higham as Louisa Musgrove
- Rosamund Stephen as Henrietta Musgrove
- Peter Wight as Admiral Croft
- Marion Bailey as Mrs. Croft, Frederick's sister
- Maisie Dimbleby as Mrs. Smith
- Sarah Buckland as Nurse Rooke
- Tilly Tremayne as Vicountess Dalrymple

== Production ==
=== Conception and adaptation ===
On 10 November 2005, The Guardian's Julia Day reported ITV controller of drama, Nick Elliott, had ordered three new adaptations of Mansfield Park, Northanger Abbey and Persuasion. Elliott commented that the adaptations would be "important remakes for the new generation". He explained, "About every 10 years, all the great stories need retelling. These films will be very much 2007 films... we've asked and pushed the production team to make them young." Screenwriter Simon Burke created the convention of a diary to aide the audience in understanding the intense feelings of loss that the outwardly reserved Anne Elliot was going through. Using small parts of Austen's narration, he placed it in the hands of Anne. After much reading and research, Hawkins came to view the character of Anne Elliot as a view of Jane Austen herself. With Hawkins' over-voicing the diary entries, the person of Jane Austen is brought to life. This, coupled with director Adrian Shergold having Anne occasionally break the Fourth wall, lent a sense of intimacy between the audience and the lead character, and with Jane Austen.

Elliott revealed that he had deliberately shied away from ordering adaptations of Pride and Prejudice and Sense and Sensibility to focus on Austen's lesser known works. Each of the three productions created during the Jane Austen Season was made by a different company, cast and director, so they each had "a distinct look".

=== Casting ===
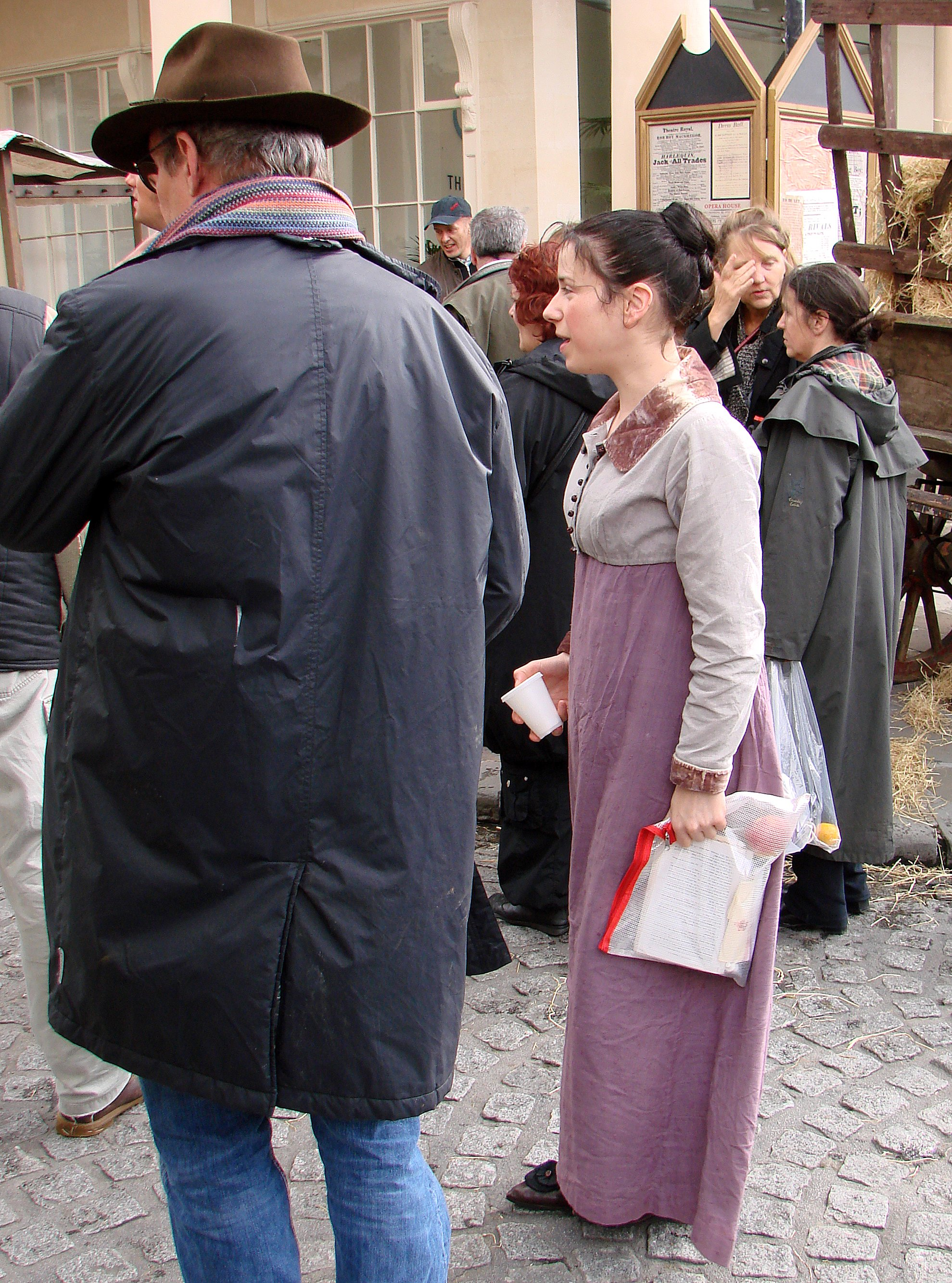
Hawkins in Bath during location shooting, 2006

Karen Price from the Western Mail reported ITV had promised the "cream of British acting talent", while they were casting the three adaptations. Actress Sally Hawkins was asked to play Persuasion's protagonist Anne Elliot. Hawkins was familiar with Austen from school, and though flattered to be asked to play the role, she was initially hesitant about returning to Austen. "I re-read the books and fell in love with Jane Austen completely... I had been slightly dismissive, and the fact that I was dismissive is shameful to me now. It's like being dismissive of Dickens or Beckett. Her work had never really come into my world before and I'm so glad it has." Having re-read all of Austen's works, she researched deeper, reading the author's personal letters and biographies. Speaking to The Independent's Amy Raphael, Hawkins explained "Jane was an incredible woman. She was only in her early forties when she died. I became convinced that Persuasion was about her own love life; Anne Elliot took the wrong advice and left the man who turned out to be the love of her life. She is the type of woman you'd like to be: reserved, refined, funny. I totally fell in love with her."

On 17 September 2006, the Western Mail's Nathan Bevan revealed that Spooks actor Rupert Penry-Jones had joined the cast as Captain Wentworth. The role was Penry-Jones' first lead part in a costume drama. He remarked, "In modern drama everything is so overt. In period drama it's all held in. You have to find ways to show the feelings straining beneath the surface." The actor added that he enjoyed playing Wentworth "because, beyond his social grace and charm, there's a bitterness and sadness because the love of his life, Anne Elliot, rejected him." Five days later, it was announced that Julia Davis and Anthony Head would be appearing as Elizabeth Elliot and Sir Walter Elliot, respectively.

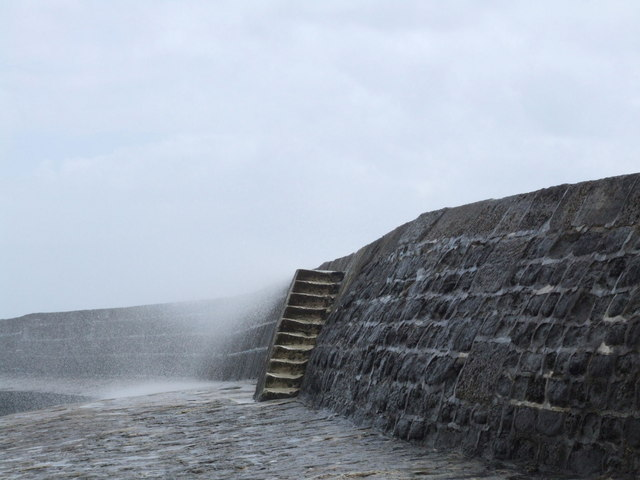
The Cobb harbour wall at Lyme

=== Costumes ===
The costume designer for Persuasion was Andrea Galer. Galer made Anne's outfits simple and basic because she does not join Bath society. The designer explained, "I wanted her to look in tune with nature. Because we were shooting in winter, I could go for faded autumnal colours for her. She gets Wentworth back just by her stillness, and I wanted to reflect that in her wardrobe." Galer designed a jacket for Hawkins to wear as Anne, using a 19th-century shawl, which she mounted and patched together with a cross stitch. She used hand loom fabric from India and the Sri Lankan crafted Beeralu lace to decorate some of the garments. In 2008, costumes from Persuasion went on display at the Jane Austen Centre in Bath. The exhibition included creations worn by Anne, Lady Russell and the Musgrove sisters. Four years later, many of the costumes from Persuasion and Miss Austen Regrets were sold in an online auction organised by the Jane Austen Centre. Galer admitted that while it was difficult to part with them, it was time to move on, and she hoped they had been bought because of their association with the Austen films. Galer commented, "It was difficult to do, but I did it. I suppose the one outfit that did sell that I would've been happy if it hadn't was the Harris tweed jacket and dress worn by Sally Hawkins when she played Anne Elliot in Persuasion."

=== Filming ===
Persuasion was the first of the three adaptations to begin development. For the director, ITV hired Adrian Shergold, known for working on "gritty" films such as Pierrepoint (2005). Producer David Snodin explained, "Bringing Adrian on board is a statement in itself because he is not known for doing conventional versions of the classics. It is a lot to do with the way he likes the camera to move – it's right in on people's faces – and he is creating something much more contemporary than you'd expect." Shergold agreed to direct Persuasion only after learning Hawkins was playing Anne Elliot. He said, "She inhabits every inch of the characters she plays."

The film was scored by Martin Phipps.

== Promotion and broadcast ==
ITV launched a nationwide campaign to promote its Jane Austen Season. The campaign included three television adverts and cinema, outdoor and press adverts. ITV Creative made the 20, 30 and 60 second promotional trailers, which began airing on ITV channels from 25 February 2007. The following day, adverts began appearing in selected national press publications. The outdoor and press adverts were created by M&C Saatchi, while MindShare carried out the media buying.

Persuasion was the third of the Austen adaptations to be shown in the UK. It was broadcast on ITV at 9:00 pm on 1 April 2007. The drama aired on the TVOntario channel in Canada on 30 December 2007. Persuasion was shown on 13 January 2008 on the US channel PBS as part of their Austen Masterpiece Theatre series. On 8 June, the film was broadcast on Australia's ABC1 channel.

== Reception ==
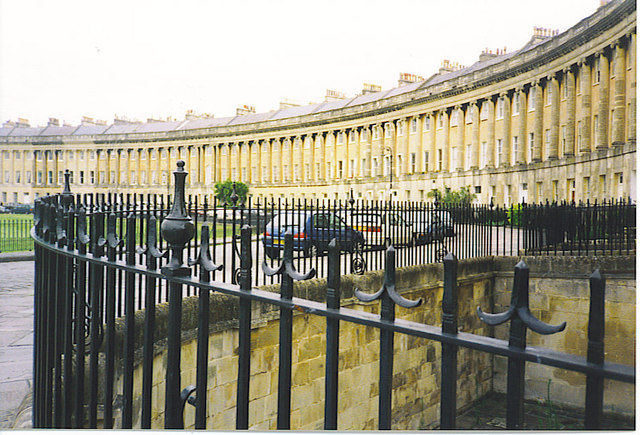
The Royal Crescent, where Anne accepts the proposal of Captain Wentworth

Persuasion was well received by audiences, attracting 6.2 million viewers and a 26.1% audience share upon its initial broadcast in the United Kingdom. 939,000 Australian viewers watched the drama when it aired on ABC1 in June 2008. Four newspaper publications selected the drama as their "Pick of the Day." The period drama has an 80% approval rating on Rotten Tomatoes.

Critics compared the production with previous renditions of Persuasion and with other productions of well known Austen works. The Daily Post chose Persuasion as "the best of the three offerings in this series." However, Matthew Gilbert of The Boston Globe opined that the adaptation "pale[d] in comparison with the extraordinary 1995 version." David Wiegand of the San Francisco Chronicle expressed strong dissatisfaction with the adaptation, especially when compared to the 1995 Pride and Prejudice series and the 1996 production of Emma.

The performance by Hawkins was well received by most. Variety noted Persuasion "offers an appealing heroine, with Hawkins proving especially vulnerable as the passive Anne, who again risks letting a lifetime of happiness slip away from her." Conversely, the Irish Independent's John Boland called Hawkins the "crucial flaw" of the production. Boland continued, "She looked suitably guarded and gauche at the outset but then chose, and was allowed, to become increasingly gormless, so that long before the end you were left wondering what on earth Captain Wentworth had ever seen in this open-mouthed, inarticulate eejit. It was the worst piece of miscasting since Tom Cruise was asked to impersonate an icy hit-man in Collateral." The Age thought Penry-Jones too handsome for the role of Captain Wentworth.

The Independent reported that Janeites were "horrified by the inappropriate kissing" in the adaptation.

=== Awards and nominations ===
Persuasion garnered a nomination for Best Drama at the 2007 Prix Italia. For her portrayal of Anne Elliot, Hawkins was named Best Actress at the Royal Television Society Awards, and she won the Best Performance by an Actress in a Television Film award at the Monte-Carlo Television Festival. Davis and Krige also received nominations in the same category, while Head and Penry-Jones were both nominated for Best Performance by an Actor in a Television Film. At the 2007 RTS Craft & Design Awards, Kevin Horsewood won the Best Visual Effects – Picture Enhancement award. Shergold earned a nomination in the Director of Fiction/Entertainment category at the 2008 British Academy Television Craft Awards.
