= Persuasion (novel) =

1818 novel by Jane Austen

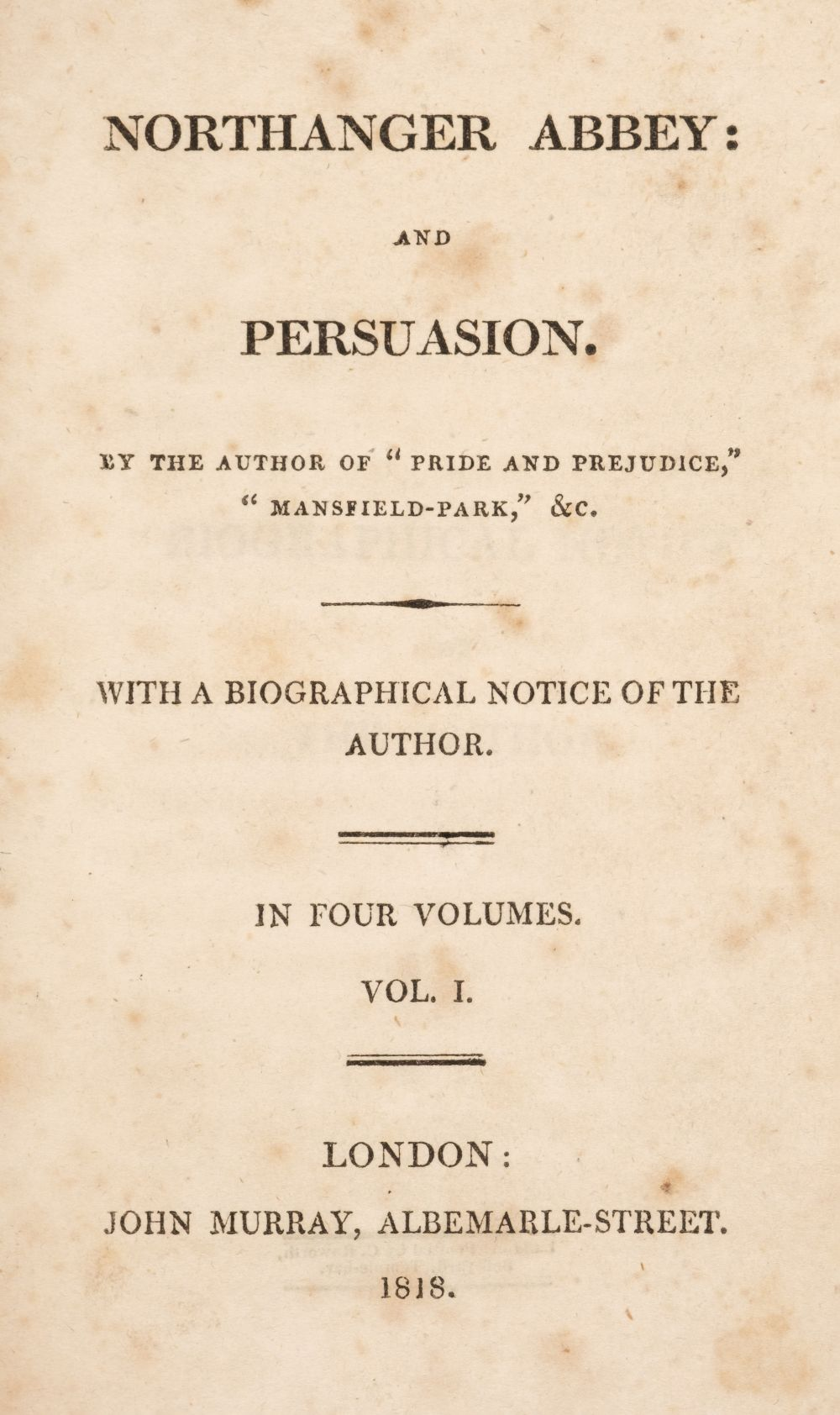
- Title page of the original 1818 edition
- Author: Jane Austen
- Language: English
- Publisher: John Murray
- Publication date: 1818 (published on 20 December 1817, although the title page is dated 1818)
- Publication place: United Kingdom
- Text: Persuasion at Wikisource

Persuasion is the last novel completed by the English author Jane Austen. It was published with Northanger Abbey on 20 December 1817, six months after her death, although the title page is dated 1818.

The story concerns Anne Elliot, a 27-year-old Englishwoman whose family moves to Bath to lower their expenses and reduce their debt by renting their estate to an admiral and his wife. Eight years before, Anne and the wife's brother, Captain Frederick Wentworth, had been engaged, but Anne had been persuaded by her friends and family to break the engagement. Now Anne and Captain Wentworth meet again, setting the scene for the story.

The novel was well received in the early 19th century, but its greater fame came later in the century and continued into the 20th and 21st centuries. Scholars consider Anne Elliot Austen’s most mature heroine and the novel her most refined literary work. As in her other novels, her innovative and distinctive use of free indirect speech enables her narrator to convey her characters’ inner thoughts, including their self-deceptions and their growing understanding of themselves and others.

Persuasion has been the subject of many adaptations, including made-for-television adaptations, theatre productions, radio broadcasts, and derivative literary works.

== Plot ==
The novel is set seven years after the broken engagement of Anne Elliot to Frederick Wentworth. At that time, Anne, having just turned 19, had fallen in love and accepted a proposal of marriage from Wentworth, who was then a young and as yet undistinguished naval officer. Wentworth was considered clever, confident and ambitious, but his lack of social status and wealth made Anne's family — her vain father, Sir Walter Elliot, and her older sister Elizabeth — view him as an unsuitable match for the daughter of a baronet. Lady Russell, a distant relative whom Anne had considered a second mother since the death of her own, also saw the relationship as imprudent for one so young and persuaded Anne to break off the engagement. Sir Walter, Elizabeth, and Lady Russell are the only family members who knew about the short engagement, as Anne's younger sister, Mary, was away at school.

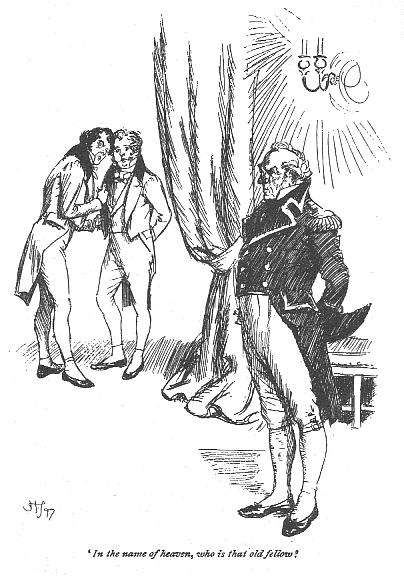
An illustration by Hugh Thomson of a moment in chapter three, when Sir Walter regards Admiral Baldwin and asks Sir Basil Morley, "In the name of heaven, who is that old fellow?"

Several years later the Elliot family are in financial trouble on account of Sir Walter's lavish spending. This had been kept in check while Lady Elliot was alive, but Sir Walter and Elizabeth have since spent without thought. Forced into action at last, they are persuaded to let Kellynch Hall, the family estate, and settle in Bath until their finances improve. Sir Walter, Elizabeth, and Elizabeth's new companion, Mrs Clay, look forward to the move. Anne, on the other hand, doubts she will enjoy Bath but cannot go against her family. Mary is now married to Charles Musgrove of Uppercross Hall, the heir to a respected local squire. Anne visits Mary and her family, where she is well loved. As the Napoleonic Wars are over, Admiral Croft and his wife Sophia (Frederick's sister) become the new tenants of Kellynch Hall. Captain Wentworth, now wealthy from prize ships he captured in the war, visits his sister and meets the Uppercross family, where he crosses paths with Anne.

The Musgroves — including Mary, Charles, and Charles's sisters Henrietta and Louisa — welcome the Crofts and Captain Wentworth, who makes it clear that he is ready to marry. Both the Crofts and the Musgroves enjoy speculating about which sister Wentworth might marry. The Musgroves' cousin, the young clergyman Charles Hayter, who is absent when Wentworth is introduced to their social circle, returns and is rather upset over Henrietta's apparent interest in Wentworth as Hayter has been wooing her. However, when Charles Hayter stops visiting so often, Henrietta realises where her true affections lie, and now it seems that a match between Louisa and Wentworth will soon follow. Anne still loves Wentworth, so each meeting with him requires preparation for her own strong emotions. She overhears a conversation in which Louisa tells Wentworth that Charles Musgrove had first proposed to Anne, who turned him down; so he later married Mary. This news startles Wentworth, and Anne realises that he has not yet forgiven her for letting herself be persuaded to end their engagement years ago.

Anne and the young adults of the Uppercross family accompany Captain Wentworth on a visit to see two of his fellow officers, Captains Harville and Benwick, in the coastal town of Lyme Regis. Captain Benwick is in mourning over the death of his fiancée, Captain Harville's sister Fanny, and he appreciates Anne's sympathy and understanding, helped by their mutual admiration for the Romantic poets. At Lyme, Anne attracts the attention of a young man they later learn is William Elliot, her cousin and a wealthy widower who is heir to Kellynch Hall; he broke ties with his family years earlier and was reported to have spoken disrespectfully of Sir Walter and Elizabeth. On the last morning of the visit, Louisa sustains a serious concussion after willfully insisting on jumping from the Cobb seawall a second time, expecting to be caught again by Wentworth. He tries to dissuade her from such a big jump, but she is determined and jumps a fraction of a second before Wentworth is ready. Anne organises others to summon assistance. Wentworth is impressed with Anne's quick thinking and cool-headedness but feels guilty about his actions concerning Louisa. He now sees that his encouraging her to never allow anyone to persuade her to anything was a serious error, resulting in her injury. This causes him to re-examine his feelings for Anne. Louisa, due to her delicate condition, is forced to recover at the Harvilles' home in Lyme for months. Captain Benwick, who was a guest as well, helps in Louisa's recovery by attending and reading to her.

Following Louisa's accident, Anne joins her father and sister in Bath, with Lady Russell also in the city. Captain Wentworth visits his older brother Edward in Shropshire. Anne finds that her father and sister are flattered by the attentions of their cousin William Elliot, thinking that if he marries Elizabeth, the family fortunes will be restored. William flatters Anne and offhandedly mentions that he was "fascinated" with the name of his future wife already being an "Elliot" who would rightfully take over for her late mother, but teasingly refuses to tell her who had talked fondly of her to him in the past. Although Anne wants to like William, the attention he pays her and his refined manners, she finds his character opaque and difficult to judge.

Admiral Croft and his wife arrive in Bath with the news that Louisa is engaged to Captain Benwick. Wentworth travels to Bath, where his jealousy is piqued by seeing William courting Anne. Anne visits Mrs Smith, an old school friend, who is now a widow living in Bath under straitened circumstances and in the early days of recovery from serious illness. From her, Anne discovers that she was the person who spoke fondly of Anne to William Elliot. Mrs Smith reveals that beneath William's charming veneer is a cold, calculating opportunist who led Mrs Smith's late husband into debt. He had frequently obtained money from the good-natured but easily manipulated Mr Smith before William's marriage to a very wealthy woman, who has since died. However, when Mr Smith became ill, William made no attempt to aid his friend. Named as the executor to Mr Smith's will before the Smiths learned of his true nature, William has done nothing to help Mrs Smith. She needs someone to act for her in regards to a property of her husband's, which she is too ill to deal with herself and too poor to employ someone to do it for her. She asked William to act for her, but he made it clear he had no intention of doing anything. Although Mrs Smith believes that William is genuinely attracted to Anne, she feels that his initial aim was to prevent Mrs Clay from marrying Sir Walter — rumours abound in Bath that this is Mrs Clay's aim, along with astonishment that Elizabeth does not realise this. A new marriage might mean a son for Sir Walter, displacing William as heir to Kellynch Hall. The discovery that the young lady he had admired in Lyme is his cousin Anne is a wonderful bonus for William.

The Musgroves visit Bath to purchase wedding clothes for Louisa and Henrietta, both soon to marry. Captains Wentworth and Harville encounter them and Anne at the Musgroves' hotel in Bath, where Wentworth overhears Anne and Harville discussing the relative faithfulness of men and women in love. Deeply moved by what Anne says about women not giving up their feelings of love even when all hope is lost, Wentworth writes her a note declaring his feelings for her. Outside the hotel, Anne and Wentworth reconcile, reaffirm their love for each other, and renew their engagement. Lady Russell admits she was wrong about Wentworth and endorses the engagement. William leaves Bath; Mrs Clay soon follows him and becomes his mistress, making it more likely that he will inherit Kellynch Hall as the danger of her marrying Sir Walter has passed. Once Anne and Wentworth have married, he helps Mrs Smith recover her remaining assets. Anne settles into her new life as the wife of a Navy captain.

== Main characters ==
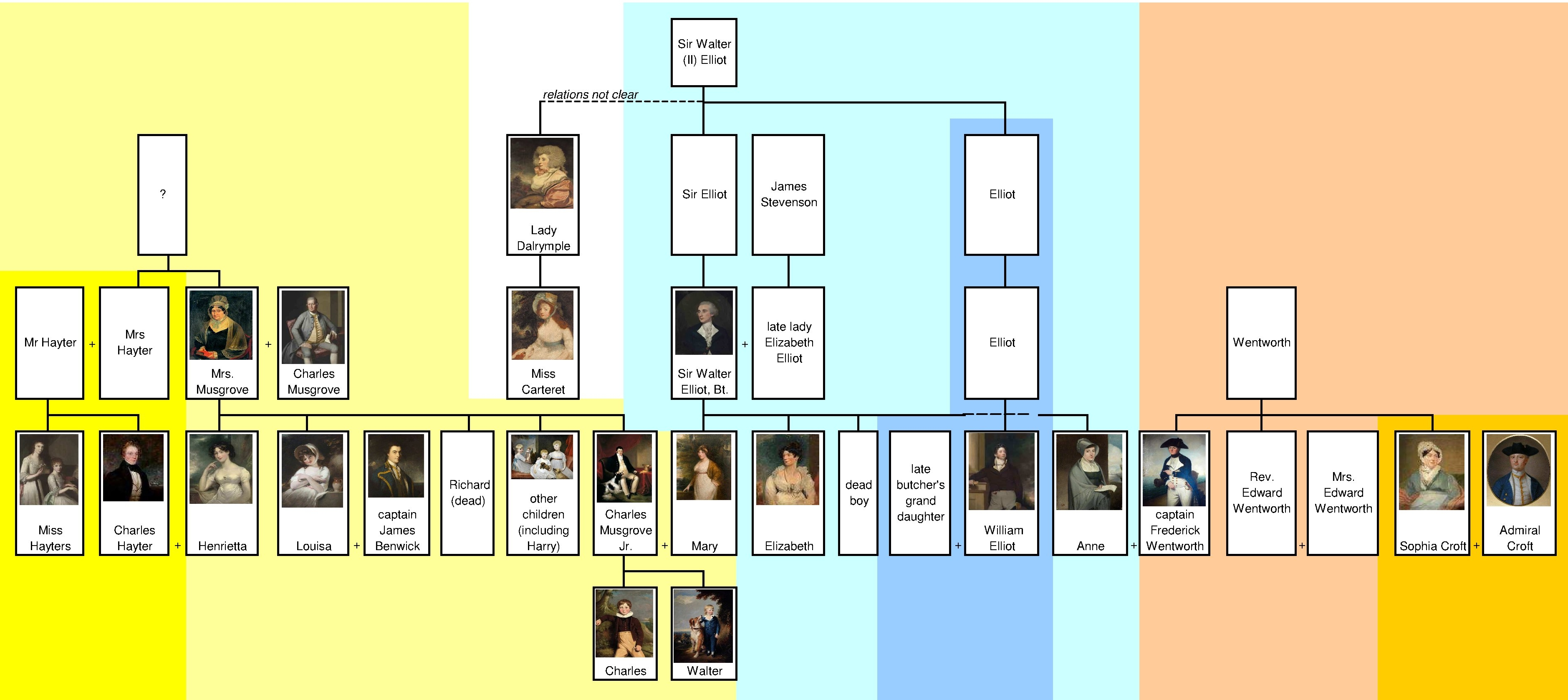
Elliot and Musgrove family trees in Persuasion

Anne Elliot – The second daughter of Sir Walter Elliot. Anne is intelligent, accomplished and attractive, and is unmarried at 27, having broken off seven years earlier her engagement to Frederick Wentworth, then a naval commander. Anne fell in love with Wentworth but was persuaded by her late mother's friend, Lady Russell, to reject his proposal because of his uncertain prospects and lack of money, and Anne's youth. Anne rejects Charles Musgrove's proposal a few years later, knowing she still loves Wentworth, but it is only when Wentworth returns from fighting abroad that she finally confronts her unfulfilled feelings for him.

Captain Frederick Wentworth – A naval officer, about 31 years old, who proposed to Anne some seven years earlier. At the time, he had no fortune and uncertain prospects, but owing to his achievements in the Napoleonic Wars, he advanced in rank and in fortunes. He is one of Sophia Croft's two brothers. He gained his step to post Captain, and gained wealth amounting to about £25,000 from prize money awarded for capturing enemy vessels. He is an eminently eligible bachelor, eager to settle down with a good woman.

Sir Walter Elliot, Bt. – A vain and self-satisfied baronet. Sir Walter is a man whose extravagance since the death of his prudent wife thirteen years before has put his family into dire financial straits, forcing him to lease his estate, Kellynch Hall, to Admiral Croft and rent a more economical residence in Bath. Despite being strongly impressed by wealth and status, he allows Mrs Clay, who is beneath him in social standing, to join his household as a companion to his eldest daughter.

Elizabeth Elliot – The eldest and most beautiful of Sir Walter's three daughters, who appears to be his favourite. Elizabeth encourages her father's imprudent spending and extravagance and like her father, she has a tendency to be narcissistic, while she herself desires marriage after spending most of her life managing the family home in her mother's place. She and her father regard Anne as inconsequential, wanting to ensure only that she marries a man who can enhance the Elliot family's social standing.

Mary Musgrove – The youngest daughter of Sir Walter, married to Charles Musgrove. Mary is attention-seeking, always looking for ways she might have been slighted, and often claims illness when she is upset. She is just as obsessed with social standing and wealth as the rest of her family, and opposes sister-in-law Henrietta's interest in marrying a cousin, Charles Hayter, whom Mary feels is unworthy of being married to a woman of means.

Charles Musgrove Jr. – Son of Charles Musgrove Sr. Husband of Mary and heir to the Musgrove estate. He first proposes to Anne, who refuses as she does not love him. He marries Mary about five years before the story opens, and they have two sons. He is a cheerful man, who loves hunting and endures his wife's faults.

Lady Russell – An intimate friend of the late Lady Elliot and the godmother of Anne, of whom she is particularly fond. She is instrumental in Sir Walter's decision to leave Kellynch Hall and avoid financial ruin. She values social rank and finds in Anne the Elliot daughter most like her late friend, which led her to persuade the young Anne not to marry Wentworth seven years earlier on account of his lack of wealth.

Penelope Clay – A poor widow with children, daughter of Sir Walter's lawyer, and companion of Elizabeth Elliot. She aims to flatter Sir Walter into marriage while her oblivious friend looks on. Later, she abandons the family to become the unmarried mistress of William Elliot.

Admiral Croft – A good-natured, plainspoken tenant at Kellynch Hall and brother-in-law of Captain Wentworth. In his naval career, he was a captain when he married, present at the major Battle of Trafalgar in 1805, then assigned to the East Indies, and now holds the rank of rear admiral of the white.

Sophia Croft – Sister of Captain Wentworth and wife of Admiral Croft for the last fifteen years. She is 38 years old. She offers Anne an example of a strong-minded woman who has married for love instead of money and who has a good life as a naval wife.

Louisa Musgrove – Second sister of Charles Musgrove, aged about 19. Louisa is a high-spirited young woman who has returned with her sister from school. She likes Captain Wentworth and seeks his attention. She is ultimately engaged to Captain Benwick after recovering from her serious fall in Lyme Regis. Her brother Charles notices that she is less lively after suffering the concussion.

Henrietta Musgrove – Eldest sister of Charles Musgrove. Henrietta, aged about 20, is informally engaged to her cousin, Charles Hayter, but is tempted by the more dashing Captain Wentworth. Once Hayter returns home, she again connects with him.

Captain Harville – A friend of Captain Wentworth. Wounded two years previously, he is slightly lame. Wentworth has not seen his friend since the time of that injury, and is eager to reconnect. Harville and his family are settled in nearby Lyme for the winter. His wife tends to Louisa, and the children come to stay with the Musgroves for the Christmas holiday.

Captain James Benwick – A friend of Captains Harville and Wentworth. Benwick was engaged to marry Captain Harville's sister Fanny, but she died while Benwick was at sea. He gained prize money as a lieutenant and was promoted to commander (thus earning the right to be called Captain). Benwick's enjoyment of reading gives him a connection with Anne as does her willingness to listen to him in his time of deep sadness. Benwick was with Louisa Musgrove during her recovery, at the end of which they become engaged to marry.

William Elliot – A distant relation ("great-grandson of the second Sir Walter" when it is not stated from which later holder of the baronetcy Sir Walter descends in order to be the current holder of the title) and the heir presumptive of Sir Walter. It is later revealed that, beneath his charming veneer, Mr Elliot is a cold, calculating opportunist. He became estranged from the family when he married a woman of lower social rank for her fortune and actively insulted his uncle; his relatives cast him aside, until he returned as a wealthy man when they desperately needed money. Despite rumours that he is interested in Elizabeth, he instead turns his attentions towards Anne. He is a widower, eager to claim the social value of the title that he will someday inherit. He also has an interest in Mrs Clay, Elizabeth's companion, and she later becomes his mistress, although this turns out largely to be an attempt by William to stop his uncle from remarrying and potentially producing a son who would inherit Kellynch instead of William.

Mrs Smith – A friend of Anne Elliot who lives in Bath. Mrs Smith is a widow who suffers ill health and financial difficulties. She keeps abreast of the doings of Bath society through news she gets from her nurse, Rooke, who tends the wife of a friend of William Elliot's. Her financial problems could have been straightened out with assistance from William Elliot, her husband's friend and executor of his will, but Elliot was unwilling to exert himself. Wentworth eventually acts on her behalf when William departs Bath, allowing Mrs Smith to claim her money.

Lady Dalrymple – A viscountess, cousin to Sir Walter. She holds a prominent position in society due to her wealth and noble rank. Because their own social status has become precarious, Sir Walter and Elizabeth seek to associate with her and her daughter, Miss Carteret, while staying in Bath to elevate their own standing.

Miss Carteret – Daughter of Lady Dalrymple, who is always in tow behind the viscountess. Considered by Anne and others to be undeserving and very ordinary in intelligence and social graces. Elizabeth, who is more socially motivated, tolerates her company.

== Themes ==
Readers of Persuasion might conclude that Austen intended "persuasion" to be the unifying theme of the story, as the idea of persuasion runs through the book, with vignettes within the story as variations on that theme. British literary scholar Gillian Beer establishes that Austen had profound concerns about the levels and applications of "persuasion" employed in society, especially as it related to the pressures and choices facing the young women of her day. Beer asserts that persuasion was indeed "fraught with moral dangers" for Austen and her contemporary readers; she notes particularly that Austen personally was appalled by what she came to regard as her own misguided advice to her beloved niece Fanny Knight on the very question of whether Fanny ought to accept a particular suitor, even though it would have meant a protracted engagement. Beer writes:

Jane Austen's anxieties about persuasion and responsibility are here passionately expressed. She refuses to become part of the machinery with which Fanny is manoeuvring herself into forming the engagement. To be the stand-in motive for another's actions frightens her. Yet Jane Austen cannot avoid the part of persuader, even as dissuader.

Fanny ultimately rejected her suitor and married someone else after her aunt's death.

Thus, Beer explains, Austen was keenly aware that the human quality of persuasion—to persuade or to be persuaded, rightly or wrongly—is fundamental to the process of human communication, and that, in her novel "Jane Austen gradually draws out the implications of discriminating 'just' and 'unjust' persuasion." Indeed, the narrative winds through a number of situations in which people influence or attempt to influence other people, or themselves. Finally, Beer calls attention to "the novel's entire brooding on the power pressures, the seductions, and also the new pathways opened by persuasion."

== Development of the novel ==
Canadian scholar Sheila Johnson Kindred states that parts of Persuasion were inspired by the career of Austen's brother Charles Austen, a Royal Navy officer, as there are some similarities between the career of the real-life Captain Austen and the fictional Captain Wentworth: both began their careers in command of sloops in the North America station at about the same age; both were popular with their crews; both progressed to the command of frigates; both were keen to share their prize money with their crews, though Captain Wentworth ended up considerably richer as a result of his prize money than did Captain Austen.

Likewise, Captain Austen's wife Fanny, whom he married in Bermuda in 1807, bears some similarities to Mrs Croft, who, like Fanny Austen, lived aboard naval vessels for a time; lived alternatively in Bermuda and Halifax (the two ports that hosted the Royal Navy's North America station); crossed the Atlantic five times, though Mrs Croft was middle-aged in the novel while Fanny Austen was 15 when she married Captain Austen.

Jane Austen liked Fanny Austen, whom she admired for her "unfussiness and gallant good sense." Even after the outbreak of the War of 1812, Fanny Austen was anxious to follow her husband back to the North America station despite the danger of American attacks on Bermuda and Halifax. Jane Austen was impressed with her devotion according to Kindred, seeing Fanny's desire to be with her husband no matter the danger as an attractive trait. Likewise, in Persuasion, Mrs Croft follows her husband everywhere despite the dangers.

Author Andrew Norman has argued that Barrington Court was the inspiration for 'Kellynch Hall.'

== Publication history ==
In a letter to her niece Fanny Knight in March 1817, Austen wrote that she had a novel "which may appear about a twelvemonth hence." John Murray published Persuasion together with Northanger Abbey in a four-volume set, printed in December 1817 but dated 1818. The first advertisement appeared on 17 December 1817. The Austen family retained copyright of the 1,750 copies, which sold rapidly. The later editions of both were published separately.

The book's title is not Jane Austen's but her brother Henry's, who named it after her early death. There is no known source that documents what Austen intended to call her novel. Whatever her intentions might have been, Austen spoke of the novel as The Elliots, according to family tradition, and some critics believe that is probably the title she planned for it.

Henry Austen supplied a "Biographical Notice" of his sister in which her identity was revealed; she was no longer an anonymous author.

== Early drafts and revisions ==
Unlike Sense and Sensibility and Pride and Prejudice, Persuasion was not rewritten from earlier drafts of novels that Austen had originally started before 1800.

American literary historian A Walton Litz has emphasized the special quality of Persuasion among Austen's novels, as it was written over a relatively narrow space of two or three years from start to finish. Almost all of Austen's novels were written in the form of first drafts (now lost) from before 1800, over a decade before their first publication in the last years of Austen's life. Since Persuasion was written over such a narrow time frame, Litz was able to locate and publish Austen's early handwritten drafts as she refined the text of the novel into its final published form. Persuasion is unique among Austen's novels in allowing such a close inspection, as recorded by Litz, of her editorial prowess in revising and enhancing early drafts of her own writing. Litz, citing the research of Norman Page, gives an example of Austen's meticulous editing by excerpting a passage of Austen's cancelled Chapter Ten of the novel and comparing it to the revised version. In its original version, the manuscript stated:

[Wentworth] found that he was considered by his friend Harville an engaged man. The Harvilles entertained not a doubt of a mutual attachment between him and Louisa; and though this to a degree was contradicted instantly, it yet made him feel that perhaps by her family, by everybody, by herself even, the same idea might be held, and that he was not free in honour, though if such were to be the conclusion, too free alas! in heart. He had never thought justly on this subject before, and he had not sufficiently considered that his excessive intimacy at Uppercross must have its danger of ill consequence in many ways; and that while trying whether he could attach himself to either of the girls, he might be exciting unpleasant reports if not raising unrequited regard./ He found too late that he had entangled himself, (cancelled version, as published in Chapman's edition of Austen).

Litz then gives the final version by Austen:

"I found", said he, "that I was considered by Harville an engaged man! That neither Harville nor his wife entertained a doubt of our mutual attachment. I was startled and shocked. To a degree, I could contradict this instantly; but, when I began to reflect that others might have felt the same—her own family, nay, perhaps herself, I was no longer at my own disposal. I was hers in honour if she wished it. I had been unguarded. I had not thought seriously on this subject before. I had not considered that my excessive intimacy must have its danger of ill consequence in many ways; and that I had no right to be trying whether I could attach myself to either of the girls, at the risk of raising even an unpleasant report, were there no other ill effects. I had been grossly wrong, and must abide the consequences"./ He found too late, in short, that he had entangled himself (final version).

To this may be added the surviving version of Austen's handwritten copy of the original draft before the editing process outlined above had even started where Austen wrote it in the following nascent form:

He found that he was considered by his friend Harville, as an engaged Man. The Harvilles entertained not a doubt of a mutual attachment between him & Louisa—and though this to a degree was contradicted instantly—it yet made him feel that perhaps by her family, be everyone, by herself even, the same idea might be held—and that he was not free alas! in Heart.—He had never thought justly on this subject before—he had not sufficiently considered that this excessive Intimacy at Uppercross must have it's (sic?) danger of ill consequence in many ways, and that while trying whether he c-d (sic) attach himself to either of the Girls, he might be exciting unpleasant reports, if not, raising unrequited regard!—He found, too late, that he had entangled himself—."

== Literary significance and criticism ==
In his essay "Persuasion: forms of estrangement", A Walton Litz summarises the issues critics have raised with Persuasion as a novel:

Persuasion has received highly intelligent criticism in recent years, after a long period of comparative neglect, and the lines of investigation have followed Virginia Woolf's suggestive comments. Critics have been concerned with the "personal" quality of the novel and the problems it poses for biographical interpretation; with the obvious unevenness in narrative structure; with the "poetic" use of landscape, and the hovering influence of Romantic poetry; with the pervasive presence of Anne Elliot's consciousness; with new effects in style and syntax; with the "modernity" of Anne Elliot, an isolated personality in a rapidly changing society.

In her 1980 book on Austen, Susan Morgan challenges Litz on calling Persuasion a novel showing Austen's assimilation of the new romantic poetry. Morgan notes Litz's comment on "the deeply physical impact of Persuasion"; he remarks that "Mansfield Park is about the loss and return of principles, Emma about the loss and return of reason, Persuasion about the loss and return of 'bloom'." According to Morgan, Litz "acknowledges the crudeness of these formulations, and we recognize that he is attempting to discuss a quality of the novel that is hard to describe. But such summaries, even tentatively offered, only distort. The few brief nature scenes in Persuasion (and they are brief, out of all proportion to the commentary on them), the walk to Winthrop and the environs of Pinny and Lyme, are certainly described with sensibility and appreciation. And in Anne's mind they are just as certainly bound up with 'the sweets of poetical despondence'."

Persuasion is the first of Austen's novels to feature as the central character a woman who, by the standards of the time, is past the first bloom of youth. British literary critic Robert P Irvine writes that Persuasion "is in many ways a radical departure" from Austen's earlier novels. Austen biographer Claire Tomalin characterizes the book as Austen's "present to herself, to Miss Sharp, to Cassandra, to Martha Lloyd...to all women who had lost their chance in life and would never enjoy a second spring."

A recurring debate in 18th-century Britain concerned the power of books over women: were women more susceptible to the power of reading than men, and if so, was reading a benign or malign influence on them? Austen first addressed this question in Northanger Abbey, in which reading Gothic books has comic effects for Catherine Morland, and also gives her a more acute sense of reality and people. The American scholar Adela Pinch writes that Austen returns to this theme in Persuasion but in a more mature and probing manner, as Persuasion is concerned with "what it feels like to be a reader. It does so by connecting this feeling to what the presence of other people feel like. It explores, that is, the influence reading can have on one's mind by comparing it to the influence of one person's mind over another's."

Pinch writes that Persuasion has been called the most lyrical of Austen's novels; "Its emphasis on memory and subjectivity has been called Wordsworthian, its emotional tone has been likened to Shelley and Keats, and its epistemological strategies compared to Coleridge's conversation poems. Its modernity has been hinted through allusions to the lyric fiction of Virginia Woolf."

Pinch also writes that Austen is more concerned with spatial matters as various families, especially the Musgroves, are portrayed in terms of the amount of space they take up and noise they generate. For example, Captain Wentworth and Elliot are prevented from embracing by grossly obese Mrs Musgrove, and Sir Walter comments after seeing some Royal Navy sailors that they are "fit not to be seen"; Austen notes how people look and the brain registers visual information. Pinch describes Persuasion as a novel of "repetitions, of things happening within a strong context of memory." Anne is often lost in her own world of thought, and throughout the book the phrase "Anne found herself" recurs. During her walk at Winthrop on a November day, Anne ruminates on various aspects of her life and the books she has read, and Austen seems to suggest that reading is insufficient consolation for a woman's pain, but also unavoidable if one wishes for her comfort.

The literary scholar Stuart Tave, in his essay on Anne Elliot, notes the melancholy qualities of her reality after she turns down Captain Wentworth's original proposal of marriage. For Tave, Austen portrays Anne as a character with many admirable traits, usually exceeding the characters who surround her in these traits. Tave singles out Austen's portrayal of Anne at the end of the novel in her conversation with Captain Harville, when they discuss the relative virtues of gender and their advantages compared to one another; Tave sees Anne as displaying remarkable intelligence. Tave quotes from Virginia Woolf's A Room of One's Own: "It was strange to think that all the great women of fiction were, until Jane Austen's day, not only seen by the other sex, but seen only in relation to the other sex." Tave applies Woolf's insight to Persuasion, writing: "All histories are against you, Captain Harville says to Anne in their disagreement about man's nature and woman's nature, 'all stories, prose and verse.' He could bring fifty quotations in a moment to his side of the argument, from books, songs, proverbs. But they were all written by men. 'Men have had every advantage of us in telling their own story,' as Anne says. Persuasion is the story told by a woman."

In her book on Austen, the critic Julia Prewitt Brown finds significance in comparing Persuasion to Emma with regard to Austen's ability to vary her narrative technique. Brown writes:

The coolness to the reader (conveyed by Austen's narrative) contrasts with an intensity of feeling for the characters in the story, particularly for the heroine. The reason for this contradiction is that Anne Elliot is the central intelligence of the novel. Sir Walter is seen as Anne sees him, with resigned contempt. For the first time Jane Austen gives over the narrator's authority to a character almost completely, In Emma, many events and situations are seen from Emma's point of view, but the central intelligence lies somewhere between the narrator and the reader, who together see that Emma sees wrongly. In Persuasion, Anne Elliot's feelings and evaluations correspond to those of the narrator in almost every situation, although there are several significant lapses...It seems that this transfer of authority placed a strain on Jane Austen's accustomed narrative tendencies and that she could not maintain it completely.

Robert Irvine writes that, unlike other Austen heroes, who are either part of the gentry, the aristocracy or the Church of England, Wentworth is a self-made man who has become rich via prize money allowed to those who served in the Royal Navy. Sir Walter disparages naval officers like Wentworth and Croft because they "spoil" their complexions outside on the sea and have risen "too quickly" in social status. But Sir Walter is portrayed as financially incompetent, having squandered his inherited wealth, whereas Wentworth uses his prize money wisely. Sir Walter's dismissal of the navy men who played such a prominent role in defeating Napoleon is considered unpatriotic and ungrateful. According to the scholar Gary Kelly, Sir Walter is a stand-in for the notoriously spendthrift and snobbish Prince Regent George—of whom Austen deeply disapproved—who was infamous for his womanizing, gambling, drinking, and inability to pay his colossal debts. At the time, there was a widespread belief that Britain defeated France despite the Prince Regent rather than because of him, and Kelly states that a character like Sir Walter—who did nothing to defeat Napoleon—attacking someone like Wentworth was Austen's way of expressing her frustration at the Prince Regent taking credit for defeating Napoleon.

Anne and Wentworth, once married, do not become part of the land-owning gentry; Austen writes that the two were destined for "settled life." According to Irvine, the sailors in Persuasion are the "most subversive characters" in all of Austen's books, as they possess "national importance" only by the virtue of their role in defeating Napoleon and do not own land or ask for social recognition from the gentry. The Royal Navy in Persuasion is a meritocracy where one rises up via one's talents, not via birth and land, which makes Persuasion the most radical of all of Austen's novels, according to Irvine.

Irvine notes that the gentry characters in Persuasion are an "unimpressive lot." Sir Walter is portrayed as a vain, pompous, and incapable of providing love for his children, while the Musgroves lack class and elegance. John Wiltshire writes that Sir Walter obsessively reads books relating only to the baronetage, and the Musgroves are relentlessly philistine in their tastes. Admiral and Mrs Croft do not plan to buy an estate, being content to rent Kellynch Hall, and are described as taking better care of the estate than Sir Walter, whose family has owned Kellynch Hall for three generations. Wiltshire considers that the Musgroves' and Sir Walter's narrowness of vision and taste highlight the heightened state of Anne's consciousnesses.

Charles Musgrove, though friendly and respectable, is portrayed as unsuitable for Anne as his only interests are guns, hunting, dogs and horses. Irvine notes that in British fiction at the time, it was a normal plot device for women—who were portrayed as more sensitive and poetical than men—to improve someone like Charles by showing him that there is more to life than hunting, but Anne rejects this role, and the narrator suggests that she was right to do so. The marriage of Anne's parents is presented as such a match, with Anne's mother attempting to "improve" Sir Walter, and her life becoming thoroughly miserable as a result. But the possibility of such a marriage seems to exist for Captain Benwick and Louisa Musgrove, as the narrator notes, "he would gain cheerfulness and she would learn to be an enthusiast for Scott and Lord Byron." According to Irvine, Benwick and Anne are similar characters, who have a profound sense of loss. Anne's heart still belongs to Wentworth, but Benwick is described as "younger in feelings, if not in fact; younger as a man. He will rally again, and be happy with another".

Irvine writes of the differences between the Elliot sisters and Austen's other sibling relationships. In contrast to the Dashwood sisters (Sense and Sensibility) and the Bennet sisters (Pride and Prejudice), Anne is not close to her sisters.

Lady Russell persuades Anne to reject Wentworth's first offer of marriage. Lady Russell never expresses any guilt about breaking up Anne's relationship with Wentworth: "her heart revelled in angry pleasure, in pleased contempt." in reference to Lady Russell's reflection that Wentworth, who had once seemed to appreciate Anne's superior qualities, now appeared to be attracted to Louisa Musgrove, who, although pleasant, is vastly inferior to Anne in character.

John Wiltshire notes that Wentworth is a man of action as opposed to words, which makes Anne the novel's only self-reflective character. Anne becomes steadily more assertive, telling Mr Elliot at one point, "My idea of good company, Mr Elliot, is the company of clever, well-informed people, who have a great deal of conversation; that is what I call good company."

Irvine writes that, unlike in Austen's other novels, a "non-event" at the beginning of Persuasion—Anne does not marry Wentworth—shapes the rest of the plot, as the hero and heroine defeat the consequences of their shared history. Irvine also says that Persuasion's plot depends upon the main characters remaining the same, and the need for the characters to remain true to themselves, to cherish the memory of the ones they love, is emphasized by the signs of social decay around Anne; the gentry characters neglect their estates and treat the values they are supposed to uphold. Anne's love for Wentworth is the only fixed point in an otherwise fluid world.

For Irvine, Persuasion's key moments come when a third party overhears somebody else's conversation, whereas conversation is a means for members of the elite to confirm their membership of a common group in Austen's other novels. Louisa Musgrove discusses Admiral Croft's carriage driving with Wentworth, which leads her to say, "If I loved a man, as she loves the Admiral, I would be always with him, nothing should ever separate us, and I would rather be overturned by him, than driven safely by anybody else." According to Irvine, overhearing this conversation brings back Anne's memories of her love for Wentworth and brings her sorrow as she fears that he is falling in love with Louisa. Another overheard conversation occurs during the novel's climax, when Anne debates with Captain Harville the respective capacity for faithfulness of men and women, which Wentworth overhears. Not realising that Wentworth is listening, Anne says, "All the privilege I claim for my own sex (it is not a very enviable one, you need not covet it) is that of loving longest, when existence or when hope is gone." The narrator notes that, after saying this, "She [Anne] could not immediately have uttered another sentence; her heart was too full, her breath too much oppressed." As Wentworth fears a second rejection by Anne, John Wiltshire, known for his work on psychoanalysis and literature, feels that much of the novel is concerned with incidents that bring the two together and relies upon relating Anne's psychological state as she comes close to the man who once proposed marriage to her, making it more of a psychological study.

In the introduction to the Penguin Classics edition, Persuasion is called a great Cinderella story. It features a heroine who is generally unappreciated and to some degree exploited by those around her; a handsome prince who appears on the scene but seems more interested in the "more obvious" charms of others; a moment of realisation; and a happy ending. It has been said that it is not that Anne is unloved, but rather that those around her no longer see her clearly: she is such a fixed part of their lives that her likes and dislikes, wishes and dreams, are no longer considered, even by those who claim to value her, like Lady Russell.

== Adaptations ==
=== Film ===
- 1995: Persuasion, released in the United Kingdom as a made-for-television film starring Amanda Root as Anne and Ciarán Hinds as Captain Wentworth. This was released as a theatrical film in United States movie theatres by Sony Pictures Classics.
- 2007: Persuasion, television film using Bath locations shot in September 2006 for ITV1, with Sally Hawkins as Anne, Rupert Penry-Jones as Captain Wentworth.
- 2020: Modern Persuasion, a film modernisation and retelling of Persuasion, for Hulu, starring Alicia Witt and directed by Alex Appel.
- 2022: Persuasion, a Netflix film starring Dakota Johnson as Anne and Cosmo Jarvis as Captain Wentworth.

=== Digital Media ===
- 2015: Classic Alice, a digital series adaptation starring Kate Hackett as an interpretation of Anne.

=== Television ===
- 1960: Persuasion, BBC miniseries starring Daphne Slater as Anne and Paul Daneman as Captain Wentworth.
- 1971: Persuasion, ITV miniseries starring Ann Firbank as Anne and Bryan Marshall as Captain Wentworth.
- 1972: Persuasión, a ten-part Spanish miniseries by TVE starring Maite Blasco as Ana (Anne) and Juan Diego as Michael Trent (Captain Wentworth).
- 2012: Moon Embracing the Sun, is a K-drama that loosely adapts the plot of Persuasion, setting it in a royal court during Korea's Joseon period. In this version, the lovers are the king and the princess Yeon Woo, who loses her memory and returns as a shaman eight years later.
- 2019: Rational Creatures, a web series modernization of Persuasion, with Kristina Pupo as Ana Elías (Anne Elliot) and Peter Giessl as Fred Wentworth (Captain Wentworth), created by Ayelen Barrios, Hazel Jeffs, Jessamyn Leigh, and Anya Steiner.
- 2025: Monica Dolan reads Persuasion in series 4 of BBC4's "The Read".

=== Theatre ===
- 2010: Persuasion, a musical drama adapted from the novel by Barbara Landis, using music from the period selected from Austen's own writings. It was performed by Chamber Opera Chicago first in 2011, again in 2013, and subsequently performed by the same company in New York as well as several cities in the United Kingdom in 2013–2015.
- 2011: An adaptation for the stage of Persuasion by Tim Luscombe was produced by Salisbury Playhouse (Repertory Theatre) in 2011. In 2019, this adaptation was staged by the Genesian Theatre.
- 2012: Persuasion, adapted for the theatre by Jon Jory, world-premiere at Onstage Playhouse in Chula Vista, California.
- 2015: Reading of Persuasion at 5th Avenue Theatre's Festival of New Musicals.
- 2017: Persuasion, a musical adaptation by Harold Taw and Chris Jeffries. World-premiere production at Taproot Theatre Company.
- 2017: Persuasion, directed by Jeff James, who adapted it with James Yeatman, ran at the Royal Exchange Theatre in Manchester in May and June. This adaptation ran at Alexandra Palace Theatre in April 2022.
- 2018: Persuasion: a new play by Sarah Rose Kearns, adapted from the novel by Jane Austen; in development 2016–2018 with assistance from the HB Playwrights Foundation and the Jane Austen Society of North America New York Metropolitan Region.

=== Radio ===
- 1986: BBC Radio 4 dramatised full-cast adaptation in three parts with Juliet Stevenson as Anne and Tim Brierley as Captain Wentworth.

=== Literature using themes or characters of the novel ===
- Beckford, Grania (1981), Virtues and Vices: A Delectable Rondelet of Love and Lust in Edwardian Times, St. Martin's Press, ISBN 978-0312849542
- Dev, Sonali (2020), Recipe for Persuasion, Rajes, HarperCollins, ISBN 978-0-06-283907-7
- Peterfreund, Diana (2013), For Darkness Shows the Stars, Balzer + Bray
- Edwards, Melodie (2024), Once Persuaded, Twice Shy, Berkley Romance, ISBN 978-0-59344-079-7
- Bellezza, Audrey; Harding, Emily (2025), Anne of Avenue A (For the Love of Austen #3), Gallery Books, ISBN 978-1-66809-765-6

== Bibliography ==
- Gilson, David (1986). Grey, J David (ed.). Editions and Publishing History. New York: Macmillan. ISBN 978-0-025-45540-5.
- Irvine, Robert P (2005). Jane Austen. London: Routledge. ISBN 978-0-415-31434-3.
- Kelly, Gary (1997). "Religion and Politics". In Copeland, Edward; McMaster, Juliet (eds.). The Cambridge Companion to Jane Austen. Cambridge: Cambridge University Press. ISBN 978-0-521-49517-2.
- Kindred, Sheila Johnson (June 2009). "The Influence of Naval Captain Charles Austen's North American Experiences on Persuasion and Mansfield Park". Persuasions: The Jane Austen Journal (31): 115–129. S2CID 141868499.
- LeFaye, Deirdre (2003). Jane Austen: The World of Her Novels. London: Francis Lincoln. ISBN 978-0-7112-2278-6.
- Parrill, Sue (11 April 2002). Jane Austen on Film and Television: A Critical Study of the Adaptations. McFarland. ISBN 978-0-7864-1349-2.
- Pinch, Adela (Spring 1993). "Lost in a Book: Jane Austen's "Persuasion". Studies in Romanticism. 32 (1): 97–117. doi:10.2307/25600997. JSTOR 25600997. S2CID 171375241.
- Tomalin, Claire (1997). Jane Austen: A Life. New York: Alfred A Knopf. ISBN 978-0-679-44628-6.
- Wiltshire, John (1997). "Mansfield Park, Emma, Persuasion". In Copeland, Edward; McMaster, Juliet (eds.). The Cambridge Companion to Jane Austen. Cambridge: Cambridge University Press. ISBN 978-0-521-49517-2.
- "John Wiltshire". Annual General Meeting. Boston: Jane Austen Society of North America. October 2000.
