= Fiona Finlay (producer) =

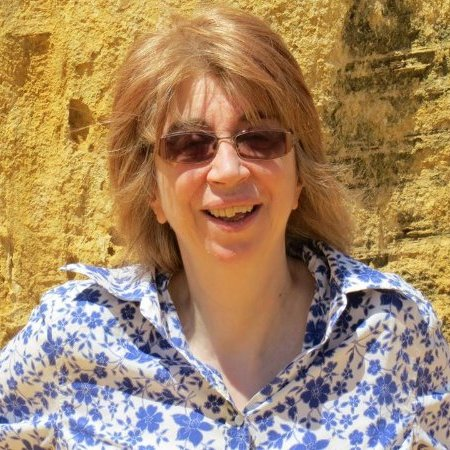
- Fiona Finlay
- Born: 1956 (age 69–70); London, England
- Occupations: Producer, Writer

Fiona Finlay (born 1956 in London) is an English TV /film producer and writer. She received a BAFTA (1995) for her TV production of Jane Austen's Persuasion and the Documentaries Special Prize at the Prix Italia 1994 and the 1st Mental Health in the Media Award for Black Daisies for the Bride, a television film written by international poet Tony Harrison about Alzheimer's disease.

== Education and career ==
Finlay graduated with a degree in English literature from the University of Leicester and gained a postgraduate diploma in theatre studies from the University of Cardiff. She was awarded a Distinction in the Certificate of Higher Education in Arts Management from Birkbeck College, University of London. She started her career in theatre as assistant director at the Haymarket Theatre, Leicester after a postgraduate diploma at the Sherman Theatre, University of Cardiff, and took part in the Independent Regional Theatre Director's Scheme at the Gateway Theatre, Chester. Following work as assistant to the heads of New Writing and Classical Repertoire at the National Theatre she joined the BBC as a script editor and later moved to being a producer. In 2013 after a period of time working in the charity sector, film and television consultancy work and writing detective novels, Finlay launched the company Doorway Films to focus on drama, comedy and films.

== Works ==
Productions include:

- Happy Christmas I Love You (1989) by Carla Lane
- Single Voices (1990) including monologues by Barry Humphries, Roy Clarke, Sheila Hancock and Carla Lane
- Downtown Lagos (1992) by Leigh Jackson
- The Sharp End (1991) by Roy Clarke
- Black Daisies for the Bride (1993) by Tony Harrison
- the multi award-winning Persuasion (1995) directed by Roger Michell and adapted from Jane Austen by Nick Dear. In addition to Best Television Drama, Persuasion won BAFTAs for Best Music, Best Design, Best Costume and Best Photography. It was released by Sony Classics in the cinemas.
- After Miss Julie (1995) by Patrick Marber
- Broken Glass (1996) by Arthur Miller
- Danny’s Story – A life of Ecstasy (1997) by Paula Milne
- The American (1998) adapted from Henry James by Michael Hastings

== Work for disability access ==
Finlay has been a longstanding advocate for disability access and widening participation and has worked long-term with adults with learning disabilities. She was a Trustee of the Poetry School (2010–2012) advising on disability and has worked with Martin Pollecoff on developing the Long Boat Home, an organisation for ex servicemen and women seeking therapy. There is a strand of Doorway Films in which in conjunction with her co director Dr Jane Simmonds, Finlay is developing medical films to help patients manage their conditions.
