= Persuasion (1995 film) =

Television film by Roger Michell

- Cover of the 1995 British VHS release
- Based on: Persuasion by Jane Austen
- Screenplay by: Nick Dear
- Directed by: Roger Michell
- Starring: Amanda Root; Ciarán Hinds
- Music by: Jeremy Sams
- Countries of origin: United Kingdom; United States
- Original language: English

Production
- Producer: Fiona Finlay
- Cinematography: John Daly
- Editor: Kate Evans
- Running time: 104 minutes
- Production companies: BBC; WGBH Boston; Millésime Productions
- Budget: £1 million

Original release
- Network: BBC Two
- Release: 16 April 1995
- Network: PBS
- Release: 6 April 1997

Persuasion is a 1995 period drama film directed by Roger Michell and based on Jane Austen's 1817 novel of the same name. In her theatrical film debut, Amanda Root stars as protagonist Anne Elliot, while Ciarán Hinds plays her romantic interest, Captain Frederick Wentworth. The film is set in early 19th-century England, eight years after Anne was persuaded by others to reject Wentworth's proposal of marriage. Persuasion follows the two as they become reacquainted with each other while supporting characters threaten to interfere.

The novel was adapted by Nick Dear, who considered the story more mature than Austen's other novels, characterising it as one of realism and truthfulness, particularly in telling the story of two people separated and then reunited. As Austen's style conveys Anne's thoughts internally, Dear and Root felt compelled to express the character's emotions using less dialogue. Director Roger Michell avoided what he felt was the polished, artificial feel of other 19th-century depictions, and discouraged his actors from wearing make-up or appearing too hygienic. Costume designer Alexandra Byrne produced clothing that appeared "lived-in", which won her a BAFTA. Persuasion was shot in chronological order, allowing Root to portray more easily Anne's development from being downtrodden to happy and blossoming. It was filmed during a period of popularity for Austen's works.

Originally the BBC was the sole production company of Persuasion until it partnered with the American WGBH Boston and the French Millesime. This gave the production a larger budget and allowed it to be filmed at locations featured in the novel, including Lyme Regis and Bath. Persuasion aired on 16 April 1995 on BBC Two. Sony Pictures Classics released the film in American cinemas on 27 September 1995, as Austen's increasing popularity became apparent to Hollywood. Persuasion's cinematic release attracted the attention of film critics, and it received generally positive reviews, with many praising Root's performance. Film scholars have observed significant changes from the source material, as well as class and gender themes.

== Plot ==
Admiral Croft arrives via naval ship, while a horse and buggy carries Mr Shepherd and his widowed daughter Mrs Clay to Kellynch Hall. Creditors accost them over the debts owed by the residence's owner, Sir Walter Elliot, while Croft discusses the end of the Napoleonic Wars with fellow Royal Navy officers.

Facing financial ruin, vain baronet Sir Walter is forced to retrench. Though resistant, he eventually agrees to temporarily move to Bath while the hall is let. Shepherd, the Elliots' friend and neighbour Lady Russell, and Sir Walter's middle child Anne propose the idea.

Anne is upset the new Kellynch Hall tenant is Admiral Croft, whose brother-in-law is naval captain Frederick Wentworth. Nine years earlier, Lady Russell persuaded Anne to decline his marriage proposal due to his lack of prospects. Now wealthy from serving in the Wars, Wentworth has returned to England, presumably seeking a wife.

Later, Anne laments her family's financial predicament and her past rejection of the captain's proposal to Lady Russell. As the Elliots head to Bath, Anne stays behind for her hypochondriacal sister Mary, who married into an influential farming family living at the Uppercross estate. There, each of the Musgroves complain to her: Mary's husband Charles, sisters-in-law Louisa and Henrietta, and her parents-in-law.

Captain Wentworth dines with the Musgroves, so Anne volunteers to nurse Mary's injured son to avoid going. At breakfast, Wentworth briefly visits her and Mary, the first time he and Anne have met since her rejection. Anne later is told Wentworth thought her unrecognisable

Wentworth, his sister and his brother-in-law become regular guests at Uppercross. He is relaxed and charming, but avoids direct contact with Anne. Louisa and Henrietta openly flirt with Wentworth, unaware of his and Anne's history. This upsets Henrietta's suitor, Henry Hayter.

During a walk to his hometown Winthrop, the couple reconnects and Anne overhears Wentworth praising Louisa's strength of will. He learns of Anne's rejection of Charles' proposal, apparently once again thanks to Lady Russell. So Charles wed Mary.

Anne, Wentworth, and the younger Musgroves visit Wentworth's naval friends, Captains Harville and Benwick in Lyme. Benwick, whose fiancée Phoebe Harville died recently, is mourning deeply, but finds solace in poetry. Anne cheers him somewhat by talking to him, although she is concerned about his deep depression.

On their last day, a handsome stranger crosses their path, noticing Anne. They later discover he is William Elliot, her estranged cousin and heir to Kellynch Hall. During a final walk along the shore, Louisa jumps from a high stone staircase expecting Wentworth to catch her, suffering a serious head injury. Anne takes charge during the chaos. Louisa is taken to the Harvilles' to await a surgeon.

Although Wentworth wishes Anne stay to nurse Louisa, both yield to Mary's protest. The captain takes Henrietta and Anne to Uppercross to break the news before returning to Lyme. Anne leaves for Bath after learning Louisa is healing.

Anne's family welcome her coolly. Sir Walter and eldest daughter Elizabeth reveal they have made amends with Mr Elliot. Lady Russell is pleased when Mr. Elliot begins pursuing Anne, who is unconvinced of his sincerity. She is thrilled to discover the Crofts have arrived. The Admiral brings surprising news: Louisa is recovered and engaged to Captain Benwick.

Wentworth arrives in Bath and encounters Anne repeatedly. Though their conversations are brief, and usually interrupted, she suspects his feelings are returning. The Musgroves and Harville arrive to buy the sisters bridal attire, bringing the pair together more often. While Anne struggles with how to communicate her continuing attachment to the captain, everyone expects her to wed Mr Elliot.

Visiting her old friend Mrs. Smith, Anne discovers Mr. Elliot is bankrupt and wants to marry her to ensure his inheritance. Anne also learns he is scheming to prevent the baronet from marrying Mrs Clay and producing a male heir.

During a morning at the Musgroves', Anne and Captain Harville discuss the constancy of love. Wentworth, writing nearby, overhears them. Before leaving, he leaves a note for Anne, which declares he has never stopped loving her and once again proposes.

Anne quickly finds him outside. That night at a party, Wentworth arrives to announce Anne has accepted his proposal, much to Mr. Elliot's consternation. Later, Wentworth and Anne, now married, are seen aboard a navy warship, happy together.

== Cast ==
- Amanda Root as Anne Elliot
- Ciarán Hinds as Captain Frederick Wentworth
- Susan Fleetwood as Lady Russell
- Corin Redgrave as Sir Walter Elliot
- Fiona Shaw as Mrs. Croft
- John Woodvine as Admiral Croft
- Phoebe Nicholls as Elizabeth Elliot
- Samuel West as Mr. Elliot
- Sophie Thompson as Mary Musgrove
- Judy Cornwell as Mrs. Musgrove
- Simon Russell Beale as Charles Musgrove
- Felicity Dean as Mrs. Clay
- Roger Hammond as Mr. Musgrove
- Emma Roberts as Louisa Musgrove
- Victoria Hamilton as Henrietta Musgrove
- Robert Glenister as Captain Harville
- Richard McCabe as Captain Benwick
- Helen Schlesinger as Mrs. Smith
- Jane Wood as Nurse Rooke
- David Collings as Mr. Shepherd
- Darlene Johnson as Lady Dalrymple
- Ken Shorter as Lady Dalrymple's Butler
- Cinnamon Faye as Miss Carteret
- Isaac Maxwell-Hunt as Henry Hayter
- Roger Llewellyn as Sir Henry Willoughby
- Sally George as Mrs. Harville
- Rosa Mannion as the concert singer

== Production ==
=== Conception and adaptation ===
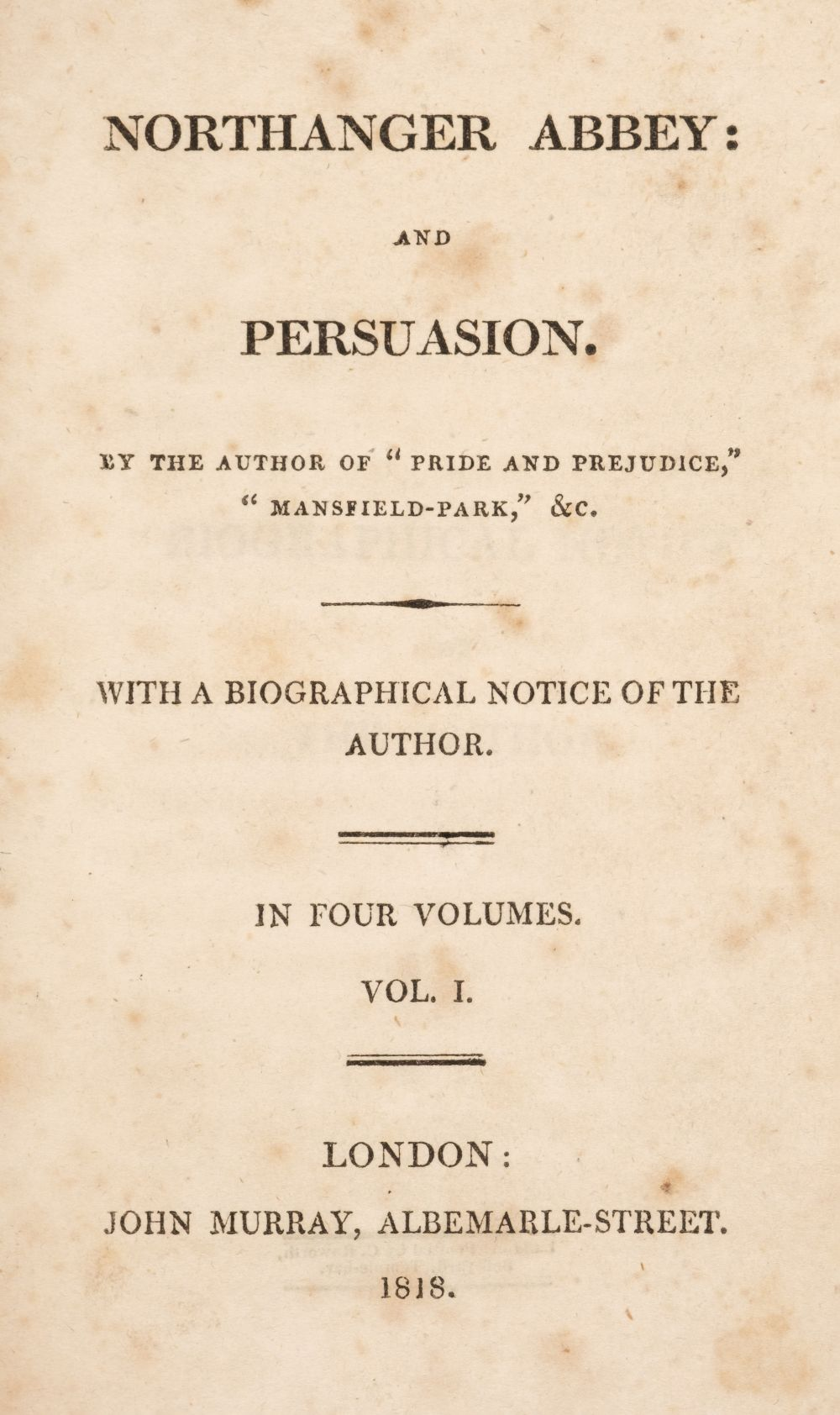
Original cover of Persuasion

The filming of Persuasion coincided with a sudden resurgence of Jane Austen adaptations, as it was one of six such productions released during the mid-1990s. The media dubbed the phenomenon "Austenmania". While it was common for a successful adaptation to lead to the production of others, this surge in Austen's popularity involved many simultaneous projects—Persuasion's production, for instance, coincided with the TV serial Pride and Prejudice and the feature film Sense and Sensibility. Despite the surge, film scholar Andrew Higson and others argue that there is little evidence that the various producers—who were employed by different companies—communicated when conceiving their adaptations.

The idea for a film version of the 1817 Austen novel Persuasion began with the English producer Fiona Finlay, who had wanted to create an adaptation for several years. The novel had last been adapted by ITV in a 1971 serial starring Ann Firbank. Finlay felt that the "very romantic" story was one "everyone can relate to. There's something very touching about long-lost love". She approached the writer Nick Dear about adapting it for television; Finlay had enjoyed his contributions to theatre, particularly his play about William Hogarth, The Art of Success. Dear first suggested they try one of Austen's other works—either Sense and Sensibility or Pride and Prejudice—but agreed to adapt Persuasion after reading it. Dear considered the novel—the author's last completed work—a more mature story than the others.

Dear later wrote that Persuasion was superficially "a love story in the Cinderella mould" but it was also one of "realism and truthfulness", particularly in telling the story of two people separated and then reunited. He spent two years working on a script, and found this task difficult for several reasons. First, he needed to find a structure that would be faithful to the novel. Second, his protagonist barely spoke for the first half, and "therefore can't motor the action along as a central character conventionally does". Adapting Austen's wit was another challenge; much could not be used "because it's almost all in the author's voice telling us about characters, with a certain wit or lightness that came from the characters themselves. It's a craft job, interpreting the novel for oneself and then finding a film language for it".

An experienced theatre and television serial director, Roger Michell was chosen to direct Persuasion, in what was to be his first feature film. As a young child, Michell had been an admirer of Austen's, which set him apart from his male classmates. "I was the only boy in my class who took Austen as a special paper", he said. His attraction to Persuasion was based on his belief that it was Austen's most emotional and poignant novel, as well as her most autobiographical. He described the work as an "erotic love story which is full of sexual yearning". While directing, Michell sought to emphasise contrasts in Austen's story, seen for instance between "the chilly formality of Kellynch Hall and the warm, wet feel of Uppercross". The Royal Navy was another point of interest, as officers like Wentworth would often have returned to society wealthy and full of stories. The director wished to depict the integration of cultures, as naval officers came back with "an informality of behaviour and language which was in marked contrast to what was there before".

=== Casting ===
"Anne has been devoting her life as a spinster to being useful to others. That effort to put her disappointment aside is what makes her seem 'faded.' She's been trying not to confront her burden of sorrow".

— Actress Amanda Root on her character

Root made her theatrical film debut playing Anne Elliot, the film's protagonist. According to Root, "every actress in England" read for the part. Having worked with the director previously on the 1993 TV serial The Buddha of Suburbia, Root won the role by writing him a letter to gain an audition. The character was described to Root as "haggard", which attracted the actress. "I relish a job like this, starting off downtrodden and gradually blossoming", she said. WGBH Boston, the American company co-producing the film, had wanted a better-known actress for the part but agreed to Root's casting after seeing Root's screen test.

Root came to realise that while the novel's narrative style allowed Anne's thoughts to come through, the film adaptation offered comparatively little dialogue. As a result, she "had to cover pages and pages of the story without uttering anything, much of the time. I couldn't even think about technique, I just had to keep looking at the [novel] and then somehow radiate the feelings". Persuasion was shot in chronological order, which allowed Root to see "what a difference [her character's] sense of unhappiness can create", as by the end of the film Anne is "happier and looks better". Root considered the role to be much quieter than her experiences working with the Royal Shakespeare Company, which included her portrayal of Lady Macbeth. The Irish actor Ciarán Hinds, who depicted Frederick Wentworth, commented that Austen "understands a man's heart and how delicate it can be sometimes". He also appreciated that, though Wentworth was a "competent leader of men in his profession", he was "socially inept" in Anne's presence. Susan Fleetwood, the actress who played Lady Russell, had also worked with Michell on The Buddha of Suburbia. She died soon after filming; Persuasion was her last film role.

=== Make-up and costume design ===
Michell sought to avoid giving his film a polished, artificial feel, instead opting for realistic costumes and make-up (Hinds and Root pictured).

Michell attempted to be as faithful to the novel as possible, in particular avoiding what he felt was the polished, artificial feel of other period dramas set in the 19th century. The director explained, "I was desperately trying to make it feel like it could be happening in the next room. I tried to make it something which is absolutely about real people and not about dressing or hairstyles or carpet". Consequently, because he felt the realistic look of the age would make the film more dramatic, Michell chose to depict the actors without make-up and stopped them looking too hygienic. Root commented about the film's natural look in an interview, "I basically didn't wear any makeup [in the film], and my hair was obviously set in a very unflattering way... I suppose the lighting was quite harsh, as well. None of us looked good". She said in a separate interview, "I wanted to make Anne Elliot a somewhat plain woman who was not really miserable but had found a way to be content somehow, and yet emotions are buzzing around her all the time". Root believed the film's realistic depiction of the age was a key aspect of its appeal.

The film's costume design was overseen by Alexandra Byrne, who created clothing that appeared "lived-in" and "realistic". Like Fleetwood, Byrne had also worked with Michell on The Buddha of Suburbia. It was her first time designing period costumes for film. During shooting, the crew often had to compete for costumes and props with the BBC production Pride and Prejudice, which was being filmed at the same time. Persuasion's crew consequently had to send for replacement items from Italy and Australia. For her work in the film, Byrne won a BAFTA for Best Costume Design.

Louise Watson, writing for Screenonline, felt the film's costume and make-up help "convey the full Cinderella transformation of Austen's heroine. At first the undervalued family martyr, Anne is the wallflower who has lost her 'bloom'. Her loose-fitting costumes hint at how she has pined away since refusing Wentworth... As she regains her confidence, she blossoms; she dresses becomingly, her eyes sparkle and her features become animated". Paulette Richards argues that the film's "unreliable" male characters, such as Sir Walter, are identified as such by the flamboyant nature of their clothing. This flamboyance is especially clear to modern viewers, who live in a culture where "real men" are expected to care little for their clothing. Conversely, Wentworth is typically depicted in the film wearing naval uniforms, which is a contrast to Bryan Marshall's version of the character in the 1971 adaptation. This uniform helps set Wentworth apart from many of the other male characters, allowing him to appear romantic but isolated. Gina and Andrew MacDonald had a similar view of the film, writing that it accurately captures Austen's satire by juxtaposing the upper classes' extravagance in fashion with the virtuous qualities of the Royal Navy. The naval men's profession is emphasised by the frequency of wearing their uniforms, in contrast to other adaptations of the novel.

=== Filming ===
Filming locations

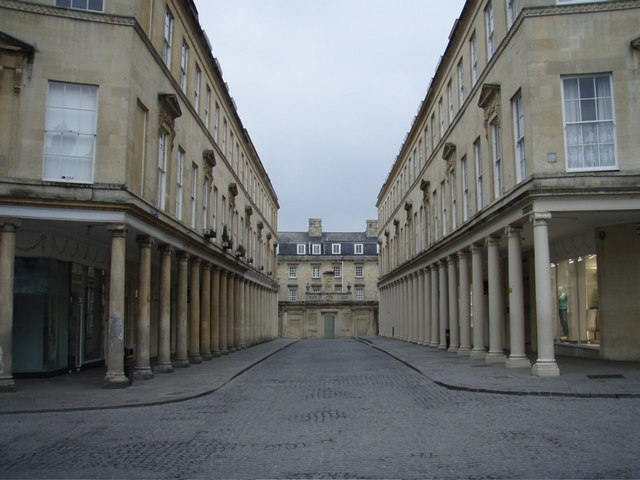
Much of Persuasion was filmed in Bath locations such as Bath Street.

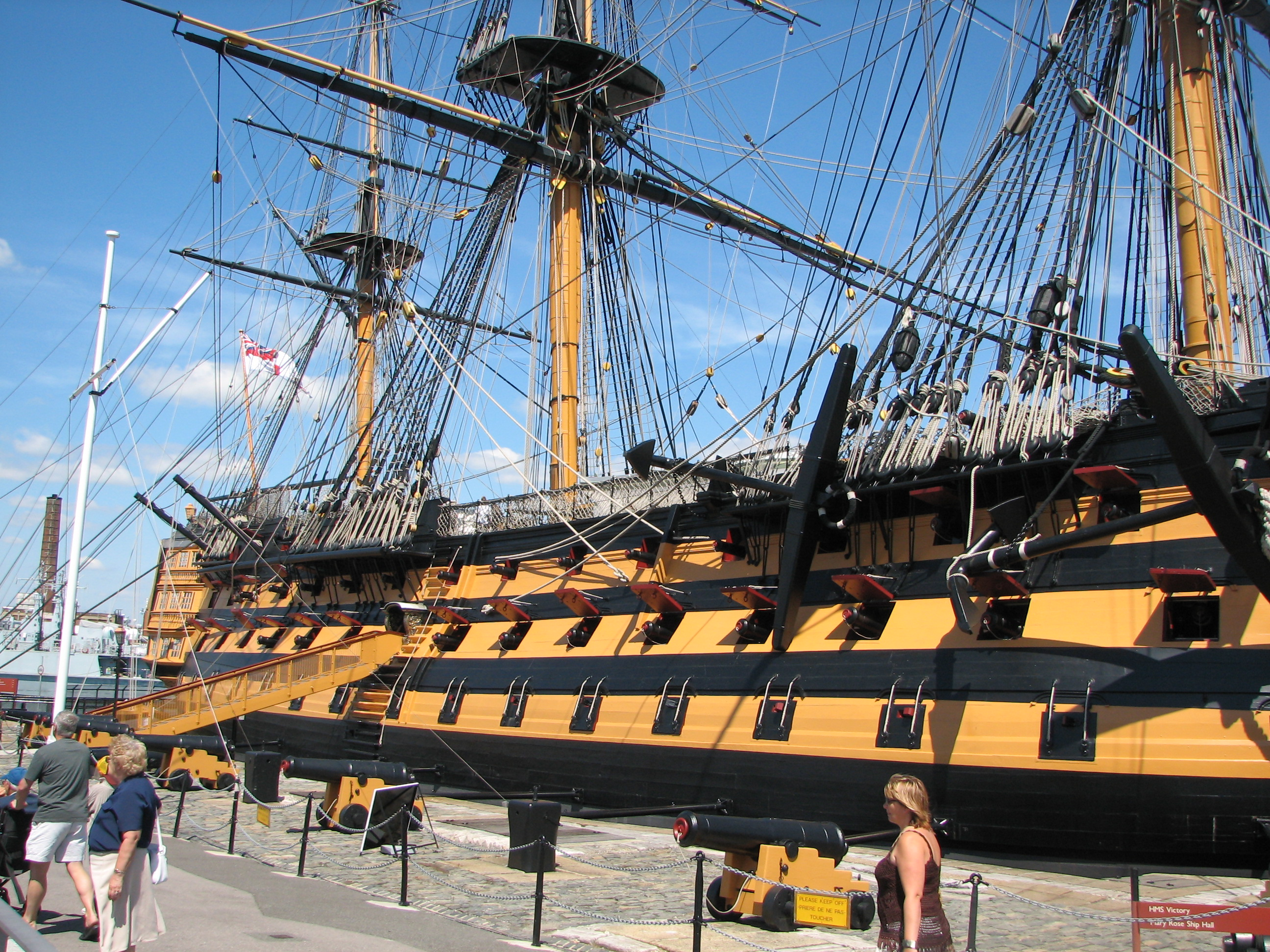
The film's final scene was shot on HMS Victory.

As a BBC production, Persuasion originally received a budget of £750,000. The British broadcaster proposed a collaboration with the American public television station WGBH Boston, a partnership that had also produced the American anthology television series Masterpiece Theatre as well as literary adaptations like the serial Pride and Prejudice. Rebecca Eaton, the executive producer of Masterpiece Theatre, approved the co-production as she had a preference for Persuasion out of all Austen's novels. The decision led to additional funding. Eaton would cite Persuasion as a successful example of WGBH using its small budget to invest in television projects, though she later expressed regret that the adaptation was two hours rather than a "luscious" six-part miniseries. Additionally, the French company Millesime co-produced the film in exchange for airing it on television in France. This decision further increased funding to £1,000,000. Mobil Oil Corporation, a major sponsor of Masterpiece Theatre, co-produced the film.

The diverse sources of funding meant that the production team had to field opinions from various sources. Millesime was unhappy with certain aspects of the story, for instance wanting the entire Lyme sequence removed because they considered it "too boring". WGBH gave the BBC detailed notes, which were then integrated into the script. One change concerned the ending. To display the climax when Anne and Wentworth finally approach each other with their feelings, two different scenes were shot, one in which they kiss and one in which they do not. Dear first wrote a scene closely modelled after Austen's ending: Anne reunites with Wentworth on the streets of Bath, and the two exchange words and hold hands. Eaton felt that after hours of waiting, audiences "would go nuts with frustration and irritation" if the two did not kiss. Eaton also thought "a kiss would be an emotional pay-off", and WGBH believed it would give the film a wider appeal. Michell agreed to compromise, opting to shoot one British version and one American version—the latter included the kiss. The American ending is reflected on the international poster, which shows the two protagonists embracing. While the kiss attracted some criticism among fans, actress Amanda Root defended it. "After the great suspense of the story, by the end you're desperate for Anne and Captain Wentworth to get together, desperate! Film is a visual medium, after all. You don't necessarily want to see them in bed together, but you do want to see something like a kiss", she said.

In comparison to its adaptations of the 1970s and 1980s, the BBC provided increased funding for many of its productions in the 1990s. Persuasion consequently benefited, allowing it to frequently film on-location in places including Lyme Regis and Bath, and the south-eastern English countryside. Both Lyme and Bath are prominent locales in Austen's novel. Dear desired the opening sequence be on board a Royal Navy ship of the period, but the only authentic vessel available was Nelson's HMS Victory. It was dry-docked as part of Portsmouth Historic Dockyard, and filming was only possible during short periods when the vessel was closed to the public. The final shot, in which Anne and Wentworth gaze into the ocean, was taken from the 1984 historical film The Bounty. The film's low budget also resulted in one of the opening shots, depicting Admiral Croft's ship on the ocean, being taken from The Bounty.

=== Music ===
The soundtrack used Chopin's Prelude in B, Nocturne in B and Prelude in G, and two of J. S. Bach's Sarabandes, in D and in B from his French Suites, the former played by Susan Tomes, the Bach by Sams. Tomes recalled that she was hired after the film had been shot and edited to another pianist's version, whose recording could not be used because permission could not be obtained, so she was asked “to duplicate the other pianist's timing exactly”, which she found almost impossible to do.

== Themes and analysis ==
=== Changes from source material ===
While Dear has received praise for "remarkably... retain[ing] most of the source novel's complex plot and numerous characters", literary scholars have noted significant differences between the film and the source material. Sarah R. Morrison observes that the film's version of Anne articulates thoughts that the character would never say in the novel. Morrison cites Anne's adamant defence of her visit to Mrs. Smith—where Anne visits a poor old friend rather than go to the party of a titled relative—in the film as an example, as "Austen's narrator makes it abundantly clear that Anne would never presume to dispute with her father upon such terms of absolute equality". The film's Anne also engages in actions not visible in the novel, such as her haste to stop Wentworth from leaving a musical concert when he feels demeaned by disparaging comments about his profession. Morrison attributes these differences to the difficulty in adapting novel to film, particularly as the latter form lacks a narrator to convey Anne's inner thoughts.

The film also expands upon Austen's subtle characterisation by exaggerating the emotions of characters and certain scenes. For example, in the novel during an early party, Anne offers to play the pianoforte as usual; while doing so, she is slightly tearful but also "extremely glad to be employed" and "unobserved". Conversely, Dear's screenplay has Wentworth quickly giving up his seat to Anne and then immediately dancing with the Musgrove sisters, furthering the contrast between Anne and the others. According to David Monaghan, Austen's novel displays a "relatively radical vision" of societal change, such as the rise of a professional class challenging the old order of landed gentry. Monaghan posits that this vision appealed to Dear and Michell, who used visuals and movement to emphasise this change. However, the two "deviate significantly" from the source material by depicting Anne and Wentworth as "single-mindedly oriented" to the future and thus 20th-century viewers' sensibilities.

Sue Parrill observes that Persuasion's larger production budget, which allowed the crew to film much content on location, "enabled the filmmakers to make fuller use of setting for symbolism and for creation of mood". The weather, for instance, is particularly important to Anne's state of mind in the novel. Persuasion's opening scenes establish its historical context as well as the financial predicament in which the Elliot family finds itself. Indeed, for Rachel Brownstein, by opening the film with a depiction of sailors, the director is confronting a common complaint about Austen's works—her failure to mention the Napoleonic Wars. The juxtaposition between the navy and the Elliots establishes their differences, with the former group discussing the fall of Napoleon and the latter group discussing the relatively minor inconvenience of overspending.

=== Class and gender ===
"The story essentially describes an old order fading away into decadence, and a new tribe, a meritocracy, coming to the fore. In other words, it marks the turning point between the eighteenth century and the nineteenth".

— Screenwriter Nick Dear

In his introduction to the published screenplay, Dear said he was in part attracted to adapt Persuasion because it depicted a "world in transition". To him, the novel showed "an old order fading away into decadence, and a new tribe, a meritocracy, coming to the fore". While directing, Roger Michell felt that the story included "the prototype of the postmodern family"—Anne's mother is dead, her father is bankrupt, and "the old social orders are breaking down". Root described Anne as a "feminist in a prefeminist period" and a "strong, independent character", to whom modern viewers can relate despite the story's period setting.

Austen scholars have studied the film's intersection with class and social change. Carole M. Dole notes that, among the many productions of Austen's work that appeared in the 1990s, Persuasion was the only one to "insistently draw attention to class issues", and "provide striking visual testimony to the workings of the British class system". The film, she adds, accomplishes this in part by focusing on the servants' faces, gauging their negative reactions to events. Richards, too, finds Michell "visually more aware" of the lower classes, adding that the film's inclusion of black servants alludes to the "colonial sources of wealth" supporting those superior in class and rank. Anne-Marie Scholz writes that the film and Emma Thompson's Sense and Sensibility both highlight the theme of class, but in different ways. Unlike Sense and Sensibility, Persuasion depicts general class divisions rather than just how the working class impacts the protagonists—the camera focuses on the faces and expressions of servants and working people, personifying them.

In Michell's opinion, Austen was a "proto-feminist" who possessed a "clear-sighted vision of the ways the world is tilted against women". As evidence, Michell cites a book scene in which Anne discusses how songs and proverbs about women's fickleness were all written by men. Scholz argues that Anne's marginal status as a woman in the film is linked to that of the servants; the parallel between class and gender is conveyed with Anne's trip to Uppercross in a cart containing animals. Julianne Pidduck adds that the director "pointedly foregrounds themes of class and gendered social constraint by juxtaposing the stuffy interiors of mannered society with the inviting, open horizons of the sea". As an example, Pidduck discusses Anne's stay in a gated residence in Bath, where she gazes out of an upper-storey window in search of Wentworth on the streets below. To her, Wentworth and the sea represent freedom and possibility.

== Reception ==
=== Release ===
Persuasion premiered on 16 April 1995, Easter Day, on the British television channel BBC Two. An estimated 3.8 million viewers watched the production. BBC Two aired it again on 25 December, Christmas Day. It also later aired on the American television channel PBS on 6 April 1997.

Near the end of filming, Rebecca Eaton noticed the growing "buzz" surrounding Austen and costume dramas in Hollywood. WGBH had never made a theatrical film before, but "decided to try its luck on the big screen". Sony Pictures Classics saw a cut of the adaptation and requested permission to show it in American cinemas, releasing it on 27 September 1995. There, it was characterised as an "art-house" film, with a small niche audience. It was shown at the Toronto and Chicago International Film Festivals. Persuasion earned $56,000 in its first week of release in New York and grossed $150,000 in Los Angeles. The total US gross was $5,269,757. The film also was given a limited cinema release in Australia, Germany, and France in 1996. It was less financially successful than the popular Sense and Sensibility, which was released in cinemas several months later. The film was released in VHS format on 12 November 1996; a DVD version followed on 1 February 2000.

=== Critical reception ===
"All this is brilliantly captured by Mr. Michell, with the screenwriter Nick Dear and a cast completely in sync with Austen's warm but piercing style. Their Persuasion is profoundly truthful in many ways: in its sense of emotional longing; in its natural, unglamorised visual beauty, ranging from drawing rooms to the sea; in its fidelity to the delicate tone of Austen's satire and romance".

— Caryn James in a review for The New York Times

Persuasion at first failed to attract many reviews. This changed when Pride and Prejudice and Sense and Sensibility were released in late 1995 to great success in the UK. Their reception lifted the earlier film out of obscurity, as Austen's popularity became apparent among critics. Persuasion garnered highly positive reviews from major film critics, and review aggregation website Rotten Tomatoes has since calculated a rating of 87%, which refers to the percentage of positive reviews based on 30 critics. Caryn James of The New York Times deemed it a "critic's pick", praising "a cast completely in sync with Austen's warm but piercing style". Jay Carr of The Boston Globe highlighted Root's performance, calling it "a heart-stoppingly reticent yet glorious debut".

In a contribution for The Washington Post, Desson Howe said "there's a wonderful, unhurried delicacy about Persuasion...as if everyone concerned with the production knows that, if given time and patience, Austen's genius will emerge. Thanks to assured performances, exacting direction and, of course, inspired writing, it does, in subtle, glorious ways". Writing for Entertainment Weekly, critic Ken Tucker graded the film with an "A−", saying it "should enthrall even those who haven't read" the novel. Tucker concluded that the film was "the sort of passionate yet precise comedy that reminds me why Austen remains such a vital writer". Susan Ostrov Weisser, a professor of 19th-century literature, called the film a "faithful parade of Austen's world", and praised Root as the film's "crown jewel" for playing a "fiercely intelligent, regretful, and frustrated Anne Elliot with subtlety and nuance". In 2008, James Rampton of The Independent rated it the fourth-best Austen adaptation of all time.

When reviewing, film critics often compared the respective adaptations of Persuasion and Sense and Sensibility. Directed by Ang Lee, Sense and Sensibility received more recognition and accolades from Hollywood, while Michell's production gained the admiration of up-market critics, who felt it was a more authentic and thoughtful representation of Austen's world. Janet Maslin of The New York Times, for instance, wrote that Sense and Sensibility "can't match the brilliant incisiveness of the more spartan Persuasion, still the most thoughtful new Austen adaptation". The Los Angeles Times characterised Persuasion as "the most authentically British version and the one closest to the spirit of the novels" and Sense and Sensibility as "the audience-friendly Hollywood version of Austen, easygoing and aiming to please". Time magazine named them both the best films of 1995, referring to Persuasion as "reserved" and Sense and Sensibility as "more bustling". Higson, when analysing both productions, felt Persuasion captured a sense of "gritty realism" that would influence such later Austen adaptations as Mansfield Park (1999) and Becoming Jane (2007).

=== Accolades ===
| Award | Category | Recipients and nominees | Result |
|---|---|---|---|
| British Academy Television Awards | Best Costume Design | Alexandra Byrne | Won |
| British Academy Television Awards | Best Design | William Dudley and Brian Sykes | Won |
| British Academy Television Awards | Best Make Up | Jean Speak | Nominated |
| British Academy Television Awards | Best Original Television Music | Jeremy Sams | Won |
| British Academy Television Awards | Best Photography and Lighting (Fiction/Entertainment) | John Daly | Won |
| British Academy Television Awards | Best Single Drama | Fiona Finlay, Roger Michell and Nick Dear | Won |
| National Board of Review | Top Ten Movies | Persuasion | Won |
| Royal Television Society | Costume Design | Alexandra Byrne | Won |
| Royal Television Society | Production Design | William Dudley and Brian Sykes | Won |
| Royal Television Society | Team Award (Craft) | Persuasion | Won |

== See also ==
- 1995 in film
- Jane Austen in popular culture
- Styles and themes of Jane Austen
- Screen Two
