= Carrie Cracknell =

British theatre director (born 1980)

- Born: 15 October 1980 (age 45); Carlisle, England
- Occupations: Theatre and Film Director
- Website: carriecracknell.com

Carrie Cracknell (born 15 October 1980) is a British theatre and film director.

She works regularly at the National Theatre. Her first feature film, Persuasion, is on Netflix. She was artistic director of the Gate Theatre, London, from 2007 to 2012. She was associate director at both the Young Vic (2012–2013) and the Royal Court (2013–2014).

== Life and career ==
=== Early years and education ===
Cracknell was born in Carlisle and was raised in Oxford. She read history at the University of Nottingham, where she was president of the Nottingham New Theatre. She later studied directing at the Royal Scottish Academy of Music and Drama in Glasgow. She then trained at the National Theatre.

=== Career ===
At university, she set up a production company called Hush with a group of friends including the actor Ruth Wilson. Their first show transferred to New York and London while they were still studying. At the age of 26, Cracknell became the youngest artistic director of a professional theatre in Britain when she and Natalie Abrahami took over the Gate Theatre in Notting Hill, which they ran for 5 years and where she directed extensively.

Her first dance/theatre collaboration at the Gate Theatre, I Am Falling, transferred to Sadler's Wells and was nominated for a South Bank Show Award. After leaving the Gate, Cracknell went on to create her production of A Doll's House which ran twice at the Young Vic before transferring to the Duke of York's Theatre's in the West End and the Brooklyn Academy of Music in New York and for which she was nominated for the Evening Standard Best Director Award. It led to her developing the short film Nora with Nick Payne in response to the play which was produced by the Young Vic. She then went on to direct her first opera, Berg's Wozzeck, for the English National Opera at the London Coliseum, which was nominated for an Olivier Award and an International Opera Award. In 2019 she directed Jake Gyllenhaal and Tom Sturridge in Seawall/A Life at The Public Theater and on Broadway, receiving four Tony nominations, for Best Play, Best Performance by an Actor in a Leading Role twice, for both Gyllenhaal and Sturridge, and Best Sound Design in a Play for Daniel Kluger.

Cracknell now regularly collaborates with the Royal National Theatre, where her credits include her productions of The Grapes of Wrath, Medea, A Deep Blue Sea (both were live-streamed into cinemas internationally as part of National Theatre Live), Blurred Lines and Julie (a new version of Strindberg's Miss Julie by Polly Stenham, also NT Live.) Other credits include Macbeth and Electra (Young Vic), Birdland and Pigeons (Royal Court Theatre), Oil (Almeida Theatre), A Doll's House, and Stacy (National Theatre of Scotland).

== Works ==
=== Theatre ===
- The Hush – 2002, Battersea Arts Centre, Ohio Theatre, New York
- Macbeth – 2002, Lakeside Arts Centre, Nottingham
- A Mobile Thriller – 2004, Traverse Theatre, Battersea Arts Centre, Harbourfront Toronto, Bristol Old Vic, national tour
- Death and the City – 2005, Tron Theatre
- Stacy by Jack Thorne – 2005, Tron Theatre
- Broken Road by Ryan Craig – 2005, British Council Showcase, Battersea Arts Centre; Fringe First Award
- The Sexual Neuroses of Our Parents – 2007, Gate Theatre (London)
- Hedda by Ibsen, adapted by Lucy Kirkwood – 2008, Gate Theatre
- I Am Falling – 2008, Gate Theatre and Sadler's Wells; nominated for Southbank Show Award
- Armageddon by Mark Ravenhill – 2008, Gate Theatre
- Dolls after Takeshi Kitano's 2002 film Dolls – 2009, National Theatre of Scotland
- Breathing Irregular – 2009/2010, Gate Theatre,
- Elektra – 2010, Gate Theatre/Headlong
- Electra – 2011, Gate Theatre/Young Vic
- A Doll's House by Ibsen – 2012, Young Vic
- Wozzeck – 2013, London Coliseum
- Searched – 2013, Royal Court Theatre Rough Cuts
- A Doll's House – 2014, Brooklyn Academy of Music
- Medea – 14 July – 4 September 2014, Royal National Theatre
- Birdland – 2014, Royal Court Theatre
- Blurred Lines – 2014, Royal National Theatre
- Macbeth – 2015, Young Vic
- Oil – 2016, Almeida Theatre
- The Deep Blue Sea – 2016, Royal National Theatre
- Julie by Polly Stenham after Strindberg's Miss Julie – 2018, Royal National Theatre
- Sea Wall/A Life – 2019, The Public Theater, New York and Hudson Theatre, New York
- Portia Coughlan – 2023, Almeida Theatre
- The Grapes of Wrath – 2024 National Theatre
- Carmen – 2024 Metropolitan Opera

=== Film ===
Year	Title	Director	Writer	Producer	Notes
2022	Persuasion	Yes	No	No	
