= Frederick Wentworth (Persuasion) =

- Persuasion character
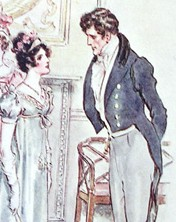
- Frederick Wentworth and Anne Elliot in 1815 (C. E. Brock, 1909)
- Created by: Jane Austen

In-universe information
- Occupation: Captain (Royal Navy) in the Royal Navy, veteran of the Napoleonic Wars
- Family: Edward Wentworth (brother); Sophia Croft (sister)

Captain Frederick Wentworth is a fictional character in the 1817 novel Persuasion written by Jane Austen. He is the prototype of the new gentleman in the 19th century: a self-made man who makes his fortune by hard work rather than inheritance.

== Character ==
Over eight years before the novel opens, Frederick Wentworth travelled to Somerset after being promoted to commander in reward for his participation in the 1806 Battle of San Domingo. He was not immediately sent back to sea, but went to stay with his brother, Reverend Edward Wentworth, the curate of Monkford. Frederick and Anne fell in love and got engaged. Later, Anne broke off the engagement on the advice of her godmother, Lady Russell, who saw him as an unsuitable choice due to his lack of fortune and connections, as well as his enrollment in a dangerous profession. Further, Anne was young and might have more choices in her future. Disappointed and resentful, Wentworth left the area.

Captain Wentworth returns from the Napoleonic Wars in 1814, successful, and with prize money of 25,000 pounds to his credit. Anne's conditions have also changed as her father, a spendthrift baronet, has had to lease his country house, Kellynch Hall, to Admiral and Mrs Croft, and move to Bath to lower his expenses. Anne currently is visiting her married younger sister, Mary Musgrove, at Uppercross. Mrs Croft is sister to Frederick Wentworth, and he visits her once she and her husband are settled.

Captain Wentworth has not forgiven Anne. Without much thought, he is sociable with both Musgrove sisters, Henrietta and Louisa, sisters to Mary's husband Charles. Wentworth is therefore seeing Anne often as part of the Uppercross family circle. Henrietta re-connects with her fiancé, Charles Hayter. Wentworth talks about a firm mind, influencing Louisa to be more demanding than usual. When others talk to him as if his engagement to Louisa is all but announced, he realizes from honour that he must marry her if she so wishes.

Captain Wentworth is aware of Anne, and listens to what others say about her. He learns that she turned down an offer of marriage from Charles Musgrove about five years earlier, which startles him. Anne guards her emotions for each encounter with Frederick in the group at Uppercross. A trip to Lyme with the Musgrove family to meet Captains Harville and Benwick changes everything. There Louisa meets with a serious accident; Anne's immediate help and level-headed behaviour makes Wentworth realise his folly in letting appearances get ahead of his intentional choices. Once Louisa is settled for her long recovery with the Harvilles, Wentworth goes off for a long visit to his now-married brother Edward in Shropshire.

He begins to realise that by indulging his injured pride, hurt by the rejection by Anne, he may be blocking his best chance at happiness, and his love for Anne is allowed to surface again. Benwick, residing with the Harville family having been engaged to Harville's sister who died before they could marry, stays while Louisa slowly recovers.

When Louisa is recovered, the news spreads that Captain Benwick is engaged to her. Safe and independent again, Frederick Wentworth goes to Bath to win Anne back, only to spy a competitor in her cousin, Mr. William Elliot, the inheritor of Kellynch Hall. They meet at a few gatherings, with brief moments to speak with each other. At a gathering of the Musgroves in a Bath hotel, he overhears Captain Harville and Anne talk about the relative faithfulness of men and women. Deeply moved by Anne's words, he writes her a letter and makes sure she sees it. They reconcile and renew their love and engagement. He learns in those discussions that when he had come ashore in 1808 ("the year eight"), after winning his step to captain and with his first prize money, had he written to her, would she have replied? Yes, she would have replied and felt safe-enough to renew the engagement against the wishes of her family. He realises how he has been his own enemy in this. In the end they marry and live a happy life. Nothing remains to blight their happiness other than a future war, when the Navy might call him back to a ship.

== Literary significance ==
Captain Frederick Wentworth has been described as an example of the “new gentleman,” combining traditional qualities such as good manners and sensitivity with the independence and professionalism associated with a naval officer. Unlike Sir Walter, who inherited and squandered his wealth, Wentworth earned his fortune through his naval career. Although his social standing did not traditionally match that of Anne Elliot, the novel presents his personal qualities as sufficient to overcome class differences.

In the novel, Captain Wentworth's character develops, eventually overcoming his resentment at being once refused, in order to make another ardent overture to his chosen bride. This development is sign of a promising future for their relationship. Like Admiral Croft, who allows his wife to drive the carriage alongside him and to help him steer, Captain Wentworth will defer to Anne throughout their marriage. Austen envisions this kind of equal partnership as the ideal marriage, within the limits of 18th century social customs.

Margaret Wilson sees Wentworth as combining the dynamic character of Austen's earlier diversionary men and the steadfast qualities needed in a husband.

The love letter written by Captain Wentworth is notable:

I can listen no longer in silence. I must speak to you by such means as are within my reach. You pierce my soul. I am half agony, half hope. Tell me not that I am too late, that such precious feelings are gone for ever. I offer myself to you again with a heart even more your own than when you almost broke it, eight years and a half ago. Dare not say that man forgets sooner than woman, that his love has an earlier death. I have loved none but you. Unjust I may have been, weak and resentful I have been, but never inconstant. You alone have brought me to Bath. For you alone, I think and plan. Have you not seen this? Can you fail to have understood my wishes? I had not waited even these ten days, could I have read your feelings, as I think you must have penetrated mine. I can hardly write. I am every instant hearing something which overpowers me. You sink your voice, but I can distinguish the tones of that voice when they would be lost on others. Too good, too excellent creature! You do us justice, indeed. You do believe that there is true attachment and constancy among men. Believe it to be most fervent, most undeviating, in F. W.

I must go, uncertain of my fate; but I shall return hither, or follow your party, as soon as possible. A word, a look, will be enough to decide whether I enter your father's house this evening or never.

The letter comes near the end of the novel, leading Anne and Frederick to renew their love.

== Depictions in film and television ==
- 1960: Paul Daneman, BBC series Persuasion (1960 series)
- 1971: Bryan Marshall, BBC series Persuasion (1971 series)
- 1995: Ciarán Hinds, made-for-television Persuasion (1995 film)
- 2007: Rupert Penry-Jones, ITV1 Persuasion (2007 film)
- 2022: Cosmo Jarvis, Netflix film Persuasion (2022 film)
