= Kenilworth (TV series) =

1957 British TV series

Kenilworth is a British television series which aired in 1957 on the BBC Television Service. An adaptation of the 1821 novel of the same title by Sir Walter Scott, it consisted of six 30-minute episodes. The series is missing and believed to be lost. It was a historical drama set during the reign of Elizabeth I and portraying several well-known figures from the era.

All 6 episodes produced for the series are believed now to be lost.

== Cast ==
- Paul Eddington as Edmund Tressilian
- Anthony Newlands as Richard Varney
- Ann Firbank as Amy Robsart
- Robin Bailey as Robert Dudley, Earl of Leicester
- Stuart Hutchison as Walter Raleigh
- Howard Lamb as Edmund Blount
- Manning Wilson as Thomas Ratcliffe, Earl of Sussex
- Maxine Audley as Queen Elizabeth I
- Alan Edwards as Wayland Smith
- Margaret Tyzack as Janet
- Robert Hunter as Anthony Foster
- Hamish Roughead as Bowyer, Usher of the Black Rod
