= Yolanda Kettle =

English actress (born 1988)

- Born: 1988 (age 37–38); Birmingham, England, UK.
- Education: London Academy of Music and Dramatic Art
- Occupation: Actress
- Years active: 2012–present

Yolanda Kettle (born 1988) is an English actress known for playing Camilla Fry in The Crown (2017), Dolly Wilcox in Howards End (2017), and Joy Pelling in the BBC political drama Roadkill (2020).

== Early life ==
Yolanda Kettle was born in 1988 in Birmingham, England. Her mother is Spanish and her is father English. She went to King Edward VI Camp Hill School in Birmingham. After leaving secondary school, she moved to London to study acting at the London Academy of Music and Dramatic Art (LAMDA). Kettle is also an alumna of the National Youth Theatre

== Career ==
Kettle's first major role was on stage at the Arcola Theatre as Nina in Anton Chekhov’s The Seagull alongside Geraldine James in 2011. She played Dolly Wilcox in Howards End in 2017, and in the same year had a role in series 2 of The Crown, playing Camilla Fry, wife of chocolate entrepreneur Jeremy Fry, both of whom were friends with Princess Margaret's love interest, Antony Armstrong-Jones. In 2020, Kettle played the role of Joy Pelling in the BBC political drama Roadkill.

Kettle joined the cast of a new Netflix and MRC Jane Austen film Persuasion; filming began in the UK in June 2021.

== Filmography ==
=== Film, video, live streaming, and theatre ===
Year	Title	Role
2016	National Theatre Live: The Deep Blue Sea	Ann Welch
2017	Need for Speed Payback (video game)	Voice Talent (voice)
2017	Nioh (video game)	Maria
2018	Hitman 2 (video game)	Andrea Martinez (voice)
2020	Made in Italy	Ruth
2020	Nioh 2 (video game)	Maria
2020	Upstairs (short)	Caroline
2022	Persuasion	Elizabeth Elliot

=== Television ===
Year	Title	Role	Notes
2012	Doctors	Laura Carew	Series 14, "Now They'll Sleep"
2012	Holby City	Zoe Hardwick	Series 15, "The Ties That Bind"
2015	Father Brown	Natasha Farrango	Series 3, "The Deadly Seal"
2016	The Collection	Cecile Trouvier	1 episode - "The Weekend"
2016	Love, Nina	Amanda	Episode 1.4
2017	The Crown	Camilla Fry	Series 2, "Matrimonium" and "Beryl"
2017	Howards End	Dolly Wilcox	3 episodes
2017	Doc Martin	Hannah Butler	Series 8, "Accidental Hero and Mysterious Ways"
2018	Marcella	Becky Marani	8 episodes
2020	Roadkill	Joy Pelling	3 episodes

=== Stage ===
Year	Title	Roles	Notes
2022	Patriots	Marina Litvinenko/Nina Berezovsky	Almeida Theatre
2023	The Interview	Diana, Princess of Wales	Park Theatre
2024	The Comeuppance	Caitlin	Almeida Theatre
