= Persuasion (2022 film) =

- Official release poster
- Directed by: Carrie Cracknell
- Screenplay by: Ronald Bass; Alice Victoria Winslow
- Based on: Persuasion by Jane Austen
- Produced by: Andrew Lazar; Christina Weiss Lurie
- Starring: Dakota Johnson; Cosmo Jarvis; Nikki Amuka-Bird; Mia McKenna-Bruce; Richard E. Grant; Henry Golding
- Cinematography: Joe Anderson
- Edited by: Pani Scott
- Music by: Stuart Earl
- Production companies: MRC; Bisous Pictures; Mad Chance; Fourth and Twenty Eight Films
- Distributed by: Netflix
- Release dates: July 8, 2022 (United States); July 15, 2022 (Netflix)
- Running time: 109 minutes
- Country: United States
- Language: English

Persuasion is a 2022 American historical romance film based on Jane Austen's 1817 novel of the same name. It was directed by Carrie Cracknell from a screenplay by Ron Bass and Alice Victoria Winslow. The film stars Dakota Johnson, Cosmo Jarvis, Nikki Amuka-Bird, Mia McKenna-Bruce, Richard E. Grant, and Henry Golding.

Persuasion was released to theaters in the United States on July 8, 2022, a week before its streaming release on July 15, 2022, by Netflix.

== Plot ==
It has been 8 years since Anne Elliot broke off her engagement to Frederick Wentworth, at the time a young and undistinguished naval officer. He was considered clever, confident and ambitious, but his low social status and lack of wealth made Anne's friends and family view him as an unsuitable partner. Furthermore, Lady Russell, a distant relative whom Anne considers to be a second mother to her after her own died, also saw the relationship as imprudent for one so young, so persuaded Anne to break off the engagement.

Sir Walter Elliot, his debts mounting, reluctantly agrees to lease their family estate Kellynch Hall to Admiral Croft. Sir Walter and Anne’s sister Elizabeth, along with the widowed Mrs Penelope Clay, go to Bath. However, Anne is instructed to care for her sister Mary, who has taken ill.

Admiral Croft and his wife arrive and reveal that Mrs. Croft's brother is Wentworth. While visiting Mary, the Admiral, his wife and Captain Wentworth are expected for dinner; Mary recovers from her illness for the dinner, so Anne volunteers to sit with Mary's injured son to miss the dinner. Unknowing of their previous attachment, one of Mary's sisters-in-law, Louisa, encourages Anne to pursue Captain Wentworth but ends up doing so herself.

The group, including Mary's family, Anne, Louisa, and Wentworth, travel to Lyme to enjoy a holiday by the sea and meet some of Captain Wentworth's naval friends, including Captains Benwick and Harville. Louisa's infatuation with Wentworth is obvious, and Anne tries to hide her feelings. Anne and Wentworth agree to be friends, and the group encounters a mysterious gentleman who seems to be interested in Anne. They discover his identity after he has departed to Bath: William Elliot, cousin to the family, who stands to inherit everything.

Louisa, in a misguided attempt at flirtation, has Captain Wentworth catch her as she jumps down the last stairs of a staircase. She tries to repeat the act from a greater height, despite Wentworth's objections, and is seriously injured. Captain Benwick fetches a doctor, and Mary resolves to stay with her while Anne goes to Bath.

In Bath, Anne is reacquainted with William Elliot, who begins to pursue her. He also states that his intention in Bath is to ensure Anne's father does not marry Mrs Clay, who could bear a son that would displace him as heir to the estate. Anne becomes distraught upon learning of Louisa's engagement to a naval captain following her recovery, assuming it to be Wentworth. Wentworth arrives and reveals that he has been made an offer of a ship and is deciding whether to take it. Upon seeing William Elliot's pursuit of Anne, he decides to accept the offer.

Mary's family and Captain Harville arrive in Bath for a visit, and Anne learns that it is Captain Benwick Louisa is engaged to marry, the two of them having fallen in love during her convalescence. Wentworth overhears Anne and Harville discussing the relative faithfulness of men and women in love. Deeply moved by what Anne says about women not giving up their feelings of love even when all hope is lost, Wentworth writes her a note declaring his feelings for her and departs. Anne runs after him, along the way seeing William Elliot in a romantic embrace with Mrs Clay.

Anne and Captain Wentworth declare themselves to each other and embrace. William Elliot and Mrs Clay marry. Later, Wentworth shows Anne how to use a sextant while the happy couple look out over the ocean as they talk of their impending naval voyage.

== Cast ==
- Dakota Johnson as Anne Elliot
- Cosmo Jarvis as Captain Frederick Wentworth
- Henry Golding as Mr. William Elliot
- Nikki Amuka-Bird as Lady Russell
- Mia McKenna-Bruce as Mary Musgrove
- Richard E. Grant as Sir Walter Elliot
- Ben Bailey Smith as Charles Musgrove
- Nia Towle as Louisa Musgrove
- Izuka Hoyle as Henrietta Musgrove
- Yolanda Kettle as Elizabeth Elliot
- Edward Bluemel as Captain Harville
- Afolabi Alli as Captain Benwick
- Jenny Rainsford as Mrs. Harville
- Lydia Rose Bewley as Mrs. Penelope Clay

== Production ==
In April 2021, it was announced Dakota Johnson had joined the cast of the film, with Carrie Cracknell directing from a screenplay by Ron Bass and Alice Victoria Winslow, based on the novel of the same name by Jane Austen, with Netflix set to distribute. In May 2021, Henry Golding, Cosmo Jarvis, Richard E. Grant, Nikki Amuka-Bird, Ben Bailey Smith, Izuka Hoyle, Mia McKenna-Bruce, and Nia Towle joined the cast of the film. In June 2021, Edward Bluemel, Lydia Rose Bewley, and Yolanda Kettle joined the cast of the film.

Principal photography began in May 2021.

== Reception ==
On the review aggregator website Rotten Tomatoes, 30% of 138 critics' reviews are positive, with an average rating of 5/10. The website's consensus reads: "Despite Dakota Johnson's best efforts, the chaotically anachronistic Persuasion fails to convince as a worthwhile Austen adaptation." On Metacritic, the film has a weighted average score of 42 out of 100 based on 37 critics, indicating mixed or average reviews.

Variety's Peter Debruge found Carrie Cracknell to have "gone and done a strange thing with the book", by trying to "modernize it, borrowing heavily from Fleabag with its fourth-wall-breaking gimmicks", while "casting a free-spirited, fully liberated American star, Dakota Johnson, as Anne — all of which strips the novel of its core tension." Christy Lemire from the Roger Ebert website found Dakota Johnson offering in the film "a taste of her under-appreciated comic timing", though she claims "it's impossible to care about whether Anne ends up with Frederick Wentworth because, as played by Cosmo Jarvis, he is so stiff and uncharismatic." The Guardian's Stuart Heritage wrote that the "attempt to modernize the classic novel has led to a disaster of anachronistic dialogue and annoyingly wry glances at the camera," while Vox critic Constance Grady found the film an "absolute disaster." The Spectator went so far as to proclaim in its review that "everyone involved should be in prison."

Vanity Fair cited Persuasion as a work that fails to utilize breaking the fourth wall successfully, writing that it "risk[s] structural damage" to itself due to breaking the fourth wall in an unnecessary and "narratively jarring" way.
