= Persuasion (1960 TV series) =

1960 British television drama series

- Written by: Jane Austen
- Screenplay by: Barbara Burnham; Michael Voysey
- Directed by: Campbell Logan
- Starring: Daphne Slater; Paul Daneman
- Country of origin: United Kingdom
- Original language: English
- No. of episodes: 4 (all missing)

Production
- Producer: Campbell Logan
- Running time: 30 min. episodes (approx.)

Original release
- Network: BBC One
- Release: 30 December 1960 – 20 January 1961

Persuasion is a 1960 British television mini-series adaptation of the 1817 Jane Austen novel of the same name. It was produced by the BBC and was directed by Campbell Logan. Daphne Slater stars as Anne Elliot, and Paul Daneman as Captain Frederick Wentworth. The mini-series has four episodes, each half an hour in length.

According to shmoop.com, this mini-series was most likely wiped in the BBC clean-out of the 1970s.

== Cast ==
- Daphne Slater as Anne Elliot
- Paul Daneman as Captain Wentworth
- George Curzon as Sir Walter Elliot
- Jane Hardie as Elizabeth Elliot
- Fabia Drake as Lady Russell
- Thea Holme as Mrs. Croft
- William Mervyn as Admiral Croft
- Clare Austin as Mary Musgrove
- Edward Jewesbury as Charles Musgrove
- Jill Dixon as Louisa Musgrove
- Diane Clare as Henrietta Musgrove
- Timothy West as Charles Hayter
- Olga Lindo as Mrs. Musgrove
- Wensley Pithey as Mr. Musgrove
- Daphne Anderson as Mrs. Clay
- Derek Blomfield as Mr. Elliot
- Philip Howard as Footman
- Patricia Cree as the Honourable Miss Carteret
- Agnes Lauchlan as Dowager Viscountess Dalrymple
