= Persuasion (1971 TV series) =

1971 British television drama series

- Written by: Jane Austen
- Screenplay by: Julian Mitchell
- Directed by: Howard Baker
- Starring: Ann Firbank; Bryan Marshall
- Theme music composer: Steven Hancock
- Country of origin: United Kingdom
- Original language: English
- No. of episodes: 5

Production
- Producer: Howard Baker
- Running time: 50 mins per episode (excluding commercials)

Original release
- Network: ITV
- Release: 18 April – 16 May 1971

Persuasion is a 1971 British television serial adaptation of the 1817 Jane Austen novel of the same name. It was produced by Granada Television for ITV and was directed by Howard Baker. The series stars Ann Firbank as Anne Elliott and Bryan Marshall as Captain Wentworth. It was originally aired in April and May 1971 in five episodes.

== Synopsis ==
Anne Elliot is the second daughter of the widowed baronet Sir Walter Elliot, who unlike her vain father and sisters, is humble, sensible and modest. The family discuss their fall into financial difficulty, largely because of Sir Walter's wayward spending. Several ideas are suggested, but either Sir Walter or his eldest daughter Elizabeth (who is very like her father), refuse them, as they cast some taint on the family name. Finally Sir Walter's friend and soliticitor Mr. Shepherd, at the urging of Anne and Lady Russell, persuade Sir Walter to let out his ancestral home, Kellynch Hall, and move to Bath, where he can say he is taking in the waters for his health. Mr. Shepherd strongly urges this because, with the return of the fleet due to what appears to be the end of the Napoleonic Wars, there will be a demand for fine housing by newly rich naval officers. Shortly thereafter, Mr Shepherd finds a suitable tenant in Admiral Croft and his wife Mrs. Croft, the sister of Captain Wentworth—who, it seems, is already known to Anne and her family.

Captain Wentworth was engaged previously to Anne Elliott, eight and half years earlier, and we learn that Lady Russell, Anne's guardian, persuaded Anne not to go through with the marriage because of his then-lack of a fortune or good family. Since then, however, Wentworth went to sea and made his fortune, and now is returning to Somerset to find a bride.

Sir Walter and Elizabeth leave Kellynch Hall for Bath, but Anne goes to visit her other sister, Mary Musgrove, who is married to Mr Charles Musgrove. Charles was also a suitor of Anne's seven or so years ago, but Anne refused him, and so he turned his affections to the younger and self-centered Mary. Since then, Musgrove and Mary have had two little boys that Mary has alternatively ignored and spoilt immoderately. While staying with the Musgroves, Wentworth comes to visit. Anne and Wentworth barely speak to one another, and Wentworth takes up what appears to be an affection for Charles Musgrove's two young sisters, Louisa and Henrietta. The attraction to Henrietta fades as she renews her vows to the young vicar in the area, so things start to look more and more like Louisa Musgrove has won Wentworth's attention. Soon everyone is talking about the pair; but nothing has been settled. Wentworth mentions that he has to go to Lyme, a seaport town, to visit his friends, Mr and Mrs Harville, and Louisa hits upon the idea of the whole party of six going as well to visit Lyme as a daytrip.

It is during the trip to Lyme, that Louisa, showing off, jumps off a wall, hoping to be caught by Wentworth, but instead strikes her head against the pavement and falls unconscious. Anne takes charge of the situation while everyone else is too distressed to think properly. The doctor is very foreboding about Louisa's prospects. As they are in a stranger's house, Louisa's brother says that he will stay and take care of things that are needed; but after further discussion it is decided that Anne will stay to be Louisa's nurse. But then her sister Mary, very jealous of being thought second-best in ability to care for Louisa, insists that she shall be the nurse, and so, no longer needed, Anne leaves Lyme, first to return to the Musgroves, and then to join her father and Elizabeth in Bath.

At Bath news comes that Louisa has recovered and is no longer interested in Wentworth but found another suitor. This makes Anne hopeful of reconciliation with Wentworth, and she makes every effort to approach him. But now her own cousin, Mr. Elliot, begins to show interest in her, which is highly approved by not only Lady Russell, Anne's champion, but also by sister Elizabeth and Sir Walter.

Things seem a jumble when Anne meets Wentworth's friend, Captain Harville, this time at the hotel in Bath where the Musgroves have come to get ready for Henrietta's and Louisa's nuptials. Anne and Harville engage in a deeply felt exchange about whether men, or women, are more fickle or more constant in their affections. Captain Wentworth overhears their conversation and is struck by it. He proposes to Anne in a letter which he leaves for her in the hotel. The series ends at a party to congratulate the couple, at which it is discovered that the deceitful cousin Mr. Elliot, and Elizabeth's apparently steady, but in reality also deceitful, friend, Mrs. Clay, secretly have gone off together.

== Cast ==
- Ann Firbank as Anne Elliot
- Bryan Marshall as Captain Wentworth
- Basil Dignam as Sir Walter Elliot
- Valerie Gearon as Elizabeth Elliot
- Marian Spencer as Lady Russell
- Georgine Anderson as Mrs. Croft
- Richard Vernon as Admiral Croft
- Morag Hood as Mary Musgrove
- Rowland Davies as Charles Musgrove
- Mel Martin as Henrietta Musgrove
- Zhivila Roche as Louisa Musgrove
- Noel Dyson as Mrs. Musgrove
- William Kendall as Mr. Musgrove
- Charlotte Mitchell as Mrs. Clay
- David Savile as Mr. Elliot
- Gabrielle Daye as Mrs. Rooke
