= Ann Firbank =

Indian-born British actress (born 1932)

- Born: 9 January 1932 (age 94); Secunderabad, British India
- Occupation: Actress
- Years active: 1954–present

Ann Firbank (born 9 January 1932), also known as Annie Firbank, is an Indian-born British actress. One of Firbank's more notable roles is her 1971 portrayal of Anne Elliot in the serial Persuasion, an adaptation of Jane Austen's novel of the same name.

== Career ==
Firbank starred as Anne Elliot in the ITV serial Persuasion, a 1971 adaptation of the Jane Austen novel of the same name. Her film credits include the 1967 film Accident, The Scarlet Pimpernel (1982) and Anna and the King (1999). In 2005, Firbank appeared in the costume drama Elizabeth I alongside Dame Helen Mirren.

Firbank appeared in a 2012 production of The Golden Dragon at the Jagriti Theatre in Bangalore, India. A reviewer for The Hindu praised Firbank's performance, writing that the "energetic and youthful at 79" actress "stands out for her stage presence". In 2014, Firbank appeared in a production of the play The Crucible at the Old Vic, playing Rebecca Nurse.

== Personal life ==
She was born in Secunderabad, near Hyderabad to a British Army officer in India. She is a Royal Academy of Dramatic Art graduate. She had been engaged to the actor Patric Doonan when he was married to actress Aud Johansen. Doonan was a victim of suicide in 1958.

== Select filmography ==
=== Film ===
- Behind the Mask (1958) as Mrs Judson
- Carry On Nurse (1958) as Staff Nurse Helen Lloyd
- Nothing Barred (1961) as Lady Katherine
- Darling (1965) as Sybil Martin
- Dead Man's Chest (1965) as Mildred Jones
- A Man Could Get Killed (1966) as Miss Nolan
- Accident (1967) as Laura
- A Severed Head (1970) as Rosemary Lynch-Gibbon
- Sunday Bloody Sunday (1971) as Party Guest
- Asylum (1972) as Anna
- Brief Encounter (1974) as Melanie Harvey
- The Scarlet Pimpernel (1982) as Countess de Tournay
- A Passage to India (1984) as Mrs. Callendar
- Hotel Du Lac (1986) as Penelope Milne
- Foreign Body (1986) as Mrs Plumb
- Anna and the King (1999) as Lady Bradley
- Star Wars: The Rise of Skywalker (2019) as Tatooine Elder

=== Television ===
- Kenilworth (1957) as Amy Robsart
- Leave It to Todhunter (1958) as Felicity Farroway
- Emergency Ward 10 (1960–63) as Mary Nesbitt
- Danger Man (1961) as Bobby in episode "The Island"
- The Plane Makers (1964–65) as Pamela Wilder
- Persuasion (1971) as Anne Elliot
- The Lotus Eaters (1972 TV series) "The present Mrs Clive" as Lorna Clive
- The Nearly Man (1975) as Alice Collinson
- Space 1999 (1977) as Consul Varda in "The Dorcons"
- Lillie (1978) as Queen Alexandra
- Crown Court (1973–75, 1981) as Sarah Gibson
- Agatha Christie's Poirot (1989) as Miss Henderson
- Bergerac (1989) S7E4 The Other Woman as Sheila King
- Heartbeat (1993) S2, E2, End of the Line as Agnes Tripp
- Elizabeth I (2005) as Lady Anne
- Midsomer Murders (2009) The Black Book as Felicity Law
- New Tricks "Ghosts" (2014) as Nancy Evans

Theatre

- Go Back for Murder (Duchess Theatre) (1960)
- Billy Liar, West Yorkshire Playhouse (2010)
- The Golden Dragon, Jagriti Theatre (2012)
- The Crucible, the Old Vic (2014)
- Blood Wedding, the Young Vic (2019)
