= Daphne Slater =

English actress (1928–2012)

Daphne Slater in Armchair Theatre, 1962

Daphne Helen Slater (3 March 1928 – 4 October 2012) was an English actress noted for Shakespearean and period films.

== Biography ==
She was born in London and educated at Haberdashers' Aske's School for Girls, when it was in Acton, before attending the Royal Academy of Dramatic Art, where she won the academy's gold medal.

Frequently lavished with praise by Kenneth Tynan, the most influential critic of his day, Slater divided her career between Shakespearean roles and appearances in television plays. After leaving RADA with a Gold Medal, she was snapped up by the film director Herbert Wilcox, who gave her a seven-year contract and a leading role in The Courtneys of Curzon Street (1947) and she played major screen parts in dozens of television dramas and novel adaptations, including the role of Queen Mary I in the 1971 BBC TV serial Elizabeth R opposite Glenda Jackson.

== Death ==
Slater died on 4 October 2012, aged 84. She was predeceased by her brother and her second husband. She was survived by her first husband John Harrison (born 1924), film/television actor, director and producer and their two sons, Stephen and William.

== Roles ==
- The Courtneys of Curzon Street (1947) .... Cynthia Carmody
- Emma (1948) (TV) .... Harriet Smith
- Pride and Prejudice (1952) (TV miniseries) .... Elizabeth Bennet
- Romeo and Juliet (1954) Stratford-upon-Avon RSC Theatre ... Rosalind
- Jane Eyre (1956) (TV) .... Jane Eyre
- Precious Bane (1957) TV series .... Prue Sarn
- BBC Sunday Night Theatre ("Berkeley Square"; 1959) (TV) .... Helen Pettigrew
- The Burning Glass (1960) TV episode .... Mary Terriford
- ITV Play of the Week .... Mary Terriford (1 episode, 1960)
- Persuasion (1960) (TV miniseries) .... Anne Elliot
- Armchair Theatre ("Nothing to Pay"; 1962) TV episode
- Our Man at St Mark's TV series
- Out of the Unknown ("Stranger in the Family"; 1965) TV episode .... Margaret Wilson
- The Wednesday Play .... Stella Forty (2 episodes, 1964–66)
- The Big Breaker (1964) TV episode .... Sybil
- Jackanory (5 episodes, 1967; see below):

The Little White Horse: Part 5 ("Out of the Sea"; 1967) ... Storyteller
The Little White Horse: Part 4 ("The Castle in the Pinewoods"; 1967) ... Storyteller
The Little White Horse: Part 3 ("The Iron Sword"; 1967) .... Storyteller
The Little White Horse: Part 2 ("The Ghost of Sir Wrolf"; 1967) ... Storyteller
The Little White Horse: Part 1 ("The Merryweathers of Moonacre"; 1967) ... Storyteller

- The Jazz Age ("Black Exchange"; 1968) TV episode .... Miss Crowe
- Callan ("Jack-on-Top"; 1969) TV episode .... Stella Paxton
- The Gold Robbers ("Account Rendered"; 1969) TV episode .... Mrs. Oscroft
- W. Somerset Maugham ("Virtue"; 1970) TV episode .... Margery Bishop
- Play for Today ("I Can't See My Little Willie"; 1970) TV episode .... Mary Palmer
- Elizabeth R (1971) (TV miniseries) .... Mary I
- Thirty-Minute Theatre ("Footprints"; 1971) TV episode
- ITV Playhouse ([Love Affair"; 1974) TV episode
- Shadows ("The Future Ghost"; 1975) TV episode .... Mrs. Butler
