= Paul Daneman =

English actor (1925–2001)

- Daneman photographed by Anthony Buckley, 1969
- Born: 29 October 1925
- Died: 28 April 2001 (aged 75)
- Occupations: Actor, writer
- Spouse(s): Susan Courtney (m. 1952, divorced) Meredith Kinmont (m. 1965)
- Children: 3

Paul Frederick Daneman (29 October 1925 – 28 April 2001) was an English film, television, and theatre actor.

== Early life ==
Paul Daneman was born in Islington, London. He attended the Haberdashers' Aske's School in Elstree, Hertfordshire, and Sir William Borlase's Grammar School in Marlow, Buckinghamshire, and studied stage design at Reading University where he joined the dramatic society. His passion for the stage ignited during World War II when entertaining troops in the RAF, in which he served with Bomber Command from 1943 until 1947. After the war he abandoned a career as a painter in order to go to RADA.

== Career ==
After training at RADA, Daneman joined Bristol Old Vic, Birmingham Rep, and the Old Vic for four years. At the British premiere in August 1955 he created the role of Vladimir in Waiting For Godot, at the Arts Theatre in Westminster.

Daneman film credits included Time Without Pity (1957), Zulu (1964), How I Won the War (1967) and Oh! What a Lovely War (1969).

Daneman's television credits include: The Adventures of Robin Hood, The Four Just Men, Persuasion, The Edgar Wallace Mystery Theatre, Danger Man, Out of the Unknown, The Saint, Spy Trap, Blake's 7, The Professionals and Rumpole of the Bailey. The BBC's 1960 production An Age of Kings, a fifteen-part drama that combined Shakespeare's histories of the kings of England and presented them in chronological order, featured Daneman as Richard III. In the early 60s he toured West Africa and Australia. From 1968 to 1970 he starred in the ITV sitcom Never a Cross Word.

Daneman played the husband of Wendy Craig in the original series of the BBC sitcom Not in Front of the Children before being replaced by Ronald Hines. He also played Bilbo Baggins in the 1968 BBC Radio dramatisation of J. R. R. Tolkien's The Hobbit. In that same year he appeared in the Sherlock Holmes detective series episode "The Sign of Four" as two brothers with Peter Cushing as Sherlock.

While recovering from a heart attack, Daneman wrote the sitcom Affairs of the Heart. In 1995 Daneman published If I Only Had Wings, a novel inspired by his experiences in the Royal Air Force during World War II.

== Personal life ==
Daneman was married twice. He married his first wife Susan Courtney in 1952, and they adopted a daughter, but divorced. In 1965 he married his second wife, Meredith Kinmont, they had two daughters, including the soprano Sophie Daneman. Meredith, a former student of the Royal Ballet School, was an author and biographer of Dame Margot Fonteyn.

== Death ==
Aged 75, Daneman died in 2001. His body was buried at East Sheen Cemetery in south-west London.

== Filmography ==
Film
Year	Title	Role	Notes
1955	Fun at St. Fanny's	Fudge, the porter	
1956	Peril for the Guy	Professor Picton	
1957	Time Without Pity	Brian Stanford	
1961	The Fourth Square	Henry Adams	
1961	The Clue of the New Pin	Rex Lander	
1962	Locker Sixty-Nine	Frank Griffiths	
1964	Zulu	Sergeant Robert Maxfield	
1967	How I Won the War	Skipper	
1969	Oh! What a Lovely War	Czar Nicholas II	

== See also ==
- Tale Spinners for Children
