= Emma (1972 serial) =

1972 British television drama series

- Based on: Emma by Jane Austen
- Written by: Denis Constanduros
- Directed by: John Glenister
- Starring: Doran Godwin; John Carson
- Country of origin: United Kingdom
- Original language: English
- No. of episodes: 6

Production
- Producer: Martin Lisemore
- Running time: 45 mins per episode

Original release
- Network: BBC2
- Release: 20 July – 24 August 1972

Emma is a six-part television serial adaptation of Jane Austen's 1815 novel Emma by BBC Television that was broadcast in 1972. It was directed by John Glenister.

This dramatisation brings to life Jane Austen's novel Emma, recreating the female character of whom she wrote, "no one but myself could like."

Emma presides over the small provincial world of Highbury with enthusiasm, but often confusing good intentions with self-gratification. Believing that she engineered the marriage of her governess, companion and friend Miss Taylor – she now turns her attention towards making a match for the local vicar Mr Elton and her new protégée Harriet Smith. Her voice of reason, Mr Knightley, has known her since her childhood and watches her with equal amusement and anger as she learns from the lives of various characters.

== Cast and crew ==
- Doran Godwin – Emma Woodhouse
- John Carson – George Knightley
- Donald Eccles – Mr Woodhouse
- Constance Chapman – Miss Bates
- Robert East – Frank Churchill
- Ania Marson – Jane Fairfax
- Ellen Dryden – Mrs Weston
- Raymond Adamson – Mr Weston
- Fiona Walker – Mrs Elton
- Timothy Peters – Mr Elton
- Debbie Bowen – Harriet Smith
- John Alkin – Robert Martin
- Mary Holder – Mrs Bates
- Vivienne Moore – Williams
- Amber Thomas – Patty
- Hilda Fenemore – Mrs Cole
- Norman Atkyns – Shop Assistant
- Meg Gleed – Isabella Knightley
- John Kelland – John Knightley
- Belinda Tighe, Yves Tighe, Arran Tighe, Emma Horton – The Knightley Children
- Mollie Sugden – Mrs Goddard
- Lala Lloyd – Mrs Ford
- Marian Tanner – Betty Bickerton
- Sam Williams – Gypsy Boy
- Tom McCall, David Butt, Christopher Green – Musicians
