= Emma (2009 serial) =

British television costume drama series

- Genre: Costume drama
- Based on: Emma by Jane Austen
- Written by: Sandy Welch
- Directed by: Jim O'Hanlon
- Starring: Romola Garai; Jonny Lee Miller; Michael Gambon; Tamsin Greig; Rupert Evans; Robert Bathurst; Jodhi May; Louise Dylan; Blake Ritson; Christina Cole; Laura Pyper
- Composer: Samuel Sim
- Country of origin: United Kingdom
- Original language: English
- No. of episodes: 4

Production
- Executive producer: Phillippa Giles
- Producer: George Ormond
- Running time: 57 minutes

Original release
- Network: BBC One
- Release: 4 October – 25 October 2009

Emma is a four-part BBC television drama serial adaptation of Jane Austen's 1815 novel Emma. The episodes were written by Sandy Welch, writer of previous BBC costume dramas Jane Eyre and North & South, and directed by Jim O'Hanlon. The serial stars Romola Garai as the titular heroine Emma Woodhouse, Jonny Lee Miller as her loyal lifelong friend Mr Knightley, and Michael Gambon as Emma's father, Mr Woodhouse. The serial originally ran weekly on Sunday nights on BBC One from 4 to 25 October 2009.

Critical reception to the series was generally positive, especially the first episode, with many of the main actors being praised. Later episodes attracted fewer viewers, and some critics felt that the initial tone was not maintained; alternatively, the lower figures may have been due to a scheduling conflict with the very popular X Factor on ITV1.

== Cast and characters ==
- Romola Garai as Emma Woodhouse: Emma has no need to marry, being financially independent, but delights in matchmaking those around her — and credits herself with being very good at it – despite her friend Mr Knightley's scepticism.
- Jonny Lee Miller as Mr George Knightley: Mr Knightley is Emma's only social and intellectual equal in Highbury, living at Donwell Abbey, a rambling country estate a short walk from Hartfield. His brother is married to Emma's older sister. He has known Emma since she was born, and there is an easy familiarity between them. He is an individualistic man, quick-witted, with a dry sense of humour — often used in sparring with Emma. But he also has a strong moral compass — and at times he strongly disagrees with Emma over her behaviour.
- Michael Gambon as Mr Woodhouse: Mr Woodhouse, Emma's father, lost his wife when his two daughters were very young, and he has developed an extremely nervous disposition. He is loving and kind, but he worries constantly. He hardly ever leaves Hartfield, and he hates the thought of Emma ever leaving him. He sees the marriages of Isabella, Emma’s older sister, to Mr John Knightley, and Miss Taylor, Emma’s beloved governess, to Mr Weston, as disruptions to the life he has led with them.
- Louise Dylan as Harriet Smith: Harriet is a parlour boarder at Mrs Goddard's School. She has been sent there by her anonymous father to be educated, because Harriet is his "natural" (illegitimate) daughter. Being a parlour boarder means that she has stayed on at the school to help with the younger girls. She is pretty but not very bright, and she has little prospect of marrying a gentleman. Emma, however, is sure that Harriet's father must be a gentleman and takes her under her wing.
- Jodhi May as Anne Taylor/Weston: Anne has been Emma's governess since her mother died when Emma was a baby. More like an older sister than a governess, Anne is wise and caring, and devoted to Emma.. When she marries Mr Weston, she is worried about leaving Emma at Hartfield with only her father for company.
- Robert Bathurst as Mr Weston: Mr Weston is an eternal optimist, despite the fact that his life has not always run smoothly. He married young, to a woman who spent all his money, who was disowned by her family, and then died, leaving him with a young son, Frank. He agreed to Frank being adopted by his wife's estranged sister, who insisted that Frank change his name to Frank Churchill. Frank has lived in the lap of luxury ever since.
- Rupert Evans as Frank Churchill: Frank is a ball of energy, charming and mischievous. He has been kept at his aunt's beck and call for most of his life, and often seems to be called back to her bedside whenever he ventures away — although it is never entirely clear whether this is just a convenient excuse for not visiting Highbury and his father.
- Laura Pyper as Jane Fairfax: Jane's parents died when she was a toddler. Her aunt, Miss Bates, and grandmother, Mrs Bates, sent her from Highbury to live with the Campbells, who could offer greater advantages. Colonel Campbell knew she would be a good companion for his only daughter, Miss Campbell. Ever since, Jane has excelled at everything a girl should, and Miss Bates has bored and irritated Emma by recounting Jane's virtues at every opportunity. Now Jane has reached the age where she must leave the Campbells, return to Highbury, and find means to make a living as a governess.
- Tamsin Greig as Miss Bates: Miss Bates is the daughter of the former vicar of Highbury, who died many years ago. Without a husband to provide an income, she faces ever-increasing poverty. Despite her woes, Miss Bates has a perennially cheerful disposition. She fills any silence with incessant talk.
- Valerie Lilley as Mrs Bates: Whereas Miss Bates talks without ceasing, her aged mother, Mrs Bates, hardly ever speaks. She sits silent in the corner of the room, or is wheeled from place to place by Miss Bates.
- Blake Ritson as Mr Elton: Mr Elton is the vicar of Highbury, a dashing young man, aware of his status in the village and his eligibility. He aims at an advantageous marriage.
- Christina Cole as Augusta Elton: Mrs Elton is rich, and a good catch for Mr Elton in many ways. However she is also vulgar and interfering, and one-upmanship is second nature to her. She arrives in Highbury keen to prove her social standing.
- Dan Fredenburgh as John Knightley
- Poppy Miller as Isabella Knightley
- Jefferson Hall as Robert Martin
- Veronica Roberts as Mrs Goddard
- Liza Sadovy as Mrs Cole
- Eileen O'Higgins as Miss Martin 1
- Sarah Ovens as Miss Martin 2
- Susie Trayling as Mrs Churchill
- Frank Doody as Mr Dixon
- Amy Loughton as Miss Campbell / Mrs Dixon

== Production ==
Principal photography commenced with a four-day shoot in the Kent village of Chilham from 14 to 18 April 2009. Production design staff covered several roads with gravel to disguise the 21st-century road markings, and erected a fountain in the village square. Filming occurred from 8 a.m. to 7 p.m. every day and was scheduled to coincide with the Easter school holiday to minimise local disruption.

Filming continued at the parish church of St. Mary the Virgin in Send, Surrey on 24 and 28 April, where scenes of a wedding and a Sunday service were completed.

Further filming took place at Squerryes Court, Westerham, Kent, which was used as Hartfield and also where many interior scenes were shot.

The scene that shows Emma and Harriet Smith on their way to visit the poor was filmed in Hatfield, Hertfordshire, England. The church they pass along the wooded path is St Etheldreda's Church, Hatfield.

Leith Hill in Surrey stood in for Box Hill as the setting for the picnic, which was repeated for the 2020 movie adaptation.

== Episodes and plot ==
No.	Title	Directed by	Written by	Original release date	UK viewers (millions)
1	"Episode One"	Jim O'Hanlon	Sandy Welch	4 October 2009	4.84
Rich, independent and kind-spirited, nothing delights Emma Woodhouse more than matchmaking. Once she has credited herself with marrying off her former governess, Anne Taylor, to Mr Weston, she attempts to match her new friend, Harriet Smith, to Mr Elton, the ambitious local vicar. Emma persuades Harriet to refuse a marriage proposal from Robert Martin, a respectable young farmer. Emma's life-long friend Mr Knightley disapproves of her activities.
2	"Episode Two"	Jim O'Hanlon	Sandy Welch	11 October 2009	4.12
Emma continues her attempts to marry off Harriet and Mr Elton. Although uninterested in marriage herself, she is intrigued by the mysterious and elusive Frank Churchill, Mr Weston's son, whom she hopes to meet for the first time at the Westons' Christmas party. Frank, however, does not arrive, detained at home by his controlling aunt. Mr Elton mistakenly believes Emma is in love with him, and proposes marriage. Emma is horrified, and when she tells him she believed him to be attached to Harriet, he is outraged, considering Harriet socially inferior. Harriet is heartbroken. When Frank Churchill arrives at last, Emma finds him charming and easy-going. Emma's impecunious and garrulous friend Miss Bates receives a visit from her niece, Jane Fairfax, who is to become a governess. A large piano arrives for Jane, sent by an anonymous admirer, amid much speculation about the donor.
3	"Episode Three"	Jim O'Hanlon	Sandy Welch	18 October 2009	3.32
Frank and Emma arrange a ball at the Crown inn. Emma finds herself forced to include Mr Elton, who has just returned from a six-week visit to Bath with a pretentious, nouveau-riche wife. During the first dance, Harriet lacks a partner, and when it is suggested to Mr Elton that he should ask her to dance, he rudely cuts her. Seeing this, Mr Knightley asks her himself. With her matchmaking now abandoned, Emma feels cooped-up and bored, and Mr Knightley suggests a day trip to Box Hill, a local beauty spot, for a change of scene. He also tells Emma that he suspects Frank and Jane to be secretly in love. Emma scoffs and says that she can personally vouch for Frank's indifference to Jane, leaving Mr Knightley feeling hurt at Emma's indifference towards him.
4	"Episode Four"	Jim O'Hanlon	Sandy Welch	25 October 2009	3.66
The picnic at Box Hill goes badly. Emma and Frank flirt, and Emma thoughtlessly insults Miss Bates, joking about her inability to stop talking. Jane, too, looks angry, as does Mr Knightley. Scolded by Mr Knightley, Emma is ashamed. She tries to reconcile with Jane and Miss Bates, but Jane will not see her; Miss Bates tells her that Jane cried all night and has now accepted a job as a governess. Mr Knightley unexpectedly announces that he must go to London and that he will be away for a while. Meanwhile, Frank visits his aunt, who dies soon after his arrival. Freed from his aunt's influence, Frank reveals that he and Jane have been secretly engaged for some months, long before both came to Highbury. Emma seeks to console Harriet, believing due to a misunderstanding that she is in love with Frank, only to learn that Mr Knightley is in fact the object of Harriet's love, and that she believes her love to be reciprocated. Emma is startled and realises, perhaps too late, that she is also in love with Mr Knightley. When Mr Knightley returns, he consoles Emma about Frank's engagement, thinking her heartbroken. When she admits her foolishness, he proposes, and she accepts. Frank and Jane marry, and Harriet accepts Robert Martin. Finally, Emma and Mr Knightley are wed.

== Critical reception ==
Reviewing the first episode, Sam Wollaston of The Guardian called it "very good... even if it's not necessary", wishing the BBC would adapt some lesser-known novels rather than churning out the same adaptations again and again. He nevertheless praised the acting, suggesting Garai's "eyes alone deserve a BAFTA" and that Michael Gambon made "a splendid old Mr Woodhouse".

John Preston of The Telegraph also noted Romola Garai as "particularly good" in the titular role, and noted that while Jim O Hanlon's direction was perhaps a little too "steady and sure" there was still "plenty of sprightliness there too". After the third episode of the series, however, he wrote that "[it] was a disaster, becoming ever more coarse and clumsy as it went on. The narration was obtrusive, the charm next to non-existent and the secondary characters insufficiently delineated." Emma he deemed "too bovine, too cocksure" in order for her to be truly in doubt. He did not find that Jonny Lee Miller, "who could have been a first-class Mr Knightley, was given enough screen time to make an impact". He concluded: "Contrivance ha[d] taken over. Sprightliness ha[d] disappeared. The soufflé ha[d] fallen."

Tom Sutcliffe of The Independent wrote in a review that "the primary-colour brightness seems to have carried over into some the performances." He found that Garai "[did]n't capture the sense of frustrated intelligence that makes Emma bearable on the page", but blamed the script for it. He also saw a casting problem with Emma and Knightley in the sense that Miller "still carrie[d] too much of the seductive bad boy about him" so that he was not convincing as a "surprising love object", and "that threatens one of the novel's great achievements, which is to educate us alongside its heroine."

Some critics also noted the dip in ratings following the first episode. In The Independent, Jonathon Brown observed that while "the critics have given it a qualified nod of approval" the second instalment of the serial "pulled in only 3.5 million viewers – down nearly 1 million on the opening episode the previous week – while the third episode saw another 200,000 switch off". He suggests this may be due to the "13 million-strong audience from ITV1's all-conquering X Factor" which had launched a Sunday night results show for the first time, or that "the days of bonnet and bustle are [simply] over".

=== Accolades ===
Award	Category	Recipients and nominees	Result
Golden Globes	Best Performance by an Actress in a Mini-Series or a Motion Picture Made for Television	Romola Garai	Nominated
Primetime Emmy Awards	Outstanding Hairstyling for a Miniseries or a Movie	Anne Oldham	Won
Primetime Emmy Awards	Outstanding Casting for a Miniseries, Movie or a Special	Gemma Hancock (casting director), Sam Stevenson (casting director)	Nominated
Primetime Emmy Awards	Outstanding Costumes for a Miniseries, Movie or a Special	Rosalind Ebbutt (costume designer), Amanda Keable (costume supervisor)	Nominated
Primetime Emmy Awards	Outstanding Supporting Actor in a Miniseries or a Movie	Michael Gambon	Nominated
Royal Television Society	Best Music, Original Score	Samuel Sim	Nominated
Satellite Awards	Best Miniseries	Emma	Nominated
Shanghai Television Festival	Magnolia Award for Best Television Film or Miniseries	Emma	Nominated

== Soundtrack ==
The original soundtrack with music composed by Samuel Sim was released on 8 December 2009 and features numerous themes featured in the series, including music from the dance sequences during the ball at the Crown Inn. A track listing for the album is as follows:

1. "Emma Main Titles"
2. "Emma Woodhouse Was Borne"
3. "Expansion Project"
4. "Rescued from the Gypsies"
5. "A Ball"
6. "Knightley's Walk"
7. "Dolls"
8. "The World Has Left Us Behind"
9. "Arrival of Little Knightley"
10. "Donwell Dancing Again"
11. "Superior Men"
12. "Matchmaker"
13. "Walk of Shame"
14. "Playing Harriet"
15. "Without Suspicion"
16. "Frank Is Free"
17. "Mr Elton"
18. "Blind Endeavours"
19. "The Last Dance"
20. "Lost and Found"
21. "Only People We Like"
22. "The Ship's Cook"
23. "Cliff Tops"
24. "Secrets"
25. "It's Snowing and Heavily"
26. "The Seaside"
27. "Love Story"
28. "Most Ardently In Love"
