= Emma (1996 theatrical film) =

1996 film by Douglas McGrath

- Theatrical release poster
- Directed by: Douglas McGrath
- Screenplay by: Douglas McGrath
- Based on: Emma; 1816 novel by Jane Austen
- Produced by: Steven Haft; Patrick Cassavetti
- Starring: Gwyneth Paltrow; Toni Collette; Alan Cumming; Ewan McGregor; Jeremy Northam; Greta Scacchi; Juliet Stevenson; Polly Walker
- Cinematography: Ian Wilson
- Edited by: Lesley Walker
- Music by: Rachel Portman
- Production companies: Matchmaker Films; Haft Entertainment
- Distributed by: Miramax Films (United States); Buena Vista International (United Kingdom)
- Release dates: 7 June 1996 (Seattle International Film Festival); 2 August 1996 (United States); 13 September 1996 (United Kingdom)
- Running time: 120 minutes
- Countries: United Kingdom; United States
- Language: English
- Budget: $7 million
- Box office: $37.3 million

Emma is a 1996 British-American period comedy film based on the 1815 novel by Jane Austen. Written and directed by Douglas McGrath, and produced by Patrick Cassavetti and Steven Haft, the film stars Gwyneth Paltrow, Alan Cumming, Toni Collette, Ewan McGregor, and Jeremy Northam.

The film follows a young 19th-century English woman named Emma Woodhouse who, while matchmaking for friends and neighbours, nearly misses her chance at love.

The film was first released on 7 June 1996 on the Seattle International Film Festival, and then was theatrically released on 2 August 1996 by Miramax Films in the United States, and on 13 September 1996 in the United Kingdom. It received positive reviews from critics and grossed $37.3 million worldwide at the box office.

== Plot ==
In early 19th-century England, Emma Woodhouse is a spirited, proud young woman of wealth and high rank who fancies herself worldlier than merited by her limited life experience. After her governess, Miss Taylor, marries Mr Weston, Emma proudly takes credit for bringing the couple together and now considers herself a matchmaker within her small community. Her father and an intimate family friend, George Knightley, whose brother is married to Emma's sister, dispute her naive assumption that she knows who among her acquaintance should be paired. Though acknowledging good intentions, they discourage any further matchmaking attempts. Ignoring their warnings, she schemes to match Mr Elton, the haughty village clergyman with social aspirations, with her new friend, Harriet Smith, a good-natured young woman from a local farming family of genteel but low rank in society.

Robert Martin, a respectable local farmer, proposes to Harriet, who is infatuated with Martin and inclined to accept. Believing Harriet can have better prospects, Emma urges her to refuse him. Knightley warns Emma not to interfere, asserting that Martin is a young man of higher status than Harriet can reasonably expect. Disregarding Knightley's reasoning, Emma moves forward with her matchmaking scheme. Meanwhile, Mr Elton has aspirations toward Emma herself, flattering her by excessively admiring her watercolour portrait of Harriet and otherwise fawning over Emma. Never thinking that a clergyman would aspire to her high-born self, Emma mistakenly interprets Elton's attentions to herself as ways of advancing his interest in Harriet through her mentor. When Elton fervently declares his love to Emma, however, she is taken aback and strongly rejects him. Emma's rejection and assumption that he should court Harriet, who Elton believes beneath him, offends Elton, who subsequently attempts to humble Emma whenever the opportunity arises. Soon afterwards, he marries a vain socialite who competes with Emma for status within the community.

Mr Weston's son, the handsome and dashing Frank Churchill, visits from London, charming Emma and the community with his graceful manners. Though Frank is attentive to Emma, she nevertheless determines to match him with Harriet as consolation for Elton's rejection. However, it is later revealed that Frank is secretly engaged to Jane Fairfax, a beautiful but impoverished young gentlewoman who has been reduced to supporting herself as a paid companion. Emma expresses unreasonable dislike for Jane for the very maturity and cleverness that make Jane universally admired among the locals. Frank's financial prospects hinge on an inheritance from his aunt, who would disapprove of the match and disinherit him because of Jane's lack of fortune and social status. After this aunt dies, Frank announces his engagement to Jane, revealing that his feigned interest in Emma was a deflection. Emma is more offended at Frank's disregard for her matchmaking with Harriet than is Harriet herself, who states she has no interest in Frank, preferring Knightley. The gallant Knightley had "rescued" Harriet by dancing with her at a ball after Elton had blatantly snubbed her. It is subsequently revealed that Knightley has secretly been in love with Emma, his sister-in-law, who regards him as a brother who often criticises her high-handedness.

During a country picnic, Emma's gauche attempt at wit ridicules the loquaciousness of the impoverished Miss Bates, deeply hurting her. After Knightley scolds her, Emma works to make amends with Miss Bates to regain Knightley's approval. Before Frank's secret engagement to Jane is revealed, Knightley mistakenly believes Emma is in love with the markedly attentive Frank and distances himself by visiting his brother and Emma's sister. During his absence, Emma frequently thinks about Knightley, but does not realise she loves Knightley until Harriet expresses her own infatuation with him.

When Knightley returns, he and Emma meet and have a conversation that begins awkwardly, with Emma asserting that she has not been devastated by Frank's engagement to Jane. It ends with Knightley's admitting his love and proposing to Emma; she gladly accepts his proposal. Their engagement upsets Harriet, who for a time avoids Emma, but she returns a few weeks later, happily engaged to Martin, whom she always loved. All concerned attend Emma and Knightley's wedding.

== Cast ==
- Gwyneth Paltrow as Emma Woodhouse
- Toni Collette as Harriet Smith
- Alan Cumming as Philip Elton
- Ewan McGregor as Frank Churchill
- Jeremy Northam as George Knightley
- Greta Scacchi as Anne Taylor Weston
- Juliet Stevenson as Augusta Hawkins Elton
- Polly Walker as Jane Fairfax
- Sophie Thompson as Miss Bates
- James Cosmo as Mr Weston
- Denys Hawthorne as Henry Woodhouse
- Phyllida Law as Mrs Bates
- Kathleen Byron as Mrs Goddard
- Edward Woodall as Robert Martin
- Brian Capron as John Knightley
- Karen Westwood as Isabella Woodhouse
- Angela Down as Mrs Cole
- John Franklyn-Robbins as Mr Cole
- Ruth Jones as Bates' maid

== Production ==
=== Conception and adaptation ===
Douglas McGrath "fell in love" with Jane Austen's 1815 novel Emma, while he was an undergraduate at Princeton University. He believed the book would make a great film, but it was not until a decade later that he was given a chance to work on the idea. After receiving an Academy Award nomination in 1995 for his work on Bullets over Broadway, McGrath decided to make the most of the moment and took his script idea for a film adaptation of Emma to Miramax Films. McGrath had initially wanted to write a modern version of the novel, set on the Upper East Side of New York City. Miramax's co-chairman, Harvey Weinstein, liked the idea of a contemporary take on the novel. McGrath was unaware that Amy Heckerling's Clueless was already in production until plans for Emma were well underway.

=== Casting ===
McGrath decided to bring in American actress Gwyneth Paltrow to audition for Emma Woodhouse, after a suggestion from his agent and after seeing her performance in Flesh and Bone. Of his decision to bring Paltrow in for the part, McGrath revealed "The thing that actually sold me on her playing a young English girl was that she did a perfect Texas accent. I know that wouldn't recommend her to most people. I grew up in Texas, and I have never heard an actor or actress not from Texas sound remotely like a real Texan. I knew she had theater training, so she could carry herself. We had many actresses, big and small, who wanted to play this part. The minute she started the read-through, the very first line, I thought, 'Everything is going to be fine; she's going to be brilliant.'" Following the read-through, the co-chairman of Miramax, Harvey Weinstein, decided to give Emma the green-light. However, he wanted Paltrow to appear in The Pallbearer first, before going ahead and allowing the film to be made. While she recovered from wisdom-tooth surgery, Paltrow had a month to herself to do her own research for the part. She also studied horsemanship, dancing, singing, archery and the "highly stylized" manners and dialect during a three-week rehearsal period.

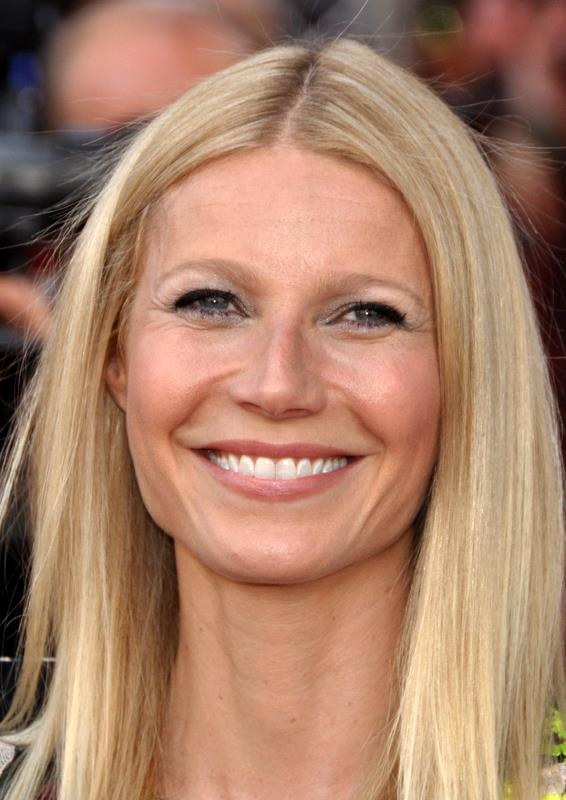
Gwyneth Paltrow was picked by the director to portray Emma Woodhouse.

Jeremy Northam revealed that when he first tried to read Emma, he did not get very far and was not a fan. When he read the script for the film, he was initially considered for another role, but he wanted to play George Knightley. He stated "When I met the director, we got on very well and we talked about everything except the film. At the end of it, he said he thought Knightley was the part for me, so I didn't have to bring up the issue at all." Northam added that Knightley's faith in Emma becoming a better person was one of the reasons he loved the character. Australian actress Toni Collette was cast as Harriet Smith. Collette also struggled to get into the Austen books when she was younger, but after reading Emma, which she deemed "warm and witty and clever", she began to appreciate them more. Collette had to gain weight to portray "the Rubenesque Harriet" and she explained "I think it's important for people to look real in films. There's a tendency to go Barbie doll and I don't agree with that at all."

Ewan McGregor was cast as Frank Churchill. He told Adam Higginbotham from The Guardian that he chose to star in Emma because he thought it would be something different from his previous role in Trainspotting. McGregor later regretted appearing in the film, saying "My decision-making was wrong. It's the only time I've done that. And I learnt from it, you know. So I'm glad of that – because it was early on and I learnt my lesson. It's a good film, Emma, but I'm just... not very good in it. I'm not helped because I'm also wearing the world's worst wig. It's quite a laugh, checking that wig out." Real-life mother and daughter, Phyllida Law and Sophie Thompson, portrayed Mrs and Miss Bates. Thompson revealed that it was a coincidence that she and her mother were cast alongside each other, as the casting director had their names on separate lists. McGrath initially believed Thompson to be too young to play Miss Bates, but he changed his mind after seeing her wearing glasses with her hair down.

Alan Cumming appeared as Reverend Philip Elton, who falls in love with Emma. Cumming wrote on his official website that the friendship that developed between himself and McGrath was one of the most memorable things about his time working on the film. He went on to state that the worst thing about the shoot was his hair, which had been lightened and curled for the character. Juliet Stevenson portrayed the "ghastly" Mrs Elton, while Polly Walker and Greta Scacchi starred as Jane Fairfax and Anne Taylor respectively. Other cast members included Edward Woodall as Robert Martin, James Cosmo as Mr Weston and Denys Hawthorne as Mr Woodhouse, in one of his last film appearances.

=== Costume design ===
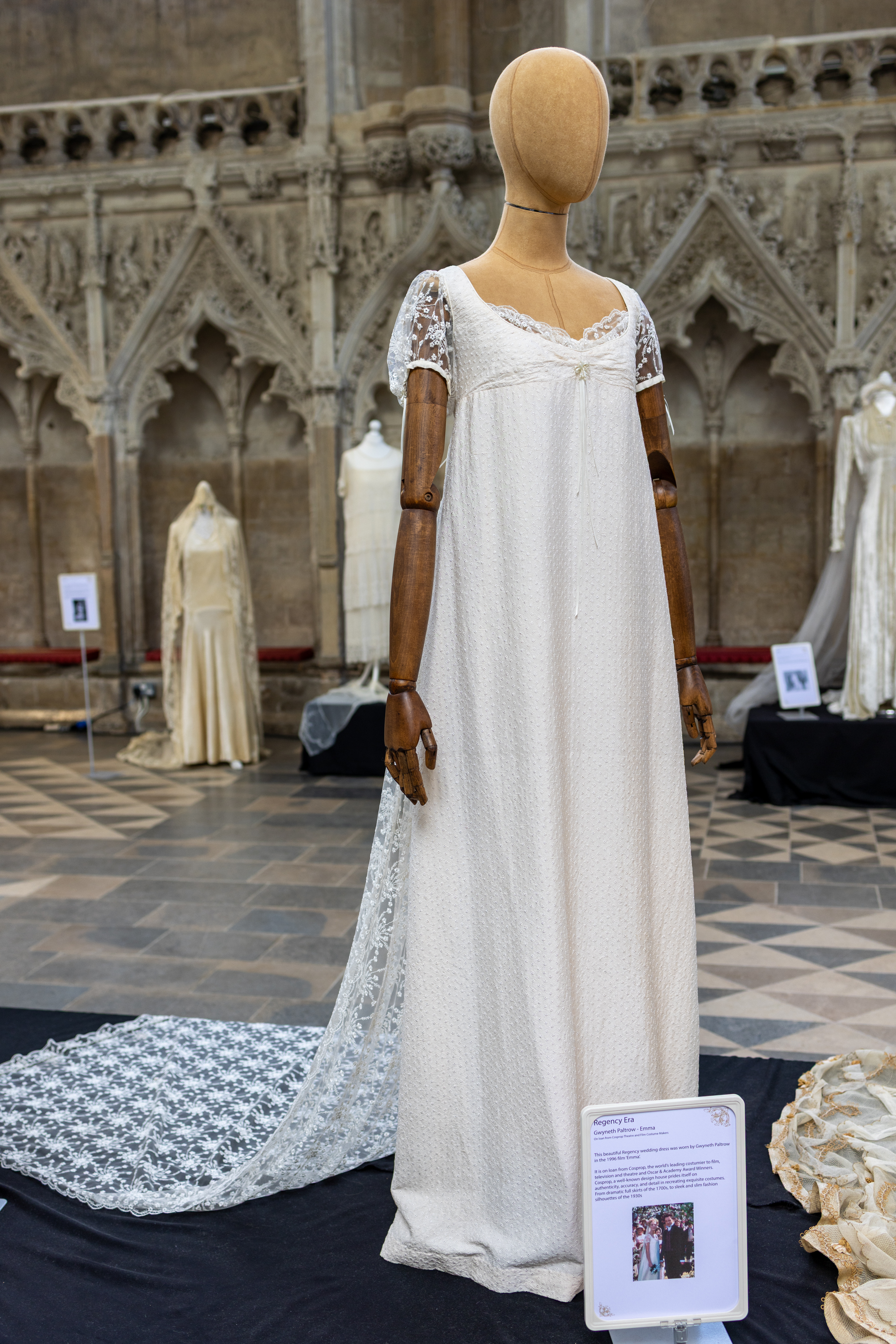
Emma's wedding dress created by Ruth Myers

British costume designer Ruth Myers created and designed the clothing for the film. She wanted to mirror the lightness of the script within the costumes and give "a spark of color and life" to the early 19th century setting. During her research, Myers noted a similarity between the fashions after the Napoleonic Wars and the 1920s, saying that they had "the same sort of flapperish quality". The designer explained "The moment I set to research it, more and more it kept striking me what the similarities were between the two periods. It was a period of freedom of costume for women, and it was a period of constant diversions for the upper classes–picnics, dinners, balls, dances. What I wanted to do was make it look like the watercolors of the period, which are very bright and very clear, with very specific colors."

Myers went on to reveal that she did not want the costumes to have a "heavy English look" and instead she wanted "to get the freedom of bodies that you see in all the drawings, the form of the body underneath, the swell of the breasts." Myers told Barbara De Witt from the Los Angeles Daily News that using pastel-coloured clothing to get the watercolour effect was one of her major challenges during the production. The designer was later criticised for being inaccurate, but she stated that she did not want the costumes to look old or sepia. Myers only had five weeks in which to create 150 costumes for the production, and she was constantly working on the set.

Emma's wedding dress was made from silk crepe and embroidered with a small sprig pattern, while the sleeves and the train were made from embroidered net. Of the dress, Myers stated "The inspiration for Emma's wedding dress began with a small amount of exquisite vintage lace that became the overlay. I wanted a look that would work not only for the period but also one that would compliment [sic] Gwyneth Paltrow's youth, swan neck, and incredible beauty. I was also hoping to evoke happiness and the English countryside; the sun did shine on the day we shot the scene!"

=== Music ===
The musical score of the film was written by British composer Rachel Portman. It was released on 29 July 1996 by Hollywood Records. On 24 March 1997, Portman became the first woman to win the Academy Award for Best Original Score. The album contains 18 tracks; the first track is "Main Titles", and the final track is "End Titles".

== Comparisons with the novel ==
Although in general staying close to the plot of the book, the screenplay by Douglas McGrath enlivens the banter between the staid Mr Knightley and the vivacious Emma, making the basis of their attraction more apparent.

Austen's original novel deals with Emma's false sense of class superiority, for which she is eventually chastised. In an essay from Jane Austen in Hollywood, Nora Nachumi writes that, due partly to Paltrow's star status, Emma appears less humbled by the end of this film than she does in the novel.

== Reception ==
=== Critical response ===
The film has received generally positive reviews from critics. Rotten Tomatoes gives the film an approval rating of 84% based on reviews from 57 critics, with a rating average of 7.2/10. The consensus writes: "Emma marks an auspicious debut for writer-director Douglas McGrath, making the most of its Jane Austen source material – and a charming performance from Gwyneth Paltrow." Metacritic gives the film a rating of 66 out of 100 based on reviews from 23 critics, indicating "generally favorable reviews".

Ken Eisner, writing for Variety, proclaimed "Gwyneth Paltrow shines brightly as Jane Austen's most endearing character, the disastrously self-assured matchmaker Emma Woodhouse. A fine cast, speedy pacing and playful direction make this a solid contender for the Austen sweepstakes."

=== Box office ===
The film grossed $22.2 million in the United States and Canada, £5 million in the United Kingdom and $37.3 million worldwide.

== Accolades ==
Award	Date of the ceremony	Category	Recipients	Result	Ref.
Southeastern Film Critics Association	19 December 1996	Best Film	Emma	9th place	
USC Scripter Award	8 February 1997	USC Scripter Award	Douglas McGrath (screenplay), Jane Austen (novel)	Nominated	
Satellite Awards	15 January 1997	Best Actress in a Motion Picture	Gwyneth Paltrow	Won	
London Film Critics' Circle	2 March 1997	British Actor of the Year	Ewan McGregor (also for Brassed Off, The Pillow Book and Trainspotting)	Won	
Writers Guild of America Awards	16 March 1997	Best Adapted Screenplay	Douglas McGrath	Nominated	
Academy Awards	24 March 1997	Best Original Musical or Comedy Score	Rachel Portman	Won	
Academy Awards	24 March 1997	Best Costume Design	Ruth Myers	Nominated	

== Home media ==
In the United States, Miramax Home Entertainment released the film on VHS and LaserDisc on April, 23, 1997. On May, 12, 1997 it received a Japanese LaserDisc release, with a Taiwanese LaserDisc release occurring in 1997 as well. The U.S. DVD release followed on 5 January 1999.

In 2010, Miramax was sold by The Walt Disney Company (their owners since 1993), with the studio being taken over by private equity firm Filmyard Holdings that same year. Filmyard sublicensed the home media rights for several Miramax titles to Lionsgate. On 26 April 2011, Lionsgate Home Entertainment reissued the film on DVD

Filmyard Holdings sold Miramax to Qatari company beIN Media Group during March 2016. In April 2020, ViacomCBS (now known as Paramount Skydance) acquired the rights to Miramax's library, after buying a 49% stake in the studio from beIN. Emma was one of the 700 titles Paramount acquired in the deal. Afterwards, Paramount began reissuing many Miramax titles. On 22 September 2020, Paramount Home Entertainment released a four film DVD set which included Emma and three other Miramax-produced Gwyneth Paltrow films (Shakespeare in Love, Bounce and View from the Top). They also issued the film on a two-disc double feature DVD with Shakespeare in Love on 23 February 2021, and reissued Emma as a stand-alone Blu-ray and DVD on 16 August 2021. The film was made available on Paramount's subscription streaming service Paramount+, as well as on its free streaming service Pluto TV. In Australia, it was also on the streaming service for the Paramount-owned broadcaster Network 10.

== See also ==
- "Silent Worship" (song sung by Emma and Mr Churchill)
- Emma – 2020 film
