= Silent Worship =

1928 arrangement of a 1728 aria

The song "Silent Worship" is a 1928 English-language adaptation for voice and piano by Arthur Somervell of Alessandro's aria "Non lo dirò col labbro" from Handel's 1728 opera Tolomeo (Ptolemy). It is the ninth song in Somervell's collection Ten Songs of Handel (8) and Giovanni Bononcini (2). Other arrangements of Somervell's translation include voice accompanied by a symphony orchestra, and unison choir.

== Handel / Somervell comparison ==
Musically Arthur Somervell's song is a simple arrangement of the original Handel aria – with the orchestral parts reduced for piano, one or two slight changes in harmony, and the instrumental ending (postlude) omitted.

The text is treated quite differently in the two versions:

- In the original Italian baroque aria as set by Handel, the first part of the aria uses a single couplet to express a single two-fold thought: "I will not say it with my lips, they do not have the courage". The words are repeated several times, to emphasize the lack of courage. The second part of the aria expresses a complement to the first, its antithesis – twice as many words for half as much music – and therefore not repeated: "Perhaps, with sparks from yearning eyes, my gaze will speak to reveal how I am consumed by flames". The first part of the aria is then repeated, in A–B–A da capo aria form.
- Somervell's unrelated English text consists of a 16-line narrative, in which only a single line is repeated. Even the da capo – the reprise of the first part at the end – has a new paraphrase of the first text rather than the simple verbatim repetition which the baroque aria uses.

== Popular culture ==
"Silent Worship" is featured in the 1996 film adaptation of Jane Austen's novel Emma, where it is sung by Gwyneth Paltrow (as Emma) and Ewan McGregor (as Frank Churchill). Somervell's English adaptation was done more than a century after Austen's 1815 novel, but the original Italian aria was recorded in Jane Austen's own handwritten songbooks. In the film, Somervell's piano introduction to the song is shortened.

== "Silent Worship" ==
Did you not hear my lady
Go down the garden singing?
Blackbird and thrush were silent
To hear the alleys ringing.

Oh saw you not my lady
Out in the garden there?
Shaming the rose and lily
For she is twice as fair.

Though I am nothing to her
Though she must rarely look at me
And though I could never woo her
I love her till I die.

Surely you heard my lady
Go down the garden singing?
Silencing all the songbirds
And setting the alleys ringing.

But surely you see my lady
Out in the garden there,
Rivaling the glittering sunshine
With a glory of golden hair.

== "Non lo dirò col labbro" ==
Allessandro's cavatina in act 1 of Tolomeo:

Non lo dirò col labbro
Che tanto ardir non hà.

Forse con le faville
Dell'avide pupille,
Per dir come tutt'ardo,
Lo sguardo parlerà.

I won’t say it with my lips—
they don’t have such boldness.

Perhaps with the sparks
of my longing eyes,
to show how completely I burn,
my gaze will speak instead.
