= Emma (2020 film) =

2020 film by Autumn de Wilde

Emma.
- Theatrical release poster
- Directed by: Autumn de Wilde
- Screenplay by: Eleanor Catton
- Based on: Emma; 1815 novel by Jane Austen
- Produced by: Tim Bevan; Eric Fellner; Graham Broadbent; Pete Czernin
- Starring: Anya Taylor-Joy; Johnny Flynn; Josh O'Connor; Callum Turner; Mia Goth; Miranda Hart; Bill Nighy
- Cinematography: Christopher Blauvelt
- Edited by: Nick Emerson
- Music by: David Schweitzer; Isobel Waller-Bridge
- Production companies: Perfect World Pictures; Working Title Films; Blueprint Pictures
- Distributed by: Focus Features; (United States); Universal Pictures; (international)
- Release dates: 14 February 2020 (United Kingdom); 21 February 2020 (United States)
- Running time: 124 minutes
- Countries: United Kingdom; United States
- Language: English
- Budget: $10 million
- Box office: $28.9 million

Emma (stylised as Emma.) is a 2020 period romantic comedy film directed by Autumn de Wilde, from a screenplay by Eleanor Catton, based on the 1815 novel by Jane Austen. It stars Anya Taylor-Joy as Miss Emma Woodhouse, a wealthy and elegant young woman living with her father in Regency-era England who amuses herself with matchmaking and meddles in the romantic lives of those closest to her. The film also stars Johnny Flynn, Josh O'Connor, Callum Turner, Mia Goth, Miranda Hart, and Bill Nighy.

Produced by Perfect World Pictures, Working Title Films and Blueprint Pictures, a film adaptation of Austen's novel by Focus Features began development in October 2018 when Taylor-Joy was cast in the title role, with de Wilde attached as the director. The remainder of the supporting roles were cast by March 2019. Principal photography took place between March and June 2019 across England.

Emma was released in the United Kingdom on 14 February 2020, and in the United States on 21 February 2020 by Universal Pictures. It received generally favourable reviews, with the performances and production design singled out for praise. It grossed $27.4 million worldwide against its budget of $10 million. The film received two Academy Award nominations for Best Costume Design and Best Makeup and Hairstyling at the 93rd Academy Awards, as well as a Best Costume Design nomination at the 74th British Academy Film Awards, three nominations at the 26th Critics' Choice Awards, and a Golden Globe Award for Best Actress – Motion Picture Comedy or Musical nomination (for Taylor-Joy) at the 78th Golden Globe Awards.

== Plot ==
In Regency England, the wealthy and beautiful 20-year-old Emma Woodhouse lives with her widowed father at his Hartfield estate in the fictional Surrey village of Highbury. A frequent visitor to Hartfield is George Knightley, a close friend of the family and owner of nearby Donwell Abbey. George is the brother of John Knightley, a lawyer and the husband of Emma's sister Isabella who lives in London.

Emma prides herself on her matchmaking skills, and successfully arranges the marriage of her old governess, Miss Taylor, to Mr Weston. She befriends Harriet Smith, a naive young woman of uncertain parentage who boards at a local girls' school, and persuades her to decline a marriage proposal from a respectable farmer, Robert Martin, instead recommending the local vicar, Mr Elton. George Knightley privately expresses his disapproval, telling Emma that she is encouraging Harriet to aspire to a man who can never accept her.

On the way home from a dinner party, Emma finds herself alone in a carriage with Mr Elton. To her shock, he proposes marriage, his proposal leading to an awkward rejection. Only then does she learn that what she has mistaken for affection towards Harriet is merely Mr Elton's attempt to woo Emma herself. Mr Elton subsequently leaves the area and returns six weeks later with a new wife, the pretentious Augusta.

Two long-anticipated visitors arrive: Jane Fairfax, the highly accomplished niece of Miss Bates, a genteel but poor family friend who is notable for her incessant chatter; and the charming Frank Churchill who, always required to be at his wealthy aunt's beck and call, has had few opportunities to visit. Emma finds herself intrigued by Frank and is envious of Jane's talents.

Frank's arrival prompts the Westons to hold a ball, at which Mr Elton rudely snubs Harriet. She is rescued by George Knightley, who asks her to dance. Emma and Knightley also share a dance, awakening romantic feelings between them.

During a picnic at Box Hill, Frank urges the company to play a lighthearted game, and Emma, in a moment of thoughtless humour, insults Miss Bates, causing her mortification. Knightley privately reprimands Emma for her unkindness, prompting her to reflect on her behaviour. She apologises to Miss Bates, who forgives her. Harriet confides to Emma that she has again found love; she does not name the man, but Emma assumes she is referring to Frank Churchill.

The sudden death of Frank's aunt leads to the revelation that Frank and Jane Fairfax have been secretly engaged, a match they had been concealing from her. Emma attempts to break the news gently to Harriet, only to be told that it is George Knightley, not Frank, whom Harriet loves. According to Harriet, her love is reciprocated.

Knightley happens upon Emma while she is out walking. He is determined now to declare his love for her, but Emma stops him, believing that he has come to confess his love for Harriet. So overcome is Emma when she realises what Knightley is saying that she develops a nosebleed and leaves without a response.

Emma visits Mr Martin to make amends, offering him a portrait of Harriet she drew herself. Mr Martin renews his offer of marriage, and this time Harriet accepts. Knightley proposes again, but Emma cannot bring herself to leave her father; she accepts when Knightley offers to leave his own estate to live at Hartfield. Harriet and Robert Martin marry, followed by Emma and Knightley.

== Cast ==
- Anya Taylor-Joy as Emma Woodhouse
- Johnny Flynn as George Knightley
- Mia Goth as Harriet Smith
- Miranda Hart as Miss Bates
- Bill Nighy as Mr Woodhouse
- Josh O'Connor as the Reverend Mr Elton
- Callum Turner as Frank Churchill
- Amber Anderson as Jane Fairfax
- Rupert Graves as Mr Weston
- Gemma Whelan as Mrs Weston (formerly Miss Taylor)
- Tanya Reynolds as Mrs Augusta Elton
- Connor Swindells as Robert Martin
- Oliver Chris as John Knightley
- Chloe Pirrie as Isabella Knightley
- Angus Imrie as Bartholomew
- Nicholas Burns as Mr Cole
- Myra McFadyen as Mrs Bates
- Lucy Briers as Mrs Reynolds

== Production ==
=== Casting ===
In October 2018, Anya Taylor-Joy was cast in the lead role, and Autumn de Wilde was signed for her directorial debut. In December 2018, Johnny Flynn joined the cast.

In March 2019, Bill Nighy, Mia Goth, Josh O'Connor, Callum Turner, Miranda Hart, Rupert Graves, Gemma Whelan, Amber Anderson and Tanya Reynolds joined the cast, and Alexandra Byrne signed as costume designer.

=== Filming ===
Principal photography began on 18 March 2019, was scheduled to conclude on 24 May, but eventually wrapped on 6 June 2019.

Firle Place in Sussex was used for the exterior of Emma's home, Hartfield, and Wilton House near Salisbury in Wiltshire was used for the exterior and interior of Mr. Knightley's home, Donwell Abbey. Other locations included Lower Slaughter (exteriors) in the Cotswolds standing in for the village of Highbury, Kingston Bagpuize House in Oxfordshire, Leith Hill in Surrey standing in for Box Hill, and Chavenage House at Beverston, Gloucestershire.

=== Title ===
Director de Wilde decided the film's title should include a full stop (period) to signify its being a period piece.

=== Music ===
In the film, Jane Fairfax (played by Amber Anderson) outshines Emma's abbreviated performance of "The Last Rose of Summer" by Irish poet Thomas Moore by performing the third movement from Mozart's Piano Sonata No 12 on the fortepiano. A trained pianist, Anderson had to relearn the piece to adapt her technique to the period instrument's shorter keys.

The credit sequence features "Queen Bee", an original song by Johnny Flynn. Isobel Waller-Bridge asked Flynn to write a song for the film. He wrote "Queen Bee" to convey Knightley's perspective on Emma, and performed it in a style appropriate for the film's period.

The soundtrack features many a cappella recordings of folk songs by such artists as Maddy Prior and the Watersons. De Wilde had an immediate conception of the film's music as rooted in folk music. She also wanted the orchestral score to emulate Sergei Prokofiev's Peter and the Wolf, where the characters had a theme personifying each one.

Anya Taylor-Joy, Anderson and Flynn all sing onscreen in the film. Taylor-Joy took pains to explain that her performance of "The Last Rose of Summer" used an affected style that she imagined Emma Woodhouse would use to charm her audience.

Anderson and Flynn sing a duet of "Drink to Me Only With Thine Eyes" written by Ben Jonson in the film during a ball scene.

The adagio from the final movement of Haydn's Symphony No. 45 in F sharp minor, "Farewell", is also heard in the film.

== Release ==
=== Theatrical ===
Emma was released in the United Kingdom on 14 February 2020, coinciding with Valentine's Day, and in the United States on 21 February.

=== Home media ===
It was released digitally in March 2020 in the United States, Canada and the UK through Premium VOD on streaming platforms, due to movie theatre closures during the COVID-19 pandemic. It was released on DVD and Blu-ray on 19 May.

== Reception ==
=== Box office ===
Emma grossed $10.1 million in the United States and Canada, and $17.3 million in other territories, for a worldwide total of $27.4 million.

In North America, it made $230,000 from five cinemas in its opening weekend, for a per-venue average of $46,000, the highest of 2020 at that point. It was widely released two weeks later, grossing $5 million from 1,565 cinemas and finishing sixth at the box office. Its time at the box office was then interrupted by the COVID-19 pandemic closing cinemas.

In Spain, it has grossed €228,000 ($285,000).

=== Critical response ===
On Rotten Tomatoes, the film holds an approval rating of 86% based on 260 reviews, with an average of 7.3/10. The website's critics consensus reads: "Other adaptations may do a better job of consistently capturing the spirit of the classic source material, but Jane Austen fans should still find a solid match in this Emma." On Metacritic, the film was assigned a weighted average score of 71 out of 100, based on 48 critics, indicating "generally favourable" reviews. Audiences polled by CinemaScore gave the film an average grade of "B" on an A+ to F scale, and PostTrak reported it received an average 3 out of 5 stars, with 44% of people they surveyed saying they would definitely recommend it.

In a mostly favourable review written for Variety, Andrew Barker referred to the film as a "an entirely worthy companion" to other adaptations of the novel, though noted it was "hardly a definitive take".

=== Accolades ===
Award	Date of ceremony	Category	Recipient(s)	Result	Ref.
Academy Awards	25 April 2021	Best Costume Design	Alexandra Byrne	Nominated	
Academy Awards	25 April 2021	Best Makeup and Hairstyling	Marese Langan, Laura Allen & Claudia Stolze	Nominated	
British Academy Film Awards	11 April 2021	Best Costume Design	Alexandra Byrne	Nominated	
Boston Society of Film Critics Awards	13 December 2020	Best New Filmmaker	Autumn de Wilde	Runner-up	
Chicago Film Critics Association	21 December 2020	Best Art Direction	Kave Quinn and Stella Fox	Nominated	
Chicago Film Critics Association	21 December 2020	Best Costume Design	Alexandra Byrne	Won	
Costume Designers Guild Awards	13 April 2021	Excellence in Period Film	Alexandra Byrne	Nominated	
Critics' Choice Awards	7 March 2021	Best Costume Design	Alexandra Byrne	Nominated	
Critics' Choice Awards	7 March 2021	Best Production Design	Kave Quinn and Stella Fox	Nominated	
Critics' Choice Awards	7 March 2021	Best Makeup and Hairstyling	Emma	Nominated	
Golden Globe Awards	28 February 2021	Best Actress in a Motion Picture – Musical or Comedy	Anya Taylor-Joy	Nominated	
Golden Trailer Awards	22 July 2021	Best Romance TV Spot	Gossip, Focus Features	Won	
Golden Trailer Awards	22 July 2021	Best Voice Over TV Spot	Delicious, Focus Features	Won	
Hollywood Critics Association Awards	5 March 2021	Best Costume Design	Alexandra Byrne	Nominated	
Hollywood Critics Association Awards	5 March 2021	Best Production Design	Kave Quinn	Nominated	
Hollywood Critics Association Midseason Awards	2 July 2020	Best Picture	Emma	Nominated	
Hollywood Critics Association Midseason Awards	2 July 2020	Best Actress	Anya Taylor-Joy	Nominated	
Hollywood Critics Association Midseason Awards	2 July 2020	Best Female Director	Autumn de Wilde	Runner-up	
Hollywood Critics Association Midseason Awards	2 July 2020	Best Adapted Screenplay	Eleanor Catton	Nominated	
Satellite Awards	15 February 2021	Best Actress in a Motion Picture – Comedy or Musical	Anya Taylor-Joy	Nominated	
Satellite Awards	15 February 2021	Best Costume Design	Alexandra Byrne	Nominated	
Set Decorators Society of America Awards	31 March 2021	Best Achievement in Décor/Design of a Period Feature Film	Stella Fox and Kave Quinn	Nominated	
St. Louis Film Critics Association	17 January 2021	Best Comedy Film	Emma	Nominated	
St. Louis Film Critics Association	17 January 2021	Best Production Design	Kave Quinn	Nominated	
