= Emma (1996 TV film) =

1996 drama television film

- VHS cover
- Based on: Emma by Jane Austen
- Screenplay by: Andrew Davies
- Directed by: Diarmuid Lawrence
- Starring: Kate Beckinsale; Samantha Morton; Samantha Bond; Mark Strong
- Music by: Dominic Muldowney
- Countries of origin: United Kingdom; United States
- Original language: English

Production
- Producer: Sue Birtwistle
- Cinematography: Remi Adefarasin
- Editor: Don Fairservice
- Running time: 107 minutes
- Production companies: A&E Networks; United Film & Television Productions; Meridian Broadcasting
- Budget: £2.5 million

Original release
- Network: ITV
- Release: 24 November 1996
- Network: A&E
- Release: 16 February 1997

Emma is a 1996 drama television film based on the 1815 novel by Jane Austen, directed by Diarmuid Lawrence and written by Andrew Davies. This film stars Kate Beckinsale as the title character, and also features Samantha Morton as Harriet Smith and Mark Strong as Mr. Knightley.

Davies had made the successful 1995 television serial Pride and Prejudice for the BBC when he proposed to adapt Emma for the corporation. The BBC had already made an agreement with another screenwriter, leading Davies to approach ITV instead.

Emma is a co-production of the United Kingdom and the United States. It aired in the United Kingdom on ITV on 24 November 1996, and in the United States on A&E on 16 February 1997. It received generally positive reviews from critics, many of whom believed it to be superior to Miramax's theatrical Emma starring Gwyneth Paltrow. Most focused on Beckinsale's performance as a positive highlight. It garnered an estimated 12 million viewers in the United Kingdom.

== Plot ==
Miss Emma Woodhouse lives with her father on his Hartfield estate in the small Surrey town of Highbury, and is young, pretty, and rich. Although she has decided that she will never marry, Emma takes credit for matchmaking her friend and former governess, Miss Taylor, to the widower Mr. Weston. Emma decides to organise marriages for others of her acquaintance, despite friendly warnings from Mr. George Knightley not to meddle. He is an old friend, her brother-in-law, and the wealthy owner of Donwell Abbey just outside Highbury. Emma resolves to marry off her new friend, a pretty but poor girl named Harriet Smith, to the young vicar Mr. Elton. This fails once Emma realises, to her horror, that Elton wishes to marry her instead.

New arrivals in Highbury include the orphaned Miss Jane Fairfax and Elton's pretentious new wife Augusta. Frank Churchill, the handsome son of Mr. Weston, also arrives, generating interest and gossip. Emma, so sure of her ability to judge the feelings of others, believes that Frank wishes to marry her. Eventually the town discovers that Frank and Miss Fairfax have been secretly engaged, while Emma comes to recognise her true feelings for Mr. Knightley.

== Cast ==
- Kate Beckinsale as Emma Woodhouse
- Bernard Hepton as Mr. Woodhouse
- Mark Strong as George Knightley
- Samantha Morton as Harriet Smith
- Olivia Williams as Jane Fairfax
- James Hazeldine as Mr. Weston
- Samantha Bond as Miss Taylor/Mrs. Weston
- Raymond Coulthard as Frank Churchill
- Dominic Rowan as Mr. Elton
- Lucy Robinson as Mrs. Elton
- Prunella Scales as Miss Bates
- Sylvia Barter as Mrs. Bates
- Guy Henry as John Knightley
- Dido Miles as Isabella Knightley
- Alistair Petrie as Robert Martin

== Production ==
Andrew Davies adapted Jane Austen's 1815 novel Emma for television. Previously, he was the screenwriter for the successful 1995 BBC TV serial Pride and Prejudice starring Jennifer Ehle and Colin Firth. Davies offered to adapt Emma for the BBC, but it had already commissioned Sandy Welch as screenwriter. Michael Wearing, BBC head of drama serials, stated "It was a very, very difficult situation. I had already commissioned Sandy Welch, one of our BBC writers, to do Emma. We really were in a fix." In response, Davies and his team successfully made an offer to BBC's rival, ITV. Pride and Prejudice's entire production team reportedly joined Davies when he began adapting Emma. It was his second adaptation of an Austen novel.

The production reportedly cost £2.5 million, and was shot during the summer of 1996.

=== Filming ===
- Broughton Castle, Banbury – (Donwell Abbey)
- Sudeley Castle, Gloucestershire – (Donwell Abbey exteriors)
- Stanway House, Stanway, Gloucestershire, Cheltenham, Gloucestershire – (Donwell Abbey interior)
- Trafalgar Park, Salisbury – (Hartfield)
- Dorney Court, Dorney, Buckinghamshire – (Randalls)
- Lacock, Wiltshire – (Highbury Village)
- Thame Park, Oxfordshire – (Abbey Mill Farm, Hartfield interiors, etc.)

== Themes and analysis ==
Film critics have studied Emma for its depiction of class. In a contribution for the 2007 book Literary Intermediality: The Transit of Literature Through the Media Circuit, Lydia Martin noted that unlike the Miramax 1996 theatrical film starring Gwyneth Paltrow, Davies' Emma displays a "realistic, or even naturalistic, approach by focusing on the lower classes in which Jane Austen never really took any interest." Indeed, adds Carole Dole, "reminders of Highbury's class divisions are scattered throughout" the production. Davies provides social context with fleeting scenes of the lower classes in a neutral, educational way – unlike the 1995 film Persuasion, Emma does not encourage viewers to identify with the servants.

== Release ==
Emma was broadcast on 24 November 1996 on ITV, garnering an estimated 12 million viewers. Emma was also broadcast on the American channel A&E on 16 February 1997. It was released on DVD in 1999.

The adaptation re-aired in 2007, as part of ITV's Jane Austen Season, and as part of PBS Masterpiece's Jane Austen marathon on 23 March 2008. It was also aired on 27 December 2008, as a series of Christmas "specials" on BBC One.

== Reception ==
Many reviewers positively compared the TV drama to the 1996 feature film starring Paltrow. People's Tom Gliatto found it to be superior to the 1996 film, attributing this to Beckinsale's performance: "Paltrow played the part with a swanlike haughtiness. Beckinsale is vibrantly girlish and romantic. And she looks smashing in Empire-waist dresses." Gliatto also positively commented on Davies' script for "captur[ing] not just Austen's light charm but the pinpricks of her social criticism." Caryn James of The New York Times added that in a story with an unlikeable heroine, Beckinsale "walks [the] fine line beautifully... [She] is plainer looking than Ms. Paltrow's, and altogether more believable and funnier. She came to the role well prepared, after playing another socially self-assured comic figure in the recent film Cold Comfort Farm." James also lauded the screenplay for doing "a deft job of letting viewers pick up the social cues that Emma misses" and for indicating why Emma and Knightley are well-suited for each other.

Writing for The Washington Post, Megan Rosenfeld praised the production and especially saved positive comment for Beckinsale, whom she called perhaps "the best [Emma] of all" the previous adaptations of the novel. The actress, Rosenfeld opined, "looks at home in the dresses, cavernous houses and rolling countryside of Austen's 19th-century England, and yet seems modern in her alertness and in her way of not being intimidated by men. Her Emma gives you the confidence that any mischief she may get into can probably be undone." Gerard Gilbert of The Independent agreed, writing that Beckinsale "has the right mixture of sassiness, nosiness and self-satisfaction."

John Carman of the Los Angeles Daily News wrote that "at times, Emma seems to be a Melrose Place for the drawing-room set." He also noted it to be "scrumptiously filmed," calling it "a feast for the eyes and a balm for the heart." The Daily Herald gave a negative review, and believed it was the worst of the three versions released. The reviewer still praised it for being "natural, faithful and likable," but criticized Strong as miscast. Davies, remarked the newspaper, "has written a pithy, direct Emma that, unlike his script for Pride and Prejudice, clocks in at a fraction of the time it takes to read the book."

=== Accolades ===
Award	Category	Recipients and nominees	Result
British Academy Television Awards	Best Make Up/Hair	Mary Hillman	Nominated
Barcelona International Television Festival	Best Fiction Mini-Series	Emma	Won
Primetime Emmy Awards	Outstanding Art Direction for a Miniseries or a Special	Don Taylor (production designer), Jo Graysmark (art director), John Bush (set decorator)	Won
Primetime Emmy Awards	Outstanding Costumes for a Miniseries, Movie or a Special	Jenny Beavan	Won
