= Emma (novel) =

1816 novel by Jane Austen

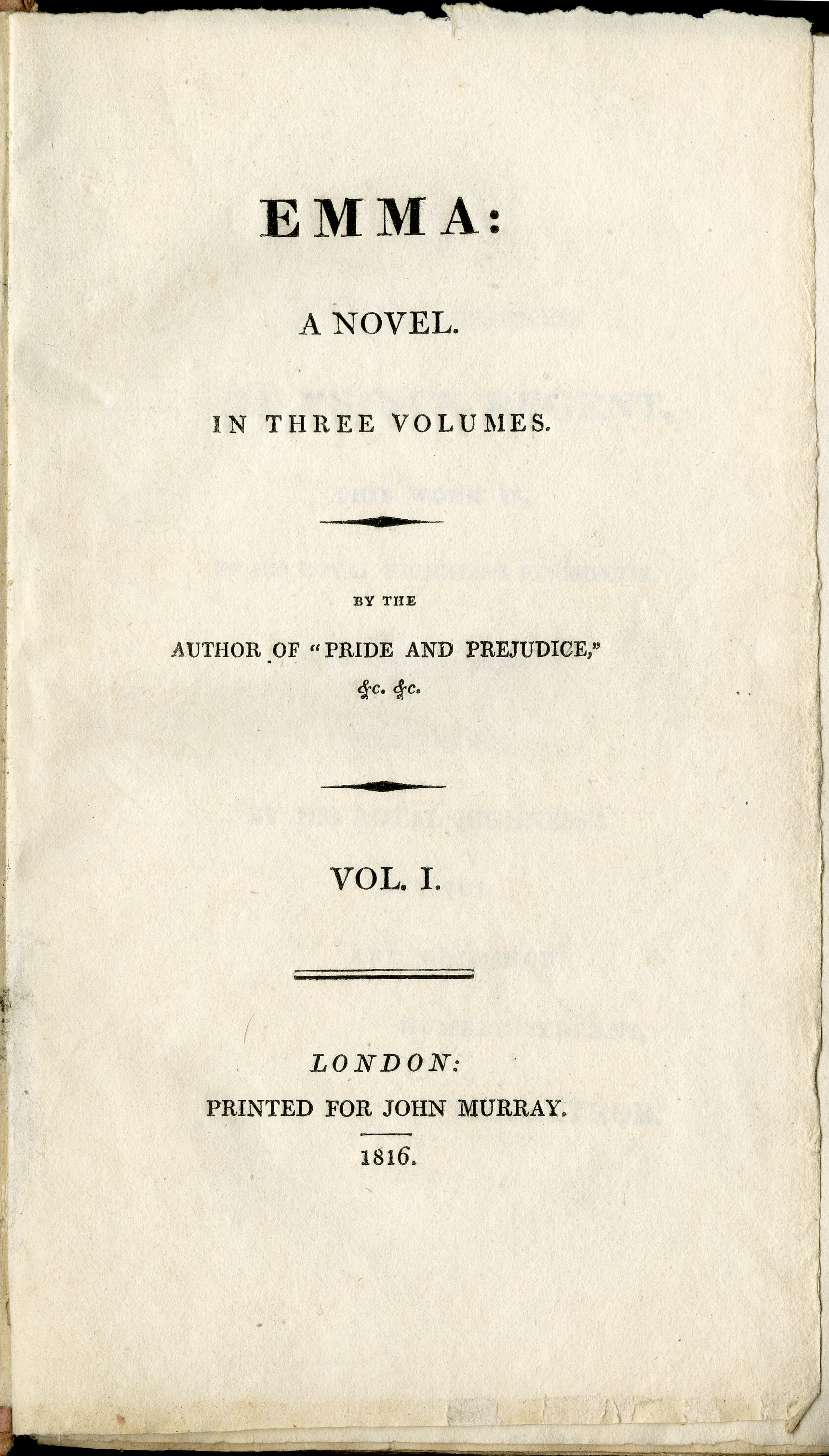
- Title page of the first edition, 1816
- Author: Jane Austen
- Language: English
- Genre: Novel of manners
- Set in: Southern England and Yorkshire, early 19th century
- Published: 1816 (published on 23 December 1815, although the title page is dated 1816)
- Publisher: John Murray
- Publication place: United Kingdom
- Media type: Print: hardback
- Pages: 1,036, in three volumes
- Dewey Decimal: 823.7
- LC Class: PR4034 .E5
- Text: Emma at Wikisource

Emma is a novel written by English author Jane Austen. It is set in the fictional Surrey village of Highbury and the surrounding estates of Hartfield, Randalls, and Donwell Abbey, and involves the relationships among people from a small number of families. The novel was first published in December 1815, although the title page is dated 1816. As in her other novels, Austen explores the concerns and difficulties of genteel women living in Georgian–Regency England. Emma is a comedy of manners.

Before she began the novel, Austen wrote, "I am going to take a heroine whom no one but myself will much like." In the first sentence, she introduces the title character by stating "Emma Woodhouse, handsome, clever, and rich, with a comfortable home and a happy disposition, seemed to unite some of the best blessings of existence; and had lived nearly twenty-one years in the world with very little to distress or vex her." Emma is spoiled, headstrong, and self-satisfied; she greatly overestimates her own matchmaking abilities; she is blind to the dangers of meddling in other people's lives; and her imagination and perceptions often lead her astray.

Emma, written after Austen's move to Chawton, was her last novel to be published during her lifetime. The last complete novel Austen wrote, Persuasion, was published posthumously.

Emma has been adapted for a number of films, television programmes, and stage plays.

== Plot ==
Emma Woodhouse's friend and former governess, Miss Taylor, has just married Mr Weston. Emma takes credit for bringing them together and feels herself skilled at matchmaking. Against the advice of her friend Mr Knightley, Emma attempts to match her new friend, Harriet Smith, with Mr Elton, the vicar of Highbury. Emma persuades Harriet to refuse a marriage proposal from respectable young farmer Robert Martin, although Harriet likes him. Mr Elton, a social climber, mistakenly believes Emma is in love with him and proposes to her. When Emma reveals she believed him attached to Harriet, he is outraged, considering Harriet socially inferior. Mr Elton goes to Bath and returns with a pretentious, nouveau-riche wife, as Mr Knightley had predicted. Harriet is heartbroken, and Emma feels ashamed for misleading her.

Mr Weston's son Frank Churchill arrives for a two-week visit. Adopted as a boy by his wealthy and domineering aunt, Frank has rarely visited his father. Jane Fairfax also arrives to visit her aunt, Miss Bates, and grandmother, Mrs Bates. She is now twenty-one and intends to support herself by becoming a governess. She is the same age as Emma and has received an excellent education through her father's friend, Colonel Campbell, but has no financial resources. Emma envies her and is annoyed by everyone's praise of Jane. Mrs Elton takes Jane under her wing and announces that she will find her a governess post.

Emma decides that Jane arrived earlier than expected because of an attraction to Mr Dixon, Colonel Campbell's new son-in-law. She confides this to Frank, who met Jane and the Campbells at Weymouth the previous year, and he apparently agrees. Suspicions are further fuelled when a piano is sent anonymously for Jane. Emma believes she is falling in love with Frank, but it does not last. The Eltons treat Harriet poorly, culminating in Mr Elton publicly snubbing Harriet at a ball. Mr Knightley, who normally refrained from dancing, gallantly asks Harriet to dance. The day after the ball, Frank brings Harriet to Hartfield, as she fainted after a rough encounter with local gypsies. Emma mistakes Harriet's gratitude for being in love with Frank. During an excursion to Box Hill, a local scenic spot, Frank and Emma are joking when Emma thoughtlessly mocks Miss Bates's loquaciousness.

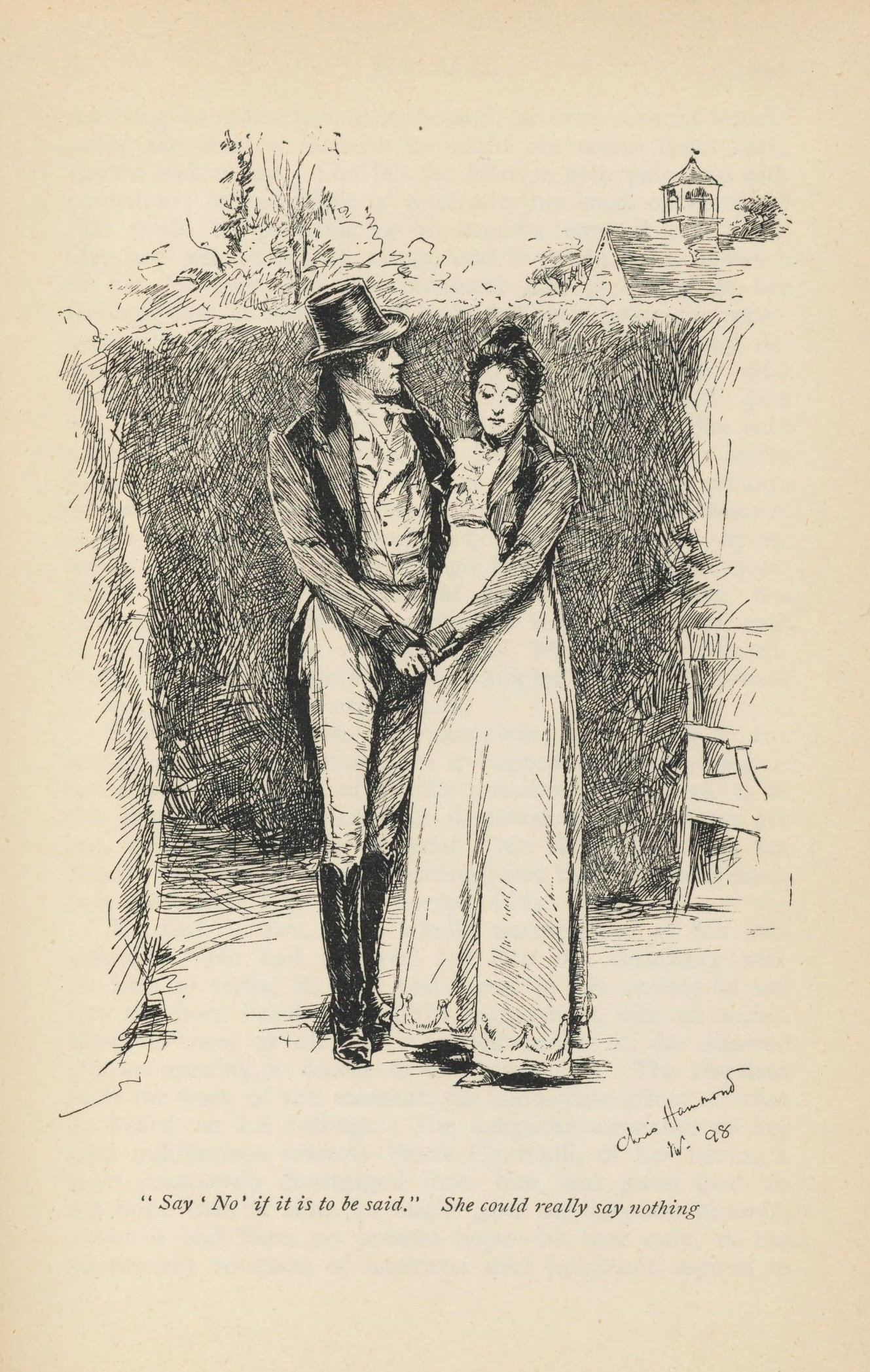
1898 illustration of Mr Knightley and Emma Woodhouse, Volume III chapter XIII

When Mr Knightley scolds Emma for making fun of Miss Bates, she is ashamed. The next day, she visits Miss Bates to atone for her bad behaviour. During the visit, Emma learns that Jane has accepted a governess position from one of Mrs Elton's friends. However, Jane is ill and refuses to see Emma or receive her gifts. When word comes that Frank's aunt has died, he and Jane reveal to the Westons that they have been secretly engaged since autumn. Frank knew his aunt would disapprove of the match. Maintaining the secrecy strained the conscientious Jane and caused the couple to quarrel, with Jane ending the engagement. Frank's easy-going uncle readily gives his blessing to the match. The engagement is made public, leaving Emma annoyed to discover that she had been so wrong.

Emma believes Frank's engagement will devastate Harriet, but instead, Harriet says she loves Mr Knightley. Though she knows the match is too unequal, Emma's encouragement and Mr Knightley's kindness have given her hope. Emma is startled and realises that she is in love with Mr Knightley. He returns to console Emma about Frank and Jane's engagement. When she admits her foolishness, he proposes, and she accepts. Harriet accepts Robert Martin's second proposal, and they are the first couple to marry. Jane and Emma reconcile, and Frank and Jane visit the Westons. Once the mourning period for Frank's aunt ends, they will marry. Before the end of November, Emma and Mr Knightley are married with the prospect of "perfect happiness". They will live at Hartfield with Mr Woodhouse.

== Principal characters ==
Emma Woodhouse, the protagonist of the story, is a beautiful, high-spirited, intelligent, and somewhat spoiled young woman from the landed gentry. She is nearly twenty-one when the story opens. Her mother died when she was young, and she has been mistress of the house (Hartfield) since her elder sister got married. Although intelligent, she lacks the discipline to practise or study anything in depth. She is portrayed as compassionate to the poor but at the same time has a strong sense of class status. Her affection for and patience towards her valetudinarian father are also noteworthy. While she is in many ways mature, Emma makes some serious mistakes, mainly due to her lack of experience and her conviction that she is always right. Although she has vowed she will never marry, she delights in making matches for others. After a brief flirtation with Frank Churchill, she realises that she loves Mr Knightley.

Mr George Knightley, aged 37 years, is Emma's neighbour and close friend. He is her only critic. Mr Knightley owns Donwell Abbey, which includes extensive grounds and farms. He is the elder brother of Mr John Knightley, the husband of Emma's elder sister Isabella. Mr Knightley is considerate, hardworking, aware of the feelings of the other characters, and always exhibits good behaviour and judgment. He becomes angry with Emma for persuading Harriet to turn down Robert Martin, a farmer on the Donwell estate, and warns Emma against pushing Harriet towards Mr Elton, knowing that the vicar seeks to marry for money. He is suspicious of Frank Churchill and his motives and suspects that Frank has a secret understanding with Jane Fairfax. Mr Knightley is the local magistrate and is the leading figure of the parish select vestry which is in all practical respects, the governing authority of Highbury.

Frank Churchill, Mr Weston's son by his first marriage, is an amiable young man, who, at age 23, is liked by almost everyone. Mr Knightley, however, thinks him immature and selfish for failing to visit after his father's wedding. After his mother's death, he was raised by his wealthy aunt and uncle, the Churchills, at the family estate of Enscombe in Yorkshire. To please his aunt he assumed the name Churchill on his majority, so that he might inherit her estate in that name; but while she still lives—and she is in poor health—he remains entirely dependent on her continued approval to maintain his expectations. Frank is given to living a carefree existence and became secretly engaged to Jane Fairfax at Weymouth, although he fears his aunt will forbid the match because Jane is not wealthy. He manipulates and plays games with the other characters to ensure his engagement to Jane remains concealed.

Jane Fairfax is an orphan whose only family are her aunt, Miss Bates, and her grandmother, Mrs Bates. The three of them share genteel poverty. She is a beautiful, resourceful, bright, polite, and elegant woman. The same age as Emma, she is well educated, talented at singing and playing the piano, and the only person whom Emma envies. After her parents died, Colonel Campbell, an army friend of her father, provided her with an education while, from age nine, she shared his home and family. Needing to support her family, she becomes a governess; for unmarried girls of good family and education but no fortune, there was little other choice. The secrecy of her engagement with Frank Churchill goes against her principles and distresses her greatly.

Harriet Smith, a young friend of Emma, just seventeen when the story opens, is a beautiful but unsophisticated girl. She has been a pupil at a nearby school, where she met the sisters of Robert Martin. As a parlour boarder at the school she now helps supervise younger pupils. Emma takes Harriet under her wing, and she becomes the subject of Emma's misguided matchmaking attempts. She is revealed in the last chapter to be the natural daughter of a decent tradesman, although he is not a gentleman, as Emma believed he would be. When Harriet and Robert Martin marry, the now wiser Emma approves of the match.

Robert Martin is a well-to-do, 24-year-old tenant farmer who, though not a gentleman, is a friendly, amiable and hard-working young man, well esteemed by Mr George Knightley. He becomes acquainted and subsequently smitten with Harriet during her two-month stay at Abbey Mill Farm at the invitation of his sister, Elizabeth Martin. His first marriage proposal, in a letter, is rejected by Harriet under Emma's influence, an incident which puts Mr Knightley and Emma into disagreement. Emma had convinced herself that Harriet's class and breeding were above associating with the Martins, much less marrying one. His second marriage proposal is later accepted by a contented Harriet and approved by a wiser Emma; their joining marks the first of the three happy couples to marry in the end.

Reverend Philip Elton is a good-looking, initially well-mannered, and ambitious young vicar, 27 years old and unmarried when the story opens. He is respectable and conscientious in his religious duties and care for his parishioners and in his responsibilities in the administration and governance of the parish. He is well aware of his good looks and status, and it is only when he is around other men that he shows his true colours and reveals his intention to marry a wife with a significant private income. Emma wants him to marry Harriet; however, he aspires to secure Emma's hand in marriage to gain her dowry of £30,000. Mr Elton displays his mercenary nature by quickly marrying another woman of means after Emma rejects him.

Augusta Elton, formerly Miss Hawkins, is Mr Elton's wife. She has 10,000 pounds "or thereabouts" (the vague description of her dowry perhaps suggests she is not as wealthy as she claims) but lacks good manners, committing common vulgarities such as using people's names too intimately (as in "Jane", not "Miss Fairfax"; "Knightley", not "Mr Knightley"). She is a boasting, pretentious woman who expects her due as a new bride in the village. Emma is polite to her but does not like her, and the two instantly become passive-aggressive enemies. She patronises Jane, which earns Jane the sympathy of others. Her lack of social graces shows the good breeding of the other characters, particularly Jane Fairfax and Mrs Weston, and shows the difference between gentility and money. Mrs Elton repeatedly makes unbelievable declarations about her background—such as exaggerated claims of the similarity between Emma's estate, Hartfield, and her brother-in-law's manor, Maple Grove—revealing her dishonesty and enforcing the idea that she is a scheming parvenu trying her utmost to conceal her lower origins.

Mrs Weston was Emma's governess for sixteen years as Miss Anne Taylor and remains her closest friend and confidante after she marries Mr Weston. She is a sensible woman who loves Emma. Mrs Weston acts as a surrogate mother to her former charge and, occasionally, as a voice of moderation and reason. The Weston and the Woodhouse families see each other almost daily. Near the end of the story, the Westons' baby Anna is born.

Mr Weston is a widower and a businessman living in Highbury who marries Miss Taylor after buying a house called Randalls. By his first marriage, he is father to Frank Weston Churchill, who was adopted and raised by his late wife's brother and his wife. He sees his son in London each year. He married his first wife, Miss Churchill, when he was a captain in the militia, posted near her home. Mr Weston is a sanguine, optimistic man, who enjoys socialising, making friends quickly in business and among his neighbours.

Miss Bates is a friendly, garrulous spinster whose mother, Mrs Bates, is a friend of Mr Woodhouse. Her niece is Jane Fairfax, daughter of her late sister. She was raised in better circumstances in her younger days as the vicar's daughter. Now she and her mother live in rented rooms in Highbury. One day, Emma humiliates her on a day out in the country, when she alludes to her tiresome prolixity.

Mr Henry Woodhouse, Emma's father, is always concerned for his health, and to the extent that it does not interfere with his own, the health and comfort of his friends. He is a valetudinarian (i.e., similar to a hypochondriac but more likely to be genuinely ill). He assumes that a great many things are hazardous to his health, especially draughts of wind and rich food. Emma loves him and takes care for his well-being, and he loves both his daughters. He laments that "poor Isabella" and especially "poor Miss Taylor" have married and live away from him. He is a fond father and grandfather who did not remarry when his wife died. Instead he brought in Miss Taylor to educate his daughters and become part of the family. Because he is generous and well-mannered, his neighbours accommodate him when they can. Although his Hartfield estate is relatively modest, Mr Woodhouse owns substantial other property which provides him with an income scarcely less than that of Mr Knightley at Donwell Abbey, but he does not play any part in the public governance of the village.

Isabella Knightley (née Woodhouse) is the elder sister of Emma by seven years. She is married to John Knightley. She lives in London with her husband and their five children (Henry, 'little' John, Bella, 'little' Emma, and George). She is similar in disposition to her father, and her relationship to Mr Wingfield, (her family's physician) mirrors that of her father's to Mr Perry.

John Knightley is Isabella's husband and George's younger brother, 31 years old. He is a lawyer (either a barrister or solicitor) by profession. Like the others raised in the area, he admires Jane Fairfax. He greatly enjoys the company of his family, including his brother and his Woodhouse in-laws, but is not a very sociable man. He is forthright with Emma, his sister-in-law.

== Publication history ==
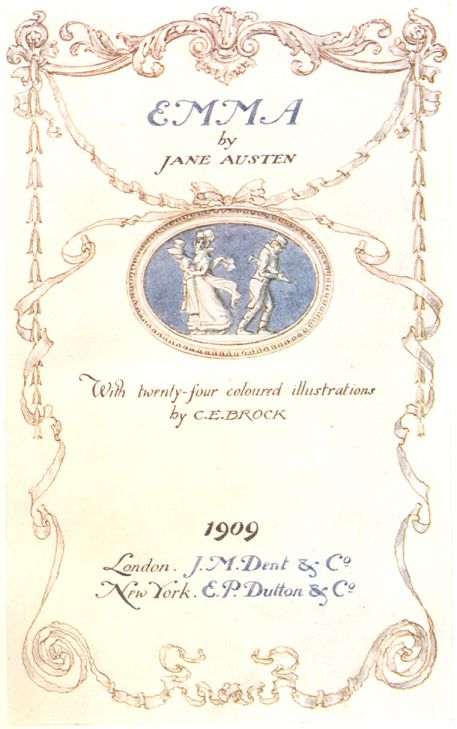
Title page from 1909 edition of Emma

Written after the publication of Pride and Prejudice, Austen submitted Emma to the London publisher John Murray II in the autumn of 1815. Murray offered her £450 (equivalent to £35,000 in 2025) for the rights to Emma and the copyrights to Mansfield Park and Sense and Sensibility. She rejected his offer and instead published 2000 copies of the novel at her own expense, retaining the copyright and paying Murray a 10% commission. The publication in December 1815 (dated 1816) consisted of a three-volume set in duodecimo at the selling price of £1.1s (one guinea) per set.

Prior to publication, Austen's novels had come to the attention of the Prince Regent, whose librarian at Carlton House, James Stanier Clarke, showed her around the Library at the Prince Regent's request, and who suggested a dedication to the Prince Regent in a future publication. This resulted in a dedication of Emma to the Prince Regent at the time of publication and a dedication copy of the novel sent to Carlton House in December 1815.

In the United States, copies of the first publication were sold in 1818 for $4 each (equivalent to $84 in 2025), as well as an American edition published by Mathew Carey of Philadelphia in 1816. The number of copies of this edition are not known. A later American edition was published in 1833 and again in 1838 by Carey, Lea, and Blanchard. A French version was published in 1816 by Arthus Bertrand, publisher for Madame Isabelle De Montolieu. A second French version for the Austrian market was published in 1817 Viennese publisher Schrambl.

Richard Bentley reissued Emma in 1833, along with Austen's five other novels, in his series of Standard Novels. This issue did not contain the dedication page to the Prince Regent. These editions were frequently reprinted up until 1882 with the final publication of the Steventon Edition. Emma has remained in continuous publication in English throughout the remainder of the nineteenth century and into the twentieth and twenty-first centuries. In addition to the French translation already mentioned, Emma was translated into Swedish and German in the nineteenth century and into fifteen other languages in the twentieth century including Arabic, Chinese, Danish, Dutch, German and Italian.

== Reception ==
Prior to publishing, John Murray's reader, William Gifford, who was also the editor of the Quarterly Review, said of the novel that "Of Emma I have nothing but good to say. I was sure of the writer before you mentioned her. The MS though plainly written has yet some, indeed many little omissions, and an expression may now and then be amended in passing through the press. I will readily undertake the revision." Early reviews of Emma were generally favourable, and were more numerous than those of any other of Austen's novels. One important review, requested by John Murray prior to publication and written by Sir Walter Scott, appeared anonymously in March 1816 in the Quarterly Review, although the date of the journal was October 1815. He writes:

The author is already known to the public by the two novels announced in her title page, and both, the last especially, attracted, with justice, an attention from the public far superior to what is granted to the ephemeral productions which supply the regular demand of watering-places and circulating libraries. They belong to a class of fictions which has arisen almost in our own times, and which draws the characters and incidents introduced more immediately from the current of ordinary life than was permitted by the former rules of the novel...Emma has even less story than either of the preceding novels ... The author's knowledge of the world, and the peculiar tact with which she presents characters that the reader cannot fail to recognize, reminds us something of the merits of the Flemish school of painting. The subjects are not often elegant, and certainly never grand: but they are finished up to nature, and with a precision which delights the reader.

Two other unsigned reviews appeared in 1816, one in The Champion, also in March, and another in September of the same year in Gentleman's Magazine. Other commenters include Thomas Moore, the Irish poet, singer and entertainer who was a contemporary of Austen's; he wrote to Samuel Rogers, an English poet, in 1816:

Let me entreat you to read Emma – it is the very perfection of novel-writing – and I cannot praise it more highly than by saying it is often extremely like your own method of describing things – so much effect with so little effort!

A contemporary Scottish novelist, Susan Edmonstone Ferrier, wrote to a friend, also in 1816:

I have been reading Emma, which is excellent; there is no story whatever, and the heroine is not better than other people; but the characters are all true to life and the style so piquant, that it does not require the adventitious aids of mystery and adventure.

There was some criticism about the lack of story. John Murray remarked that it lacked "incident and Romance"; Maria Edgeworth, the author of Belinda, to whom Austen had sent a complimentary copy, wrote:

there was no story in it, except that Miss Emma found that the man whom she designed for Harriet's lover was an admirer of her own – & he was affronted at being refused by Emma & Harriet wore the willow – and smooth, thin water-gruel is according to Emma's father's opinion a very good thing & it is very difficult to make a cook understand what you mean by smooth, thin water-gruel!!

Austen also collected comments from friends and family on their opinions of Emma. Writing several years later, John Henry Newman observed in a letter about the novel:

Everything Miss Austen writes is clever, but I desiderate something. There is a want of body to the story. The action is frittered away in over-little things. There are some beautiful things in it. Emma herself is the most interesting to me of all her heroines. I feel kind to her whenever I think of her ... That other woman, Fairfax, is a dolt – but I like Emma.

Later reviewers or commenters on the novel include Charlotte Brontë, George Henry Lewes, Juliet Pollock, Anne Ritchie, Henry James, Reginald Farrer, Virginia Woolf and E. M. Forster. Other reviewers include Thomas Babington Macaulay who considered Austen to be a "Prose Shakespeare", and Margaret Oliphant who stated in Blackwood's Edinburgh Magazine in March that she prefers Emma to Austen's other works and that it is "the work of her mature mind". Although Austen's Pride and Prejudice is the most popular of her novels, Robert McCrum suggests that Emma "is her masterpiece, mixing the sparkle of her early books with a deep sensibility". Academic John Mullan argued that Emma was a revolutionary novel which changed the shape of what is possible in fiction" because it "bent narration through the distorting lens of its protagonist's mind".

== Themes ==
=== Highbury as a character ===
The British critic Robert Irvine wrote that unlike the situation in Austen's previous novels, the town of Highbury in Surrey emerges as a character in its own right. Irvine wrote that: "In Emma, we find something much closer to a genuinely communal voice, a point of view at work in the narrative that cannot be reduced to the subjectivity of any one character. This point of view appears both as something perceived by Emma, an external perspective on events and characters that the reader encounters as and when Emma recognises it; and as an independent discourse appearing in the text alongside the discourse of the narrator and characters". Irvine used as an example the following passage: "The charming Augusta Hawkins, in addition to all the usual advantages of perfect beauty and merit, was in possession of as many thousands as would always be called ten; a point of some dignity, as well as some convenience: the story told well; he had not thrown himself away—he had gained a woman of £10,000 or thereabouts; and he had gained with delightful rapidity—the first hour of introduction he had been so very soon followed by distinguishing notice; the history which he had to give Mrs Cole of the rise and progress of the affair was so glorious". Irvine points out the adjective "charming" appears to the narrator speaking, but notes the sentence goes on to associate "perfect" with "usual", which he pointed out was an incongruity. Irvine suggested the next sentence "would always be called ten" is in fact the voice of the community of Highbury, which wants the fiancée of Mr Elton to be "perfect", whom the narrator sarcastically calls the "usual" sort of community gossip is about a new arrival in Highbury, whom everyone thinks is "charming". Since the character of Mrs Elton is in fact far from "charming", the use of the term "charming" to describe her is either the gossip of Highbury and/or the narrator being sarcastic.

Likewise, the Australian scholar John Wiltshire wrote that one of Austen's achievements was to "give depth" to the "Highbury world". Wiltshire noted that Austen put the population of Highbury as 352 people, and said that although clearly most of these people do not appear as characters - or at best as minor characters - Austen created the impression of Highbury as a "social commonwealth". Wiltshire used as an example of Mr Perry, the town apothecary who is frequently mentioned in the town gossip, but never appears in the book, having a "kind of familiarity by proxy". Wiltshire also notes the scene where Emma and Harriet visit a poor cottage on the outskirts of Highbury; during their walk, it is made clear from Emma's remarks that this part of Highbury is not her Highbury.

The character of Frank is a member of the "discursive community" of Highbury long before he actually appears, as his father tells everyone in Highbury about him. Emma forms her judgement of Frank based on what she hears about him in Highbury before she meets him. Irvine wrote that Austen's use of three different voices in Emma—the voice of Highbury, the narrator's voice, and Emma's voice, can at times make it very confusing to the reader about just who is actually speaking. However, Irvine wrote that one accepts that the voice of Highbury is often speaking, then much of the book makes sense, as Emma believes she has a power that she does not, to make Frank either love or not via her interest or indifference, which is explained as the result of the gossip of Highbury, which attributes Emma this power.

This is especially the case as Emma is born into the elite of Highbury, which is portrayed as a female-dominated world. Irvine wrote that Elizabeth Bennet in Pride and Prejudice and Fanny Price in Mansfield Park enjoy the moral authority of being good women, but must marry a well-off man to have the necessary social influence to fully use this moral authority whereas Emma is born with this authority. Emma herself acknowledges this when she says to Harriet that she possesses: "none of the usual inducements to marry.... Fortune I do not want; employment I do not want; consequence I do not want." However, political power still resides with men in the patriarchal society of Regency England, as the book notes that Mr Knightley is not only a member of the gentry, but also serves as the magistrate of Highbury. Emma clashes with Knightley at the beginning of the novel over the all-important "distinctions of rank", namely does Harriet Smith belong with the yeoman class together with Robert Martin, or the gentry class that Emma and Knightley are both part of. Knightley declares his respect for both Smith and Martin, but argues that as part of the yeomen class, neither belongs with the gentry, while Emma insists on including her best friend/protegée in with the gentry. In Regency England and in Emma, the term friendship describes a power relationship where one higher party can do favours for the lower party while the term "claim intimacy" is a relationship of equals. Mrs Elton has "friendship" with Jane Fairfax while she "claims intimacy" with Mr Knightley. The use of these terms "friendship" and "claim intimacy" refers to the question of who belongs to the local elite. Neither Emma nor Mr Knightley question the right of the elite to dominate society, but rather their power struggle is over who belongs to the elite, and who has the authority to make the decision about whom to include and whom to exclude, which shows that in a certain sense that Emma is just as powerful socially as is Mr Knightley. Further complicating this power struggle is the arrival of Mrs Elton, who attempts to elevate Jane Fairfax into the elite. This is cruel as Jane is not rich enough to properly belong to the elite, and Mrs Elton is showing Jane a world to which she can never really belong, no matter how many parties and balls she attends. In addition to her annoyance at Mrs Elton's relationship with Jane, Emma finds Mrs Elton an "upstart", "under-bred" and "vulgar", which adds venom to the dispute between the two women. Mrs Elton is only a first generation gentry, as her father bought the land that she grew up on with money he had raised in trade. Her snobbery is therefore that of a nouveau riche, desperately insecure about her status. When Mrs Elton boasted that her family had owned their estate for a number of years, Emma responds that a true English gentry family would count ownership of their estate in generations, not years.

Of Emma's two rivals for social authority, one shares a common class while the other a common sex. The marriage of Emma to Mr Knightley consolidates her social authority by linking herself to the dominant male of Highbury and pushes Mrs Elton's claims aside. Irvine wrote: "On this view, and in contrast to Austen's two previous novels, Emma works to legitimate established gentry power defined in opposition to an autonomous feminine authority over the regulation of social relations, and not through the vindication of such autonomous authority." However, as the novel goes, such a reading is countered by the way that Emma begins to take in the previously excluded into the realm of the elite, such as visiting the poor Miss Bates and her mother, and the Coles, whose wealth stems from trade. Likewise, Jane Fairfax, who is too poor to live off her wealth and must work as a governess, which excludes her from the female social elite of Highbury, does marry well after all, which makes her story the only one of real feminine worth triumphing over the lack of wealth in Emma.

=== Gender reversal ===
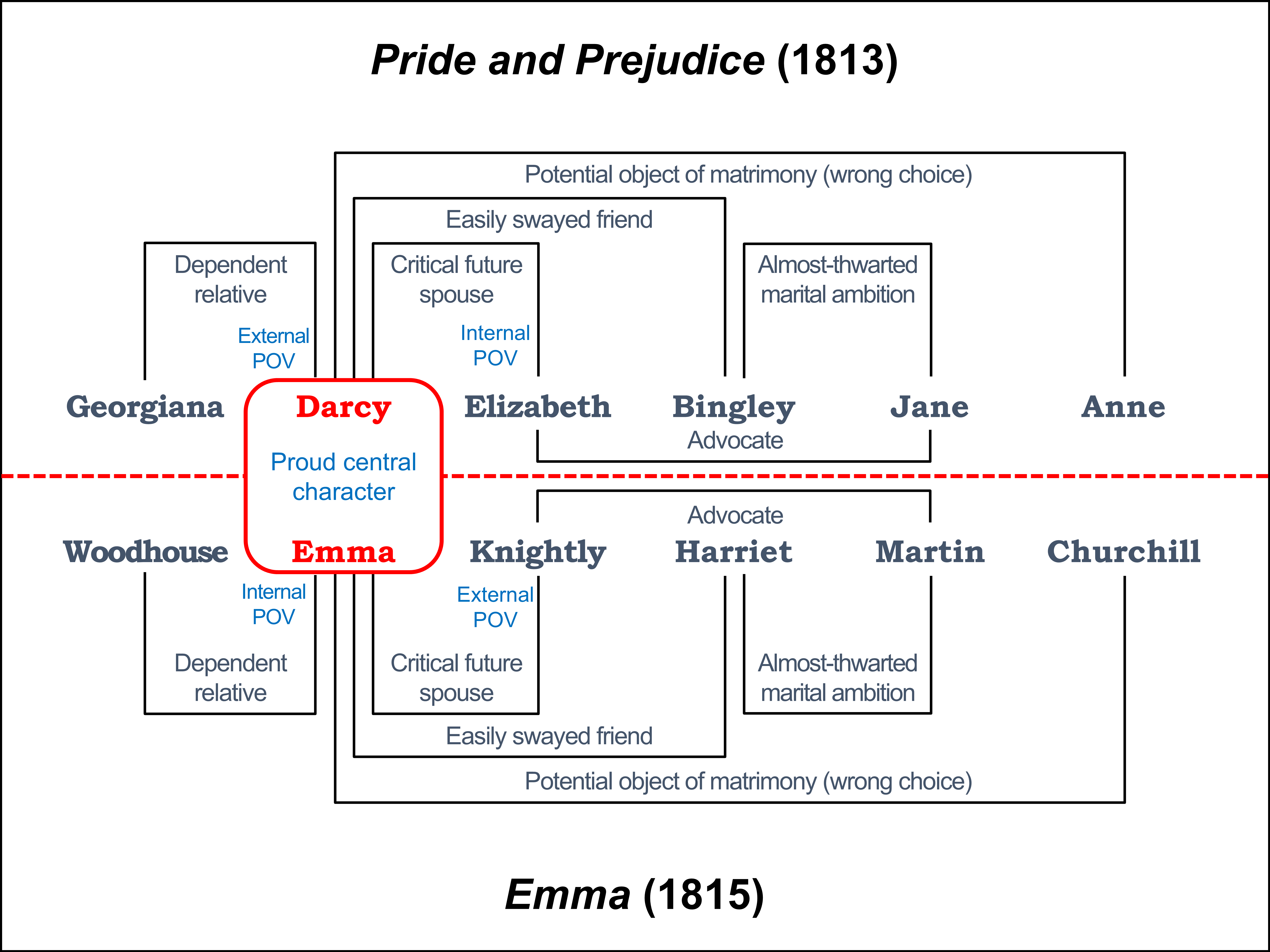
Diagram of gender reversals in Emma and Pride and Prejudice

There are numerous parallels between the main characters and plots of Pride and Prejudice and Emma: Both novels feature a proud central character, respectively, Darcy and Emma; a critical future spouse, Elizabeth and Mr Knightley; an easily swayed friend, Bingley and Harriet; an almost-thwarted marital ambition, Jane and Martin; a dependent relative, Georgiana and Mr Woodhouse; and a potential object of matrimony who is a wrong choice for the central character, Anne de Bourgh and Frank Churchill. These pairs suggest that Emma may have been a gendered reversal of the earlier novel. Such reversals were familiar to Austen through the works of favoured authors like Samuel Richardson, Henry Fielding and William Shakespeare.

Austen is thought to have switched gender in some of her earlier work as well. Her cousin Eliza Hancock may have been her inspiration for the character Edward Stanley in "Catharine, or the Bower", one of her youthful pieces, showing her the "trick of changing the gender of her prototype." In Pride and Prejudice, Thomas Lefroy, a charming and witty Irishman, may have been the basis for Elizabeth's personality, while Austen may have used herself as the model for Darcy's reserve and self-consciousness when among company, but open and loving demeanor when among close friends and family. Austen's selection of Pride and Prejudice as the basis for reversing gender in Emma may have been motivated by these earlier experiences and insights.

Reversing the genders of Pride and Prejudice in Emma allowed Austen to disturb paradigms and examine the different expectations society had of men and women; the elements she chose to include in Emma and how she chose to revise them yield a powerful but ultimately conventional commentary on the status of women. The novel's central concern with gender is often noted in the literature as themes like gendered space, romance, female empowerment, wealth, parenting, and masculinity.

=== Gendered space ===
Wiltshire wrote about Austen's use of "gendered space" in Emma, noting the female characters have a disproportionate number of scenes in the drawing rooms of Highbury while the male characters often have scenes outdoors. Wiltshire noted that Jane Fairfax cannot walk to the post office in the rain to pick up the mail without becoming the object of village gossip while Mr Knightley can ride all the way to London without attracting any gossip. Wiltshire described the world that the women of Highbury live in as a sort of prison, writing that in the novel "... women's imprisonment is associated with deprivation, with energies and powers perverted in their application, and events, balls and outings are linked with the arousal and satisfaction of desire". In addition to Wiltshire’s observations, critics have noted that Austen’s depiction of gendered spaces in Emma reflects the limited public agency available to women of her class. Claudia L. Johnson has argued that Emma’s frequent presence in drawing rooms and parlors highlights how Regency‑era women’s influence was largely confined to domestic and semi‑domestic spheres, while men like Mr Knightley navigate both private and public arenas without scrutiny. These spatial divisions are not merely settings but serve as symbolic boundaries that shape each character’s opportunities and constraints. For instance, Emma’s attempts at matchmaking and social maneuvering take place almost entirely within these indoor, community‑oriented spaces, reinforcing the notion that her power is relational rather than institutional. Scholars have suggested that Austen uses these contrasts between interior and exterior spaces to critique the rigid social structures of her time and to highlight the subtle forms of influence women could exert within the limitations imposed on them.

=== Nationhood and the "Irish Question" ===
The novel is set in England, but there are several references to Ireland, which were related to the ongoing national debate about the "Irish Question". In 1801, the Act of Union had brought Ireland into the United Kingdom, but there was a major debate about what was Ireland's precise status in the United Kingdom; another kingdom, province, or a colony? Austen satirizes this debate by having Miss Bates talk about Mrs Dixon's new house in Ireland, a place that she cannot decide is a kingdom, a country, or a province, but is merely very "strange" whatever its status may be. Austen also satirized the vogue for "Irish tales" that became popular after the Act of Union as English writers started to produce picturesque, romantic stories set in Ireland to familiarize the English people with the newest addition to the United Kingdom. The travel itinerary that Miss Bates sketches out for the Campbells' visit to Ireland is satire of a typical "Irish tale" novel, which was Austen's way of mocking those who had a superficial appreciation of Irish culture by buying the "Irish tales" books that presented Ireland in a very stereotypical way. Austen further alludes to the Society of United Irishmen uprising in 1798 by having the other characters worry about what might happen to the Dixons when they visit a place in the Irish countryside called "Baly-craig", which appears to be Ballycraig in County Antrim in what is now Northern Ireland, which had been the scene of much bloody fighting between the United Irishmen Society and the Crown in 1798, an enduring testament to Ireland's unsettled status with much of the Irish population not accepting British rule. The American scholar Colleen Taylor wrote about Austen's treatment of the "Irish Question": that "Emma applies a distant and fictionalized Irish space to her very limited and dissimilar English circle, turning a somewhat ordinary English young woman, Jane Fairfax, into an Irish scandal, proves that the object of English humor is—for once—not the stage Irishman but the privileged English woman who presumes to know what he and his culture are really like."

=== Romance ===
In contrast to other Austen heroines, Emma seems immune to romantic attraction, at least until her final self-revelation concerning her true affections. Unlike Marianne Dashwood, who is attracted to the wrong man before she settles on the right one, Emma generally shows no romantic interest in the men she meets and even her flirting with Churchill seems tame. She is genuinely surprised (and somewhat disgusted) when Mr Elton declares his love for her, much in the way Elizabeth Bennet reacts to the obsequious Mr Collins, also a parson. Her fancy for Frank Churchill represents more of a longing for a little drama in her life than a longing for romantic love. For example, at the beginning of Chapter XIII, Emma has "no doubt of her being in love", but it quickly becomes clear that, even though she spends time "forming a thousand amusing schemes for the progress and close of their attachment", we are told that "the conclusion of every imaginary declaration on his side was that she refused him".

It is only Mr Knightley who can willingly share the burden of Emma's father, as well as providing her with guidance, love and companionship. He has been in love with her since she was 13 years old, but neither he nor she have realized that there is a natural bond between them. He declares his love for her: "What did she say? Just what she ought, of course. A lady always does."

=== Female empowerment ===
In Emma, Emma Woodhouse serves as a direct reflection of Jane Austen's feminist characterization of female heroines, in terms of both female individuality and independence (romantically, financially, etc.). In terms of romantic independence, Emma's father, Henry Woodhouse, very consistently preaches against the idea of marriage. He plays an integral role in Emma's own initial perception of matrimony, leading her to make use of her free time by becoming the town "matchmaker", which leaves her happily single and unwed for the majority of the novel. One of the predominant reasons Emma is able to live a comfortable and independent lifestyle is her gifted inheritance—given to her by a past family member—which allows her to depend on no one other than herself for a sustainable, wealthy, and self-sufficient life although she currently lives in her father's house. Austen portrays Emma as educated and capable, and extremely popular and well-liked in her hometown of Highbury.

Literary scholar Laurence Mazzeno addresses Austen's narrative in regard to female individualism and empowerment, stating, "… Austen deals honestly and with skill in treating relationships between men and women, and presents women of real passion – but not the flamboyant, sentimental kind that populate conventional romances ... Austen is not 'narrow' in her treatment of character, either; her men and women furnish as broad a view of humanity as would be obtained by traveling up and down the world ... Austen was conservative in both her art and her politics – suggesting that, even from a woman's point of view, Austen was hardly out to subvert the status quo."

In the Bedford Edition of Emma edited by Alistair M. Duckworth, there are five essays to accompany the text that discuss contemporary critical perspectives, one of which is about feminist criticism. The feminist criticism essay was written by Devoney Looser. In her essay, she asks the question whether Jane Austen was a feminist. She also states in her essay that one's answer to the question not only depends on how one understands Austen's novels, but also how one defines feminism.

Looser states that if you define feminism broadly as a movement relating to how women are limited and devalued within a culture then Austen's work applies to this concept of feminism. She states that if you define feminism as a movement to eradicate gender, race, class, and sexual prejudice and to agitate for change, then Austen's work does not really apply to this concept of feminism.

=== Wealth ===
Emma is a wealthy young woman, having a personal fortune amounting to £30,000. This would be sufficient for her to live independently in the same style as she is accustomed to. As she herself points out, this means that there is no financial pressure on her to marry. This is in sharp contrast to the heroines of Austen's other novels, who all lack sufficient resources to maintain as single women the lifestyle in which they have been raised by their families. This means that Emma has greater freedom of choice and behaviour, in some ways closer to that exercised by wealthy men of the time.

=== Parenting ===
Mr Woodhouse adopted a laissez-faire parenting style when it came to raising Emma. In fact, most of the time it seems that Emma is parenting her father, taking on the role of both daughter and mother. Emma feels entirely responsible for the wellbeing of her father and therefore feels obliged to stay with him. Her father is a selfish but gentle man and does not approve of matrimony. If Emma were to marry he would lose his primary carer. This is not to say that Emma feels restrained by her father, in fact quite the opposite, Emma has the power over the world she inhabits. The narrator announces at the start of the novel: "The real evils of Emma's situation were the power of having rather too much of her own way, and a disposition to think a little too well of herself; these were the disadvantages which threatened alloy to her many enjoyments" (Austen, 1). Although Mr Woodhouse is lacking as a father figure, Mr Knightley acts as a surrogate father to Emma. Mr Knightley is not afraid to correct Emma's behaviour and tell her what she needs to hear. Mr Knightley reprimands Emma when he learns of her match-making and also later when Emma is extremely rude to Miss Bates. Still, the reader cannot ignore the developmental damage that has been caused by Mr Woodhouse's indifferent parenting style as Emma struggles to form healthy adult relationships.

=== Class ===
Class is an important aspect of the novel. The distinctions between the classes are made explicitly clear to the reader by Emma herself and by Austen's descriptions. The social class structure has the Woodhouses and Mr Knightley at the top, the Eltons, the Westons, Frank Churchill, and even further down the line Harriet, Robert Martin, and the Bates family including Jane Fairfax. This social class map becomes important when Emma tries to match Mr Elton and Harriet together. Harriet is not considered a match for Elton due to her lowly class standing, despite what Emma encourages her to believe. Emma's initial disregard for class standing (as regards Harriet at least) is brought to light by Mr Knightley who tells her to stop encouraging Harriet.

The scholar James Brown argued that the much quoted line where Emma contemplates the Abbey-Mill Farm, which is the embodiment of "English verdure, English culture, English comfort, seen under a sun bright, without being oppressive" is in fact meant to be ironic. Brown wrote that Austen had a strong appreciation of the land as not only a source of aesthetic pleasure, but also a source of money, an aspect of pre-industrial England that many now miss. In this sense, the beauty of the Abbey-Mill Farm is due to the hard work of Mr Knightley's tenant, the farmer Robert Martin, a man whom Emma dismisses as the sort of person "with whom I feel I can have nothing to do", while Knightley praises him as "open, straight forward, and very well judging". Brown argued that the disconnect between Emma's contempt for Mr Martin as a person and her awe at the beauty that is the result of his hard work was Austen's way of mocking those in the upper classes who failed to appreciate the farmers who worked the land.

=== Food ===
There is an abundance of food language in Emma. Food is given, shared, and eaten by characters in almost every chapter. Much research on Jane Austen's food language is found in Maggie Lane's book titled Jane Austen and Food. Lane's text provides a general examination of the symbolism of food in Emma and invites further interpretations. Food is used as a symbol to convey class hierarchy, stereotypes and biases throughout the novel. The language and actions that surround food bring the characters of Highbury's inner circle closer together. For Emma Woodhouse, food is a symbol of human interdependence and goodwill. No one in Highbury is starving; everyone takes part in the giving and receiving of food. However, food is a strong class divider though it is rarely openly discussed by characters in the novel. There are a few instances when characters allude to lower class individuals outside of their well-fed society. For instance, when Emma discusses her charitable visit with a poor family, Harriet's encounter with the gypsy children, and Highbury's mysterious chicken thieves. For the most part, the poor in Emma are overlooked by the characters in the novel due to their socioeconomic status.

The constant giving and receiving of food in the novel does not occur without motive. Characters are either trying to climb the social ladder or gain the approval or affections of another. The interpretation of the giving and receiving of food in Emma can be taken in these different directions; however in terms of love: "The novel ... is stuffed with gifts of food: Mr Knightley sends the Bates family apples; Mr Martin woos Harriet with some walnuts; and, to further her son's suit, Mrs Martin brings Mrs Goddard a goose". "These gifts are not without motive, and food—as it pertains to Emma Woodhouse—only becomes interesting when it pertains to love...[R]omance is a far more interesting subject than food. Emma quickly reduces the topic of eating to a run of the mill 'any thing,' an arbitrary and empty screen that only becomes interesting when projected on by those in love". This becomes evident to the reader when Emma overestimates Mr Elton's affections for Harriet from their engaging in conversation about the food at the Cole's party. Emma Woodhouse interprets food conversation and gifts of food as means of affection between two lovers.

=== Masculinity ===
Austen explores the idea of redefining manhood and masculinity with her male characters: particularly Mr Knightley, Mr Woodhouse, and Frank Churchill. In Emma, Austen includes typical ideals of English masculinity, including, "familial responsibility, sexual fidelity, and leadership transition …" Mr Woodhouse is portrayed chiefly as foolish and an incompetent father figure. Clark comments on Mr Woodhouse's age and how this affects his masculine identity. He resists change and pleasure, yet he is still respected in the community. Mr Knightley is Jane Austen's perfect gentleman figure in Emma. He has manners, class, and money. Further, he is presented as, "a well-adjusted alternative to these more polarized understandings of masculinity seen in characters of John Willoughby and Edward Ferrars."

== Allusions to real places ==
The fictional Highbury is said to be in Surrey, 16 miles (26 km) from London and 8 miles (13 km) from Richmond. (It is not to be confused with the real Highbury, which is 4.5 miles (7.2 km) north of Charing Cross, now part of inner London but in Austen's day was in Middlesex.) Highbury was not modelled on a specific village; however, it is likely that it is modelled after several places that Austen knew, such as Cobham and Box Hill. Leatherhead is another place that could have been a source of inspiration for Highbury. There is a Randalls Road in the town, which is an important name within Emma. It has also been noted that there is a Mr Knightly mentioned in Leatherhead Church. Emma's sister Isabella and her family live in Brunswick Square, between the City of London and the West End; the fields had just been transformed at the turn of the century into terraces of Georgian houses. Richmond, where Frank Churchill's aunt and uncle settle in the summer, is now part of the Greater London area, but was then a separate town in Surrey.

Most of the other places mentioned are in southern England, such as the seaside resort towns of Weymouth, Dorset, Southend, and Cromer in Norfolk. Box Hill is still a place of beauty, popular for picnics. Bath, where Mr Elton went to find a bride, is a well-known spa city in the southwest. The place furthest away is the fictional Enscombe, the estate of the Churchills, in the real Yorkshire, in the north.

The school is based on Reading Abbey Girls' School, which Austen and her sister attended briefly:

not of a seminary, or an establishment, or any thing which professed, in long sentences of refined nonsense, to combine liberal acquirements with elegant morality upon new principles and new systems – and where young ladies for enormous pay might be screwed out of health and into vanity – but a real, honest, old-fashioned Boarding-school, where a reasonable quantity of accomplishments were sold at a reasonable price, and where girls might be sent to be out of the way and scramble themselves into a little education, without any danger of coming back prodigies.

== Adaptations ==
Emma has been the subject of many adaptations for film, TV, radio and the stage. The profusion of adaptations based on Jane Austen's novels has not only created a large fan base today but has also sparked extensive scholarly examination on both the process and effect of modernizing the narratives and moving them between mediums. Examples of this critical, academic work can be found in texts such as Recreating Jane Austen by John Wiltshire, Jane Austen in Hollywood edited by Troost and Greenfield, Jane Austen and Co.: Remaking the Past in Contemporary Culture edited by Pucci and Thompson, and "Adapting Jane Austen: The Surprising Fidelity of 'Clueless'" by William Galperin to name a few.

=== Film ===
- 1995: Clueless, a loose American modern adaptation of the novel, set in Beverly Hills and starring Alicia Silverstone as Cher Horowitz (Emma)
- 1996: Emma, an American comedy starring Gwyneth Paltrow
- 2010: Aisha, an Indian modern adaptation of the novel, starring Sonam Kapoor as Aisha (Emma)
- 2020: Emma, (Note: The title of the film has a period attached to signify it being a period piece.) a British adaptation by Eleanor Catton and directed by Autumn de Wilde, starring Anya Taylor-Joy as Emma Woodhouse and Johnny Flynn as Mr Knightley

=== Television ===
- 1948: Emma, live BBC TV broadcast, starring Judy Campbell (who also wrote the screenplay) as Emma, and directed and produced by Michael Barry. No recording of this production is known to exist, but several still photographs have survived.
- 1954: Emma, live NBC TV broadcast, starring Felicia Montealegre as Emma.
- 1957: Emma, another live NBC TV broadcast in their Matinee Theater series, starring Sarah Churchill as Emma.
- 1960: Emma, live BBC TV serial in six parts, starring Diana Fairfax as Emma and directed by Campbell Logan. All episodes are believed to be lost.
- 1960: Emma, live CBS TV broadcast in their Camera Three series, starring Nancy Wickwire as Emma.
- 1967: Emma, a five-part Spanish miniseries by TVE, starring Lola Cardona as Emma.
- 1972: Emma, a six-part BBC serial, starring Doran Godwin as Emma. Earliest BBC adaptation known to survive in recorded form.
- 1996: Emma, an ITV TV film, starring Kate Beckinsale as Emma.
- 2009: Emma, a four-part BBC drama, starring Romola Garai as Emma.
- 2021: Lights, Camera, Romance: Emma Hutton, played by Monica Moore Smith, is inspired by the character Emma Woodhouse.

=== Web ===
- 2013: Emma Approved, a YouTube web series produced by Pemberley Digital and developed by Bernie Su, starring Joanna Sotomura as Emma.

=== Stage ===
- 1991: Emma, a stage adaptation by British playwright Michael Fry, first produced by the Cloucester Stage Company in 1991, and since then produced by a number of theatre companies in Britain and the US.
- 2000: Emma, a musical written by Stephen Karam and first performed by the Brownbrokers student theatre group at Brown University under the direction of Darius Pierce. In 2004 Karam's musical was put on at the New York Musical Theatre Festival under the direction of Patricia Birch.
- 2000: A theatrical adaptation by Michael Napier Brown was performed at the Royal Theatre in Northampton.
- 2007: Jane Austen's Emma – A Musical Romantic Comedy, a musical written by Paul Gordon, which premiered at TheatreWorks in Menlo Park, California. It has since been performed at the Cincinnati Playhouse, The Repertory Theatre of St. Louis and the Old Globe Theatre in San Diego.
- 2009: Emma, a stage adaption by Rachel Atkins for the Book-It Repertory Theatre in Seattle, directed by Marcus Goodwin with Sylvie Davidson in the title role.
- 2022: Emma, a stage adaption by Kate Hamill for the Guthrie Theater in Minneapolis, directed by Meredith McDonough, who later directed the same adaptation for its run at the Oregon Shakespeare Festival.
- 2025: Emma, a stage adaptation by Ava Pickett for the Rose Theatre, Kingston, directed by Christopher Haydon, starring Amelia Kenworthy and Kit Young. This version is set in contemporary Essex.

=== Fiction ===
- Joan Aiken wrote a companion novel, Jane Fairfax: The Secret Story of the Second Heroine in Jane Austen's Emma.
- Alexander McCall Smith wrote a detective version, titled Emma: A Modern Retelling (2014), as part of HarperCollins' six volume Austen Project.
- Reginald Hill wrote Poor Emma in 1987, included in the collection There Are No Ghosts in the Soviet Union, where finance plays a crucial role.
- The Matchmaker: An Amish Retelling of Jane Austen's Emma (2015) by Sarah Price.
- MISS BATES: “Emma Revisited (2026) by Catherine Cliff.

== Critical editions ==
- Jane Austen, Emma (Wordsworth Classics, 2000), ed. Nicola Bradbury, ISBN 978-1853260285
- Jane Austen, Emma (ed James Kingsley); introduction and notes by Adela Pinch; appendices by Vivien Jones; series: Oxford World Classics (OUP 1998, 2003, reiss 2008); ISBN 978-0-19-953552-1

== Bibliography ==
- Cano, Marina (2017). Jane Austen and Performance. Cham, Switzerland: Palgrave Macmillan. Especially Chapter 5 "Re-inscribing Emma". ISBN 978-3-319-43987-7.
