= John Glenister =

British television director (1932–2024)

- Born: 12 October 1932
- Died: November 2024 (aged 92)
- Occupation: Television director
- Spouse: Joan Fry Lewis (m. 1958)
- Children: Philip Glenister; Robert Glenister

John Glenister (12 October 1932 – November 2024) was an English television director. His credits included The Six Wives of Henry VIII, Emma, Rumpole of the Bailey, Play for Today, Dennis Potter's 1971 biopic of Casanova, Marie Curie, A Touch of Frost, Alan Plater's On Your Way, Riley, Hetty Wainthropp Investigates, A Bit of a Do, Wycliffe and Frank Stubbs Promotes.

Glenister died in November 2024, at the age of 92. His sons, Robert Glenister (born 1960) and Philip Glenister (born 1963), became actors.
