= George Knightley =

Principal character in the novel Emma by Jane Austen

- Emma character
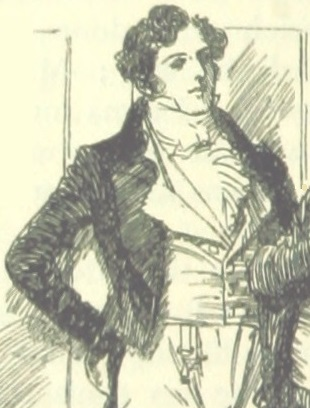
- George Knightley as depicted in an illustration by Hugh Thomson for an 1896 edition of Emma
- Created by: Jane Austen

In-universe information
- Gender: Male
- Occupation: Landed gentleman
- Spouse: Emma Woodhouse
- Relatives: John Knightley
- Home: Donwell Abbey; after he marries, Hartfield

George Knightley is a principal character depicted by Jane Austen in her novel Emma, published in 1815. He is a landowner and gentleman farmer, though "having little spare money". A lifetime friend of Emma and her father though nearly seventeen years older than she, he is one of the only characters willing to correct her when he believes her to be doing wrong.

== Character ==
Mr. Knightley is often put as the voice of common sense in Emma and is characterized with sarcasm, observation, and morality. He comes often in conflict with Emma Woodhouse due to differences in opinion regarding social structures and the true purposes of the other characters, notably in the instances regarding Harriet Smith and Frank Churchill. He falls in love with Emma, but that never clouds his judgement regarding her behavior and decisions. An upper-class gentleman, he is a magistrate, owns extensive farmland, and is a leading figure in the Highbury parish.

Despite a certain sharpness of tongue, his genuine qualities are revealed, for example, by his disappointment when he sees Emma insult Miss Bates, a spinster of modest means. Mr. Knightley's reprimand of Emma for this insult also demonstrates his affection and esteem for her as a friend. Another revealing incident is his anger with Emma for persuading Harriet Smith to refuse Robert Martin's proposal of marriage, Martin being in Knightley's eyes an eminently suitable husband for Harriet. The row that follows leaves the pair estranged for a time. While in some respects serving as a conduct book mentor for Emma, Knightley learns from his own desire for Emma and his jealousy-fuelled blunders, that brings the characters into a more realistic, egalitarian relationship, just as in their marriage her money will complement his role as the leading local landowner.

== Role in narrative ==
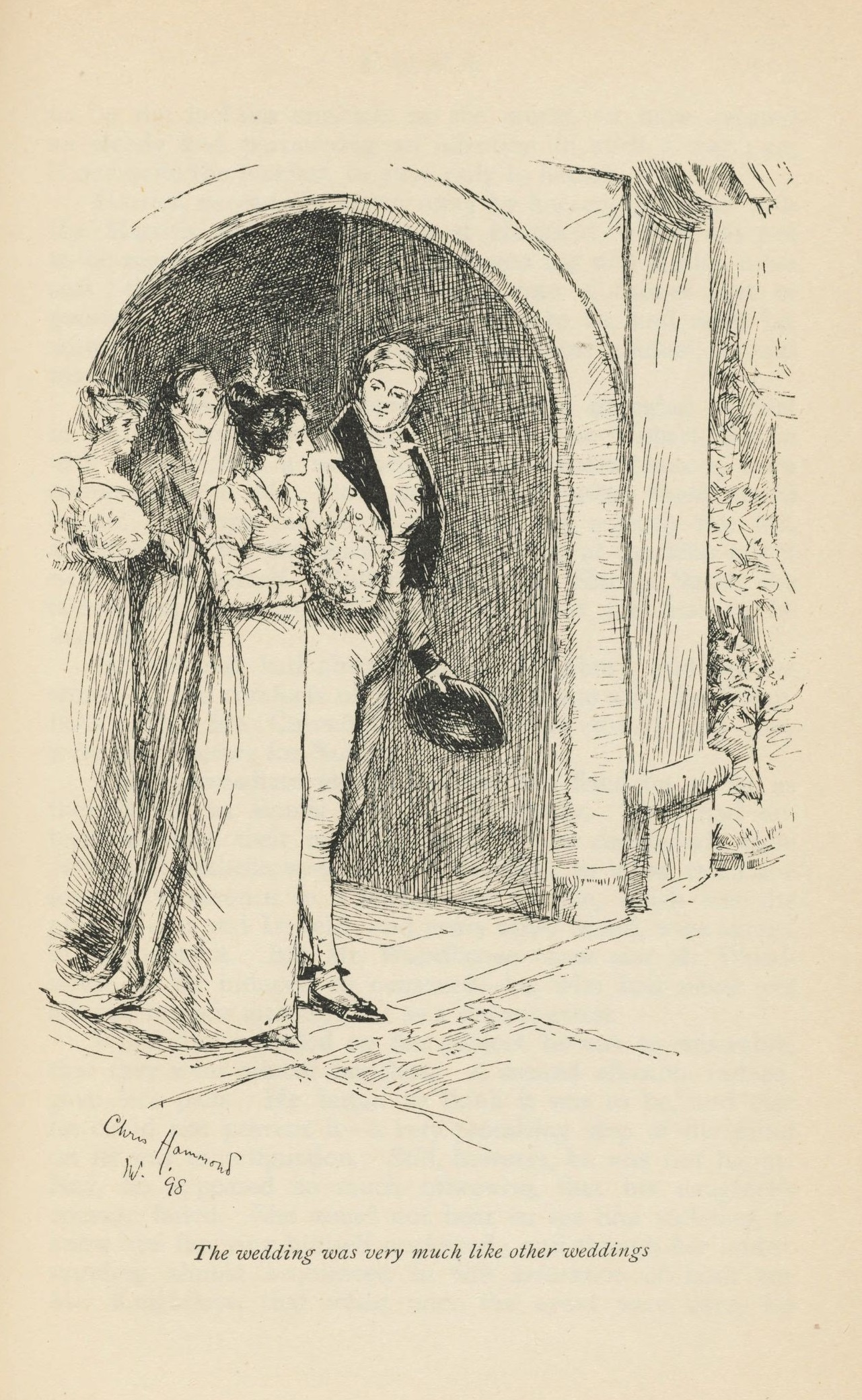
1898 illustration of the wedding of George Knightley and Emma Woodhouse

In the course of the story, Emma believes that she falls briefly in love with a young, handsome man named Frank Churchill. Mr. Knightley's jealousy of the latter is gradually uncovered: he makes several negative remarks about Churchill, and is concerned that Frank has had a negative influence on Emma, but later admits that, because of jealousy, "I was not quite impartial in my judgement...My Emma". Frank Churchill's guardian—his aunt—dies, and he is now free to publicise his engagement to Jane Fairfax, which had been kept secret to avoid his domineering aunt's disapproval. Emma is shocked, but realises she had never really had romantic sentiments towards Frank Churchill. Nevertheless, she worries that Harriet has feelings for Frank, but soon discovers that Harriet has become infatuated with Mr. Knightley.

Emma becomes very unhappy; finally it dawns on her that she loves Mr. Knightley—and has for a time, apparently unconsciously—and is distressed as she believes Mr. Knightley and Harriet to be on the verge of marriage. Mr. Knightley is in London, visiting his brother John and sister-in-law Isabella (Emma's sister), when he is apprised of Churchill's clandestine engagement. He decided to return to Hartfield to offer support to Emma, whom he believes to be in love with Mr. Churchill. On the spur of the moment, after finding this to be untrue, he declares his love to Emma and asks her to marry him, and she accepts. Harriet and Robert Martin marry; Jane Fairfax and Frank Churchill plan a November wedding. Within a month, Emma and Mr. Knightley marry and, because Emma's father Mr. Woodhouse cannot face life without his daughter, Mr. Knightley moves in with Emma and her father at the Woodhouse estate, Hartfield.

== Notable portrayals ==
- John Carson in the 1972 TV serial
- Paul Rudd's character in the 1995 film Clueless, Josh Lucas, is based on George Knightley.
- Jeremy Northam in the 1996 American film
- Mark Strong in the 1996 British TV film
- Jonny Lee Miller in the 2009 BBC TV serial
- Abhay Deol in the 2010 Hindi adaptation, Aisha
- Brent Bailey in the 2013 modernized adaptation, Emma Approved
- Jeff Lowe in the 2018 musical Jane Austen's EMMA, The Musical
- Johnny Flynn in the 2020 film
