= Doran Godwin =

British actress

Doran Godwin (born 18 May 1944) is a British actress.

Godwin has appeared extensively on both TV and in the theatre. She is mainly known for her roles as Erica Bayliss in the television detective series Shoestring and as Philippa Yeates in The Irish R.M., opposite Peter Bowles. She also played the title role in a BBC television production of Emma (1972).

== Television ==
Year	Title	Role	Notes
1967	Softly, Softly	Receptionist	1 episode: Material Evidence
1971	The Search for the Nile	Louisa Segrave	1 episode: The Dream of the Wanderer
1972	Emma	Emma Woodhouse	6 eposodes; lead character
1972-1973	Harriet's Back in Town	Dorothy Brown	Thames Television, 20 episodes
1974; 1976	Rooms	Helen Vosper/Marcia	6 episodes
1975	Dave Allen at large		7 episodes
1978	Armchair Thriller	Sister Lucy	6 episodes: Quiet as a Nun
1978	The Upchat Connection	Christine	ITV series by Keith Waterhouse
1979-1980	Shoestring	Erica Bayliss	21 episodes
1982	Crown Court	Emily Coleman	3 episodes
1983	Rumpole of the Bailey	Miss Claymore	1 episode
1983-1985	The Irish R.M.	Philippa Yeates	Channel Four, 12 episodes
1986	Lord Mountbatten: The Last Viceroy	Elizabeth Ward	1 episode
1988	Game, Set and Match	Daphne Cruyer	5 episodes
1995	The Plant	Connie's Mother	British television movie
