= Emma Woodhouse =

- Emma character
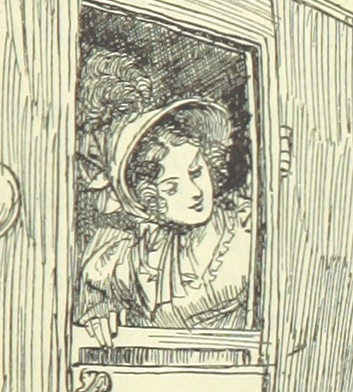
- Emma in an illustration by Hugh Thomson from an 1896 edition of the novel
- Created by: Jane Austen

In-universe information
- Family: Henry Woodhouse (father); Isabella Knightley (sister)
- Spouse: George Knightley
- Relatives: Henry Knightley (nephew); John Knightley (nephew); Bella Knightley (niece); Emma Knightley (niece); George Knightley (nephew)
- Home: Hartfield

Emma Woodhouse is the 20-year-old titular protagonist of Jane Austen's 1815 novel Emma. She is described in the novel's opening sentence as "handsome, clever, and rich, with a comfortable home and a happy disposition... and had lived nearly twenty-one years in the world with very little to distress or vex her." Jane Austen, while writing the novel, called Emma, "a heroine whom no-one but myself will much like."

Emma is an independent, wealthy woman who lives with her father in their home, Hartfield, in the English countryside near the Surrey village of Highbury. Her elder sister Isabella has married and moved away. The novel concerns her attempts to be a matchmaker among her acquaintances, and her own romantic misadventures.

Although Emma will inherit a settled dowry of £30,000 when she comes of age, she professes that she does not ever wish to marry (unless she falls very much in love); and she has no financial need to because she can expect a further substantial future inheritance (which would be shared with her sister) and does not wish to leave her father alone. After a series of new acquaintances, visits at Highbury, and much miscommunication, Emma finds herself in love with her neighbour, her sister's brother-in-law George Knightley.

== Characteristics ==
Intelligent and self-assured, Emma takes after her deceased mother, possessing a sharper mind than either her father or sister, yet lacking the discipline to practise or study anything in depth. While she is compassionate to the poor and an active member of society, her strong sense of class status leads her to be prejudiced in regards to the "upwardly mobile" families of Highbury, such as the Martins or Coles, whom she believes ought not to be equated with the gentry in terms of social standing.

While she is capable of being extremely affectionate, patient and devoted to those she holds dear, Emma often behaves in a frivolous or selfish way, and shows a lack of consideration for her friends and neighbours. She carelessly manipulates the life of her friend Harriet Smith, neglects her acquaintance Jane Fairfax, and insults the poor and dependent Miss Bates. However, her friends, especially Mrs Weston and George Knightley, see potential in her to improve herself and become a better person, which Emma, through her own self-realisation and willingness to change, achieves by the end of the novel.

== Relationships ==
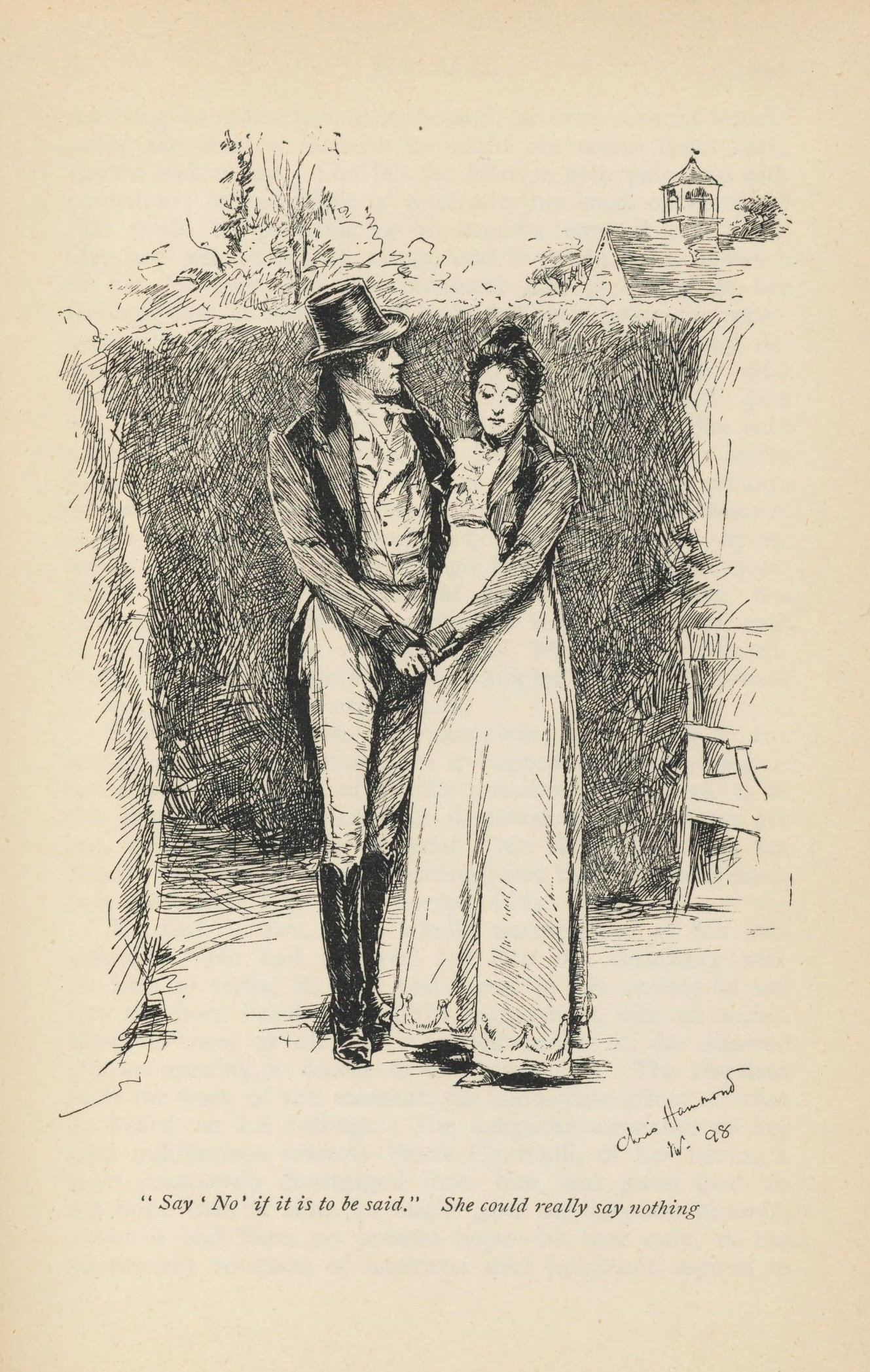
Emma and Mr Knightley in an illustration by Chris Hammond from an 1898 edition

George Knightley is Emma's friend, brother-in-law of her sister Isabella, and ultimately her love interest. At 37, he is significantly older than Emma, and she looks up to him. He often gives her advice and guidance, particularly since Emma's mother is long-dead and her father lacks a firm character. Mr Knightley has a strong moral compass and frequently teases or scolds Emma for her more frivolous pursuits, such as matchmaking. He also disagrees and argues with Emma on occasion, notably about Emma's interference with Harriet Smith and Robert Martin's relationship. Knightley spends most evenings with Emma and her father, taking the short walk from his home to theirs.

Due to his attachment to Emma, Mr Knightley has disliked Frank Churchill (unconsciously labelling him as competition) even before he met Frank, and remains doubtful of him even when everyone else indulges the younger man. It is also his jealousy of Frank that causes Mr Knightley to acknowledge his romantic feelings for Emma. Although he is mostly rational, he can also act more impulsively in relation to Emma, such as making a sudden visit to London and returning in an equally unexpected manner to propose to her. Emma, too, gradually realises her feelings for him due to her jealousy first of Jane Fairfax and later of Harriet Smith.

Harriet Smith is an illegitimate and poor pupil at the local boarding school, of whom Emma takes notice after she loses the companionship of Mrs Weston when her former governess marries. Despite Harriet's humble origins, Emma admires her sweetness, good nature, and pleasant looks. Emma decides to take Harriet under her wing and help her find a good husband. However, Emma's pride prevents her from recognising a good match for Harriet in the person of Robert Martin, a respected farmer and the initial and ultimate romantic interest of Harriet. Instead, Emma encourages Harriet to believe that she is admired by Mr Elton, Highbury's vicar, which ends disastrously. Nevertheless, naive Harriet does not blame Emma for her mortification, and the two remain friends.

Meanwhile, unbeknownst to Emma, Harriet develops a crush on Mr Knightley after he asks her to dance when Mr Elton has refused to dance with Harriet when prompted. Emma, who believes that Harriet holds a secret regard for Frank after he has rescued her from being attacked, says that she should not give up hope because there have been many other happy although unequal matches. When Emma discovers the truth as to whom Harriet wishes to marry, she is both appalled and dismayed, which leads to her realisation that she is in love with Knightley herself.

Mrs Elton's domineering relationship to Jane Fairfax parodies Emma's relationship to Harriet.

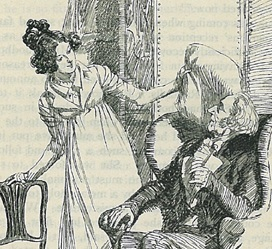
Emma with her father in an illustration by Hugh Thomson

Mr Woodhouse, Emma's father, is a valetudinarian and is paranoid about his own and others' health. He is against eating cake, going outside, attending parties, and marriage, among other things, on the grounds that these might damage the health. Mr Woodhouse is fond of and attached to his daughters, who are likewise affectionate toward him. With his elder daughter Isabella married to Mr Knightley's lawyer brother John and living in London, Emma has taken it upon herself to remain at Hartfield and take care of her father. Emma's consideration towards her father is one of her redeeming attributes.

Mrs Weston, formerly Miss Taylor, was Emma's governess before she married Mr Weston. She and Emma love each other and are close friends. She serves as a mother figure for Emma and often gives her advice, which is not always taken. Emma admires Mrs Weston as wise and virtuous. When Mrs Weston marries, Emma becomes lonely and therefore seeks the companionship of Harriet Smith, a friendship which Mrs Weston approves of, although Mr Knightley does not. Mrs Weston initially wished for a match between Emma and Frank Churchill (who is her stepson), and foresaw a potential attachment between George Knightley and Jane Fairfax; she ends up surprised by, yet delighted with, the ultimate outcome.

Jane Fairfax, orphaned at a young age, is Miss Bates' niece. She is a beautiful, accomplished young woman, who represents in character everything that Emma should be. Jane is regarded by others as the ideal companion for Emma. Emma neglects her due to jealousy, yet claims it is because Jane is cold and reserved. Unbeknownst to Emma, Jane is secretly engaged to Frank, and therefore Frank's flirtation with Emma causes Jane great pain.

== Notable portrayals ==
- Doran Godwin in the 1972 BBC TV serial
- Alicia Silverstone's character in the 1995 film Clueless, Cher Horowitz, is based on Emma Woodhouse
- Gwyneth Paltrow in the 1996 film.
- Kate Beckinsale in the 1996 television film.
- Romola Garai in the 2009 BBC TV serial
- Sonam Kapoor as Aisha Kapoor in the 2010 film Aisha
- Joanna Sotomura in the 2013 web series Emma Approved
- Anya Taylor-Joy in the 2020 film
