= Miss Bates =

- Emma character

In-universe information
- Occupation: Spinster
- Family: Mrs Bates

Miss Bates is a supporting character in Jane Austen's 1815 novel Emma. Genteel but poor, and a compulsive talker, she is memorably insulted on one occasion by the book's heroine, to the latter's almost immediate remorse.

== Background ==
Living in genteel poverty with her ageing widow of a mother and only one servant, Miss Bates was nonetheless on visiting terms with the best in Highbury society. At the same time, she was dependent on her neighbours for much support – pork from Mr Woodhouse, apples from Mr Knightley. Those who see Austen as painting uncritically a rural paradise should remember the latter's words to Emma: “She is poor; she has sunk from the comforts she was born to; and if she live to old age, must probably sink more”.

== Characteristics ==
Miss Bates has as her main characteristic an unending flow of trivial speech, freely associating from one unimportant event to another – something which was to make her an immediate comic success among Austen's first readership. Many of the clues to the book's intrigue are in fact artfully concealed and revealed within her verbose talk. Her speech is overtly a recognition of her grateful dependence on her neighbours, but it has also been seen, in its overwhelming impact on other characters, as almost tyrannical in its passive-aggressive self-assertion.

== Possible inspiration ==
Austen was, like Miss Bates, the unmarried daughter of a clergyman's widow, and, while she herself was notoriously silent in company, her letters by contrast have a rambling flow that has been compared to the speech of her creation, for example: “my coarse spot, I shall turn it into a petticoat very soon. - I wish you a Merry Christmas, but no compliments of the Season”.

While Austen has been seen as a possible model for Miss Bates, another unmarried woman, Miss Milles, who “talked on...for half an hour, using such odd expressions & so foolishly minute that I could hardly keep my countenance”, has also been suggested as a possible inspiration.

== Modern legacy ==
Miss Bates is reinterpreted in a 2026 novel, Miss Bates: Emma Revisited, by Catherine Cliff.

== See also ==
- Anna Livia Plurabelle
- Automatic writing
- Mr Jingle
