= Mr Weston =

- Emma character

In-universe information
- Spouse: 1) Miss Churchill 2) Miss Taylor
- Children: Frank Churchill
- Home: Randalls

Mr Weston is a supporting character in Jane Austen's novel Emma, written in 1815. He marries the governess of the heroine, Emma Woodhouse, and it is the arrival of his son, Frank Churchill, in Highbury that sets the events of the plot in motion.

== Background ==
Born into a local Highbury family, rising from trade into gentility – what Ronald Blythe called "the park-like nirvana...the comic idealization of the country gentleman state" – Mr Weston used a small inheritance to seek an upwardly mobile short-cut, joining the militia as a captain, and wooing and winning the daughter of a rich landed family, the Churchills. Unfortunately the pair were then disowned by the Churchills, and his wife's extravagance whittled away his fortune; until her death, and the handing over of their child to the Churchills, led him to join his brothers in trade in London.

Some decades later, financial success enabled him both to purchase a small estate, and to maintain the gentry lifestyle – wife, servants, carriage, hospitality, and fine wines – on the interest of his savings alone.

== Character ==
A shrewd, cheerful, lively and hospitable figure, Mr Weston is liked by one and all in Highbury: the only reservations expressed about him relate to his preference for society in general over strong family ties, and (on Emma's part) to a certain unrestricted sociability on his part.

== See also ==
- Cheeryble Brothers
- Mr Weston's Good Wine
