= Mr Woodhouse =

Character in Jane Austen's "Emma"

- Emma character
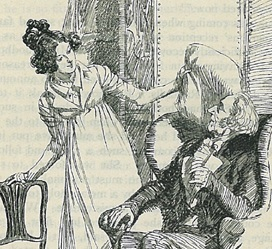
- Mr Woodhouse (right) with his daughter Emma in an illustration by Hugh Thomson

In-universe information
- Occupation: Landowner and gentleman
- Children: Isabella Knightley; Emma Woodhouse
- Relatives: Henry Knightley (grandson); John Knightley (grandson); Bella Knightley (granddaughter); Emma Knightley (granddaughter); Henry Knightley (grandson)
- Home: Hartfield

Mr Henry Woodhouse is a central character in Jane Austen's 1815 novel Emma and the father of the protagonist, Emma Woodhouse. He is a wealthy member of the English landed gentry who owns a small country estate and substantial other property.

A valetudinarian widower, keen on gruel and a quiet life, he regrets the earlier marriage of Emma's elder sister, and is opposed to marriages in general.

== Character ==
With his cosy domesticity, his childlike simplicity, and kindly hospitality, Mr Woodhouse has been seen as a charming figure by generations of readers – as one of the most enchanting of chumps. A minority of critics, however, have taken a rather harsher view. Ronald Blythe, for example, insists that "Mr Woodhouse, so wrongly and oddly regarded as an old pet by generations of readers, is actually a menace", threatening Emma's future happiness by tying her to him and opposing all changes, especially marital. To Barbara Hardy, this complaint was an anachronistic view of an affectionate and unpredatory figure. Still, his role in the courtship plot is certainly that of what Northrop Frye called a "blocking character", even if one acting through weakness not strength – the tyranny of invalidism.

Jane Austen's authorial comments on Mr Woodhouse are very muted: for the most part he is presented in dialogue, where his eccentricities have the best chance to shine. He is introduced by her as "a nervous man, easily depressed... hating change of any kind", while a late vignette shows him under the weather, when "he could only be kept tolerably comfortable by almost ceaseless attention on his daughter's side". In between, Austen quietly observes his "gentle selfishness" and his "mild inexorability'. Those who see him as a confirmed egotist who uses his wealth to make the world revolve around himself – "unfit for any acquaintance, but such as would visit him on his own terms"; and hypocritically imperious with his servants – can certainly find evidence in the text to support their views; but the overall impression of a lovable charmer still remains.

It is with regard to his younger daughter, Emma, that the contrasting views of Mr Woodhouse come into starkest opposition. There is no doubt that he idealizes her: as she tells her friend Harriet, one of her reasons for not wanting to get married is that "never, never could I expect to be so truly beloved and important; so always first and always right in any man's eyes as I am in my father's" Mr Woodhouse's supporters see an almost unconditional love as standing behind his inability to see faults in Emma. To his critics, he has created a spider-web of flattery, a narcissistic cocoon that denies the reality of generational change and loss, within which Emma is psychologically trapped. In this reading, only the eventful twists and turns of the book's entire plot can breach her imaginary superiority and free her from him, enabling her to realise that "she had been entirely under a delusion...with unpardonable arrogance", and permitting a more realistic relationship to emerge in the form of Mr Knightley.
