= Jane Austen in popular culture =

Adaptations of Austen's novels

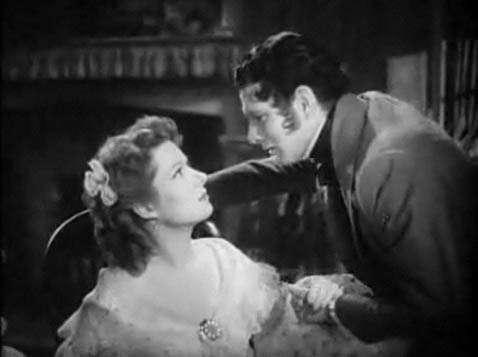
Greer Garson and Laurence Olivier in a 1940 adaptation of Pride and Prejudice

The author Jane Austen and her novels have been represented in popular culture in a wide variety of forms for nearly two centuries. Adaptations and re-interpretations of her work span literature, illustration, theatre, film, television, digital media, and fan culture, making Austen one of the most continually reimagined authors in the English-speaking world.

Jane Austen (16 December 1775 – 18 July 1817) was an English novelist whose nuanced social observation, ironic narrative voice, and pioneering use of free indirect speech have secured her position among the most influential writers in the history of English literature. Her six major novels—Sense and Sensibility, Pride and Prejudice, Mansfield Park, Emma, Northanger Abbey, and Persuasion—have inspired a long tradition of artistic interpretation.

Austen entered popular culture early in the nineteenth century. The first illustrated editions of her novels appeared in 1833, introducing her characters to a broader visual audience. Stage dramatizations followed in the late Victorian period, beginning in 1895, when Austen’s novels were adapted for theatrical performance with increasing frequency. The early twentieth century saw her work enter still newer media: professional theatre adaptations appeared from 1901 onward, while the first television version of a Jane Austen story was broadcast in 1938 by the BBC.

Film adaptations emerged soon after, most notably the 1940 Hollywood production of Pride and Prejudice, which helped introduce Austen to international cinema audiences. Subsequent decades brought a steady increase in film and television versions, ranging from faithful period dramas to modernised retellings. These adaptations differ widely in tone and style, reflecting changing cultural tastes and new interpretations of Austen’s themes.

By the 1980s, Austen’s reputation underwent a significant critical reassessment. While she had often been viewed primarily as a writer concerned with manners, marriage, and morality, scholars increasingly recognised her as a perceptive critic of class, gender, and social hierarchy in the late eighteenth and early nineteenth centuries. This shift in scholarly understanding helped fuel a renewed wave of adaptations at the end of the twentieth century.

Modern retellings expanded Austen’s presence in film and television beyond traditional period pieces. One of the most notable examples is Clueless (1995), Amy Heckerling’s contemporary adaptation of Emma, set in modern-day Beverly Hills. The film became a cultural phenomenon, leading to the creation of the television series and establishing a template for later modernisations.

In the twenty-first century, Austen’s influence extends beyond mainstream media into global fan culture, including cosplay, festivals, online communities, and literary tourism. Her novels continue to inspire new adaptations, reinterpretations, and scholarly discussions, demonstrating the enduring appeal of her characters, themes, and storytelling techniques more than 200 years after her death.

== Issues in film adaptations ==
=== Character narration ===
In 2005 Robert Irvine, a British scholar, wrote that the works of Austen remained a popular source for film makers, who eschewed Austen's narrator, rendering a true adaptation impossible. Austen's use of free indirect discourse, where the thoughts of the characters were summarized by the narrator, was generally not followed in the films. It is for this reason that many Austen scholars dislike Ang Lee's 1995 adaptation of Sense and Sensibility because the absence of a narrator 'glorifies the romantic conventions that Austen deflates'. Likewise, for this reason, many Austen scholars approve of Clueless, an adaptation of Emma set in a high school in Beverly Hills circa 1995, as the character of Cher Horowitz (the film's version of Emma Woodhouse) narrates several scenes. This is seen as the closest approximation of Austen's style in cinema yet done.

Irvine commented that because cinema and literature are different media, the best way of resolving this problem is for filmmakers to concentrate on the visuality of film, as cinema can depict what the books can only ask the reader to imagine.

=== Imaging of repression and freedom ===
A recurring image in Austen films is that of women gazing through a window to the outside world, or walking in the countryside. The critic Julianne Pidduck in her essay "Of Windows and Country Walks" argues the former image symbolizes repression and a woman's lot in Regency England, being trapped in a patriarchal society, while the latter image symbolises freedom. The critic Mary Favret, in her 2000 essay "Being True to Jane Austen," argued that because film is a moving image, it resists the tendency of photography to have a fixed image, suggesting a world where change is always possible. Because of this, Favret praised Roger Mitchell's 1995 adaptation of Persuasion as the film used a wandering camera to capture in a kaleidoscopic way Anne Elliot's unexpressed romantic-sexual feelings even when Anne (Amanda Root) remained still and silent.

=== Physicality ===
Irvine noted that film adaptations of Austen's work often used the physicality of the actors to show the sexual desires of the characters that Austen herself only hinted at, with Irving calling a "particularly notorious" example of this being the scene from Andrew Davies' 1995 adaptation of Pride and Prejudice, where Mr. Darcy (Colin Firth) dives into a pond and emerges with wet clothes clinging to his body before a clearly interested Miss Bennet (Jennifer Ehle).

The emphasis on the physicality of the actors to express emotions together with abandonment of the narrator has divided critics. Rebecca Dickson has complained that "strong and self-sufficient Elinor" of Sense and Sensibility became "a girl woman with unexpressed emotions who must learn to demonstrate them" in the Ang Lee film. By contrast, Penny Gay praised the Lee's Sense and Sensibility for portraying "the characters' experiences as bodies'" as offering up a filmic version of the experiences of women. Irvine argued that the emphasis on physicality of the actors is necessary once the voice of the narrator is eliminated as films used movements, looks and gestures to express emotions, requiring "...that all characters become physically and transparently expressive in a way that only problem cases such as Marianne Dashwood indulge in the novels". Cheryl Nixon defended Mr. Darcy's precipitous plunge into the pond as necessary to show the viewer that he was capable of depths of emotional and physical passion that the novel only implied to help explain why Miss Bennet falls in love with him.

=== Gender and feminism ===
Another issue concerning adaptations of Austen is that of gender, especially the portrayal of women. Some critics, such as Devoney Looser, have argued that by portraying strong women who are intelligent and socially adept and by emphasising the theme of sisterhood both literally between sisters and metaphorically between female friends, the Austen films become feminist films. Other critics such as Kristen Samuelian and Shannon Wooden have argued that Austen films are "post-feminist" films where women first encounter patriarchy before going on to live happier ever after with the men of their dreams in the patriarchal society of Regency England. Wooden also argued the Douglas McGrath's 1996 adaptation of Emma, Clueless, Sense and Sensibility and Persuasion all use the food imagery of the Austen books, where a fasting is a form of female protest, but in contrast to the books "...juxtapose food with representations or discussions of physical beauty, making a very late twentieth-century connection between not eating and feminine social and sexual success". Other critics like Martine Vioret have noted Austen films tended "to cater to female desires and to the female gaze" by their focus on the bodies of actors, dressed in close-fitting breeches in a way that fetishises the male body at a time when the male body was still the "locus of the beautiful". It is often noted that Austen films tended to portray the male body in a way that is normally associated with the filmic depiction of the female body as a source of pleasure to the male viewer. Irvine described the Austen films as a fantasy for women, with, for example, the character of Mr. Darcy displaying an "absolute and unconditioned male need for a woman".

=== British identity and politics ===
Another issue around the Austen films is their relation to the question of English and British national identity. In Britain, the Austen films are seen as a part of the "heritage industry"-an overlapping collection of government ministries, pressure groups and charities that seeks to preserve the "national heritage" by protecting landscapes and old buildings. Irvine observed that the buildings selected for preservation tended to be estates, castles and manor houses associated with the elite, which sends the message that the story of Britain is the story of its elites. The Austen films which are focused on the visual splendor of Regency England are seen as "heritage films" that are an extension of the "heritage industry". Prior to 1995, television adaptations of Austen's works tended to be produced cheaply, but the 1995 version of Pride and Prejudice was an expensive production that was filmed on location in the English countryside with Lyme Park playing Pemberly that was a great ratings success, settling the benchmark for subsequent productions. Afterwards, it became more common for Austen films to be visually sumptuous, expensive productions while the National Trust billed Lyme Park as the centrepiece of the "Pemberley Trail" for Janeites to go on a pilgrimage. Because the Austen adaptations are seen as celebrating a certain ideal of an "eternal England", there is a tendency to see both the film and television productions as implicitly conservative productions glorifying the ordered society of Regency England.

However, Irvine has cautioned against seeing all of the Austen films as carrying a conservative message Citing the Marxist historian Raphael Samuel, Irvine argued that Britain's heritage belongs to everyone and the memory of the past is used by disadvantaged groups just as much by advantaged groups to construct an "usable" version of British history. For instance, many of the Austen films are seen as offering a feminist critique of patriarchy in the Regency period. The leftist historian Edward Neill praised the Diarmuid Lawrence's 1996 television adaptation of Emma as superior to McGrath's theatrical adaptation, released that same year. Neill pointed out that McGrath's Emma lacks servants, while there many servants in the background of Lawrence's version, many of them performing absurd tasks. Likewise, Neill noted that the poor are nowhere to be seen in McGrath's Emma, while MacGrath's film frequently shows poor people in the background. Another critic, Roger Sales, noted that "frequent women in windows imaginary" suggested that the country estates of the gentry and aristocracy were in fact "genteel prisons" for women, which Irvine argued was inconsistent with the claim that the Austen films were a conservative fantasy of a lost idyll of an ordered society. The 1999 film adaptation of Mansfield Park by the Canadian director Patricia Rozema gave Fanny Price (Frances O'Connor) dialogue from some of Austen's especially acerbic letters, which attacked Sir Thomas Bertram as a "tyrant" for owning slaves on his estate in Antigua and added in a quasi-lesbian scene not in the book where Mary Crawford waxes eloquent to Price about how only women can really understand the pleasures that their bodies can produce, which seems to be Crawford's way of trying to seduce Price. Irvine praised Rozema's version of Mansfield Park as offering a critical picture of power imbalances and economic inequality in Regency society.

=== Commercialisation and sexuality ===
Austen has become a form of "cultural capital" for one to assert one's social superiority. In this regard, Austen has become a "brand", which is especially potent as the "Austen brand" has both high cultural connotations and mass appeal. Irvine commented that as painful as this may be to English professors like himself, at least part of the mass appeal of the Austen films today is due to a "perceived continuity" between Austen's novels and the modern "bodice rippers" and historical romance novels, especially Regency romance novels. A recurring complaint made by critics concerns the "harlequinization" of Austen in film, which is seen as the cheapening and oversimplification of Austen for a mass audience. However, Irvine noted that in Austen's own lifetime, her work was popular, but seen as low culture, being lumped in at British libraries together with "popular fiction" books that were the ancestors of the Harlequin romances. The perception of Austen as a high culture writer only started later, and certainly the appeal of the Austen films to many today seems to be that they are seen as a high culture version of Harlequin romances. Andrew Davies, who has produced several Austen films, has confessed as much to the charge of "harlequinization", saying he liked "a bit of bodice-ripping" when he adapting Austen's novels into films. The American critic Dianne F. Sadoff wrote disapprovingly of Davies's efforts to add in the scenes that he asserts that "Austen couldn't write" but claims that she wanted to write. Sadoff took issue with Jon Jones' 2007 adaptation of Northanger Abbey in which Davies added scenes of Catherine Moreland imagining being kidnapped and subjected to semi-consensual sado-masochistic sex, and the 2008 version of Sense and Sensibility which begins with a seduction scene mentioned as only happening a long time ago in the novel.

Diane Sadoff noted that Austen films are popular with a wide female audience that ranges in age from teenage girls to middle-aged women, instead of appealing to a narrow demographic. Sadoff wrote the most recent adaptations of Austen were done in a way that was calculated to appeal to young women. Sadoff used as examples Joe Wright's 2005 adaptation of Pride and Prejudice starring Keira Knightley, which brought "swashbuckler girlfriend sex appeal and postfeminist agency" to Austen, and Becoming Jane starring Anne Hathaway, which presented Austen as a modern career woman who just happened to be living in Georgian England. Sadoff wrote that both films have heroines with "...bared chests and swelling cleavage above Regency gown decolletage", perfectly "coiled hair" and looks of "wide-eyed intensity" that were meant both to arouse teenage boys and excite envy in teenage girls.

=== Appeal in the United States ===
The most lucrative market for these films today is the United States, not the United Kingdom. On 3 August 2007, the debut of Becoming Jane earned almost $1 million US in its first weekend, low compared to Superbad which took $31 million US in its opening weekend the following week, but a highly respectable showing for a heritage film set in Regency England and starring a mostly British cast unfamiliar to American audiences. Becoming Jane ran for ten weeks in the United States and ultimately took in a profit of $19 million US. Sadoff wrote that Hollywood likes Austen film adaptations because they appeal to Austen's existing fanbase.

Part of the appeal of Austen films in the United States is that they deal directly with the subject of class, which American filmmakers generally prefer to avoid. Americans like to see their nation as a meritocracy, and the suggestion that some Americans might be disadvantaged because of their race, sex and/or income level is a painful one, implying their nation is not living up to its ideals. American filmmakers often avoid confronting the subject of class especially; by contrast the Austen films set in Regency England are distant enough both in time and in geography to raise the subject of class without imposing discomfort on an American audience. Likewise, in Georgian Britain, the only roles possible for a woman in polite society were those of a wife and mother, which means that Austen films can deal starkly with sexism in ways that films set in contemporary times often do not. Irvine noted in Clueless, the characters are only concerned with being "cool", as there is almost no suggestion in the film of any class, racial and sexual barriers in southern California, circa 1995, as the only social line that matters is the one between "cool" and "uncool". Only with the minor character of the put-upon El Salvadoran maid who works for the Horowitz family, whom Cher keeps calling a "Mexican", does Clueless imply that there might be some inequality in modern America. However, Irvine noted that American audiences cannot entirely embrace the social hierarchy of Georgian England, based as it was on land and birth, and instead the 1996 version of Emma offered a hierarchy based on consumption and material, much like the modern United States.

One of the few American Austen films to confront class directly in a modern settling was the 1990 film Metropolitan by the American director Whit Stillman, a loose adaptation of Mansfield Park set in New York City in the late 1980s. The "old money" characters consider Austen part of their "cultural capital" that sets them apart from vulgar "new money," with one character quoting Lionel Trilling's remark that "not to like Jane Austen is to put oneself under suspicion...of a want of breeding".

Irvine argued that Austen offers a particular appeal to American conservatives in that the sort of ordered society that they used to openly admire and were nostalgic for, namely that of the antebellum Southern, the economy of which was based on slavery. Irvine noted that Robert Zigler Leonard's 1940 adaptation of Pride and Prejudice moved the story from the Regency period to the Victorian era to make it seem similar to Gone With The Wind, and the film was marketed as an epic 19th-century love story akin to Gone With The Wind. According to Irvine, the "social idyll of a lost pre-industrial England that Austen often represents for [American] conservatives is here aligned with a similar idyll imagined in the pre-Civil War Southern states". Irvine however cautioned that one "should not be too quick to attribute the success of the Austen adaptations in the US to an implicitly racist Anglophilia", arguing that the success of Austen in the United States was due to the way she could be presented as offering "cultural capital" to those who were and are willing to take the time to read her novels, and to a nostalgia for the perceived better and simpler times of Regency England.

== Austen in Asia ==
=== India, Pakistan, and Bangladesh ===
The global appeal of Austen today can be seen in that Bollywood regularly produces versions of Austen's books reset in modern India and adjusted to the style of Indian films, which forbid kissing and often include several musical numbers. Austen's books often feature match-making parents, which gives her stories a particular resonance in India, where the majority of marriages are arranged. The British colony of India, which was ruled by the East India Company until 1858, and as a Crown colony from 1858 to 1947, came to include all of modern India, Pakistan, and Bangladesh. English as an academic discipline began in 19th century India as British officials of the Raj set out to teach English to their Indian subjects, and as a result, many middle-class Indians, Pakistanis and Bangladeshis are familiar with Austen's books. The love marriages featured in Austen's stories are popular with women from middle-class Indian families, the vast majority of whom are in or are destined for arranged marriages set up by their parents to men that they generally don't know. In India, Sense and Sensibility was adapted into the 2000 Tamil language film Kandukondain Kandukondain and the 2014 Hindi language soap opera Kumkum Bhagya; Emma has been adapted as the 2010 film Aisha; and Pride and Prejudice into the 2004 film Bride and Prejudice.

The largest market for Austen's books are in India and Pakistan, where the themes of "marrying off" young women to rid families of the burdens of supporting them, the importance of the family as a social unit, dowries as a factor in marriage negotiations and inheritance laws that favor males all address issues that are relevant in both India and Pakistan.

Both India and Pakistan have large Austen societies with the Pakistani Austen Society hosting events for "Jovial Janeites" that feature "Austentatious tea parties" and "chai and chatter". Laaleen Sukhera, the founder of the Jane Austen Society of Pakistan, told The Economist that Austen is relevant in the Indian subcontinent because society in South Asia is full of "disapproving Lady Catherine de Bourgh-esque society aunties, rakish Wickhams and Willoughbys, pretentious Mrs Eltons and holier-than thou Mr Collins types". Bloomsbury published Austenistan, a collection of stories inspired by the works of Austen and set in contemporary Pakistan, in 2018.

=== Japan ===
Austen was unknown in Japan until the Meiji Restoration of 1867 opened Japan up to Western influence, and even then Austen was largely ignored. Japanese translators preferred adventure stories from the West, which were more similar to samurai stories, the most popular novels in Meiji Japan. The Greek/Irish scholar Lafcadio Hearn, who became the first Western scholar to teach in Japan, warned his Japanese students in his lectures that they would not like Austen, as the sort of violence which was normal in samurai stories was completely absent in Austen's novels.

The first Japanese critic to draw attention to Austen was the influential writer Natsume Sōseki who in his 1907 book A Theory of Literature wrote that: "Anyone who is unable to appreciate Austen will be unable to understand the beauty of realism." Sōseki, who was fluent in English, lived in London from 1900 to 1903, where he first discovered Austen, who he regarded as having achieved his ideal of sokuten kyoshi (literally "follow Heaven, forsake the self"-a writer should follow his/her instincts and write stories that have no traces of their own personality in them). At the time of his death in 1916, Sōseki was writing a novel Meian (Light and Darkness), which reset Pride and Prejudice in Taishō era Japan. Unlike Pride and Prejudice, the couple Tsuda and O-Nobu are already married at the beginning of the novel, and Sōseki traced how pride and prejudice was pushing their marriage apart rather than be an obstacle to be overcome as Mr. Darcy courted Elizabeth Bennet in Austen's story. Sōseki followed Austen in using everyday life and apparently banal conversations to trace how the mutual pride of Tsuda and O-Nobu push them apart despite the fact that they both love each other.

Austen was first translated into Japanese in 1926 when Nogami Toyoichirō and his wife Nogami Yaeko translated Pride and Prejudice. Nogami Yaeko's 1928 novel Machiko, set in Taishō era Japan, is inspired by Pride and Prejudice. Unlike Pride and Prejudice where the war with France only exists in the background, Machiko deals directly with turmoil of Taishō era Japan where strikes were frequent, much of the younger intelligentsia were questioning the kokutai and admired the Russian Revolution, and the police waged a vigorous campaign against those accused of "thought crimes". In 1925, the Imperial Diet passed the Peace Preservation Law, which made the very act of thinking about "altering the kokutai" a crime; the specific thoughts that were made illegal were republicanism, pacifism, and advocating the end of private property. Those found by the police to be thinking these forbidden thoughts served lengthy prison sentences and were subjected to Tenkō ("changing direction"), a process of brain-washing where left-wing activists were brain-washed to worship the Emperor as a living god. In Machiko, which was published at a time when censorship was much less stricter in Japan is set in the midst of these struggles as Machiko and her fellow activists are constantly having to avoid the police. At same time, Nogami attacked the double standard of male radicals who preached justice for the masses, but refused to treat women as equals, seeing the duty of female radicals just to be their obliging bedmates, and nothing more. In Pride and Prejudice, Wickham marries Lydia Bennet, which makes him part of the family so Elizabeth Bennet has to be civil to him, while in Machiko, Machiko repudiates Seki outright, saying his dishonesty and his contempt for women makes him unworthy of her.

Austen went out of favour in Japan during the militarist period in the early Showa era (1931–1945) when a xenophobic, ultra-nationalist mood prevailed, and the government discouraged people from reading foreign books. But during the period of the American occupation (1945–52), almost every Austen book was translated into Japanese except Mansfield Park (which was not translated until 1978), and Austen started to be widely taught in Japanese high schools. The translation of Sense and Sensibility in 1947, followed by a translation of Pride and Prejudice in 1950 were published by the prestigious publishing house Iwanami Shoten, and both books sold very well. The success of the Iwanami versions of Sense and Sensibility and Pride and Prejudice was the moment that Austen became respectable in Japan. In 1963, the critic Yamamoto Kenkichi, in his essay "The Smile of Pride and Prejudice" that proved to be influential, criticized Japanese literature for being overtly solemn and praised Austen for her "natural ease", which led him to conclude: "Collins, Wickham, Mrs. Bennet, Lady Catherine, how she turns her laughter on these minor characters. They are observed with some malice, certainly, but in a pleasant, mischievous, irreverent manner which ultimately accords salvation to even these fools". Austen has been regarded as a major writer in Japan since the 1950s, and in 2007, the Jane Austen Society of Japan was founded to provide a space for Japanese Janeites. In 2015–2016, manga versions of Pride and Prejudice, Emma, and Sense and Sensibility were published in Japan.

A Japanese writer very much influenced by Austen was Yumiko Kurahashi. In her 1971 novel Yume no ukihashi (The Bridge of Dreams), the heroine Keiko is a graduate student working on a thesis concerning Austen's books, an interest that paralleled the author's as Yume no ukihashi is in many ways a resetting of an Austen novel in modern Japan. However, the climax of the novel where Keiko learns that parents of her boyfriend Kōichi and her parents have been engaged in a four-sided sexual relationship for many years, and Kōichi might very well be her brother, is unlike of the denouements of any of Austen's books. The Japanese scholar Ebine Hiroshi described Yume no ukihashi as a fusion between an Austen novel and the fascination with breaking sexual taboos like incest which often characterizes Japanese literature. Even after learning that Kōichi is quite possibly her brother, Keiko cannot give him up as their souls have crossed the "bridge of dreams" to "the other side of the world" where they have been fused together, which leads her despite being married to another man to engage a ménage à quatre with Kōichi and his wife; the novel ends with Keiko meeting Kōichi in Kyoto while her husband calls her to say he is spending the night with Kōichi's wife. Hiroshi wrote in Yume no ukihashi Kurahashi created a heroine, Keiko, who is a many ways an Austen heroine with her quiet nature and calm dignity that hides a passionate, romantic side while at the same time the book was concerned with the mystical "other side", a supernatural world of power, mystery and dread that can only be glimpsed which co-exists alongside our world, a uniquely Japanese concern that would have been alien to Austen.

=== Turkey ===
In Turkey Austen was first introduced at the so-called "foreign schools" for foreigners domiciled in the Ottoman Empire, in which Turks were also allowed to enroll in the late 19th century. Initially, Turks only read Austen in the English original, and the first novel to be translated into Turkish was Sense and Sensibility as Sağduyu ve Duyarlık in two volumes in 1946 and 1948. Austen first came to widespread notice in Turkey in the late 1960s when Nihal Yeğinobalı started translating Austen with her first translation being Pride and Prejudice as Aşk ve Gurur (Love and Pride). Yeğinobalı's translations of Austen removed much of the irony in the original, replaced the free indirect discourse with speeches by the characters and made changes to the plot and characters to make Austen fit into the style of popular Turkish romances. Yeğinobalı's translations are the ones by which Austen is best known in Turkey. The Turkish scholar Rana Tekcan wrote that Yeğinobalı was not particularly faithful to Austen, but it is very difficult to translate English novels into Turkish as in the Turkish language the predicate always comes at the end of a sentence, which is not the case in English. It was not 2006 that Austen was first translated properly into Turkish when Pride and Prejudice was translated as Gurur ve Önyargı by Hamdi Koç, who at present is engaged in translating the rest of Austen's novels into Turkish. Gurur ve Önyargı sold out in its first year, and a second edition was issued in 2007, which Tekcan used to argue that many Turks wanted a proper version of Austen in their own language. Austen's status in modern Turkey can be seen in the Wikipedia-like website Ekşi Sözlük (The Sourtimes Dictionary), when anonymous contributors write articles on various subjects; typing Jane Austen on the Ekşisözlük produces comments such as "Jane Austen is for those who are ashamed to read romance novels"and "The characters that Jane Austen created still live in the likes of a neighbor who is dying to get her daughters married to rich men.".

=== Korea ===
Such is the appeal of Austen in Asia that during the period when Korea was a Japanese colony (1905–1945) Austen was first translated into Korean as the Japanese colonial administration- which always justified itself on the grounds that Korea was hopelessly backward and in need of Japanese rule to progress- sought to use Austen's books as an example of the sort of cultural progress the country was experiencing under Japanese rule. In Asia during this period, books by Western authors were always seen as embodying modernity and progress, and thus Austen in colonial-era Korea was presented as a symbol of modernity, at least during the so-called "Cultural Rule" period (1920–37) when Japanese rule was more moderate as compared to prior and succeeding periods. The South Korean writer Park Wansuh wrote two novels influenced by Pride and Prejudice, A Faltering Afternoon (1977) and Pride and Fantasy (1980) both set in Yusin era South Korea. In A Faltering Afternoon, three sisters from a lower-middle-class background who resemble Elizabeth, Jane and Lydia Bennet respectively find that their only hope of social-economic success comes with marrying the right men. Unlike Pride and Prejudice, two of the Ho sisters' relationships end unhappily and only Ho Malhi, the sister who resembles Elizabeth Bennet, ends up well with her choice of a man. Hŏ Sŏng, the once successful small businessman who was now struggling as the chaebol came to dominate the South Korean economy in the 1970s, resembled Mr. Bennet as he watches his daughters' "quest" to find the ideal husband, through unlike him, Hŏ ends up committing suicide on the day of his daughter's wedding. In Pride and Fantasy, Park took on one of the most painful subjects in South Korea at the time, namely the fact that the Chinilpa elite who had served Japan in the colonial period was the same elite that ruled South Korea in the 1970s. General Park Chung-hee, the military dictator of South Korea from 1961 until his assassination in 1979, had started his career as an officer in the Manchukuo Army and served with the Kwantung Army in its campaigns to "pacify" Manchukuo. During Park's rule, he applied the same methods he learned in Japanese service to his own people, and in the 1960s-70s, South Korea was one of the world's worst human rights abusers. Pride and Fantasy concerns the relationship between two men, one of whom is a male version of Elizabeth Bennet, and the other whom resembles Mr. Darcy. The Bennet-like Namsang came from a family that resisted Japanese rule and were ruined as a result while the Darcy-like Hyŏn comes from a chinilpa family that became fabulously rich by collaborating with the Japanese.

The character of Elizabeth Bennet with her stubborn individualism and nonconformity with social norms was popular in South Korea during the stifling rule of General Park, at least in part as a reaction to his attempts to crush individualism and promote conformity. However, the South Korean scholar Park You-me noted that for a certain generation of Korean Janeites like her mother, who lived through the years 1937–45, when the Japanese state tried to stamp out the Korean language and culture, mobilized society for total war, and forced thousands of Korean young women into the "comfort women corps", turning women's bodies literally into commodities to be exploited, leading to a situation where :"My mother's suspicion of Austen's moral authority is representative of Korean female readers' reception of Austen's novels following the Japanese occupation of Korea and the Korean War". Park wrote that as much as her mother loved Austen that she always regarded Austen's novels as fantasy works, depicting a world that had never existed and could never exist ever, as it was the fate of women to be exploited and abused. In 2014, the highest rated TV series in South Korea was Omangwa Pyungyeon ("Lawless World"), a resettling of Pride and Prejudice in modern South Korea in a prosecutor's office. Omangwa Pyungyeon which aired between October 2014-January 2015 concerned a relationship between a passionate novice prosecutor and her more experienced and snooty colleague. Beyond the specific adaptations, many critics have noted that the heroes of Korean soap operas owe much to Mr. Darcy.

=== Iran ===
The Iranian writer Azar Nafisi recalled teaching Austen secretly in Iran in the 1990s (in the Islamic Republic of Iran Austen is banned as a "degenerate" Western writer) to a group of teenage girls who loved Austen's stories which feature women who fall in love with men who are worthy of their affections, which was so different from their own lives. Nafisi noted in the Islamic Republic of Iran where wife-beating is legal, "love is forbidden, banished from the public sphere" and sex is "violently suppressed", her students fell in love with an author whose books feature female "rebels" who defiantly say "no" to "silly mothers", "incompetent fathers" and a "rigidly orthodox society", and moreover get away with it. An American academic who went on Radio Times web broadcast to talk about Austen recalled being besieged with callers of an Asian background. One Iranian woman, living in the United States, called in to say she had first read Austen after her teenage daughter brought home Sense and Sensibility, which made her cry as she had experienced nothing like this in her own culture, where dating is forbidden and marriages are arranged. Another caller was a Chinese woman whose first Austen book was Pride and Prejudice, which she read in translation after the ban in China on Austen had been lifted after the end of the Cultural Revolution, saying she nothing read anything so moving and romantic before. The Chinese woman added after seeing all of the violence and horror of the Cultural Revolution when the streets of China were soaked with human blood, so many lives were ruined, and so many had behaved so badly that reading Pride and Prejudice she gave her hope in humanity again.

=== China ===
The novels of Jane Austen were unknown in China until 1917 when Wei Yi mentioned Austen in her book Brief Profiles of Famous Western Novelists where she was described as "one of the celebrated English novelists". Only a few western novels were translated in China during the 19th century, and it was not until 1898 when Lin Shu translated Camille by Alexandre Dumas, which unexpectedly become a bestseller, that Chinese publishers became interested in western books. Austen was first translated into Chinese in 1935, when two editions of Pride and Prejudice were published in Beijing and Shanghai. After 1949 Austen was out of favor in the People's Republic of China as a "bourgeois" author whose work was considered frivolous. In the 1950s most of the foreign books published in the People's Republic were translations of Soviet books, and Western authors were only translated into Chinese if they were "revolutionary" writers like Lord Byron or if their books portrayed Western societies in an unflattering light like Charles Dickens; Austen did not serve either purpose very well. In 1956, Austen was first translated in the People's Republic when Pride and Prejudice was published in Beijing, with an introduction by the translator explaining how the translation was justified on Marxist grounds as the novel showed the decline of feudalism and rise of capitalism in England. In 1965 Dong Hengxun, an academic, condemned Austen in an article titled "The Description of Love in Pride and Prejudice" in the Guangming Daily as "artistically insignificant". Austen was banned along with other Western authors in China during the Cultural Revolution and during the 1980s, translations of Austen were grudgingly allowed, though officially Austen remained out of favor. The first Chinese academic in the People's Republic to write favorably of Austen was Zhu Hong, who complained in his 1986 essay "The Pride and Prejudice against Jane Austen" that ordinary people liked Austen well enough, but academics had to condemn her because of the Party line, which led him to ask for books to be judged on artistic grounds only. In the 1990s Communist Party condemnations of Austen ceased, and a number of Chinese students produced dissertations on Austen, with Austen being very popular with female students. In 2011 one Chinese academic, Zhang Helong, wrote about Austen's "huge popularity" in modern China. In 2017, The Economist noted that in China: "... Austen is seen as having a particular affinity with Chinese culture, where "manners matter" as they did in Georgian England." Pride and Prejudice has been translated into Chinese at least 50 times while Sense and Sensibility has been translated 10 times in the last decades. Austen's ideal hero as a property-owning gentleman has resonance in China, where a well-off man with good education and manners who owes land is the considered the ideal man. In 2010, Sadoff wrote that the growing appeal of Austen in Asia ensures that market for Austen films continues to grow, and it is possible Asia would soon replace the United States as the largest market for Austen films, if it has not already done so.

== Austen in the Americas ==
=== United States ===
In the United States, Austen was described in 2013 as the object of "wildly devotional fan-worship" with conventions, parties and fan fiction. One American Janeite, Myretta Robens, was quoted to a BBC reporter as saying: "There's a longing for the elegance of the time. It's an escape." When asked why so many American Janeites write fan fiction, Robens stated: "Quite frankly, I think a lot of people want more sex, particularly with Elizabeth and Darcy." Another American Janeite, Laurel Ann Nattress explained the appeal of Austen fan fiction in the U.S. as: "People just love her characters and they don't want to give them up." Nattress argued that the popularity of Austen in America was due mostly to a strong Anglophile streak in America, saying: "I think that we look back to the motherland in many respects. Look at the incredible impact Downton Abbey has had over here. It's a perfect example of how America is fascinated by British culture." Robens explained to a BBC reporter the mostly female readership of Austen in America; "It's women, in general, who fall in love with them. It's a truth universally acknowledged that women want to read about relationships."

Nicole M. Wright, an academic specialising in "the history of the novel", notes that many alt-right leaders invoke Austen to "def[y] the sexual revolution", offer "symbol[s] of sexual purity; standard-bearer[s] [for] a vanished white traditional culture; ...[prove] the rule of female inferiority.". Elaine Bander of the Jane Austen Society of North America expresses considerable annoyance about the appropriation of Austen by the alt-right, writing: "No one who reads Jane Austen's words with any attention and reflection can possibly be alt-right. All the Janeites I know are rational, compassionate, liberal-minded people." The American journalist Jennifer Schuessler reported this appropriation of Austen is very common, citing the remarks of a graduate student Tracey Hutchings-Goetz, who was surprised to see the Wikipedia article about Pride and Prejudice describe the novel as celebrating traditional marriage supported by citations to an on-line article from the conservative Catholic magazine Crisis, saying to Schuessler: "It was a version of the novel that didn't make any sense to us as scholars, supported by a completely unscholarly source".

=== Latin America ===
As documented in All Roads Lead to Austen, American author Amy Elizabeth Smith visited several Latin American countries in 2011 to see where Austen stood in that part of the world. Smith was at first concerned that the type of novels that Austen chose to write would not be popular in Guatemala, where most of the people are Maya Indians, being both Spanish-speakers and unfamiliar with her work. But she found Austen fitted in well with the Maya, intensely family-oriented people who criticized her for not taking her own family with her to Guatemala, saying how could she possibly leave her parents behind in America. Smith discovered that Austen's picture of close-knit families in the English countryside was to the Maya comparable to their own existence in the Guatemalan countryside. When Smith asked her Guatemalan students if the story of Pride and Prejudice could take place in modern Guatemala, the unanimous answer was yes. Smith found her Guatemalan students related to Pride and Prejudice better than her American students as the general expectation in Guatemala is that a woman should be married by her early twenties, just as was the case in Regency England, whereas her American students have trouble understanding why Elizabeth Bennet was risking social disgrace by turning down two marriage proposals. Moreover, Smith's Guatemalan students found the subject of class prejudices in Regency England more compelling than her American students, with many also saying racial prejudices against the Maya by Guatemala's Criollo elite made them relate to Elizabeth Bennet's struggle for acceptance from the Hertfordshire elite. Smith reported class discussions in the United States about Pride and Prejudice did not automatically lead to the subject of racism, while in Guatemala her students always brought up the racism against the Maya when discussing Miss Bennet's struggle against the gentry and aristocracy of Hertfordshire. By contrast, in Paraguay, where the majority of the population are Guaraní Indians, Smith discovered that hardly anyone knew who Austen was, and much of her class was indifferent to the books. Smith suggested that the War of the Triple Alliance, which wiped out most of the Paraguayan population between 1864 and 1870 with the country going from one million to 200, 000 people, had left a grim, death-obsessed mentality in Paraguay where the macabre was celebrated and where Austen simply could not fit into.

In Mexico, where Smith asked a group of local women in Puerto Vallarta if the plot of Sense and Sensibility had any relevance in modern Mexico, she was told by one woman: "The book's really relevant...Things then, in her country, are just the same way here and now. Look at Willoughby, taking advantage of women. Men here do that all the time. And Marianne, marrying more for the sake of being married than for being in love. Women are here are afraid to be single. It is very hard". In Ecuador, Smith discovered that Ecuadoran men all detested the character of Mr. Darcy with one man telling her Darcy deserved "Es de matarlo a palos" ("to be beaten to death with a stick") while Ecuadoran women were much more fond of the character, saying he did not deserved such a fate their menfolk. The Ecuadorans tended to regard Austen as more of a fantasy writer, describing life in Regency England that was simply inconceivable in modern Ecuador, with one reader of Pride and Prejudice telling Smith that none of the characters from that book would last a day in Guayaquil.

== As a character ==
=== Film and television ===
In 2007, Anne Hathaway starred as Austen in Becoming Jane. Based on the biography Becoming Jane Austen by Jon Hunter Spence, the film focuses on Austen's early life, her development as an author, and the posited romantic relationship with Thomas Langlois Lefroy (James McAvoy).

Miss Austen Regrets, a television film starring Olivia Williams as Jane Austen, was released in the same year. Based on Austen's surviving letters, the semi-biographical television movie focused on the last few years of her life as she looked back on her life and loves and helped her favourite niece, Fanny Knight (Imogen Poots), find a husband.

The Real Jane Austen, a dramatised biography starring Gillian Kearney as Jane Austen, with John Standing and Phyllis Logan as her parents, was produced and directed for BBC One by Nicky Pattison in 2002.

In 2025, Miss Austen appeared on PBS as a four-part series with Patsy Ferran playing the role of Jane Austen.

=== Theatre ===
Dear Jane, written by Eleanor Holmes Hinkley and staged in 1922 at the National Theatre, Cambridge, Massachusetts by The 47 Club was a full-length dramatised biography in the form of "an idealization of Jane Austen's early life [as] a romantic comedy". The work was produced again at the Civic Repertory Theatre, New York, in 1932.

JANE, the musical debuted in June 2006 at the Artrix Theatre, Bromsgrove, England. The West-End style musical, directed by Geetika Lizardi, focuses on Austen as a modern heroine, a woman who chose art and integrity over the security of a loveless marriage.

=== Literature ===
The almost blank years in Austen's biography, 1801 to 1804, are the setting for Barbara Ker Wilson's Jane Austen in Australia (ISBN 0436577003), published as Antipodes Jane in the UK in 1985.

Jane Austen stars as an amateur sleuth in Stephanie Barron's series of historical mystery novels.

Kate Beaton, cartoonist of webcomic Hark! A Vagrant, devoted one of her comic strips to Jane Austen.

Jane Austen and her death were the subject of Kathleen A. Flynn's 2017 novel The Jane Austen Project and Lindsay Ashford's 2011 novel The Mysterious Death of Miss Jane Austen.

=== Radio ===
In 2014, BBC Radio 4 broadcast The Mysterious Death of Jane Austen, adapted from Ashford's novel by Elaine Horne and Andrew Davies, as part of their 15 Minute Drama series in five episodes, featuring Elaine Cassidy as Jane Austen. The story was a fictional interpretation of the few facts surrounding Jane Austen's early and mysterious death at age 41 in which Anne Sharp, former governess to the Austen family and Jane's close friend, tells the story of "family intrigues, shocking secrets, forbidden loves, and maybe even murder."

In the BBC Radio series Old Harry's Game, written by and starring Andy Hamilton, Jane Austen is depicted as an unhinged, ultraviolent denizen of Hell.

Jane Austen was portrayed by Felicity Montagu in a number of episodes of the BBC Radio 4 comedy series Old Harry's Game (1995–2012). However, her character as written by the series' creator/writer Andy Hamilton is a far cry from her popular image; she is extremely foul-mouthed and extremely violent – a reaction to having lived such a sedate and repressed lifestyle – and sports tattoos: a scorpion on each arm and the word "hate" on her forehead. Her punishment, as stated in the Series 4 episode "Poets Corner", is "to be surrounded by silly relatives and unreliable Army captains ... though the demons taking on the guises end up with a lot of bite marks." Her first appearance is in the Series Two episode "G.U.T." when she has a boxing match with Bette Davis. According to Satan, "within moments of her arrival [in Hell], she'd beaten up twelve demons, snorted cocaine with Machiavelli and rogered Oliver Cromwell and most of his army," then performed "unnatural sex with Catherine the Great"; according to Jane, "She wasn't that great." In the Series Six episode "Investigation", she leads an attempted escape from Hell with Hitler, Napoleon, Idi Amin, Pol Pot and Jean-Bédel Bokassa.

=== Video games ===
Jane Austen, voiced by Eden Riegel, is revealed as the narrator of 2013's Saints Row IV in a bonus cutscene, and the game's antagonist Zinyak reads the first chapter of Pride and Prejudice on an in-game radio station. Both the protagonist, who is the leader of the 3rd Street Saints, and the game alien antagonist Zinyak are depicted as fans of Austen's work. She also appears as a figure in How the Saints Save Christmas DLC and Saints Row IV standalone expansion, Saints Row: Gat out of Hell.

== Sense and Sensibility (1811) ==
=== Film and television ===
Year	Adaptation	Elinor Dashwood	Marianne Dashwood	Director	Screenwriter	Reference	Notes
1971	Sense and Sensibility; Television Miniseries	Joanna David	Ciaran Madden	David Giles	Denis Constanduros		
1981	Sense and Sensibility; Television Miniseries	Irene Richard	Tracey Childs	Rodney Bennett	Alexander Baron		
1995	Sense and Sensibility; Feature Film	Emma Thompson	Kate Winslet	Ang Lee	Emma Thompson		
2008	Sense and Sensibility; Television Miniseries	Hattie Morahan	Charity Wakefield	John Alexander	Andrew Davies		
2024	Sense and Sensibility; Hallmark Channel Original Movie	Deborah Ayorinde	Bethany Antonia	Roger M. Bobb	Tim Huddleston		
2026	Sense and Sensibility; Feature Film	Daisy Edgar-Jones	Esmé Creed-Miles	Georgia Oakley	Diana Reid		

==== Looser adaptations ====
- Kandukondain Kandukondain (2000) is an Indian Tamil-language film set in the present, based on the same plot, starring Tabu as Sowmya (Elinor Dashwood) and Aishwarya Rai as Meenakshi (Marianne Dashwood), with Ajit as Manohar (Edward Ferrars), Abbas as Srikanth (Willoughby), and Mammootty as Captain Bala (Colonel Brandon).
- Material Girls (2006) is a modern-day set film about two rich, spoiled Hollywood socialites's economical misfortune and struggles, whose plot was conceived from Jane Austen's Sense and Sensibility.
- From Prada to Nada (2011) is an adaptation set in the present among Mexican Americans in Los Angeles.
- Scents and Sensibility (2011) is also a modern-day adaptation. It follows the sisters as they struggle after their father is imprisoned for investment fraud.
- Kumkum Bhagya (2014) is an Indian television serial starring Sriti Jha and Shabbir Ahluwalia.

=== Professional theatre ===
- Kate Hamill's adaptation for the stage premiered in a short run at New York City's Bedlam theater Company in November 2014. It had a longer run in 2016 directed by Eric Tucker, also at Bedlam. Hamill played Marianne Dashwood.

=== Other references ===
- In Red Dwarf: Back to Earth, Lister tries to read Sense and Sensibility in tribute to Kochanski, although he is not sure how to pronounce the author's name, trying out "oosten" and "orsten", as well as desperately hoping for "car chases in this one."

== Pride and Prejudice (1813) ==
=== Film and television ===
Year	Adaptation	Elizabeth Bennet	Fitzwilliam Darcy	Director	Screenwriter	Reference	Notes
1938	Pride and Prejudice; Television movie	Curigwen Lewis	Andrew Osborn		Michael Barry		This TV program is believed to be lost; it was performed live before the camera, and never recorded.
1940	Pride and Prejudice; Feature film	Greer Garson	Laurence Olivier	Robert Z. Leonard	Aldous Huxley; Helen Jerome; Jane Murfin		
1949	Pride and Prejudice Television movie	Madge Evans	John Baragrey	Fred Coe	Samuel Taylor		Video was previously considered lost, but an archival taped copy exists.
1952	Pride and Prejudice; Television miniseries	Daphne Slater	Peter Cushing	Campbell Logan	Cedric Wallis		This TV series is believed to be lost; it was performed live before the camera, and never recorded. The first role of Prunella Scales.
1957	Orgoglio e pregiudizio Television miniseries	Virna Lisi	Franco Volpi	Daniele D'Anza	Edoardo Anton		An adaptation in Italian.
1958	Pride and Prejudice; Television miniseries	Jane Downs	Alan Badel		Cedric Wallis		This TV series is believed to be lost; no copies are known to exist.
1961	De vier dochters Bennet; Television miniseries	Lies Franken	Ramses Shaffy	Peter Holland	Cedric Wallis; Lo van Hensbergen		An adaptation in Dutch. It used the screenplay by Cedric Walles, which was also used for the 1952 and 1958 BBC adaptations.
1966	Orgullo y prejuicio Television miniseries	Elena María Tejeiro	Pedro Becco	Alberto González Vergel	José Méndez Herrera		An adaptation in Spanish. This TV series is believed to be lost; no copies are known to exist.
1967	Pride and Prejudice; Television miniseries	Celia Bannerman	Lewis Fiander	Joan Craft	Nemone Lethbridge		
1980	Pride and Prejudice; Television miniseries	Elizabeth Garvie	David Rintoul	Cyril Coke	Fay Weldon		
1995	Pride and Prejudice; Television miniseries	Jennifer Ehle	Colin Firth	Simon Langton	Andrew Davies		
2005	Pride & Prejudice; Feature film	Keira Knightley	Matthew Macfadyen	Joe Wright	Deborah Moggach		
2026	Pride and Prejudice; Television miniseries	Emma Corrin	Jack Lowden	Euros Lyn	Dolly Alderton		

==== Looser adaptations ====
- "Furst Impressions" (1995), an episode of the children's television series Wishbone, is based on Pride and Prejudice. Wishbone plays the role of Mr. Darcy.
- In the 1997 episode of science fiction comedy Red Dwarf entitled "Beyond a Joke", the crew of the space ship relax in a virtual reality rendition of "Pride and Prejudice Land" in "Jane Austen World".
- Bridget Jones's Diary (2001) borrowed its basic plot elements from Pride and Prejudice, and the character of Mark Darcy (played in the film by Colin Firth, who played Mr. Darcy in the 1995 television Pride and Prejudice) is named in deliberate homage to the original character.
- Pride & Prejudice: A Latter-Day Comedy (2003) is an independent film adaptation set among Mormons in Utah.
- Kahiin Toh Hoga (2003–2007) is an Indian romantic-drama soap opera which aired on Star Plus and starred Aamna Shariff, Rajeev Khandelwal and Gurpreet Singh.
- Bride & Prejudice (2004) transports most of the plot to present-day India.
- Lost in Austen (2008) is a four-part British fantasy television series in which Amanda Price (Jemima Rooper), a devoted Janeite, trades places with Elizabeth Bennet. Gemma Arterton and Elliot Cowan star as Elizabeth and Darcy.
- A 2008 Israeli television six-part miniseries set the story in Galilee with Mr Darcy a well-paid worker in the high-tech industry.
- The Lizzie Bennet Diaries (2012–2013) is an Emmy winning YouTube adaptation in which Lizzie Bennet (Ashley Clements), a graduate student, explains her life through the video blog format alongside her sisters Jane Bennet (Laura Spencer) and Lydia Bennet (Mary Kate Wiles) and her friend Charlotte Lu (Julia Cho).
- Austenland (2013), a modern-day reimagining of the story set in a country estate which has been repurposed as a Jane Austen themed romantic adventure travel destination. Keri Russell plays an American woman whose in-universe experience aligns with Elizabeth Bennet's, with Bret McKenzie and JJ Feild as the male leads.
- Death Comes to Pemberley (2013) is a 3-part murder mystery television drama based on the novel of the same name as a continuation of Pride and Prejudice with some flashbacks to events from the book. It stars Anna Maxwell Martin as Elizabeth Darcy, Matthew Rhys as Fitzwilliam Darcy, Jenna Coleman as Lydia Wickham, and Matthew Goode as George Wickham.
- Pride and Prejudice and Zombies (2016), a movie based on the novel of the same name with Lily James as Elizabeth Bennet, Sam Riley as Fitzwilliam Darcy, Bella Heathcote as Jane Bennet, Douglas Booth as Charles Bingley and Charles Dance as Mr Bennet.
- Before the Fall (2016) is an indie-adaptation and gender-bent reimagining of Pride and Prejudice with Elizabeth Bennett as a man, starring Ethan Sharrett as Ben Bennett and Chase Conner as Lee Darcy.
- Unleashing Mr. Darcy (2016) is a modern Hallmark film adaptation set in New York City with Ryan Paevey as Mr. Darcy and Cindy Busby as Elizabeth Scott, based on the novel of the same name by Teri Wilson.
- Orgulho e Paixão (2018) is a Brazilian telenovela which takes inspiration from all of Austen's major novels (plus Lady Susan), with a focus in Pride and Prejudice. It brings the characters into one single story, set in the beginning of 20th century Brazil. Starring Nathalia Dill as Elisabeta Benedito and Thiago Lacerda as Darcy Williamson.
- Marrying Mr. Darcy (2018) is the continuation of the 2016 Hallmark film adaptation with Ryan Paevey as Mr. Darcy and Cindy Busby as Elizabeth Scott.
- Pride and Prejudice: Atlanta (2019), a made-for-TV movie based on the Jane Austen novel with Tiffany Hines as Elizabeth Bennet and Juan Antonio as Will Darcy.
- Pride and Prejudice, Cut (2019) is a television film adaptation about an American actress being picked to star in a Pride and Prejudice movie, and her struggles to maintain her role due to her inability to adapt to a British accent. Stars Lexi Giovagnoli and David Witts.
- Fire Island (2022), adapts Pride & Prejudice with a contemporary ensemble of men visiting the gay vacation destination, written by Joel Kim Booster, released on Hulu.
- An American in Austen (2024), a Hallmark Channel television movie based on Pride Prejudice with Eliza Bennett as Harriet, an American woman who enters the world of Pride & Prejudice and changes the course of the story. Also starring Nicolas Bishop as Mr. Darcy, Nell Barlow as Elizabeth Bennet, and Catherine Hannay as Jane Bennet.
- The Other Bennet Sister (2026), is a British BBC One television series continuing Pride and Prejudice, following Mary Bennet, Elizabeth's often overlooked sister. Based on the novel, The Other Bennet Sister, the series stars Ella Bruccoleri as Mary and Dónal Finn as love interest Tom Hayward.

==== Other references ====
- In the episode "The Day the Earth Stood Stupid" of Futurama, Fry follows the leader of the brainspawn into several books, including Pride and Prejudice, where Fry is in attendance at a ball where the brain is introduced as the most eligible bachelor.
- In the episode "The Caretaker" of Doctor Who, Clara Oswald is shown teaching the novel to her students and debating biographical details of Austen with the time-travelling Twelfth Doctor, although The Doctor, going undercover as a caretaker, cites the biographical information accompanying her books. Later episodes ("The Magician's Apprentice" and "Face the Raven") hint at a romantic encounter between Clara and Austen.
- In the 2014 board game Marrying Mr Darcy, each player chooses an Austen character to portray, much as one would select the shoe in Monopoly or Miss Scarlett in Clue. The game also has an Emma expansion.

=== Professional theatre ===
- "The Bennets: A Play Without a Plot, Adapted from Jane Austen's Novel ' Pride and Prejudice," by Rosina Filippi (1901)
- Pride and Prejudice (1935), Helen Jerome's Broadway play and the nominal basis for the 1940 film
- First Impressions (1959), Broadway musical version of Pride and Prejudice
- Pride and Prejudice, a straight play version by Jon Jory
- Pride and Prejudice (1995), a musical by Bernard J. Taylor
- Pride and Prejudice (2004), a musical by Lawrence Rush
- I Love You Because, (2006) a musical set in modern-day New York
- Miss Bennet: Christmas at Pemberley (2016), a play by Lauren Gunderson and Margot Melcon
- Kate Hamill's adaptation for the stage premiered at the Hudson Valley Shakespeare Festival in 2017. The production, in which Hamill and her husband play the leading roles of Elizabeth Bennet and Mr. Darcy, transferred to Manhattan's Primary Stages.
- Pride and Prejudice* (*sort of) (2018), an adaptation by Isobel McArthur
- Austen's Pride (2019), a musical by Lindsay Warren Baker and Amanda Jacobs
- Pride and Prejudice (2020), a musical by Paul Gordon
- Prejudice and Pride (2023), by Sam Wright, Off Broadway musical set in modern-day America
- Pride and Prejudice (2024), Dutch musical by Anouk Mass and Tessa Sunniva with all-female cast
- Pride, Prejudice, and Promposals (2024), Taylor Swift jukebox musical that premiered at Orlando Fringe

== Mansfield Park (1814) ==
=== Film and television ===
Year	Adaptation	Fanny Price	Edmund Bertram	Director	Screenwriter	Reference	Notes
1983	Mansfield Park; Television series	Sylvestra Le Touzel	Nicholas Farrell	David Giles	Kenneth Taylor		A BBC production
1999	Mansfield Park; Feature Film	Frances O'Connor	Jonny Lee Miller	Patricia Rozema	Patricia Rozema		
2007	Mansfield Park; Television Movie	Billie Piper	Blake Ritson	Iain B. MacDonald	Maggie Wadey		

==== Looser adaptations ====
- Metropolitan (1990), directed by Whit Stillman, was a loose adaptation set in modern-day Manhattan and Long Island. (Jane Austen is also mentioned throughout the film.)
- From Mansfield With Love (2014), a YouTube vlog adaptation of Mansfield Park by Foot in the Door Theatre, tells the story of Frankie Price, a modern employee of Mansfield Park Hotel, who communicates with her brother in the Navy through videos. The series began in December 2014 and ended November 2015.

=== Theatre ===
- Mansfield Park (2011), a chamber opera by Jonathan Dove, with a libretto by Alasdair Middleton, commissioned and first performed by Heritage Opera, 30 July – 15 August 2011.
- Mansfield Park (2012), stage adaptation by Tim Luscombe, produced by the Theatre Royal, Bury St Edmunds, toured the UK in 2012 and 2013. The play was published by Oberon Books (ISBN 978-1-84943-484-3).

== Emma (1815) ==
=== Film and television ===
Year	Adaptation	Emma Woodhouse	George Knightley	Director	Screenwriter	Reference	Notes
1948	Emma; Feature film	Judy Campbell	Ralph Michael	Michael Barry	Judy Campbell		No recordings are thought to have ever existed. Some photos survive.
1960	Emma; Television miniseries	Diana Fairfax	Paul Daneman	Campbell Logan	Vincent Tilsley		
1967	Emma; Television miniseries	Lola Cardona	Arturo López	Manuel Aguado	Hermogenes Sainz		A five-episode adaptation in Spanish. Likely the earliest surviving screen adaptation of the novel.
1972	Emma; Television miniseries	Doran Godwin	John Carson	John Glenister	Denis Constanduros		
1996	Emma; Feature film	Gwyneth Paltrow	Jeremy Northam	Douglas McGrath	Douglas McGrath		
1996	Emma; Television movie	Kate Beckinsale	Mark Strong	Diarmuid Lawrence	Andrew Davies		
2009	Emma; Television miniseries	Romola Garai	Jonny Lee Miller	Jim O'Hanlon	Sandy Welch		
2020	Emma; Feature Film	Anya Taylor-Joy	Johnny Flynn	Autumn de Wilde	Eleanor Catton		

==== Looser adaptations ====
- Clueless (1995), a modernisation of the novel set in a Beverly Hills high school. The film was directed by Amy Heckerling and stars Alicia Silverstone.
- Clueless (1996), a TV show based on the 1995 film.
- Aisha (2010), a Hindi-language film set in Delhi. It is a modern version of Emma, similar to Clueless. The film was directed by Rajshree Ojha and stars Sonam Kapoor.
- Emma Approved (2013–2014), an Emmy-winning YouTube adaptation in which Emma Woodhouse (Joanna Sotomura) is a matchmaker who documents her ventures into the matchmaking business with her assistant Harriet Smith (Dayeanne Hutton) and confidant Alex Knightley (Brent Bailey).

== Northanger Abbey (1817) ==
=== Film and television ===
Year	Adaptation	Catherine Morland	Henry Tilney	Director	Screenwriter	Reference	Notes
1968	La abadía de Northanger; Television miniseries	Lola Herrera	Pepe Martín	Pedro Amalio López	Ricardo López Aranda		A Spanish TV adaptation loosely based on the novel. This ten-part series is also likely to be the earliest screen adaptation of the book.
1987	Northanger Abbey; Television film	Katharine Schlesinger	Peter Firth	Giles Foster	Maggie Wadey		
2007	Northanger Abbey; Television film	Felicity Jones	JJ Feild	Jon Jones	Andrew Davies		

==== Looser adaptations ====
- "Pup Fiction" (1998), an episode of the children's television series Wishbone, is based on Northanger Abbey. Wishbone plays the role of Henry Tilney, and Amy Acker guest starred as Catherine Moreland.
- Ruby in Paradise (1993), directed by Victor Nuñez, is an homage.
- The Cate Morland Chronicles (2016), a webseries adaptation in which Cate is a journalist and Henry Tilney an actor.

== Persuasion (1817) ==
=== Film and television ===
Year	Adaptation	Anne Elliot	Capt. Frederick Wentworth	Director	Screenwriter	Reference	Notes
1960	Persuasion; Television Miniseries	Daphne Slater	Paul Daneman	Campbell Logan	Barbara Burnham; Michael Voysey		This TV series is believed to be lost; no known copies exist
1971	Persuasion; Television Miniseries	Ann Firbank	Bryan Marshall	Howard Baker	Julian Mitchell		
1972	Persuasión; Television Miniseries	Maite Blasco	Juan Diego	Federico Ruiz	Hermógenes Sainz		A ten-episode adaptation in Spanish.
1995	Persuasion; Television Film	Amanda Root	Ciarán Hinds	Roger Michell	Nick Dear		Originally a Television movie, it was released in US theatres by Sony Pictures Classics.
2007	Persuasion; Television Film	Sally Hawkins	Rupert Penry-Jones	Adrian Shergold	Simon Burke		
2022	Persuasion; Feature Film	Dakota Johnson	Cosmo Jarvis	Carrie Cracknell	Ronald Bass & Alice Victoria Winslow		A Netflix production

==== Looser adaptations ====
- The plot of Helen Fielding's Bridget Jones: The Edge of Reason (1999) is loosely based on Persuasion.
- Rational Creatures is a web series that reimagines Persuasion in modern-day with a Latina lead and several LGBTQ+ characters.
- Modern Persuasion (2020) is a modern-day retelling of the story, set in New York
- Alexa Donne's The Stars We Steal is a science fiction novel that loosely retells Persuasion and also incorporates inspiration from some of Austen's other novels.

== Sanditon (1817/1925) ==
=== Film and television ===
Year	Adaptation	Charlotte Heywood	Sidney Parker	Director	Screenwriter	Reference	Notes
2019	Sanditon; Television series	Rose Williams	Theo James	Andrew Davies	Andrew Davies		

==== Looser adaptations ====
- Welcome To Sanditon (2013), starring Allison Paige, is a modernization of the unfinished novel that is set in the fictitious town of Sanditon, California. The web series is a spin-off of The Lizzie Bennet Diaries created by Hank Green and Bernie Su.

== Lady Susan (1871) ==
=== Film and television ===
Year	Adaptation	Lady Susan	Alicia Johnson	Director	Screenwriter	Reference	Notes
2016	Love & Friendship; Feature film	Kate Beckinsale	Chloë Sevigny	Whit Stillman	Whit Stillman		

== The Watsons (1871) ==
=== Theatre ===
Laura Wade's stage play The Watsons (2018) opens, as does Austen's unfinished novel, with young Emma Watson's entry into society. In an unexpected plot deviation, the nineteenth-century characters confront the twenty-first century playwright (also called Laura) to complain of her fictional manipulation of their actions and to demand their freedom and autonomy.

== Other references ==
=== Her place in the canon ===
In 1994, American literary critic Harold Bloom placed Austen among the greatest Western writers of all time. In a 2002 poll to determine whom the UK public considers the greatest British people in history, Austen was ranked number 70 in the list of the "100 Greatest Britons". In 2003, Austen's Pride and Prejudice came second in the BBC's The Big Read, a national poll to find the "Nation's best-loved book."

In 2007, the article Rejecting Jane by British author David Lassman, which examined how Austen would fare in the modern day publishing industry, achieved worldwide attention when Austen's work—submitted under a pseudonym, and with only minor changes—was rejected by numerous publishers.

On 19 July 2017 a new £10 note was unveiled by the Bank of England at Winchester Cathedral; it came into circulation in September that year. The "Jane Austen bank note" was the result of a 2013 campaign by feminists who noticed a paucity of female represetation: with the planned withdrawal of the Elizabeth Fry £5 note, there would be no notes in circulation featuring a woman (bar the monarch, then Queen Elizabeth II, on the verso). In an early response to the campaign, the outgoing Governor of the Bank of England, Mervyn King, stated that Jane Austen had been a reserve candidate for the previous two years. A month later, his successor Mark Carney confirmed the Austen tenner. The final design was criticised both for image and wording. Historian Lucy Worsley and biographer Paula Byrne described the version of the portrait as an airbrushed makeover that did not represent Austen fairly. The choice of the quote featured -- "I declare after all there is no enjoyment like reading!" -- was challenged by John Mullan, who pointed out the irony of its utterance "by one of Austen's most deceitful characters", Caroline Bingley in Pride and Prejudice, who cares nothing for reading.

Austen also appears as a 5 mm picture on four current £5 notes, as engraved by microartist Graham Short.

=== Modern takes ===
- The 1980 film Jane Austen in Manhattan is about rival stage companies who wish to produce the only complete Austen play, the fictional Sir Charles Grandison, which had been recently discovered.
- The 2007 film The Jane Austen Book Club. based on the novel of the same name b Karen Joy Fowler, is about a group of people who form a Jane Austen discussion group. Much of the dialogue concerns her novels and her personal life.
- In 2010, a mock movie trailer became popular online, satirising the novels and characters of Austen's novels. Titled, Jane Austen's Fight Club, it depicts Elizabeth Bennet leading a bare knuckle boxing therapy group for other Austen characters.
- The 2013 film Austenland is a romantic comedy based on Shannon Hale's novel of the same name, starring Keri Russell as Jane Hayes, a young thirty-something obsessed with Jane Austen who travels to a British resort called Austenland, in which the Austen era is recreated.
- Austen's writing was the inspiration for the 2013 video game Regency Love, a visual novel in which the player interacts with townspeople, friends, family, and potential suitors, looking for a suitable match. The game includes storylines inspired by Austen's writing style, as well as trivia questions about Austen's work.
- Bryan Kozlowski encouraged people to adopt a Georgian diet in The Jane Austen Diet: Austen's Secrets to Food, Health, and Incandescent Happiness.

=== Asides ===
- In the British TV series Blackadder the Third, Mr. E. Blackadder explains he gave himself a female pseudonym when writing a book. Insisting that every other male author is doing it, Blackadder explains that Jane Austen is really a burly Yorkshireman with a heavy beard. In addition to this, in a deliberate nod to the third series being set in the Regency period, each episode had an alliterative title loosely punning Sense and Sensibility, e.g. "Sense and Senility", "Ink and Incapability".
- In the 2001-2003 science fiction book series Remnants, a subculture group called "Janes" emulate the mannerisms and ideals of the characters in Jane Austen's novels.
- The 2005 book Kafka's Soup, a literary pastiche in the form of a cookbook, contains a recipe for tarragon eggs à la Jane Austen.
- Austen is referenced several times in the British science fiction television programme Doctor Who in relation to the ongoing character Clara Oswald, an English teacher who travels in time with the titular character, the Doctor. In "The Caretaker" (eighth series, 2014), she and the Doctor debate historical facts related to Austen, with the Doctor confessing his knowledge of Austen stems from a biography. In 2015, Austen is referenced twice in ninth series, by which time it is indicated that Clara has by this point met the author (though this is not depicted on screen), with references hinting at romantic attraction between the two (in keeping with the series hinting that Clara is bisexual). In "The Magician's Apprentice", Clara describes Austen to her students as an "amazing writer, astonishing comic observer and, strictly between ourselves, a phenomenal kisser." Later in Series 9, in "Face the Raven", Clara tells a friend that she and Austen would play tricks on each other, ending with Clara stating: "I love her. Take that how you like." Face the Raven author Sara Dollard stated that she originally planned for the episode to include a scene featuring Austen and Clara, but it was cut before production.
- Austen is also referenced in the 2018 game Plants Vs Zombies Heroes, where she is referred in the Parasol Zombie's description as Brain Austen.

== See also ==
- Jane Austen's literary universe
- The Jane Austen Season

== Bibliography ==
- Cano, Marina. Jane Austen and Performance. Cham, Switzerland: Palgrave Macmillan, 2017. ISBN 978-3-319-43987-7.
- Macdonald, Gina and Andrew Macdonald, eds. Jane Austen on Screen. Cambridge: Cambridge University Press, 2003. ISBN 978-0-521-79325-4.
- Pucci, Suzanne Rodin and James Thompson, eds. Jane Austen and Co.: Remaking the Past in Contemporary Culture. Buffalo: State University of New York Press, 2003. ISBN 978-0-7914-5615-6.
- Troost, Linda and Sayre Greenfield, eds. Jane Austen in Hollywood. 2nd ed. Lexington: University Press of Kentucky, 2001. ISBN 978-0-8131-9006-8.
