= Northanger Abbey (2007 film) =

2007 television film directed by Jon Jones

- Region 2 DVD cover
- Genre: Costume drama
- Based on: Northanger Abbey by Jane Austen
- Screenplay by: Andrew Davies
- Directed by: Jon Jones
- Starring: Felicity Jones; JJ Feild; Carey Mulligan
- Narrated by: Geraldine James
- Theme music composer: Charlie Mole
- Country of origin: United Kingdom
- Original language: English

Production
- Producer: Keith Thompson
- Cinematography: Ciarán Tanham
- Editor: Sue Wyatt
- Running time: 86 minutes
- Production companies: Granada Productions; WGBH Boston
- Budget: £2 million

Original release
- Network: ITV
- Release: 25 March 2007

Northanger Abbey is a 2007 British television film adaptation of Jane Austen's 1817 novel of the same name. It was directed by British television director Jon Jones and the screenplay was written by Andrew Davies. Felicity Jones stars as the protagonist Catherine Morland and JJ Feild plays her love interest Henry Tilney.

The story unfolds as the teenaged Catherine is invited to Bath to accompany some family friends. There she finds herself the object of Henry Tilney's and John Thorpe's (William Beck) affections. When she stays at Northanger Abbey, Catherine's youthful and naive imagination takes hold, and she begins to confuse real life with the Gothic romance of her favourite novels.

Northanger Abbey was one of three novels adapted for ITV's Jane Austen season. It was shot on location in Ireland from late August 2006 on a budget of £2 million. The drama was co-produced by Granada Productions and American studio WGBH Boston. Northanger Abbey premiered on 25 March 2007 in the United Kingdom and on 16 December 2007 in Canada. It was broadcast in the United States and Australia in 2008. The drama was viewed by 5.6 million people in the UK, making it the second most watched of the 2007 adaptations. Northanger Abbey garnered mostly positive reviews from television critics, with many praising the cast's performances.

== Plot ==
Seventeen-year-old Catherine Morland, daughter of Mr. and Mrs. Morland, is a tomboy with a wild imagination and a passion for Gothic novels. Family friends Mr. and Mrs. Allen invite Catherine to spend the season in Bath and she readily accepts. At her first ball, Catherine meets and dances with Henry Tilney. The following day, Catherine makes the acquaintance of the Thorpe family. She becomes good friends with Isabella Thorpe and she meets Isabella's brother, John, when she is reunited with her own brother, James.

John flirts with Catherine at a ball, but she is more interested in meeting with Henry and his sister, Eleanor. Catherine is pressured by Isabella and John into riding to Blaise Castle, despite having made plans for a walk with Henry and Eleanor. John assures her that he saw Henry driving a phaeton to Wick Rocks, but while Catherine is in John's carriage, she sees the Tilneys walking along the street. Catherine asks John to stop, knowing he lied to her, but he refuses. Catherine runs into the Tilney family at the opera and makes her apologies, before planning another walk. John tells Henry's father, General Tilney, that Catherine is the Allens' heir, and the General invites her to spend the day with the family. Catherine is delighted when she learns Henry and Eleanor love books as much as she does.

On her return home, Isabella tells Catherine that she and James are engaged. James and John announce that they are to leave Bath for a few weeks and after talking about marriage with Catherine, John leaves believing she is in love with him. Isabella catches the eye of Henry's older brother, Captain Frederick Tilney, and flirts with him after she learns how low James' income will be. General Tilney invites Catherine to stay with his family at Northanger Abbey and she accepts. When Isabella tells Catherine that John is going to propose to her, Catherine tells her friend to write to him and explains that he is mistaken. Isabella continues to flirt with Frederick and Catherine asks Henry to convince his brother to leave her alone. However, he tells Catherine that Frederick will be leaving town soon to re-join his regiment.

Catherine states that Northanger Abbey looks exactly as she imagined it and she becomes intrigued by Mrs. Tilney's death. Due to her overactive imagination, Catherine starts to believe that General Tilney murdered his wife. Henry catches her in his mother's chamber and becomes offended when he realises what she has been thinking. Catherine apologises and Henry tells her that perhaps it is possible to read too many novels. Catherine receives a letter from James, in which he reveals that his engagement to Isabella has been called off, because she allowed Frederick to seduce her. Eleanor explains to Catherine that her brother has no intention of marrying Isabella. Catherine gets a letter from Isabella, asking her to apologise to James for her, but Catherine states that she will do no such thing.

General Tilney returns home from a trip away and orders Eleanor to send Catherine home to Fullerton that night. Catherine endures the trip alone and believes that Henry told the General about her suspicions. A few days later, Henry comes to Fullerton and explains that the General discovered that Catherine's family were not as rich as John led him to believe. He apologises for his father's actions and explains that even though he will probably be disinherited, he loves Catherine and proposes. Catherine accepts and the couple marry.

== Cast ==
- Felicity Jones as Catherine Morland
- JJ Feild as Henry Tilney
- Catherine Walker as Eleanor Tilney
- Carey Mulligan as Isabella Thorpe
- William Beck as John Thorpe
- Hugh O’Conor as James Morland
- Sylvestra Le Touzel as Mrs. Allen
- Desmond Barrit as Mr. Allen
- Liam Cunningham as General Tilney
- Mark Dymond as Captain Tilney
- Bernadette McKenna as Mrs. Thorpe
- Julia Dearden as Mrs. Morland
- Gerry O’Brien as Mr. Morland

== Production ==
=== Conception and adaptation ===
"People think Austen is a lot more romantic and straightforward than she actually is. She is quite practical about love and relationships – she's very measured about who people should marry. What's quite interesting with Henry Tilney is that he doesn't necessarily fall madly in love with Catherine straight away. It's a very gradual development, and it's her enthusiasm for him that prompts him to return her affections. It's very subtle how she draws her characters, which is what I like."

— Felicity Jones commenting on Austen's writing.

On 10 November 2005, Julia Day from The Guardian reported that ITV controller of drama, Nick Elliott, had ordered three new adaptations of Mansfield Park, Northanger Abbey and Persuasion. Elliot commented that the adaptations would be "important remakes for the new generation". He explained, "About every 10 years, all the great stories need retelling. These films will be very much 2007 films... we've asked and pushed the production team to make them young. Her stories always make great TV drama and our Jane Austen season will feature the absolute cream of British acting talent." Elliott revealed that he had deliberately shied away from ordering adaptations of Pride and Prejudice and Sense and Sensibility to focus on Austen's lesser known works. Each of the productions were made by a different company, cast, and directors, so they had "a distinct look". They were also made to appeal to a younger audience that might have previously switched off other Austen adaptations. Northanger Abbey was given a budget of £2 million, and it marked only the second filmed adaptation of the book; with the first being made and broadcast in 1987.

Andrew Davies, the screenwriter who adapted Pride and Prejudice for the BBC, was commissioned to write the script for Northanger Abbey. He had previously written an adaptation of the novel for Weekend Television in 1998. It was optioned by Harvey Weinstein for Miramax Films and drafts from other writers were added, before the project was abandoned. Davies told The Daily Telegraph's Hugh Davies that Northanger Abbey was much more straightforward to adapt than Pride and Prejudice, which was "quite a fiendish bit of compression". The reporter explained, "A young heroine thinks she has stumbled across a Gothic conspiracy of murder and concealed corpses. In fact, the true crimes are those of psychological cruelty and selfishness. Davies said that part of the back story was having the heroine read the 1764 best-seller The Castle of Otranto by Horace Walpole, which he uses to fill Catherine's head with the expectation of unspeakable secrets in the Abbey." The writer admitted that he used artistic license when it came to the scene in which Catherine's friend, Isabella, goes off with Captain Frederick Tilney. Austen did not state what happened to them in the novel, but Davies believed Frederick would have seduced Isabella.

During an interview with Marion McMullen from the Coventry Evening Telegraph, Davies explained that the Gothic elements to the novel gave him inspiration to add dream sequences and fantasies to the script. He told McMullen, "I've been very faithful to the book, but one of the differences has been writing the scenes showing Catherine's fantasies. Catherine is a great reader of horror fiction – the gothic novel was fairly popular in those days, like a young girl today who would read a lot of rather steamy romances. In this production, we see some of Catherine's fantasies, some of which are quite steamy for a young girl." Davies admitted that he was proud of his reputation for "sexing up" the novels he had adapted and commented that none of his scenes were gratuitous. He told McMullen that he often looked for excuses to get the characters out of their clothes, as he felt they were always being "buttoned up to the neck". Producer Keith Thompson said Davies had made Northanger Abbey a bit more erotic than the novel and thought the script had "a wonderful cheekiness to it." Davies chose to use a narrator to speak Austen's words and help set the scene at the beginning and end of the film.

=== Casting ===
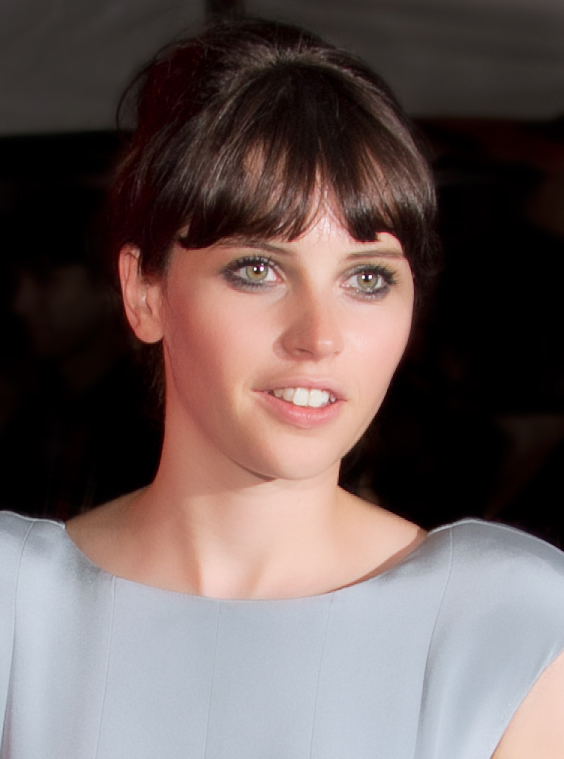
Felicity Jones portrayed Northanger Abbey's heroine, Catherine Morland.

Karen Price from the Western Mail reported ITV were looking for "big names" and promised the best British acting talent, while they were casting the three adaptations. In July 2006, Thompson revealed the cast had yet to be confirmed and that the casting agent, John Hubbard, was "scouring" Ireland and the United Kingdom for actors to fit the roles. On 14 August, a writer for the Irish Film and Television Network stated the casting for Northanger Abbey had finished and had been confirmed. British actress Felicity Jones was chosen to play Catherine, the protagonist and eldest daughter of the Morland family. Jones received the part upon her first audition, just two weeks after graduating from Oxford University. She revealed that she really wanted the role, explaining "sometimes when you read a script, you think 'God, I'd love to do that.'" While speaking of his fondness for the characters, Davies commented that Jones' casting as Catherine was "perfect". American-born actor JJ Feild was cast as Henry Tilney, the "highly eligible young clergyman", and William Beck received the role of John Thorpe, Henry's rival for Catherine's affections.

Actress Carey Mulligan was given the role of Catherine's shallow and selfish friend Isabella Thorpe. The actress had previously worked with Davies on an adaptation of Bleak House. Speaking to Graham Fuller of The Arts Desk, Mulligan commented, "I wanted to play Isabella because I'd never played a character like that before." Irish actor Hugh O'Conor was chosen to play James Morland, Catherine's brother and Isabella's fiancé. Other Irish actors cast in the production included Liam Cunningham as the "eccentric" General Tilney and Gerry O'Brien and Julia Dearden as Mr. and Mrs. Morland respectively. Desmond Barrit and Sylvestra Le Touzel were cast as Mr. and Mrs. Allen, the wealthier older couple who invite Catherine to go to Bath with them. Le Touzel previously portrayed Fanny Price in the 1983 adaptation of Mansfield Park. Catherine Walker and Mark Dymond appeared as Henry's siblings Eleanor and Captain Tilney. Geraldine James was credited as the narrator and voice of Austen.

=== Filming ===
Northanger Abbey was shot on location in Ireland from late August 2006. The Independent's Sarah Shannon stated that ITV had filmed in the country "largely thanks to the generous tax incentives offered by the republic's government." Filming lasted for five weeks and the drama was shot on Super 16 mm film. Twenty-first century Dublin streets doubled for nineteenth century Bath, the setting for the novel. Shannon thought some viewers might be annoyed with this and Thompson commented, "But isn't that shot of the Royal Crescent in Bath a bit of a cliché? What we've done is create our own Bath." Lismore Castle in County Waterford was chosen as Northanger Abbey, home of the Tilney family. Higginsbrook House, near Trim, County Meath, served as the exterior to the Morland family's home. The house was later used in Becoming Jane, a film about Austen's early life. Other shooting locations included Dublin Castle, Ardbraccan House and Charleville Castle. Jones told Paul Byrne of the Evening Herald that she enjoyed shooting in Ireland as she got to see a lot of the country.

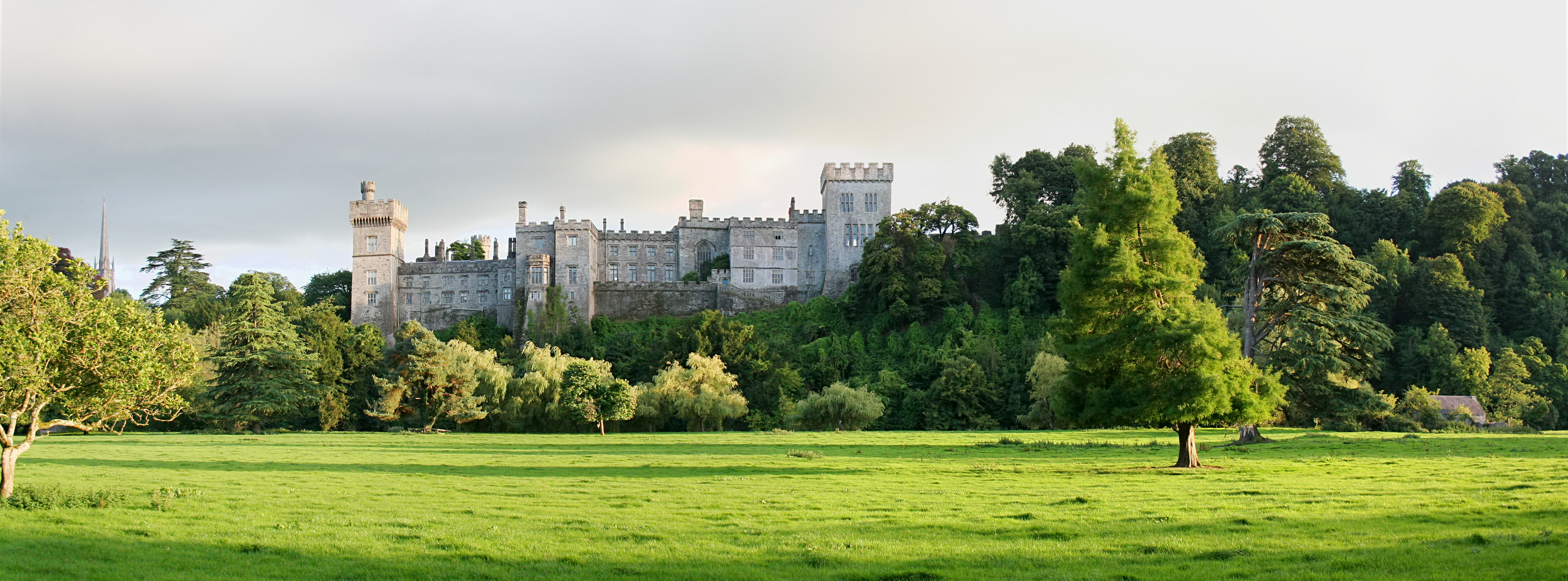
Lismore Castle served as Northanger Abbey

=== Music and choreography ===
British composer Charlie Mole wrote the score to Northanger Abbey, while the Pemberley Players provided other authentic pieces of music. Sue Mythen choreographed the ballroom scenes. Speaking to Benji Wilson of the Radio Times, Jones revealed the dance sessions were the most taxing part of the shoot. She explained that the cast had to learn all of the ballroom dances from scratch and they spent a week going over them to make sure they were right. She explained, "But what happens is as soon as you put the dialogue in, the dancing just goes to pot! So it's all about putting the movement and the dialogue together and remembering what your character is supposed to be thinking at the same time – that's quite tricky!" Jones praised Mythen and said the teacher often reminded the actors to relax into the dance and remember that their character would have been doing it for years, as they would have learnt at an early age. Jones added "the novelty for us with three weeks of dancing is not quite the same!"

== Promotion and broadcast ==
ITV launched a nationwide campaign to promote its Jane Austen Season. The campaign included three television adverts and cinema, outdoor and press adverts. ITV Creative made the 20, 30 and 60 second promotional trailers, which began airing on ITV channels from 25 February 2007. The following day adverts began appearing in selected national press publications. The outdoor and press adverts were created by M&C Saatchi and MindShare carried out the media buying.

Northanger Abbey was the second of the Austen adaptations to be shown in the UK. It was broadcast on ITV at 9:00 pm on 25 March 2007. The drama aired on the TVOntario channel in Canada on 16 December 2007. Northanger Abbey was shown on 20 January 2008 on the US channel PBS as part of their Austen Masterpiece Theatre series. On 15 June, the film was broadcast on Australia's ABC1 channel.

=== Home media ===
Northanger Abbey was released on a single disc DVD and as part of a box-set in the UK on 26 March 2007. The Region 1 DVD was released on 22 January 2008. In April of that year, ITV announced they would be making a range of classic programmes, including the adaptation of Northanger Abbey, available to purchase through the iTunes Store.

== Reception ==
Upon its first broadcast in the United Kingdom, Northanger Abbey was viewed by 5.6 million people and had a 26.6% audience share. This made it the second most popular of the adaptations, behind Mansfield Park. 931,000 Australians watched the drama when it aired on ABC1 in June 2008. Northanger Abbey garnered mostly positive reviews from critics. Shortly before it aired in the UK, reporters for four newspaper publications selected the drama as their "Pick of the Day." Jade Wright of the Liverpool Echo thought the adaptation showed "a good-natured and frank Catherine", with Jones managing to "combine humility and humour with perfect aplomb." Wright praised the decision to cast Mulligan and said the actress "shone" as Isabella. A The Guardian reporter included Northanger Abbey in their feature on the week's television highlights, saying "Yes, yes, more Austin [sic], but Andrew Davies' adaptation of one of her lighter novels is the perfect Sunday evening blend of eruditeness and pretty frocks."

The Sydney Morning Herald's Lenny Ann Low also praised the cast and their performances, stating "Lush with straining bosoms, knowing looks and segments bringing Morland's wild dreams and fantasies to life, Northanger Abbey is well cast. Felicity Jones catches Morland's mix of youthful naivety, heart-whole feelings and mindful beliefs perfectly and J.J. Feild, as the dishy but sensible Tilney, grows in appeal as this feature-length drama builds to a climax." Low's colleague, Joyce Morgan later selected Northanger Abbey as one of the week's best television programmes. However, Ruth Ritchie, writing for the same newspaper, stated that the makers of the adaptation tried "desperately to create an air of mystery about the dastardly deeds at Northanger Abbey," but the audience knew it was about as scary as "a ninja turtle." Ritchie likened the ITV Austen adaptations to a "Posh Country Home and Away." Mary McNamara of the Los Angeles Times wrote "Northanger Abbey the novel was as fun as it gets for Austen, and the television film quite lives up to the same standard."

Ginia Bellafante, a critic for The New York Times, proclaimed the drama gave the audience "innocent faces and heaving breasts, hyperbolizing the sex that always lurks beneath the surface of Austen's astringent presence." She went on to say Northanger Abbey was made to be a television movie and commented that it was more fun than the book. The San Francisco Chronicle's David Wiegand wrote "Persuasion is a bigger challenge to try to squeeze into 90 minutes, the real difference between that film and Northanger is the latter's consistency of high-quality performances, a careful and attentive adaptation by Andrew Davies and solid direction by Jon Jones." Writing for The Daily Telegraph, James Walton observed "Northanger Abbey was a perfectly acceptable costume drama – but not one that ever really caught fire." Simon Hoggart, writing for The Spectator, commented that Davies's adaptation of Northanger Abbey "was much bolder and more confident than Mansfield Park the week before."

The Hollywood Reporter's Ray Bennett praised Northanger Abbey, calling it "a wonderfully evocative version", which was "written with flair and imagination by Andrew Davies". He proclaimed "Capturing vividly the flush and wonder of adolescence, the film mines Austen's first-written but last-published novel to find purest nuggets of wit, romance and social satire. The story's 18th-century heroine, Catherine Morland, has a fevered imagination and Davies draws on Austen's droll illustrations of it to create scenes of gothic adventure." Bennett added "the film is shot beautifully by Ciarán Tanham while composer Charlie Mole's score adds to the quickening pace of Catherine's fantasies." For his work on Northanger Abbey, cinematographer Tanham was nominated for Best Director of Photography at the 5th Irish Film and Television Awards.
