= The Diary of Anne Frank (1987 TV series) =

1987 British television series directed by Gareth Davies

The Diary of Anne Frank is 1987 four-part BBC television drama. It was based on The Diary of a Young Girl by Anne Frank, and it starred Katharine Schlesinger as Frank, with the cast also including Elizabeth Bell, Janet Amsbury, and Emrys James. It was directed by Gareth Davies and produced by Terrance Dicks.

== Cast ==
- Katharine Schlesinger as Anne Frank
- Emrys James as Otto Frank
- Elizabeth Bell as Edith Frank
- Emma Harbour as Margot Frank
- Christopher Benjamin as Mr van Daan
- Steven Mackintosh as Peter van Daan
- Susan Tracy as Petronella van Daan
- David Swift as Albert Dussel
- Janet Amsbury as Miep Gies
- Nigel Anthony as Mr Kraler

== See also ==
- List of films about Anne Frank
- List of Holocaust films
