= The Jane Austen Season =

Special season of television films and series

The Jane Austen Season is a British television series of dramas based on the novels by Jane Austen. The season began on ITV at 9:00 p.m. on Sunday 18 March 2007 with Mansfield Park. The following week, Northanger Abbey was broadcast. The season ended with Persuasion on Sunday 1 April 2007. A repeat of the 1996 feature-length film Emma was broadcast on Friday 6 April 2007. The combined ITV and BBC series, titled The Complete Jane Austen, was shown in the United States by the PBS Masterpiece Theatre drama anthology television series from January through April 2008.

== United Kingdom ==
ITV's The Jane Austen Season consisted of the following television films.

- Mansfield Park – first aired on 18 March 2007.
- Northanger Abbey – first aired on 25 March 2007.
- Persuasion – first aired on 1 April 2007.
- Emma – first aired on 24 November 1996 (rebroadcast on 6 April 2007).

== United States ==
The following films and miniseries were first aired in the United States on WGBH-TV as part of the PBS Masterpiece series The Complete Jane Austen.

- Persuasion – 13 January 2008. Sally Hawkins stars as Anne Elliot.
- Northanger Abbey – 20 January 2008. Felicity Jones plays romance addict Catherine Morland.
- Mansfield Park – 27 January 2008. Austen's most complex plot stars Billie Piper as Fanny Price.
- Miss Austen Regrets – 3 February 2008. Olivia Williams plays the titular role in this biopic dramatizing Austen's lost loves.
- Pride and Prejudice – 10–24 February 2008. Colin Firth portrays Mr. Darcy and Jennifer Ehle portrays Elizabeth Bennet.
- Emma (1996) – 23 March 2008. Kate Beckinsale stars in the title role.

- Emma (2009) – 4–25 October 2009. Romola Garai portrays Emma. (Note: This newer version of Emma premiered a year after all of the other titles and was included in subsequent rebroadcasts of the US edition of the Jane Austen special. It also replaced the older version of Emma in the PBS official website, which included the TV special's episodes available to watch online.)

- Sense and Sensibility – 30 March – 6 April 2008. Hattie Morahan plays Elinor Dashwood, and Charity Wakefield plays her sister, Marianne.

== See also ==
- Jane Austen in popular culture
- List of Masterpiece Classic episodes (Season 38)
