= Katharine Schlesinger =

British actress (born 1963)

- Born: Katharine Anne Schlesinger; 29 April 1963 (age 63); Islington, London, England
- Years active: 1984–present

Katharine Schlesinger (born 29 April 1963) is a British actress. In 1987, she starred as Catherine Morland in the BBC Television adaptation of Jane Austen's Northanger Abbey and Anne Frank in the BBC's The Diary of Anne Frank. She is the niece of the film director John Schlesinger and the great-niece of Dame Peggy Ashcroft.

== Theatre ==
In 1990, Schlesinger listed her earlier provincial stage work as:

- Romeo and Juliet at the Sheffield Crucible;
- Agnes of God, Stags and Hens, Martin Chuzzlewit and Fair Stood the Wind for France, at the Theatre Royal Northampton;
- The Marvelous Land of Oz at the Leeds Playhouse;
- Nell Dunn's The Little Heroine at the Nuffield Theatre, Southampton.

Listed London work included:

- A Midsummer Night's Dream, The Merry Wives of Windsor and Bashville, at the Open Air Theatre, Regent's Park (1984);
- The Secret Diary of Adrian Mole, Aged 13¾ at the Wyndham's Theatre (December 1984);
- Three Sisters at the Greenwich Theatre (March 1987) and the Albery Theatre (June 1987);
- The Living Room at the Royalty Theatre (October 1987).

Schlesinger made her National Theatre debut in 1988 as Grace Wellborn in Ben Jonson's Bartholomew Fair staged in the Olivier Theatre, followed in 1989 by her role as Jacinta in the Cottesloe revival of Lope de Vega's Fuenteovejuna. In November 1989, again at the National, she played the title role in Steven Berkoff's symbolist stage adaptation of Oscar Wilde's Salome, a production which transferred to the Phoenix Theatre in January 1990. According to critic Robert Tanitch, "Katharine Schlesinger mimed the dance of the seven veils and, without having taken anything off, persuaded a hushed audience that she was standing there totally naked."

In February 1991, at the Royal Court's Theatre Upstairs, Schlesinger took part in performances of selected plays in the Young Writers' Festival. Since then no further London stage credits for Katharine Schlesinger have been listed in the Theatre Record annual Indexes.

== Audio work ==
Schlesinger's audio work includes William Shakespeare's Love's Labour's Lost and Henry VIII.

She also sang the period song That's the Way to the Zoo in her appearance in the Doctor Who serial Ghost Light (1989).

== Select filmography ==
- In the Beginning .... Miriam (TVM 2000)
- Simon Magus .... Askha (1999)
- The Tale of Sweeney Todd .... Lucy (TVM 1998)
- The Bill - Puzzled .... Nicky (TV series)
- Silent Witness - An Academic Exercise .... Dr Annabelle Evans (TV series)
- Rides .... Sue-Lyn (TV series, 1992–93)
- Young Catherine .... Elizabeth Vorontsova (TV mini-series, 1991)
- Doctor Who - Ghost Light .... Gwendoline (October 1989)
- Madame Sousatzka .... Piano Student (film, director John Schlesinger, 1988)
- No Frills .... Suzy (TV sitcom, 1988)
- The Diary of Anne Frank .... Anne Frank (TVM 1987)
- Northanger Abbey .... Catherine Morland (TVM 1987)
