= Virginia Tanner Green =

American suffragist (1881–1950)

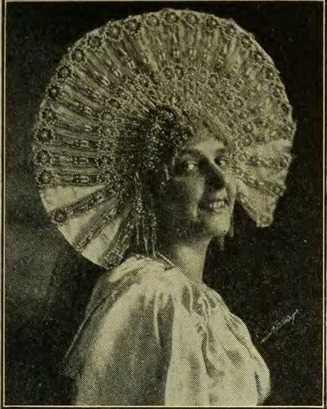
- Born: November 24, 1881; Boston, Massachusetts, U.S.
- Died: August 7, 1950 (aged 68); New Castle, New Hampshire, U.S.
- Occupations: Writer, pageant director, theatrical designer

Carolyn Virginia Tanner Green (November 24, 1881 – August 7, 1950) was an American dancer based in Cambridge, Massachusetts, who wrote and directed plays and pageants, and participated in the women's suffrage movement.

== Early life and education ==
Green was born in Boston, Massachusetts, the daughter of John Alexander Tanner and Caroline Maria Littlefield Tanner. Her father was a physician. She graduated from Radcliffe College in 1905, and earned a master's degree from Radcliffe in 1906. "My college work made me a keen student of the ancient dance steps, created a desire to study into the ways of forgotten ages and to seek out new music and dance meters", she explained of her education's value.

== Career ==
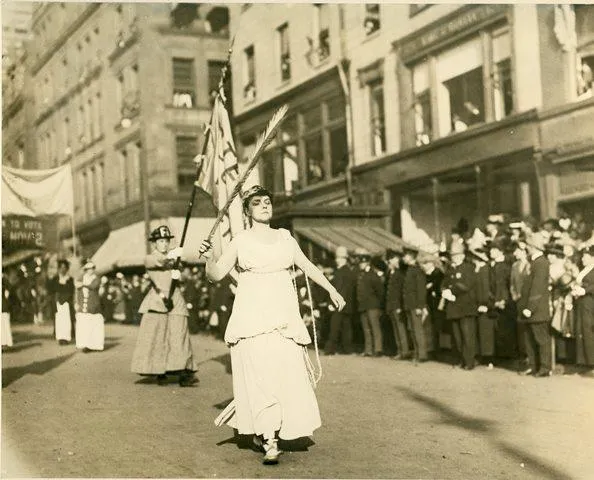
Green leading a parade in Boston in 1915

Green was an active suffragist and civic pageant organizer in the 1910s. She demonstrated "ancient" dances at a lecture in Boston in 1910. She worked with the Children's Playground Association in Baltimore on a 1912 pageant. She performed as a dancer and directed a pageant for the annual fête in Rockport in 1913. In 1914 she directed a historical procession in Stonington, Connecticut, and the dance segments of the Brooklyn Historical Pageant. In 1915, she portrayed "Victory" Boston suffrage parade, and wrote, directed, and starred in a Greek-inspired pageant in Maine. She staged Gluck's Orpheus in 1916, to raise funds for Radcliffe's Choral Society Scholarship Fund.

In 1922 Green directed Dear Jane, a romantic comedy about Jane Austen, written by Eleanor Holmes Hinkley. She wrote and directed "The Pageant of Portsmouth", a 1923 event with a cast of hundreds, marking the New Hampshire city's tercentenary. She directed a pageant at Bennington's sesquicentennial celebration in 1927. In 1928 she wrote a pageant to dedicate the Carlton Bridge in Bath, Maine. In 1930 she directed a musical comedy, The Sky Scrapers, at Radcliffe College. She was elected commissioner of the Cambridge Girl Scouts in 1931.

Green was a member of the Drama League of America, the Daughters of the American Revolution, Zonta International, the New England History Society, and the Cambridge Historical Society.

== Personal life ==
Tanner married judge Louis Lawrence Green in 1914. They had a daughter, Lois. Green died in 1950, at the age of 68, in New Castle, New Hampshire.
