= Artrix, Bromsgrove =

Arts centre in Bromsgrove, England

Coordinates: 52.33867°N 2.05155°W

Artrix Arts Centre (Bromsgrove's Theatre, Cinema, Live Music and Comedy Venue)
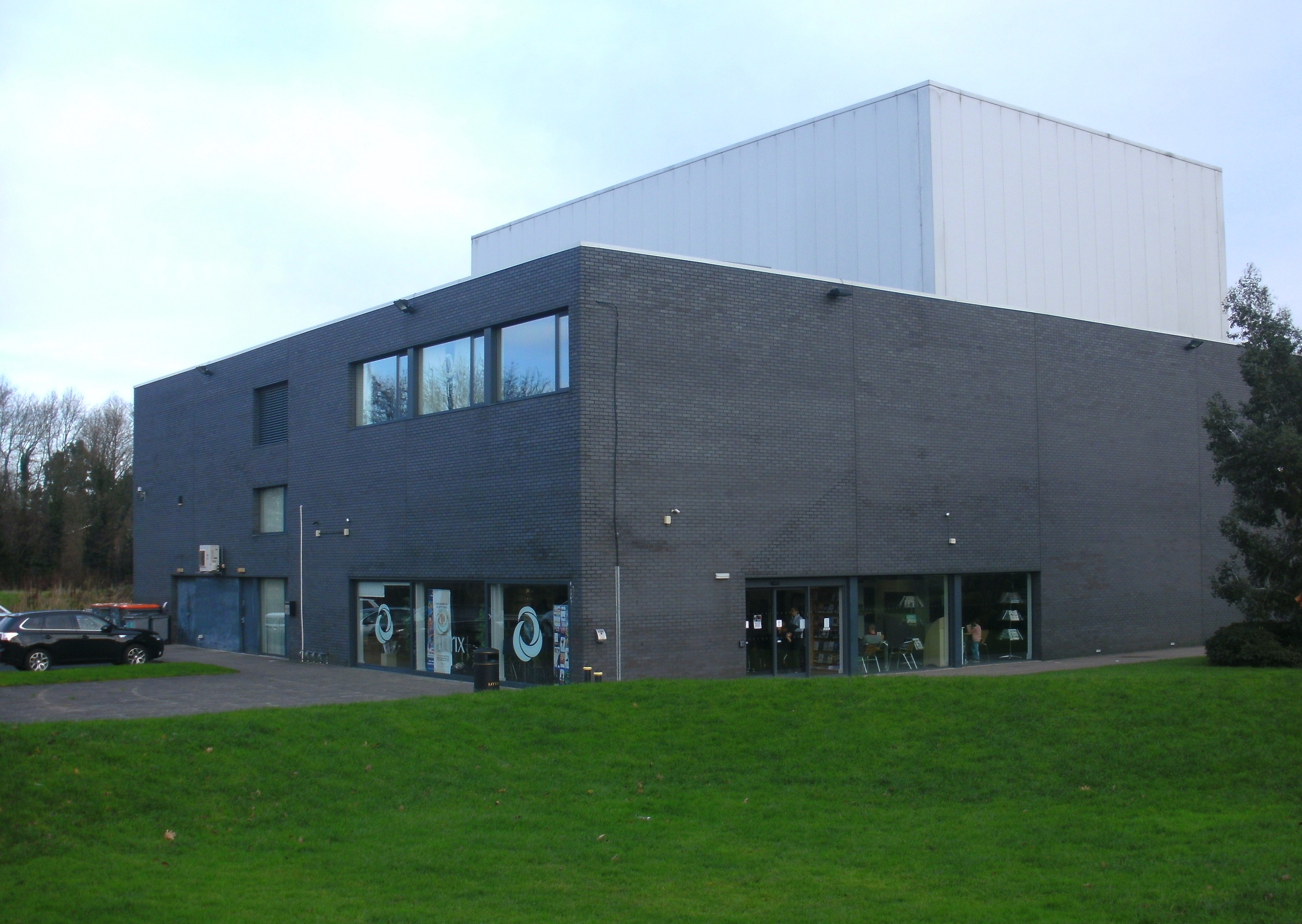
- Artrix
- Interactive map of Artrix Arts Centre (Bromsgrove's Theatre, Cinema, Live Music and Comedy Venue)
- Address: School Drive; Bromsgrove; United Kingdom
- Capacity: 300 seats on 2 levels (main house); 70 to 90 seats (studio)
- Production: Various

Construction
- Opened: 2005
- Architect: Glenn Howells

Website
- www.artrix.co.uk

Artrix is an arts venue in Bromsgrove, England, located on School Drive just outside the town centre. The building was constructed between 2004 and 2005 on a green field site sold off by the Heart of Worcestershire College Bromsgrove campus (formerly NEWcollege) in 1999 and the Bromsgrove 'Blue Light' centre.

It hosts theatre and dance performances, cinema screenings, live music including touring bands, solo artists, touring theatre and both ballet and contemporary dance. Performance of classical music and comedy from well-known performers to circuit comedians. It also works with local groups and organisations as part of Bromsgrove Arts Alive which provides space for theatre performances, a Pantomime a classical music club, spoken word talks (featuring playwright, novelists, poets and historians) and productions by local dance schools.

Artrix also has a very active learning and engagement department that coordinates many projects including a youth theatre group and projects in the community for all ages and social standing.

The main auditorium has a seating capacity of approximately 301. The seating in both venues can be dismantled to create open spaces for events. Four multipurpose rooms are available for meetings and during productions as dressing rooms. The building also contains a rehearsal room/dance studio on the second floor which since 2013 has been regularly used as a studio theatre in addition to its main house for small scale theatre, music and spoken word with a seated capacity of 90. There is an art gallery on the three floors of the venue.

Both the main house and the studio are soundproofed and are not linked structurally within the building, in order to eliminate sound conduction between the two. There is a licensed cafe-bar.

In 2018 the centre lost funding from Bromsgrove District Council, Worcestershire County Council and Heart of Worcestershire College and started to struggle financially. At the start of the COVID-19 lockdown a series of large long-term contract hires came to an end and the sudden halt to activities led to the charitable trust operating the centre running out of funds and entering into voluntary liquidation. The assets were purchased by Bromsgrove District Council with the intention of looking at options to re-open the venue once the situation improved. The venue was used as the COVID mass vaccination centre for Bromsgrove. Several groups are looking at options to reopen the venue.
