= Nihal Yeğinobalı =

Turkish writer (1927–2020)

- Born: Zeynep Nihal; 16 November 1927; Manisa, Turkey
- Died: 14 March 2020 (aged 92); Istanbul, Turkey
- Education: Literature
- Alma mater: Arnavutkoey American High School for Girls; State University of New York
- Writing career
- Language: Turkish, English
- Genres: Novel, translation

Zeynep Nihal Yeğinobalı (16 November 1927 - 14 March 2020) was a Turkish novelist and translator.

== Private life ==
Zeynep Nihal was born in Manisa on 16 November 1927. She moved to Istanbul when she was eight years old. Following the primary school, she attended American College for Girls (ACG45), and upon graduation in 1945, went to the United States to study literature in the State University of New York. After living eight years in the United States, she returned to Turkey.

Yeğinobalı died in Istanbul at the age of 92 on 14 March 2020.

== Career ==
She used the pen names "Süreyya Sarıca" and"Vincent Ewing". She was a young woman when she published her first translation of the 1904 novel The Garden of Allah by Robert Hichens (1864-1950) into Allah’ın Bahçesi in 1946, and her first novel Genç Kızlar ("Young Girls") in 1950, which was an example of fictitious translation by her pen name "Vincent Ewing".

She translated many classical and contemporary works of writers, including Laurence Sterne (713–1768), Jane Austen (1775–1817), Charlotte Brontë (1816–1855), W.M. Thackeray (1811–1863), Charles Dickens (1812–1870), Thomas Hardy (1840–1928), Lewis Carroll (1832–1898), Oscar Wilde ,(1854–1900), Mark Twain (1835–1910), J. M. Barrie (1860–1937), D. H. Lawrence (1885–1930), L. Frank Baum (1856–1919), John Steinbeck (1902–1968), Pearl S. Buck (1892–1973), Mikhail Sholokhov (905–1984), Carlos Fuentes (1928–2012), Isabel Allende (born 1942), Eduardo Galeano (1940–2015), Patrick White (1912–1990), Iris Murdoch (1919–1999) and D. M. Thomas (born 1935).

Her writings and translations were also published in periodicals like Hafta, 100 Roman, Yıldız, Hayat and Akbaba. She must have been a forceful personality —not many girls of her age would have been able to talk a publishing company into printing her translation of a new and exciting book by an American writer, a writer, who never existed. Yeginobali, a keen young writer at the time, wanted to write a novel about life at a girls’ college, but was tired of being turned down by publishing companies, which kept telling her that she was too young to be a writer. She also felt that the eroticism in her writing might be an overdose for readers of the time, especially coming from a young woman like herself. Aware that translated novels were much more in demand than work by new Turkish writers, she plotted, and convinced a publishing company to expect a chapter of translation (!) from Vincent Ewing’s book each week.

The book hit the bestseller list in no time. Though Yeğinobalı was initially planning to reveal her identity, after the book came out to so much attention, she decided to keep at her game, and enjoy the commentaries from her hidden corner.

Finally, in 2004, to coincide with a reprint of the novel by Can Publishing, Yeğinobalı decided that the time had come to add on her own name next to that of Vincent Ewing’s. The book’s new issue is among the publisher’s bestseller novels. She recently wrote her memoirs, Cumhuriyet Çocuğu ("The Republic’s Child"), published by Can Yayınları in 2005. Spanning the first ten years of her life, Yeğinobalı’s memoirs provide the reader with a vivid picture of life in a small Anatolian town during the very first years of the Republic. Filmmakers are currently interested in her two other novels Mazi Kalbimde bir Yaradır (1988), and Sitem (1998), which suggest subtle readings of suppressed sexuality in Turkish society.

== Works ==
=== Own works ===
Her major works are:

Novels

1. Yeğinobalı, Nihal (19 March 2014) [1950]. Genç Kızlar (6 ed.). Can Yayınları. p. 376. ISBN 978-975-070-305-8.
2. Eflatun Kız 1964 (Novel)
3. Yeğinobalı, Nihal (7 September 2005) [1988]. Mazi Kalbimde Bir Yaradır (1 ed.). Doğan Kitap. p. 328. ISBN 975-293-368-8.
4. Yeğinobalı, Nihal (9 August 2005) [1998]. Sitem (1 ed.). Doğan Kitap. p. 331. ISBN 975-293-354-8.
5. Yeğinobalı, Nihal (24 February 2005) [2005]. Belki DefneDoğan Kitap (1 ed.). p. 299. ISBN 975-293-302-5.
6. Yeğinobalı, Nihal (23 April 2007) [2007]. Gazel (1 ed.). Can Yayınları. p. 296. ISBN 978-975-070-758-2.
7. Yeğinobalı, Nihal (14 May 2015). Kapı Komşumuz Nasreddin Hoca (1 ed.). İmge Kitabevi Yayınları. p. 64. ISBN 978-975-533-736-4.

Memoirs

- Yeğinobalı, Nihal (20 February 2014) [2005]. Cumhuriyet Çocuğu (10 ed.). Can Yayınları. p. 253. ISBN 978-975-510-996-1.

== Translations ==
Some of her translations are:

1. Bernard Malamud (1 March 1971). Kiev'deki Adam. Translated by Yeğinobalı, Nihal (1 ed.). Yeni Zamanlar Sahaf. p. 399.
2. A. J. Cronin (1 January 1997). Kabus Şatosu. Translated by Yeğinobalı, Nihal (1 ed.). Yeni Zamanlar Sahaf. p. 418.
3. Florence L. Barclay (1 September 1969). Ayrılık Şarkısı. Translated by Yeğinobalı, Nihal (1 ed.). Yeni Zamanlar Sahaf. p. 399.
4. D. H. Lawrence (30 October 1997). Aşık Kadınlar. Translated by Yeğinobalı, Nihal (2 ed.). Engin Yayıncılık. p. 469. ISBN 975-379-039-2.
5. William M. Thackeray (2006). Gurur Dünyası. Translated by Yeğinobalı, Nihal (1 ed.). İmge Kitabevi. ISBN 978-975-533-481-3.
6. James J. Morier (1 August 2006). İsfahan'dan İstanbul'a Hacı Baba'nın Maceraları İsfahan'dan İstanbul'a Hacı Baba'nın Maceraları. Translated by Yeğinobalı, Nihal (1 ed.). İmge Kitabevi Yayınları. p. 505. ISBN 975--533-489-0.
7. Oscar Wilde (3 August 2007). Şu Bizim Hortlak. Translated by Yeğinobalı, Nihal (1 ed.). İmge Kitabevi Yayınları. p. 87. ISBN 978-975-533-545-2.
8. Lewis Carroll (21 October 2008). Alis Aynanın İçinde Neler Gördü?. Translated by Yeğinobalı, Nihal (1 ed.). İmge Kitabevi Yayınları. p. 81. ISBN 978-975-533-583-4.
9. James Hilton (6 April 2010). Yitik Ufuklar. Translated by Yeğinobalı, Nihal (1 ed.). p. 208. ISBN 978-975-071-149-7.
10. J. M. Barrie (26 October 2010). Peter Pan İle Wendy. Translated by Yeğinobalı, Nihal (5 ed.). Can Çocuk Yayınları. p. 191. ISBN 978-975-070-339-3.
11. Brothers Grimm (9 November 2010). Grimm Masalları. Vol. 2. Translated by Yeğinobalı, Nihal (2 ed.). Can Çocuk Yayınları. p. 320. ISBN 978-975-071-243-2.
12. Jane Austen (30 December 2010). Kül ve Ateş. Translated by Yeğinobalı, Nihal (4 ed.). İmge Kitabevi Yayınları. p. 426. ISBN 978-975-533-512-4.
13. Carlo Collodi (13 January 2011). Pinokyo. Translated by Yeğinobalı, Nihal (1 ed.). İmge Kitabevi Yayınları. p. 190. ISBN 978-975-533-657-2.
14. Ivan Turgenev (1 January 2013). Babalar ve Oğullar. Translated by Yeğinobalı, Nihal (1 ed.). İmge Kitabevi Yayınları. p. 198. ISBN 978-975-533-725-8.
15. Carlos Fuentes (16 August 2013). Koca Gringo. Translated by Yeğinobalı, Nihal (2 ed.). Can Yayınları. p. 236. ISBN 978-975-070-379-9.
16. Iris Murdoch (26 March 2014). Melekler Zamanı. Translated by Yeğinobalı, Nihal (2 ed.). Ayrıntı Yayınları. p. 288. ISBN 978-975-539-104-5.
17. Julio Cortázar (17 April 2015). Cinayeti Gördüm. Translated by Yeğinobalı, Nihal (4 ed.). Can Yayınları. p. 84. ISBN 978-975-070-795-7.
18. Katherine Mansfield (13 November 2015). Bahtiyarlık ve Diğer Öyküler. Translated by Yeğinobalı, Nihal (2 ed.). Can Yayınları. p. 256. ISBN 978-975-072-613-2.
19. L. Frank Baum (25 February 2016). Oz Büyücüsü / Zümrüt Kent. Translated by Yeğinobalı, Nihal (2 ed.). İmge Kitabevi Yayınları. p. 175. ISBN 978-975-533-549-0.
20. Lewis Carroll (31 May 2016). Alis Harikalar Diyarında. Translated by Yeğinobalı, Nihal (2 ed.). İmge Kitabevi Yayınları. p. 156. ISBN 978-975-533-563-6.
21. Eduardo Galeano (22 March 2017). Kucaklaşmanın Kitabı. Translated by Yeğinobalı, Nihal (5 ed.). Can Yayınları. p. 290. ISBN 978-975-510-422-5.
22. Charles Dickens (14 June 2017). Oliver Twist. Translated by Yeğinobalı, Nihal (1 ed.). Can Yayınları. p. 1008. ISBN 978-975-073-479-3.
23. Laurence Sterne (14 July 2017). Duygusal Bir Yolculuk. Translated by Yeğinobalı, Nihal (1 ed.). Can Yayınları. p. 168. ISBN 978-975-072-594-4.
24. Jane Austen (16 October 2017). Mansfield Parkı. Translated by Yeğinobalı, Nihal (6 ed.). Can Yayınları. p. 488. ISBN 978-975-070-936-4.
25. Daniel Defoe (26 January 2018). Moll Flanders. Translated by Yeğinobalı, Nihal (2 ed.). Can Yayınları. p. 208. ISBN 978-975-071-325-5.
26. John Steinbeck (19 March 2018). Cennet Çayırı. Translated by Yeğinobalı, Nihal (2 ed.). Sel Yayıncılık. p. 216. ISBN 978-975-570-784-6.
27. Charles Dickens (7 May 2018). Büyük Umutlar. Translated by Yeğinobalı, Nihal (15 ed.). Can Yayınları. p. 656. ISBN 978-975-070-057-6.
28. Charlotte Brontë (17 May 2018). Jane Eyre. Translated by Yeğinobalı, Nihal (10 ed.). Can Yayınları. p. 632. ISBN 978-975-070-826-8.
29. Oscar Wilde (28 June 2018). Nar Evi. Translated by Yeğinobalı, Nihal (10 ed.). Can Çocuk Yayınları. p. 140. ISBN 978-975-071-169-5.
30. Manuel Puig (9 November 2018). Örümcek Kadının Öpücüğü. Translated by Yeğinobalı, Nihal (5 ed.). Can Yayınları. p. 282. ISBN 978-975-510-218-4.
31. Muriel Spark (25 December 2018). Sürücü Koltuğu. Translated by Yeğinobalı, Nihal (1 ed.). Siren Yayınları. p. 96. ISBN 978-605-590-375-6.
32. Oscar Wilde (28 March 2019). Mutlu Prens. Translated by Yeğinobalı, Nihal (23 ed.). Can Çocuk Yayınları. p. 80. ISBN 978-975-071-170-1.
33. Patricia Highsmith (28 March 2019). Kadın Düşmanlığı Üstüne Küçük, Öyküler. Translated by Yeğinobalı, Nihal (2 ed.). Can Yayınları. p. 112. ISBN 978-975-073-909-5.
34. Thomas Hardy (9 May 2019). Çılgın Kalabalıktan Uzak. Vol. 3. Translated by Yeğinobalı, Nihal. Can Yayınları. p. 496. ISBN 978-975-073-828-9.
35. Isabel Allende (20 September 2019). Ruhlar Evi. Translated by Yeğinobalı, Nihal (11 ed.). Can Yayınları. p. 432. ISBN 978-975-510-216-0.
36. Charles Dickens (3 September 2019). Noel Şarkısı. Translated by Yeğinobalı, Nihal (20 ed.). Can Çocuk Yayınları. p. 125. ISBN 978-975-070-260-0.
37. Jane Austen (3 September 2019). Emma. Translated by Yeğinobalı, Nihal (18 ed.). Can Yayınları. p. 480. ISBN 978-975-073-918-7.
38. Oscar Wilde (3 September 2019). Dorian Gray'in Portresi. Translated by Yeğinobalı, Nihal (38 ed.). Can Yayınları. p. 280. ISBN 978-975-073-917-0.
39. Theodore Dreiser (8 October 2019). İnsanlık Suçu 1. Translated by Yeğinobalı, Nihal (1 ed.). Ayrıksı Kitap. p. 208. ISBN 978-605-807-274-9.
40. Jane Austen (16 October 2019). Aşk ve Gurur. Translated by Yeğinobalı, Nihal (27 ed.). Can Yayınları. p. 456. ISBN 978-975-073-990-3.
41. Theodore Dreiser (16 December 2019). İnsanlık Suçu 2. Translated by Yeğinobalı, Nihal (1 ed.). Ayrıksı Kitap. p. 512. ISBN 978-605-807-277-0.
