= Northanger Abbey (1987 film) =

1987 television film directed by Giles Foster

- Katharine Schlesinger & Peter Firth
- Genre: Costume drama
- Based on: Northanger Abbey by Jane Austen
- Screenplay by: Maggie Wadey
- Directed by: Giles Foster
- Starring: Katharine Schlesinger; Peter Firth; Robert Hardy; Googie Withers
- Theme music composer: Ilona Sekacz
- Country of origin: United Kingdom
- Original language: English
- No. of episodes: 1

Production
- Producer: Louis Marks
- Cinematography: Nat Crosby Make-up,Hair & Prosthetics Designer Joan Stribling
- Running time: 88 minutes

Original release
- Network: BBC
- Release: 15 February 1987

Northanger Abbey is a 1987 made-for-television film adaptation of Jane Austen's 1817 novel Northanger Abbey, and was originally broadcast on the A&E Network and the BBC on 15 February 1987. It is part of the Screen Two anthology series.

== Plot ==
The film is set in the late 18th century when Jane Austen wrote the novel, although it was published after her death in 1817. Northanger Abbey is the story of Catherine Morland, who is invited to Bath, Somerset, with family friends, the Allens; they hope that the waters at Bath will help Mr. Allen's gout. Catherine (called "Cathy" by her many younger siblings) is a 17-year-old young lady who has been sheltered all her life, but escapes in her imagination by reading Gothic novels. She is delighted to go to Bath. Mrs. Allen introduces Catherine to the Thorpe family, including the eldest daughter, Isabella, who befriends Catherine. The girls have bonded over their love of similar novels when their brothers arrive. James (Catherine's brother) falls in love with Isabella, who is a hardened flirt. Likewise, John (Isabella's brother and James's friend) pursues Catherine, who does not like John nearly as much as John likes himself.

Catherine is falling in love with 26-year-old clergyman Henry Tilney, whom she met at a dance soon after her arrival in Bath. She befriends Henry's sister, Eleanor, and goes on outings with them, after their brother Frederick Tilney comes to Bath, together with their father General Tilney. Isabella, having learned that James (to whom she is now engaged) is poor, begins to flirt with Frederick and ultimately ends her engagement with James. Eleanor invites Catherine to stay with her at the Tilneys' home, Northanger Abbey.

Catherine accepts the invitation with pleasure, although she imagines that the Abbey will be rather like one of the gloomy castles in her books. General Tilney has been bragged to by John Thorpe that Catherine (whom John thinks is in love with him) is an heiress. When the General realises that Catherine's family is far from rich, however, he sends her packing from the Abbey at night. Once back at home, Catherine is unhappy, missing Henry and disillusioned about Gothic novels. Henry appears and proposes however, and the story ends happily.

== Cast ==
- Katharine Schlesinger as Catherine Morland
- Peter Firth as Henry Tilney
- Robert Hardy as General Tilney
- Googie Withers as Mrs. Allen
- Geoffrey Chater as Mr. Allen
- Cassie Stuart as Isabella Thorpe
- Jonathan Coy as John Thorpe
- Ingrid Lacey as Eleanor Tilney
- Greg Hicks as Frederick Tilney
- Philip Bird as James Morland
- Elvi Hale as Mrs. Thorpe
- Helen Fraser as Mrs. Morland
- David Rolfe as Mr. Morland
- Elaine Ives-Cameron as Marchioness
- Angela Curran as Alice
- Tricia Morrish as Miss Digby
- Oliver Hembrough as Edward Morland
- Anne-Marie Mullane as Thorpe Sisters
- Michelle Arthur as Thorpe Sisters
- Sarah-Jane Holm as Jenny
- Raphael Alleyne as page boy
