= All Roads Lead to Austen =

2012 non-fiction book

- Front cover
- Author: Amy Elizabeth Smith
- Subject: Jane Austen
- Publisher: Sourcebooks
- Publication date: June 1, 2012
- Pages: 352
- ISBN: 9781402265853

All Roads Lead to Austen: A Yearlong Journey with Jane is a 2012 book by the American author Amy Elizabeth Smith in which she explores the reception to Jane Austen's literature in Latin America.

== Synopsis ==
In 2011, academic Amy Elizabeth Smith takes a year on sabbatical from her role in the Writing and Literature department of the University of the Pacific. Though her Spanish language knowledge is limited, she visits six countries in Latin America to hold book club discussions on three books by Jane Austen: Sense and Sensibility (1811), Pride and Prejudice (1813) and Emma (1816). She is interested in whether the themes and characters are relatable to people from a different culture.

The countries visited are Argentina, Chile, Ecuador, Guatemala, Paraguay and Mexico. Smith finds that almost all readers are able to relate to the themes of gender, class and family values in Austen's work. The book also follows her romantic experiences, activities while traveling and illness with dengue fever during the year. She reflects on the topic of race as it relates to Austen, and her preconceived notions about the places she visits.

== Background ==
Smith was inspired by Reading Lolita in Tehran (2003), a book by an Iranian–American academic about her experiences in Iran from the 1970s to the 1990s, with a focus on her book club on Western literature. Smith described the book as "a beautiful memoir about why reading is so important in people's lives, and how sharing literature brings us together". In her sabbatical year, she was most surprised by Emma's inability to impress in Paraguay. Smith recommended Pride and Prejudice to a beginner, but most enjoyed Northanger Abbey (1817).

== Reception ==
The book made The New York Times's list of Top 75 Best-Selling Education Books of 2013, appearing in last place.

Kirkus Reviews said that Smith was an "engaging narrator", able to convey "the lively, often heated" book discussions and the "unique characteristics" of each place she visits, but criticized that "the reading-group discussions tend to blur together". Publishers Weekly reviewed the book as "humorous", and recommended it to "fans of literature and travel". Mary Ellen Quinn, in Booklist, praised Smith's "breezy style" and the "fun twist" on studies of Austen. Neal Wyatt of Library Journal praised the book as "fascinating", while Bustle's Karen Green found it "charming and irresistible".
