= Regency Love =

2013 video game

- Developer: Tea for Three Studios
- Publisher: Tea For Three Studios
- Platform: iOS
- Release: WW: December 2013
- Genres: Interactive novel, Visual novel

Regency Love is an iOS game from Australian indie studio Tea for Three Studios set in Regency-era England. This interactive/visual novel-style game puts the player in the shoes of a young woman of marrying age, who must improve her talents, such as reading and needlepoint, in her search for an eligible bachelor to marry her. Regency Love was originally released in December 2013 in the Apple Store. In May 2015, Tea for Three released a downloadable content pack, with an additional suitor and more backstories for characters, as well as bug fixes.

== Plot ==
Regency Love is set in the small, fictional English town of Darlington. The game begins with the protagonist, a young woman of marrying age, going into town on an errand for her mother. In the first chapter, the player discovers the protagonist's father died a year ago. In the next chapter, the father's longtime friend, Mr. Worthington, returns from Europe to advise the main character to practice her accomplishments and focus on finding a husband. From there, the main character finds herself encountering several mysterious new bachelors: Mr. Ashcroft, Mr. Curtis, and Mr. Graham. The player has the option to pursue any or all of these men, as well as follow town gossip, play matchmaker, make friends with newcomers, and investigate local mysteries.

== Inspiration ==
Regency Love was inspired by the novels of Jane Austen, as well as the mechanics of games like Dragon Age: Origins and Baldur's Gate 2, according to game writer Samantha Lin. Lin, along with Jenny Tan and Melody Wang, also of Tea for Three, wanted to create a game that allowed players to interact with RPGs and influence the plot based on dialog choices.
