= Eleanor Holmes Hinkley =

American playwright

- Born: June 5, 1891; Boston, Massachusetts, U.S.
- Died: January 24, 1971 (aged 79); Cambridge, Massachusetts, U.S.
- Occupation: Playwright
- Notable work: Dear Jane (1919)
- Relatives: T. S. Eliot (first cousin); Charlotte Champe Eliot (aunt)

Eleanor Holmes Hinkley (June 5, 1891 – January 24, 1971) was an American playwright and actress, based in Boston. She is perhaps best known as the author of Dear Jane (1919), an early dramatic work based on the life of Jane Austen.

== Early life and education ==
Hinkley was born in Boston, the daughter of Holmes Hinkley and Susan Heywood Stearns. Her father died the year she was born; her mother was an active suffragist, as an officer of women's suffrage organizations in Cambridge and Massachusetts. Writer T. S. Eliot was Hinkley's first cousin; their mothers were sisters. She attended Radcliffe College, where she studied theatre under Harvard's George Pierce Baker.

== Plays ==
Hinkley's Dear Jane (1919) is a play about Jane Austen and her sister, artist Cassandra Austen. It was produced in Boston in 1922, with fellow Radcliffe alumna Virginia Tanner Green directing, and on Broadway in 1932 with Eva Le Gallienne directing and starring as Cassandra, with Josephine Hutchinson as Jane.

- The Reunion (1917)
- Taking in Bettina (1917, 1-act farce)
- A Gentleman Friend (1917)
- The Clam Digger (1919, a "stark tragedy")
- Dear Jane (1919)
- The Guest (1919, a 1-act play)
- The Flitch of Bacon (1921, a 1-act comedy)
- What's the Matter with Lily (1923, comedy)
- High Tide (1924)
- White Violets (1930)
- Mrs. Aphra Behn (1933, also known as American Mistress)

== Personal life ==
Hinkley died in 1971, at the age of 79, at her home in Cambridge. One of her nephews was a prominent scholar of Chinese Buddhism, Holmes Hinkley Welch.
