= Henry Tilney =

- Northanger Abbey character

In-universe information
- Gender: Male
- Occupation: Clergyman
- Family: General Tilney
- Spouse: Catherine Morland
- Relatives: Miss Eleanor Tilney (younger sister); Captain Frederick Tilney (older brother)
- Home: Northanger Abbey/Woodston Parsonage

Henry Tilney is the leading man in Jane Austen's 1817 novel Northanger Abbey. The younger son of a local landowner, Tilney is comfortably placed as a beneficed clergyman on his father's estate.

== Character ==
Tilney, with his teasing yet kind-hearted mentorship of Catherine, has been considered the nicest of Austen's heroes. At the same time, with his knowledge of muslin and of Gothic novels, he is the least "masculine" of them. Overshadowed by his military father and elder brother, he is a strangely passive figure, falling for Catherine only after she falls for him, and with his father as the driving force behind her coming to the Abbey. Nevertheless, he does not lack moral courage, as he shows with his marriage to Catherine at the book's close.

== Origins ==
Frank Swinnerton considered that, as a teasing mentor, knowledgeable on female matters, Tilney might represent a disguised version of the author herself. Later critics, more cautiously, have seen him as representing in part the author's "voice".

Sydney Smith, who is known to have overlapped with Austen in Bath at the close of the eighteenth century, and whose witty conversation resembles Tilney's, has also been seen as a possible model for the character. So too has Austen's witty brother Henry: “affectionate & kind as well as entertaining....he cannot help being amusing”.

== See also ==
- Father complex
- Hugh Blair
- Silver fork novel
- William Sawrey Gilpin
