= Catherine Morland =

Heroine of Jane Austen novel Northanger Abbey

- Northanger Abbey character
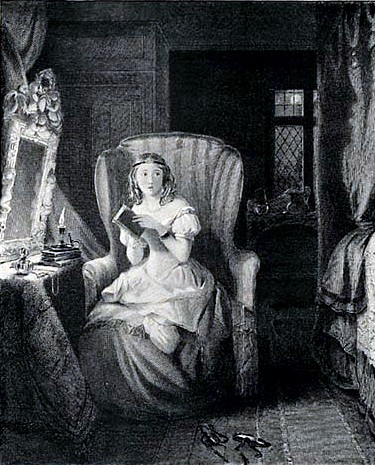
- Catherine frightening herself with “Mysteries of Udolpho”

In-universe information
- Gender: Female
- Family: Richard Morland; Mrs Morland
- Spouse: Henry Tilney
- Relatives: James Morland (brother); Sarah "Sally" Morland (sister); George Morland (brother); Harriet Morland (sister); 2 elder brothers 3 younger siblings
- Home: Northanger Abbey/Woodston Parsonage

Catherine Morland is the heroine of Jane Austen's 1817 novel Northanger Abbey. A modest, kind-hearted ingénue, she is led by her reading of Gothic literature to misinterpret much of the social world she encounters.

== Character ==
Catherine is barely out of the schoolroom when she enters the social whirl of Bath society, and the novel centres around her attempts, often laughable, to learn about life and social realities. Many of her problems stem from her tendency to take people at their own evaluation; However, while socially naive, Catherine also has an underlying sense of reality to support her; and her honesty and strength eventually see her successfully through her troubles.

Her confrontation at Northanger Abbey itself with the novel's main father figure, General Tilney, brings matters to a head. Unable to see through his manipulations over her postulated inheritance, or to recognise him beneath his fine words as a domestic tyrant, Catherine turns to Gothic fantasy to explain her sense of unease, only to be embarrassed and humiliated when her imaginings of a gruesome murder are laid bare as false. Arguably, however, she has been both wrong and right in her preconscious judgement of the General, using her Gothic imaginings to articulate the gap between her experience of the General and his social facade.

== See also ==
- Ann Radcliffe
- Arabella
- Henry Tilney
