= Fiona Finlay =

Fiona Finlay may refer to:

- Fiona Finlay, pseudonym used by Vivian Stuart (1914–1986), British writer
- Fiona Finlay (producer) (born 1956), British film and television producer
