= Marriage in the works of Jane Austen =

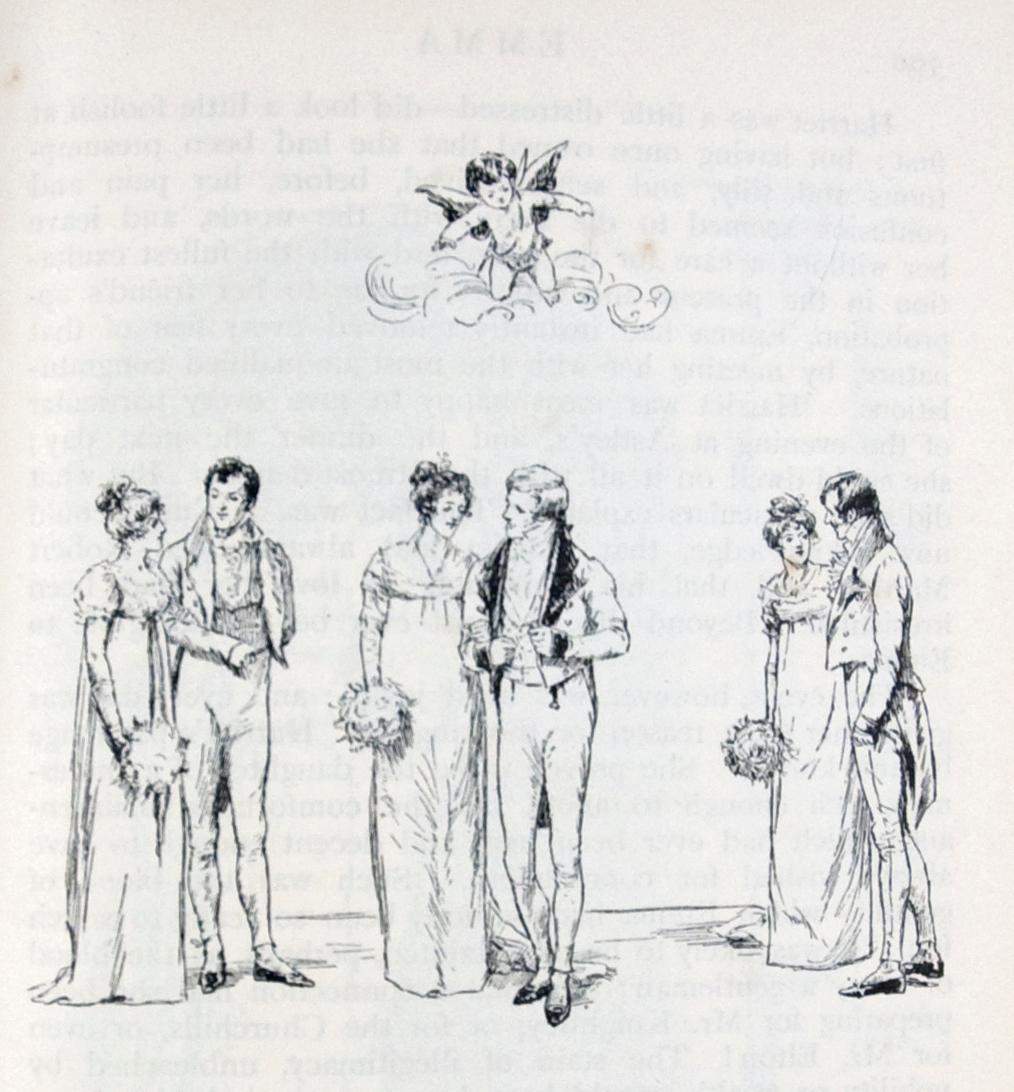
The novel Emma entered into three marriages: Jane Fairfax and Frank Churchill, Emma Woodhouse and Mr Knightley, Harriet Smith and Robert Martin (Chris Hammond, 1898).

Marriage is a key theme in Jane Austen’s novels, especially Pride and Prejudice. Austen examines marriages of convenience, common in her time, and often critiques those based on financial considerations. Her main characters typically end up in marriages based on mutual affection, where love is balanced with practical concerns like social standing and financial stability.

Austen’s work reflects the realities of her time, where women were often dependent on male authority and financial security. In a socially rigid society, a good marriage was essential for a woman’s social standing and financial well-being. Young women were encouraged to marry well, carefully considering both love and the financial stability of their suitors.

While not directly criticizing the situation, Austen presents her view of a “good” marriage through her characters, offering a perspective on the different types of unions available to women. She suggests that marriages based solely on passion, or solely on convenience, are often unsatisfactory. She also challenges common romantic ideas, like of love at first sight or the notion that one cannot love more than once.

In the end, Austen’s heroines often find ideal marriages based on mutual respect and understanding, with partners who share both emotional and intellectual connections; with due regard to, but not determined by, social or financial status.

Austen's novels deal exclusively with marriages contracted within a specific social circle, that of the country gentry of rural England; which was also that of her own family, her father George Austen being a clergyman with two beneficed rectories in Hampshire, and eight children – six sons and two daughters (neither of whom married). The sons variously became clergymen, bankers, naval officers, and country landowners. Within these social circles, the English gentry over the 18th century had developed a range of strategies for marriage, that would ideally maintain landed estates within the family name, while also responding to the increasing understanding of marriage as predominantly a matter determined by personal choice between two individuals, rather than – as previously – as an alliance of interests between families. These strategies became embodied in the legal instruments of entail and strict succession that underpinned inheritance of landed estates at this period; and which, crucially, assured heirs to landed estates in early adulthood, of access to an income that would allow them to marry without having to wait for their fathers to die first. In Austen's novels, marriage of major characters – whether of romantic affection or convenience – is always a choice of two individuals.

== The social importance of marriage for women ==
“Single women have a dreadful propensity for being poor, which is one very strong argument in favor of matrimony.”

=== The devaluation of unmarried women ===
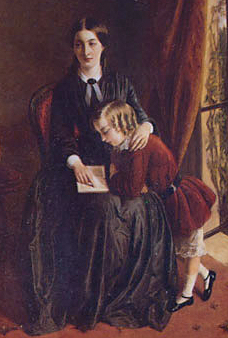
Being a governess is the only honorable job for a poor, well-educated young woman.

In all her novels, Jane Austen highlights the choice faced by women of the small gentry: marry or remain dependent on their family. Marriage was often the primary way for women to gain independence, as under English law, unmarried women were legally under the control of their fathers or other male relatives. However, in an era where the number of women exceeded that of men, finding an acceptable suitor, (Note: In Jane Austen's time, 25% of gentry girls remained unmarried, and rarely by choice.) could become a significant concern.

A woman's value was often judged by her “marriageability,” and remaining single was generally seen as undesirable, especially for women without brothers or fathers to support them. In Pride and Prejudice, the narrator mentions Charlotte Lucas's brothers being relieved at the thought that they would no longer need to support her financially if she remained unmarried. For many women of the gentry, marriage was essential to secure financial stability. (Note: The financial problem obviously does not arise for those who have a personal fortune, like Emma Woodhouse ("beautiful, intelligent, and rich"), or Georgiana Darcy (£30,000 dowry).)

Unmarried women, especially widows, faced a challenging reality. Upon the death of their father, their resources were limited. They might find work as a governess or teacher if qualified, but these roles were often seen as subordinate and difficult. Other options, like being a lady’s companion or managing a brother's household, could come with challenges, including mistreatment or lack of respect. The lack of financial resources and the limited number of potential suitors often made it difficult for women to find a husband. (Note: That is to say, from the same social background. Thus the Austen family is linked to about ten close families, such as the Digweeds of Steventon, the Biggs of Manydown or the Lefroys of Ashe.)

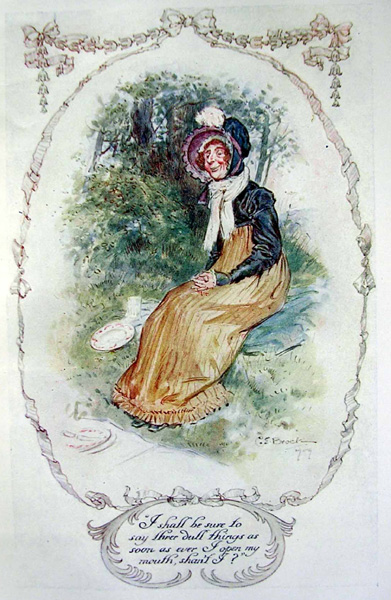
"A poor old maid like Miss Bates runs the risk of being ridiculous and unpleasant" (C.E. Brock, 1909).

The social status of women was closely linked to marriage. When women gained the right to vote in parliamentary elections in 1918, there were proposals to exclude unmarried women, as they were seen as having failed to attract a mate. The status of unmarried women was often considered inferior to that of married women, as seen in Pride and Prejudice, where Lydia, newly married to Wickham, proudly claims the position of her older sister Jane. Similarly, in Persuasion, Mary Musgrove feels somewhat diminished when her unmarried sister Anne reclaims her seniority. (Note: ”She had something to suffer, perhaps, when they came into contact again, in seeing Anne restored to the rights of seniority.”)

Emma Woodhouse is the only Austen heroine who can consider remaining single without concern for her social status. She is wealthy, independent, and well-regarded in her community. With the freedom to manage her household as she pleases, Emma does not feel the need to marry. She believes that while poor spinsters might be looked down upon, a wealthy one like herself would always be respected. However, it is the vanity of Mrs. Elton, a married woman who takes precedence over Emma, that makes her briefly reconsider marriage.

In Austen’s novels, marriage and financial security are often intertwined. For women without personal wealth, marrying a man with means was essential. (Note: The problem is exactly the same for younger sons, who are financially penalized by the strictness of birthright but want to maintain their rank, like Colonel Fitzwilliam, who, at over 30, is single: "Younger sons cannot marry where they like," he tells Elizabeth Bennet. He thus makes it clear to her that he likes her enormously, but that she is too poor for him to consider marrying her.) Austen portrays her heroines’ emotional journeys toward resolving this issue, while also showing the realities of married life through secondary characters.

=== Marriage: A source of financial security ===
Marrying for financial security was a socially accepted norm, despite criticism from some writers like Mary Wollstonecraft, in A Vindication of the Rights of Woman (1792), and Jane West, in Letters to a Young Lady (1801), likened it to a form of "legalized prostitution." In Pride and Prejudice, Elizabeth Bennet is shocked by her friend Charlotte Lucas's pragmatic approach to marriage, especially her decision to marry the foolish Mr. Collins. Mrs. Bennet, on the other hand, is focused on the financial benefits of marriage for her daughters, viewing it through a material lens, much like her marriage to Mr. Bennet, which she likely saw in terms of financial stability.

For many people, a "good" marriage was primarily seen as one that offered financial advantages. In Sense and Sensibility, Willoughby is interested in Miss Grey’s wealth to maintain his lavish lifestyle. In Mansfield Park, Maria Bertram is attracted to John Rushworth for his wealth. Similarly, in Northanger Abbey, General Tilney encourages his son Henry to court Catherine Morland, believing she is wealthy.

Marriage also played a key role in strengthening the social and financial position of families. For example, Lady Catherine de Bourgh wants to marry her daughter to her nephew Darcy to consolidate both families’ power and to protect her own precarious financial position. Miss Bingley hopes her brother will marry Georgiana Darcy, aiming to improve the Bingleys' social standing. John Dashwood, in Sense and Sensibility, expresses disappointment when his half-sister Elinor marries Edward Ferrars instead of Colonel Brandon, to whose wealth and estate he had hoped to gain access.

In Mansfield Park, Sir Thomas Bertram sends his niece Fanny to Portsmouth, hoping that being away from the comforts of Mansfield Park will make her more appreciative of Henry Crawford’s proposal, which he sees as a good match due to Crawford’s secure income.

The financial expectations for marriage vary among characters. In Sense and Sensibility, Marianne Dashwood and Elinor Dashwood discuss their different views on what constitutes a suitable income for marriage. Marianne considers £1,800 to £2,000 annually as the minimum, while Elinor feels that £1,000 would be enough. Their marriages reflect these expectations: Elinor marries Edward Ferrars and lives modestly, while Marianne marries Colonel Brandon and benefits from a larger income.

Lydia Bennet, on the other hand, is focused only on her romantic desires and does not consider the financial practicality of her marriage. In contrast, the other women ensure that their marriages will provide a comfortable standard of living.

=== Marriage as a means of securing social status ===
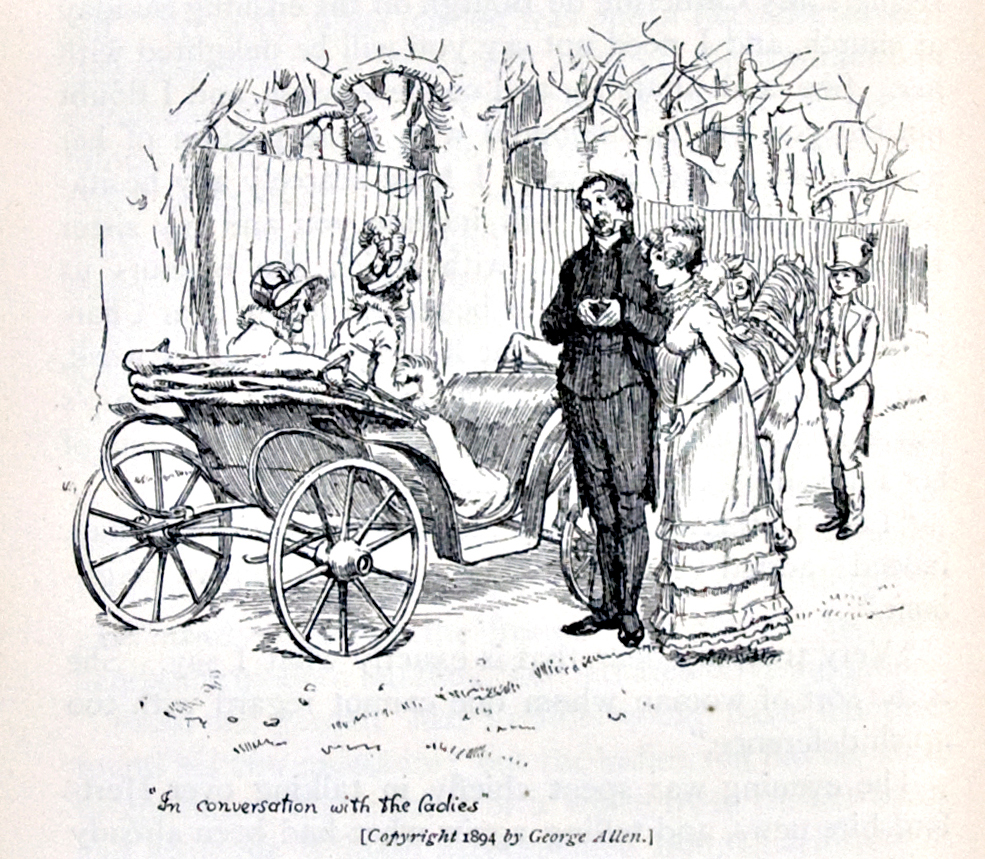
Charlotte Lucas deftly gauged her husband's social situation in the shadow of Rosings Park (Hugh Thomson, 1894).

In England at the time, a woman's social status was determined by her father before marriage and by her husband afterward.

This is evident in Mansfield Park, where Fanny Price, raised as a poor cousin by her wealthy uncle, is constantly reminded that she is not part of the Bertram family. It is only after the moral decline of Sir Thomas's daughters that he begins to appreciate Fanny and approves of her marriage to his son, Edmund. He had previously supported his eldest daughter’s choice to marry a wealthy but foolish man, seeing the match as a way to improve the family's position.

In Emma, Frank Churchill's marriage to Jane Fairfax does not break social norms, but Harriet Smith, an illegitimate girl, gains respectability by marrying Robert Martin, a farmer.

In Pride and Prejudice, Charlotte Lucas views marriage as a way to improve social standing. She accepts Mr. Collins's proposal, weighing his income and connections as important factors. (Note: They are not specified by the narrator, however. She only mentions a "good house, very sufficient income.") Her pragmatic approach is criticized by Elizabeth but understood by Jane, who recognizes the security it offers Charlotte. (Note: ”Happiness in marriage is entirely a matter of chance […] and it is better to know as little as possible of the defects of the person with whom you are to pass your life.”)

While Jane Austen often uses irony in her portrayal of Charlotte, she does not overtly condemn her. The social dynamics of the time made securing a comfortable marriage an essential goal for unmarried women. For example, Miss Gardiner marries Mr. Bennet, a minor landowner, thus improving her social standing. Jane and Elizabeth Bennet continue this upward mobility by marrying wealthy men like Bingley and Darcy. Elizabeth, in particular, rises to a higher social position, but her status remains closely tied to her family's background as members of the landed gentry.

=== The weight of family ===
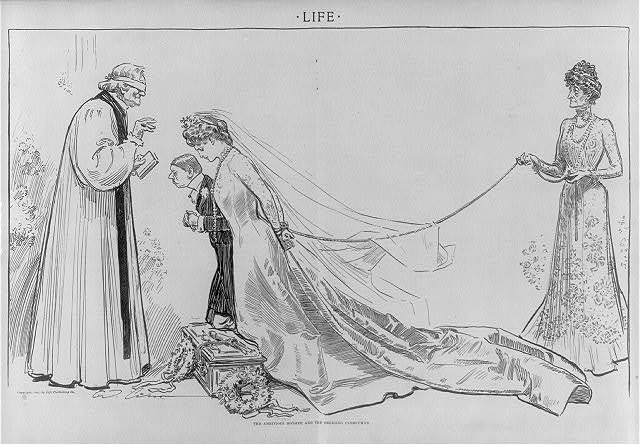
An ambitious mother may force her daughter into a forced marriage. Cartoon by Charles Dana Gibson (1902).

As Katrin Schmidt points out, "sons bring money to the family, while daughters only take it away," which is why families often have a say in marriage decisions. Marriages can be discouraged or blocked if they are seen as unadvantageous. Jane Austen experienced this personally when her acquaintance Tom Lefroy was sent away by his family because they could not allow him to marry a woman without a fortune. This theme appears throughout Austen's novels. In Sense and Sensibility, Mrs. Ferrars disinherits her son Edward for not marrying an heiress. In Pride and Prejudice, Lady Catherine de Bourgh tries to prevent her nephew from marrying Elizabeth Bennet, while Miss Bingley opposes her brother's marriage to Jane Bennet. In Northanger Abbey, General Tilney forbids his son from seeing Catherine Morland when he believes she is poor. In Persuasion, Lady Russell convinces Anne Elliot to break off her engagement to Frederick Wentworth, whose fortune is not yet secured.

This theme is also explored in secondary plotlines. In Pride and Prejudice, Darcy must act urgently to persuade his sister Georgiana against eloping with Wickham, because otherwise he could not keep him from controlling her settled dowry, and Miss King's guardian takes her to Liverpool to protect her from a fortune-seeker. In Emma, Frank Churchill hides his engagement to Jane Fairfax to avoid his aunt's disapproval. In Sense and Sensibility, John Dashwood expresses his disappointment with his brother-in-law Robert Ferrars for secretly marrying the penniless Lucy Steele, suggesting that had the family known, they would have tried to prevent the marriage. The obstacles to marriage in these cases are primarily financial rather than social, as the lovers usually belong to similar social classes.

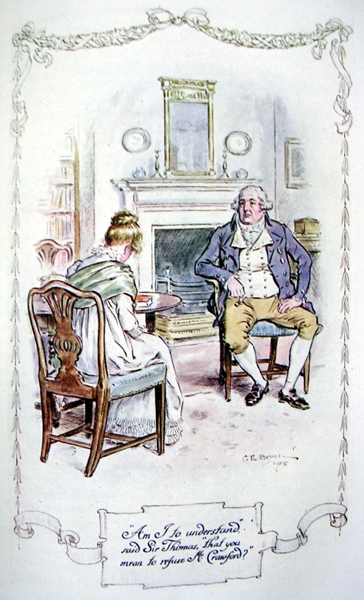
"'Am I to understand that you are considering refusing Mr. Crawford?' Sir Thomas asked in wonder, determined to overcome the resistance of his niece and ward, Fanny."

Sometimes, families might force marriages that benefit them, disregarding the feelings of the individuals involved. This is seen in Colonel Brandon's youth, where his cousin Eliza was pressured to marry his older brother. Jane Austen generally avoids such tragic situations, focusing instead on social comedy. For example, in Pride and Prejudice, Lydia Bennet’s marriage to Wickham, though forced for him, was desired by her and became necessary to protect the family’s reputation.

The power of families to influence marriages is often portrayed as a threat to the heroine’s happiness. Sir Thomas Bertram wants Fanny Price to marry the wealthy Henry Crawford; Lady Catherine de Bourgh and her sister had planned their children's marriage from an early age; and Mrs. Bennet sees no problem in Elizabeth marrying Mr. Collins. In Pride and Prejudice, Jane Bennet, the eldest daughter, might have sacrificed her happiness for the sake of her family's security if the heir to Longbourn had come before Mr. Bingley.

In families with multiple daughters, a financially secure marriage for one can help support her sisters and mother. This is especially important when there are no brothers and the estate passes to others. For example, Jane and Elizabeth Bennet help their younger sister Kitty improve her manners, and Mrs. Darcy contributes financially to assist the Wickhams. Darcy also helps his brother-in-law in his career for Elizabeth’s sake, and Georgiana benefits from living near Elizabeth. (Note: That is, by saving on the financial envelope allocated by his marriage contract for his personal expenses (pin money).)

Such family care is common in Austen’s novels, particularly among kind characters. Sir John Middleton welcomes Mrs. Dashwood and her daughters, renting them Barton Cottage for a low fee. Sir Thomas Bertram supports his Price nephews and hosts the eldest during his leave. The Musgroves assist their less affluent relatives, and after marrying Frank Churchill, Jane Fairfax helps her elderly relatives, Mrs. and Miss Bates.

== Examples not to follow ==
Jane Austen's novels focus on the transitional period in a young woman's life when she moves from her parents' home to that of her husband, as described in Fanny Burney's Evelina. Marriage at the time was seen as permanent, so finding the right partner was crucial for securing a stable position in society. However, if a woman sought happiness and wanted to preserve her moral integrity, she needed patience and courage, as Austen advised her niece, Fanny Knight, who was still single at twenty-five.

There were many potential pitfalls in choosing a partner, and it often required strong resolve to decline a financially secure marriage, especially when the woman knew her future could be uncertain if she didn't marry. This is the situation faced by the three Dashwood sisters in Sense and Sensibility, the five Bennet daughters in Pride and Prejudice, and the Elliot sisters in Persuasion.

=== “Imprudent” marriages ===
==== In the previous generation ====
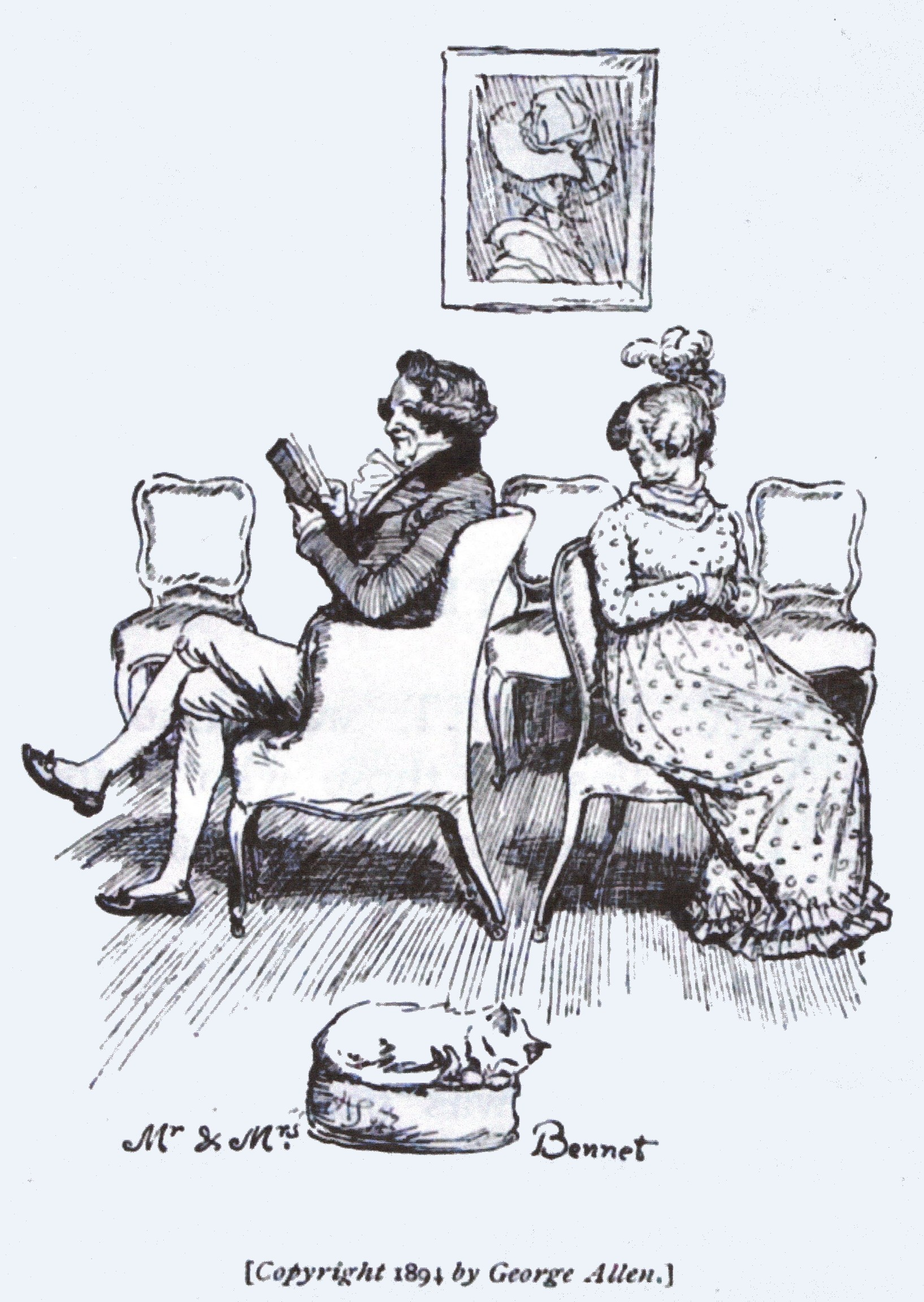
Mr and Mrs Bennet, after 20 years of marriage (Hugh Thomson, 1894).

Jane Austen often explores marriages based on first impressions, impulses, or youthful passion, showing how such unions can lead to dissatisfaction and difficulties for both the spouses and their children. For example, Mr. Bennet's attraction to Miss Gardiner, Frances Ward's impulsive marriage to Lieutenant Price, and Miss Churchill's marriage to Captain Weston all illustrate how unwise choices can affect the individuals involved. (Note: Jane Austen wrote in an 1800 letter to Cassandra about the marriage of the wealthy Miss Sawbridge to a poor tutor, Mr Maxwell, writing that she must have been head over heels in love to accept such a penniless suitor.)

==== Mr. and Mrs. Bennet ====
To highlight the components of a successful marriage, Austen contrasts them with poorly matched unions, such as the marriage of Mr. and Mrs. Bennet in Pride and Prejudice. Mr. Bennet is an intelligent man married to a frivolous wife obsessed with marrying off her daughters, driven by financial insecurity. Mrs. Bennet is delighted by her daughters’ marriages, regardless of the character of their husbands.

The children of such ill-matched marriages often suffer, as scholar Paula Bennett points out. Mr. Bennet is detached and mocks his family, while Mrs. Bennet’s behavior embarrasses her daughters. As Elizabeth observes, Jane’s disappointment is due in part to the actions of her parents. Their leniency also allows Lydia to act recklessly, nearly causing disaster. Mr. Bennet eventually acknowledges his role in Lydia's mistakes, while Mrs. Bennet blames others. It is through the intervention of Darcy and Mr. Gardiner that Lydia's honor is saved and the family avoids disgrace.

==== Lydia's marriage ====
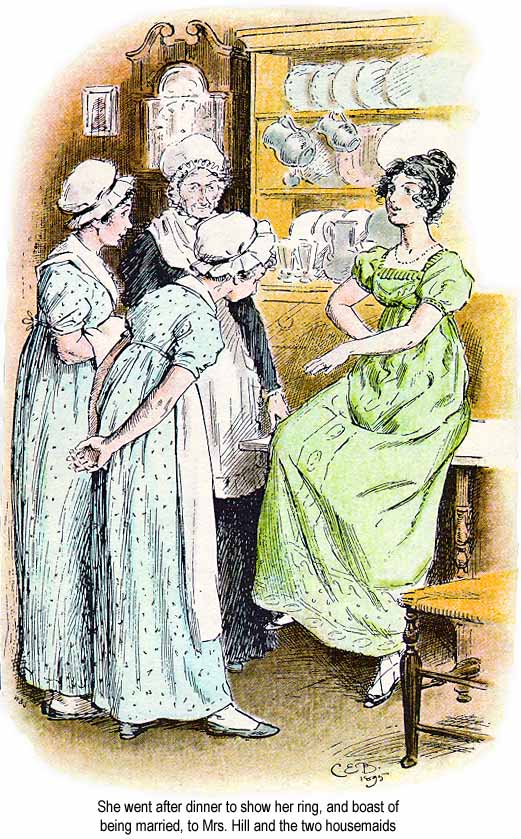
Lydia is proud to show that at 16 she already has the enviable status of a married woman (C. E. Brock, 1895).

Lydia Bennet's impulsive attraction to Wickham nearly brings disgrace to her family and could have led to her downfall if circumstances hadn't forced a marriage. Lydia is carefree and focused solely on enjoying herself, treating her elopement as a joke. She doesn't consider the consequences of her actions and views marriage as an achievement, regardless of her husband's character or financial situation. For Lydia, the status of being married is more important than any other factor.

Lydia's naïveté and flirtatious nature lead her into a relationship with Wickham, a man who takes advantage of her innocence. While she feels validated by the marriage, it is clear that Wickham is not genuinely committed to her, and over time, he will likely grow bored and seek other distractions. Lydia, whose behavior mirrors her mother's, may eventually face the same disillusionment and selfishness as her mother once did.

==== Other cases ====
When lack of money is added to an unsuitable marriage, problems often emerge quickly and happiness is short-lived. For example, in Mansfield Park, the Price family struggles with a modest income and poor living conditions. The father is coarse, the mother is overwhelmed, and the children are unruly. Fanny, upon returning home, faces the difficult reality of their situation. Only through the help of their wealthy uncle, Sir Thomas Bertram, do the children have any hope for a better future.

In Emma, Austen describes Mr. Weston's unhappy first marriage. His wife, who came from a wealthy family, loved him but could never let go of her sense of superiority. She pressured him to live beyond his means, leading to financial difficulties. After her death, Mr. Weston was left with financial ruin and had to send their son to live with his uncle to help recover his fortune.

=== Marriages of convenience ===
Marriages of convenience, arranged to satisfy family interests, remained the most common type during this period, not only among the aristocracy or heirs of estates. These are conventional marriages, as marriage is considered a duty, and traditional in the sense that spouses fulfill the roles expected of them by society. Such unions can be tolerable under certain conditions, with financial comfort being among the most important.

==== General cases ====
For some young women, the status of being honorably married is more important than the character of the man they marry. In Sense and Sensibility, Mrs. Jennings arranges socially acceptable marriages for her daughters, providing generous dowries for Mary, the eldest, and Charlotte, the youngest. However, the couples are mismatched, as Elinor Dashwood observes “the strange unsuitableness which often existed between husband and wife.” Sir John Middleton, a rural man with simple tastes, shares little in common with his elegant but overwhelmed wife, except a mutual enjoyment of hosting guests. Mr. Palmer, intelligent but somewhat snobbish, marries a young, pretty woman who tends to see everything in an overly positive light, which helps him cope with her lack of depth.

In Pride and Prejudice, Louisa Bingley’s dowry supports Mr. Hurst, a gentleman of little ambition, whose lifestyle revolves around eating, drinking, and playing cards. These couples, though mismatched, find a balance that allows their marriages to function, with the women generally avoiding conflict with their husbands.

In Persuasion, Charles and Mary Musgrove settle into a tolerable routine, appearing to be a happy couple. Charles is practical and good-natured, while Mary tends to complain and quarrel. Mary was Charles’s second choice; he had initially proposed to Anne Elliot. Jane Austen suggests that had Anne accepted, she would have greatly improved Charles’s social and intellectual position.

In Mansfield Park, Jane Austen portrays both reasonably happy marriages of convenience (like those of Sir Thomas and Lady Bertram, or the Grants) and less successful unions. Mary Crawford comments on the marriage of the Frasers, noting that it is “about as unhappy as most other married people’s.” (Note: It was, in her opinion, an "interesting" marriage for the twenty-five-year-old Janet Ross, "because he was rich and she had nothing." The much older husband, however, was "grumpy and demanding," in her opinion, but for Edmund Bertram Mrs Frazer was a cold-hearted, vain woman who had married him only for his money. ("Mansfield Park (Chap. 44)". pemberley.com.)) She also mentions her aunt, who was unhappy with her unfaithful husband and disliked the sea. This marriage serves as a negative example for the young Crawfords, whose values have been shaped by their environment. (Note: When Admiral Crawford, after the death of his wife, moves in with his mistress, Mary comes to live in Mansfield, with her sister, Mrs Grand, the pastor's wife.)

==== The Charlotte Lucas case ====
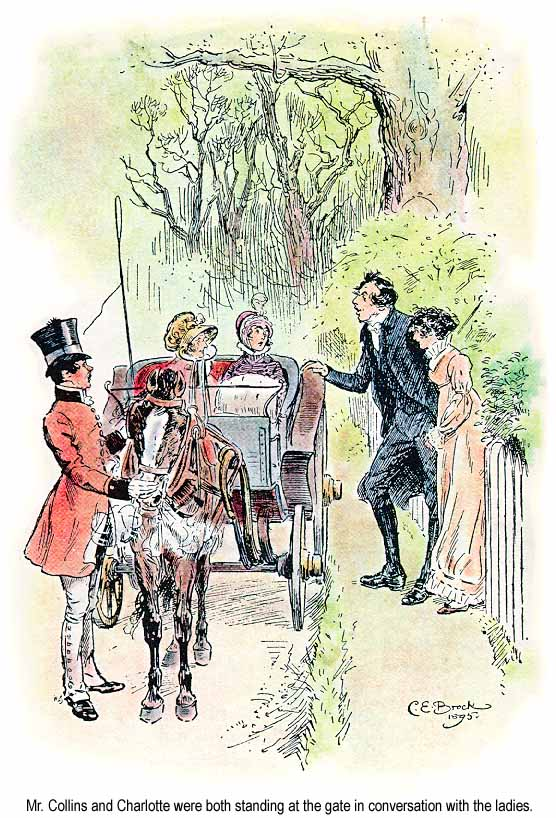
Being a minister's wife and living near Rosings Park was an interesting social promotion for Charlotte (C. E. Brock, 1895).

Marriage, in many ways, functions as a business arrangement where financial stability and social status take precedence. This is evident in the marriage of Charlotte Lucas and Mr. Collins, which can be seen as a "marriage of convenience." Charlotte marries him with a sense of practicality, recognizing that marriage is the only viable option for a well-educated but financially disadvantaged young woman. She strategically redirects Mr. Collins’ attention toward herself, relieving Elizabeth of an unwanted proposal. Charlotte enters the marriage with realistic expectations, while Mr. Collins marries out of a sense of duty, believing his new position entitles him to a wife. Though both parties are described as "amiable", Charlotte’s motivations are grounded in securing a stable home, while Mr. Collins imagines he is in love.

Charlotte's decision reflects a pragmatic choice many women faced—marriage as a means of social respectability. She openly admits to Elizabeth that she is not motivated by romance, and while the narrator acknowledges her desire to secure a stable life, it also comments on the limitations of her situation. Elizabeth, however, feels that Charlotte has sacrificed her personal values for practical gain. She resists the idea that selfishness could be justified as prudence and refuses to accept that Charlotte's choice was based on anything but self-interest. (Note: In Jane Austen the word principle usually means religious principle, recalls Austenette Worlds.)

From a different perspective, some critics argue that Charlotte’s decision was a sensible one given her circumstances. For someone in her position, securing a marriage was a practical means of gaining independence and security. While Elizabeth’s future is more uncertain, Charlotte’s position, though modest, ensures a stable life. Fanny Price, in contrast, faces even greater social challenges but refuses to accept a marriage for convenience.

At the margins of the novel, Austen hints at a future for Charlotte that includes a gradual rise in social status. Through her marriage to Mr. Collins, she secures a more comfortable position as a rectors wife, gaining a status similar to, though lower than Elizabeth’s; though should Mr Collins inherit the Longbourn estate, their status would be similar.

=== Marriages of convenience ===
The Austen family loved charades, and one attributed to Jane Austen touches on this theme:

You may lie on my first by the side of a stream,
And my second compose to the nymph you adore,
But if, when you've none of my whole, her esteem
And affection diminish — think of her no more! (Note: The answer is Bank and Note, hence Banknote.)

==== "Such things are so common" ====
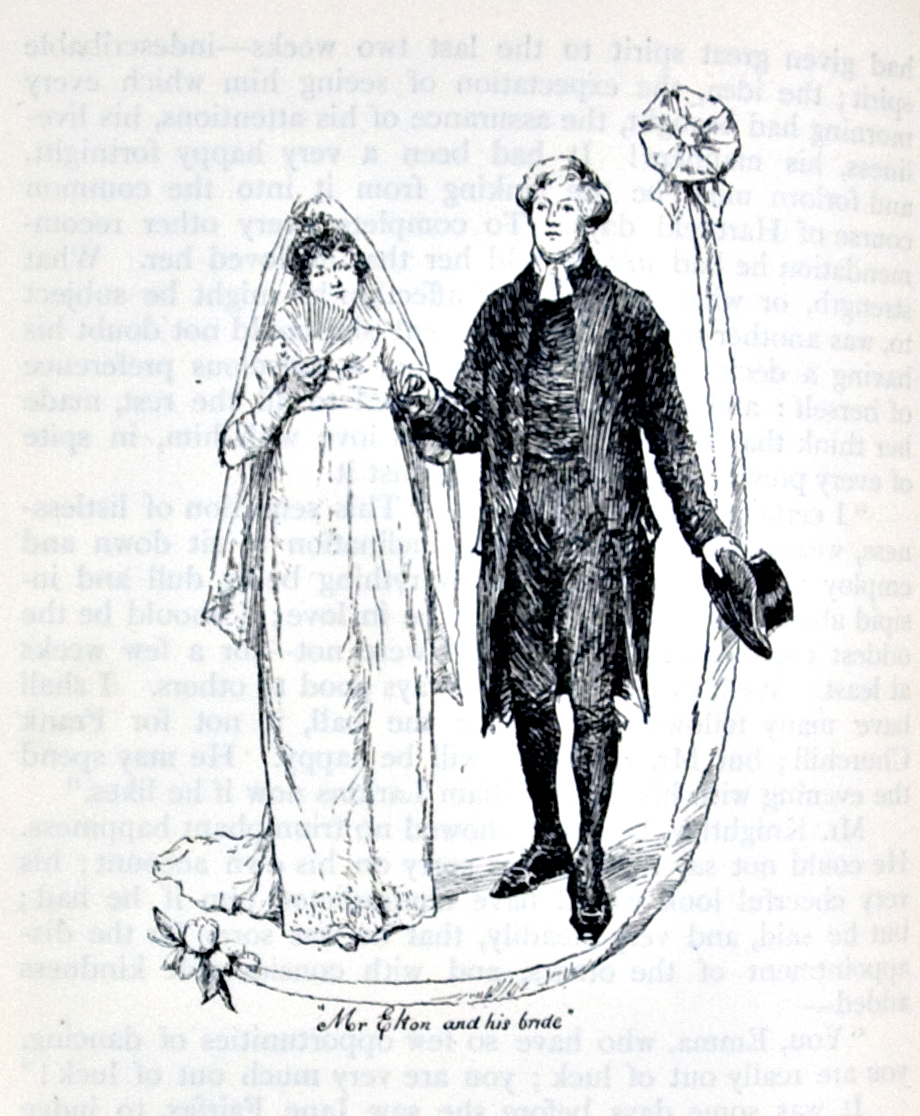
Mr Elton is very pleased to have "conquered both love and fortune" in the person of Miss Hawkins (Chris Hammond, 1898).

Jane Austen disapproved of marrying for money, but she also recognized that financial interests and mercantile motives were common in her society. Her novels often feature marriages driven by wealth, such as General Tilney in Northanger Abbey and Mr. Elliot in Persuasion, both of whom married for fortune. General Tilney married Miss Drummont, who brought a large dowry, while Mr. Elliot married an heiress, carefully considering her fortune before committing.

The cynical William Elliot's past is revealed to Anne by Mrs. Smith: "He wanted to make his fortune quickly and was determined to do so through marriage." He wed a well-bred and well-dowered heiress, prudently ensuring the exact amount of her fortune before committing. Mrs. Smith adds that "such things are so common that when someone, man or woman, marries for money, if you live in society, you hardly notice it."

Austen also portrays characters who pursue marriage for financial gain. Wealthy women, like Caroline Bingley or Mary Crawford, see marriage as a strategic move, while poorer women, like Isabella Thorpe, are desperate to find wealthy suitors but often fail. Mrs. Clay, an opportunist, tries to win the attention of Sir Walter Elliot’s heir, Mr. Elliot.

Lucy Steele is a skilled social climber, using flattery and manipulation to secure Edward Ferrars, but when he is disinherited, she shifts her focus to his wealthier brother. Austen often criticizes such characters, portraying them as selfish and shallow, with futures filled with domestic strife. (Note: Sterling insignificance. The play on words created by the use of the adjective sterling (excellent) in the oxymoron, which recalls the name of the currency, the pound sterling, is untranslatable.)

Other characters, like Miss Augusta Hawkins and Mr. Elton, are more focused on securing a match for their social advancement. Willoughby marries Miss Grey for her large dowry, and while he regrets losing Marianne Dashwood, he enjoys a degree of happiness in his marriage.

Finally, characters like John Dashwood and Mr. Elton marry women who suit their ambitions, leading to relationships that, while based on convenience, appear superficially harmonious, similar to Charlotte Lucas’s practical marriage to Mr. Collins.

==== The Maria Bertram case ====
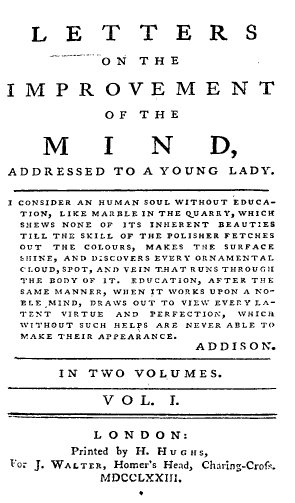
Hester Chapone's Conduct Manual gives advice on how to become a "good wife."

Maria Bertram in Mansfield Park is an example of someone who marries out of pride and spite. She marries James Rushworth, a wealthy but foolish man, as a way to escape the constraints of her father’s estate, though the marriage does not provide the freedom she expected. She soon becomes dissatisfied with him, feeling trapped in her new situation. Her marriage, like that of many women in her time, is seen as a means of securing financial stability rather than emotional fulfillment. (Note: Mary assumes that this marriage is, as in ancient tragedies, the sacrifice made so that her father may return safely from his voyage to the Antilles. Edmund affirms "with a serious smile" that there is no sacrifice but free choice, Mary replies that, naturally, "she has done only what every young woman would have done." ("it does put me in mind of some of the old heathen heroes, who, after performing great exploits in a foreign land, offered sacrifices to the gods on their safe return." "There is no sacrifice in the case," replied Edmund, with a serious smile; "it is entirely her own doing." "Oh yes I know it is. I was merely joking. She has done no more than what every young woman would do").) The marriage ends in scandal, as she succumbs to her feelings for Henry Crawford, leading to social rejection.

In the era’s conduct books, such as Hester Chapone's Letters on the Improvement of the Mind, there were warnings about marriages based solely on financial gain or social status. These books advised that such marriages would likely lead to disappointment and dissatisfaction. Authors like Thomas Gisborne and Mary Russell Mitford highlighted how women were often encouraged to marry for wealth or social standing, (Note: The Austens knew Mary Russell, the mother of the woman of letters, not pretty but well-endowed, prey to the charming and very spendthrift George Mitford, who very quickly devoured his wife's dowry.) but this mindset could undermine the possibility of forming genuine, lasting relationships.

== Role models ==
The married couples in Jane Austen’s novels are generally conventional and psychologically unfulfilled. However, she does provide a few examples of marriages that reflect her vision of a successful partnership. These include the Gardiners in Pride and Prejudice, the Westons and, to some extent, John and Isabella Knightley in Emma, and the Crofts in Persuasion. These couples are portrayed as happy, though not idealized, and serve as role models. Austen’s own parents, who loved each other, likely influenced her depiction of these relationships, though such couples were probably rarer in real life.

=== The Gardiners ===
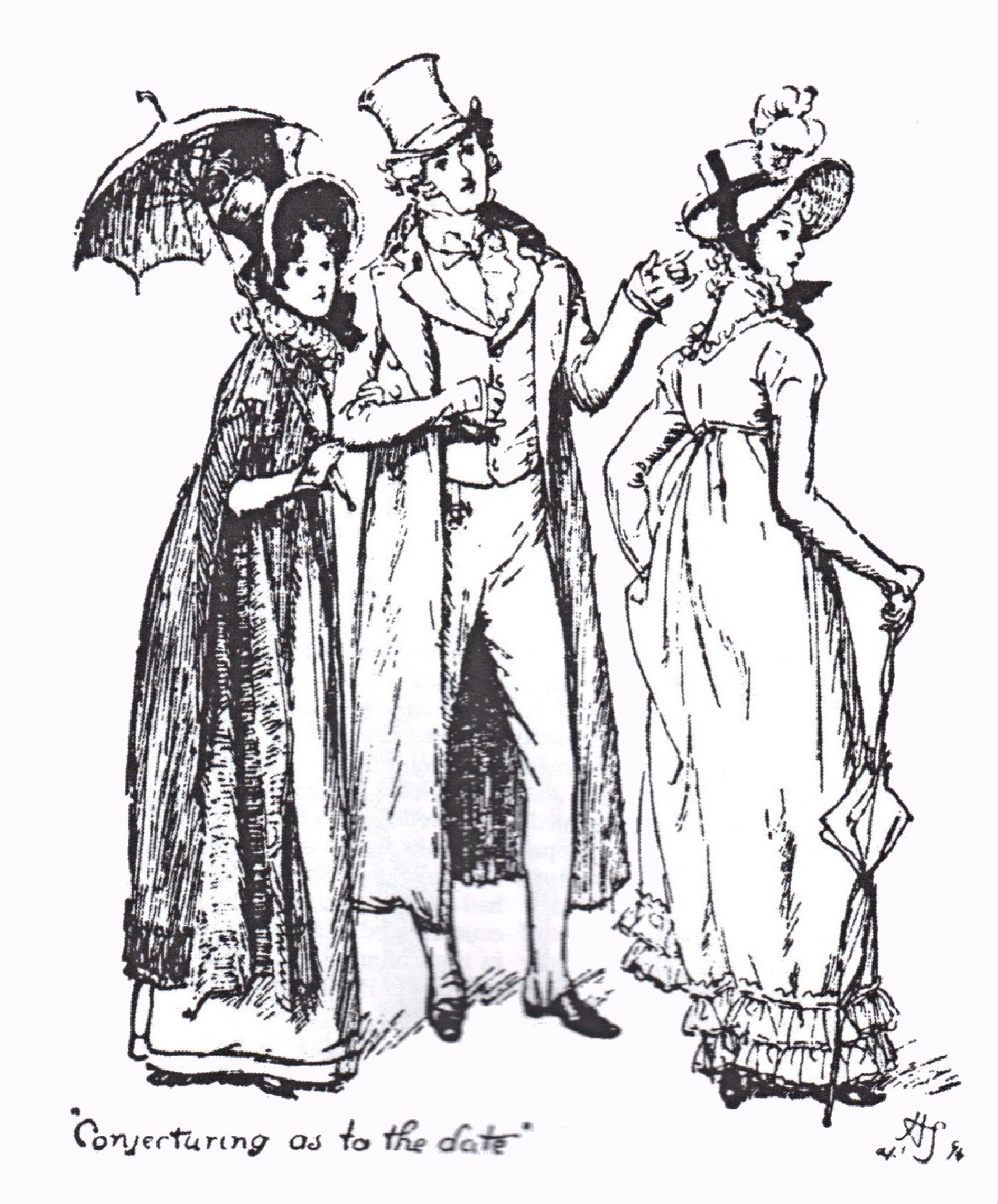
The Gardiners, here visiting Pemberley with Elizabeth, are a balanced couple (Hugh Thomson, 1894).

Jane Austen does not provide many details about the Gardiners' marriage, but it is clear that they have a well-balanced and happy relationship, in contrast to the Bennet couple. They share mutual respect and affection, creating a harmonious home. Their life is quiet and simple, yet they know how to entertain, as seen when they host Sir William, his daughter Maria, and Elizabeth, with activities like shopping and attending the theater.

As spiritual guides to the Bennet girls, the Gardiners demonstrate responsible parenthood. Mrs. Gardiner offers wise advice to her nieces, and Elizabeth turns to her for help when Lydia goes missing. Mr. Gardiner steps in to support Elizabeth, taking on the role of a father figure by leading her to the altar.

=== The happy couples in Emma ===
==== The Westons ====
Emma begins with Mr. Weston’s second marriage, which follows his recovery from a poor first marriage and the challenges of widowhood. With his newfound wealth and stability, he marries Miss Taylor, Emma's governess, offering her both a comfortable life and a respected position. Mr. Weston is portrayed as a well-regarded, kind man who appreciates the qualities of his second wife, recognizing the benefits of a thoughtful and amiable marriage.

Mr. Knightley humorously observes that Miss Taylor, having spent many years as a governess, is well-prepared for the duties of marriage, which require compromise. He also notes the practical benefits of her new situation, as she moves from being a dependent housekeeper to a respected, financially secure wife.

The couple’s happiness is attributed to their maturity, compatibility, and shared values. They are the only couple in the novel to have a child, a daughter, and Emma is pleased with the birth, hoping it will bring joy to both parents. This depiction contrasts with the more pessimistic view of women’s lives in earlier literature, such as in Mary Wollstonecraft's works.

==== John and Isabella ====
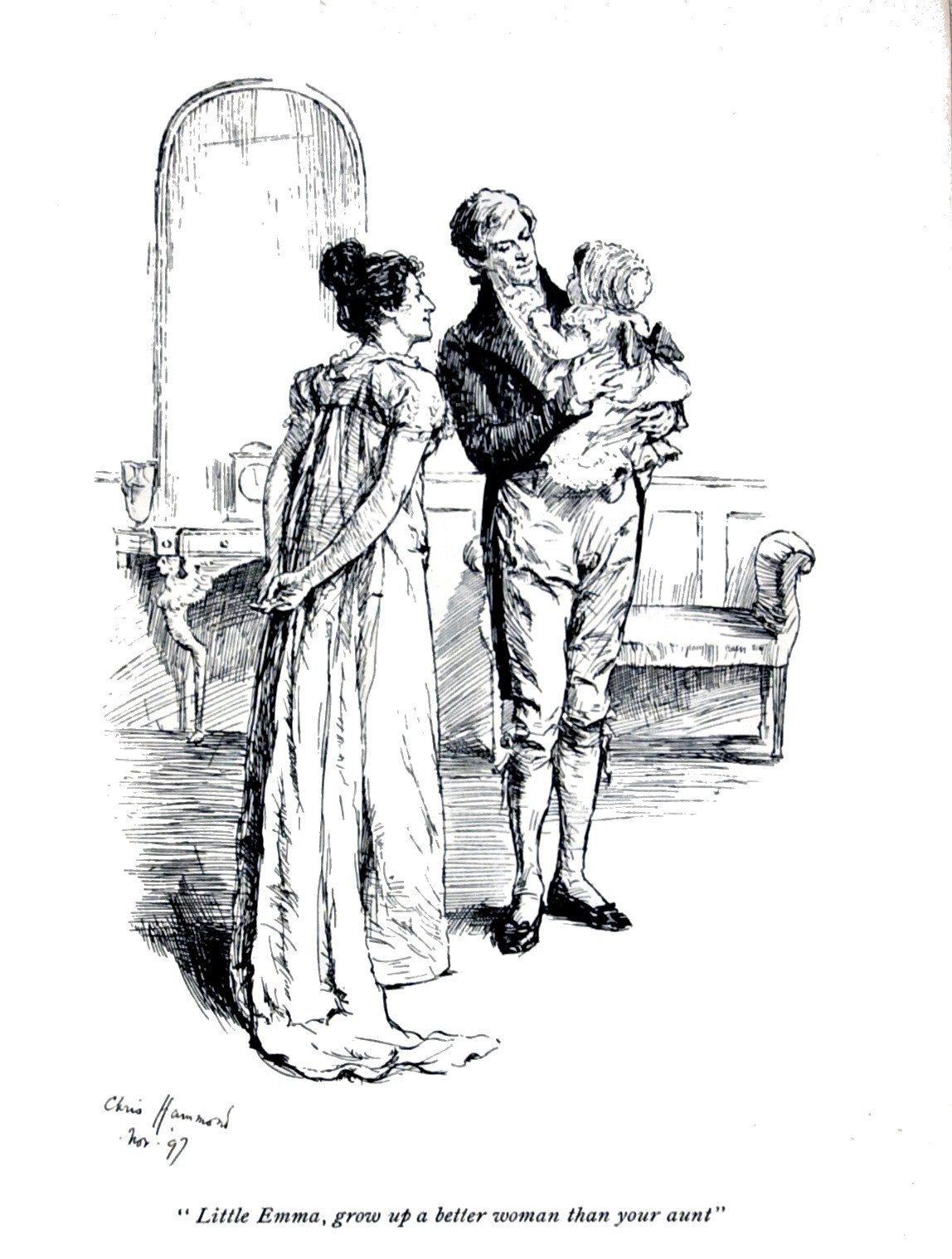
While caring for their niece, John and Isabella's baby, Emma and Mr. Knightley rediscover their friendly bond (Chap. 12).

Emma Woodhouse’s older sister, Isabella, has been married to John Knightley for seven years. Isabella is a kind, affectionate woman, devoted to her family, while John is intelligent but pragmatic, occasionally brusque, yet values domestic life. The couple shares a strong affection and has five children, whom they care for attentively. Their home in London is warm and welcoming, largely due to Isabella’s presence.

Their domestic happiness serves as a contrast to the eventual resolution of misunderstandings between Emma and Mr. Knightley, leading to their future happiness. Mr. Knightley sees qualities in Emma that set her apart from his sister Isabella, whom he views as similar to Emma but with certain shortcomings. (Note: ”There was too much domestic happiness in his brother's house; woman wore too amiable a form in it.”)

=== The Crofts ===
In Persuasion, two couples are depicted as particularly happy: the Harvilles and Admiral Croft and his wife. The Harvilles offer warmth and hospitality, while Admiral Croft and his wife exemplify a strong, supportive marriage. Their relationship is presented as a model of companionship, where both spouses thrive, and their easygoing natures contribute to their happiness. Mrs. Croft humorously remarks that others might not believe their quick engagement could lead to happiness, but their bond proves otherwise.

Anne Elliot and Frederick Wentworth observe the Crofts and learn from their example, especially Wentworth, who is challenged by his sister's traditional views on gender roles. Despite not being a romantic couple, the Crofts share a deep attachment and provide an image of happiness. Anne admires their relationship, finding the Admiral's kindness and Mrs. Croft's practicality particularly appealing.

Their partnership is marked by a balance of roles: while the Admiral is unmethodical, Mrs. Croft takes on tasks traditionally associated with men, showing practical skills and confidence in various situations.

== “Marital bliss" ==
In Persuasion, the narrator notes that when two young people decide to marry, they will usually persist in their decision, regardless of their financial situation or other obstacles. This theme is echoed by Elizabeth Bennet, who suggests that where there is affection, people often marry without waiting for ideal conditions, though she promises not to rush into such decisions.

=== Portrait of the ideal husband ===
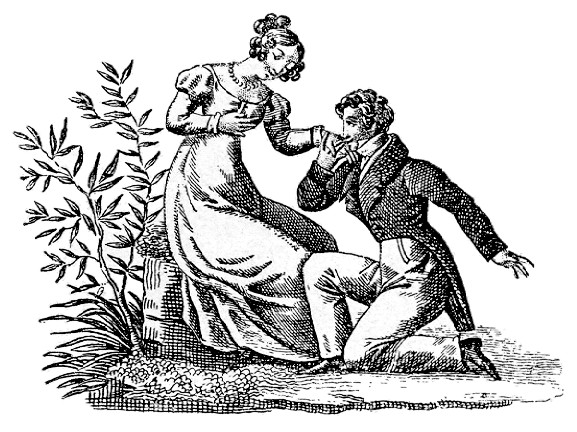
The marriage proposal (circa 1815).

Jane Austen clearly defines the right partner for each of her heroines, often matching them based on similar character traits. For example, Jane Bennet and Charles Bingley share similar temperaments, while Elinor Dashwood and Edward Ferrars have aligned tastes and rational minds. Some couples, like Fanny Price and Edmund Bertram, are bonded by mutual respect and shared values. Austen also highlights how relationships bring mutual growth, with the heroine balancing out her partner’s weaknesses and vice versa.

While the male characters may have their flaws, such as Darcy’s pride or Wentworth’s past, they often must evolve to win the heroine’s affection. The age difference between couples typically hovers around six or seven years, though some heroines marry older men. Sometimes, the men take on a mentor-like role, as seen with characters like Henry Tilney and Mr. Knightley. This dynamic raises questions about why Austen often pairs her most intelligent heroines with men who may seem more like father figures.

Austen’s heroines, being rational and intelligent, require husbands who can match their intellectual level, respect them, and support their development. While they are not perfect and make mistakes, they learn from them, demonstrating that their intelligence and common sense make them deserving of love. (Note: "Looked up to him as a superior": this is what Mr Bennet says to Elizabeth, when she announces her engagement to him.)

=== Necessary elements ===
==== Compatibility and delicacy of feelings ====
===== Anything is better than a loveless marriage! =====
Throughout several of Jane Austen's novels, women frequently disapprove of the prospect of loveless relationships. For example, “Oh, Lizzy! Do anything rather than marry without affection!” is Jane Bennet's cry when she learns that her sister and Darcy have become engaged. (Note: "Anything is to be preferred or endured rather than marrying without affection" Jane Austen wrote to her niece Fanny Knight on November 18, 1814.) This sentiment is further reflected in Elizabeth's disapproval of both Mr. Collins' and Mr. Darcy's proposals; Fanny Price's rejection of Henry Crawford's; and Anne Elliot's refusal of Charles Musgrove.

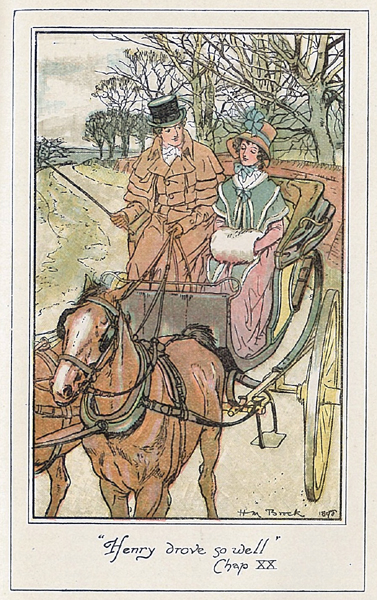
"When he became aware of her fondness for him," Henry Tilney began to think seriously of Catherine (H. M. Brock, 1898).

In Jane Austen's novels, the heroines make choices based on affection and respect, not economic reasons. A successful marriage, in her view, balances emotional connection and mutual esteem. While characters may experience love, it is not immediate or based on intense passion but grows through shared understanding and respect. (Note: The narrator admits: "his affection originated in nothing better than gratitude, or, in other words, that a persuasion of her partiality for him had been the only cause of giving her a serious thought." She acknowledges that this is "new, in romantic fiction at least, even horribly degrading to the dignity of the heroine" (who is forbidden by social conventions from making the first move).) For example, Edmund Bertram’s affection for Fanny develops over time, and Mr. Knightley realizes his feelings for Emma through jealousy.

Darcy initially dismisses Elizabeth but later finds himself attracted to her. Elizabeth rejects him due to his arrogance and self-importance, expecting more from a potential partner. She had already decided he was not the right person for her before he proposed.

===== A “map of Tendre” =====
Jane Austen suggests that marriages based solely on physical attraction are unlikely to succeed. In her novels, romantic desire is subtle, with the emphasis on moral and intellectual qualities rather than overt physical attraction. While characters like Willoughby, Wickham, and Crawford are charming, the more serious suitors—such as Mr. Darcy, Mr. Knightley, and Captain Wentworth—possess a strong, noble presence. The characters express their emotions through conversation, often away from others, where they share their feelings and commitment. (Note: Modern readers, accustomed to romantic statements and more direct language, often have difficulty understanding Jane Austen's discretion in confession scenes, explains Hansen (2000).) (Note: In this regard, Tony Tanner recalls that, according to Freud, "blushing is a kind of slight erection of the head.")

Love in Austen's stories develops slowly and often without the characters noticing at first. For example, Darcy describes his love for Elizabeth as something that grew gradually, without him realizing it until later. Similarly, Edward Ferrars only recognizes the depth of his feelings for Elinor after comparing her to Lucy Steele. (Note: ”I purposely abstain from dates on this occasion […] I only entreat everybody to believe that exactly at the time when it was quite natural that it should be so, and not a week earlier, Edmund did cease to care about Miss Crawford, and became as anxious to marry Fanny as Fanny herself could desire.”)

The growth of love is often shown over time, as the plot of the novels typically spans a year or more, allowing the characters to understand and appreciate each other. Austen’s idea of true love is rooted in reason, with characters acknowledging the qualities that draw them to each other, even if those feelings develop unexpectedly.

==== Social and financial compatibility ====
Jane Austen, who lives in a pragmatic, mercantile society, never fails, for the sake of realism, to point out the means of existence on which not the happiness but the material comfort of her heroines depends. While the girls often marry into their social class, with perfect, educated gentlemen as complex (intricate, as Elizabeth Bennet would say) and intelligent as themselves, whether landlords or clergymen, there are very few to whom she offers “fairy-tale” opulence.

===== Sufficient income to live well =====
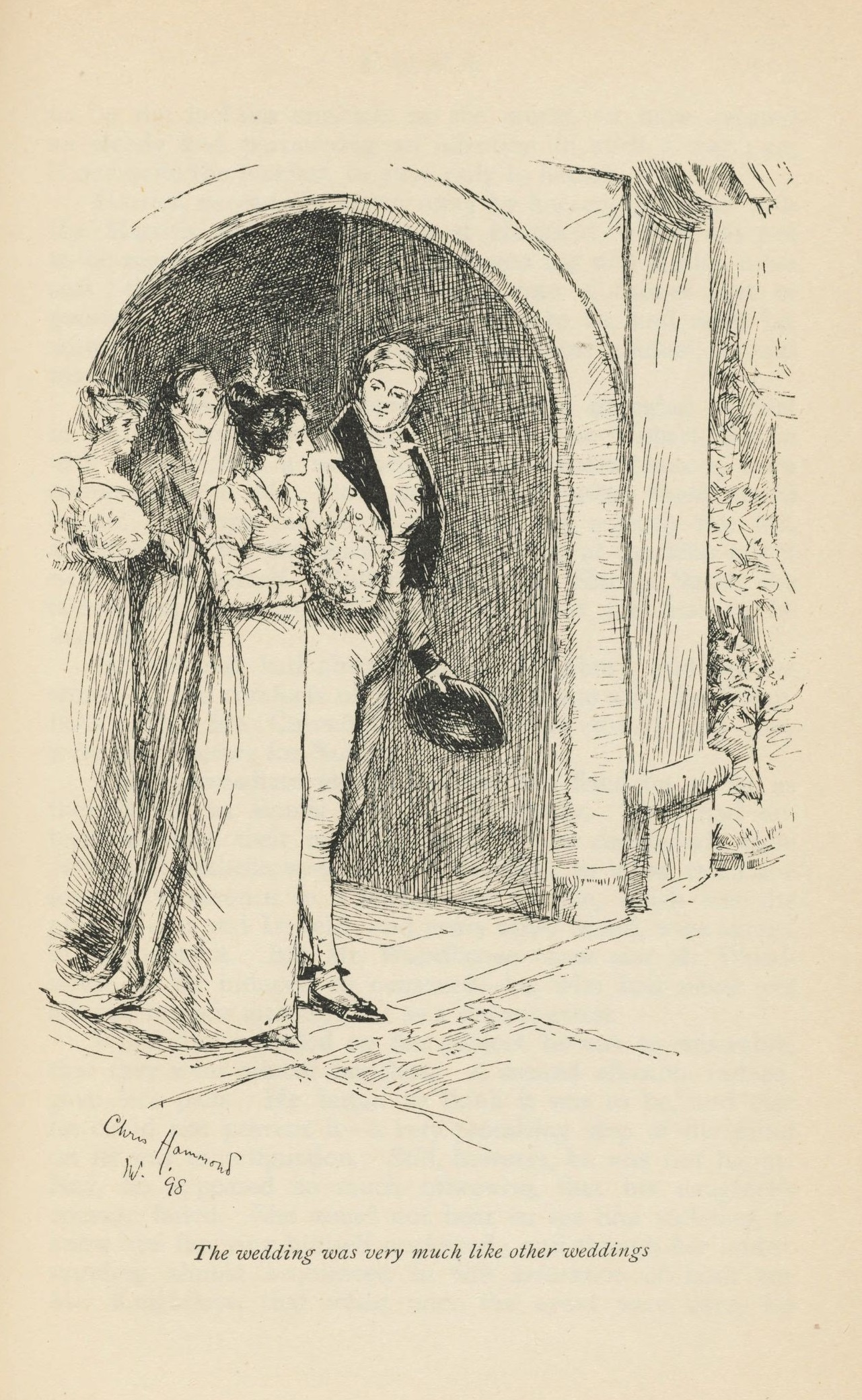
A simple and unpretentious wedding, but one that promises "perfect happiness" for Emma and Mr Knightley. (Chris Hammond, 1998)

The wealth of young couples in Jane Austen's novels varies, but it is generally enough for personal happiness. Some, like Elinor and Edward, have modest incomes, while others, like Captain Wentworth and Mr. Darcy, are significantly wealthier. (Note: Anne, who is about to turn thirty, receives from her parents, General Mathiew and his wife Lady Jane Bertie, an annual allowance of £100 and James, of the Leigh family, the vicarage of Cubbington in Warwickshire, which brings in £200, and "it is hardly necessary to add that this income is insufficient.")

While some characters start with smaller amounts, they often see an increase in wealth through marriage or inheritance. Overall, Austen’s characters have a wide range of financial situations, from moderate to very comfortable, but money is always presented as a factor in their well-being. (Note: The pay of a senior officer in the Royal Navy on active service does not exceed, at best, £400 per annum. See Pay and half-pay of a captain.)

===== A change in status =====
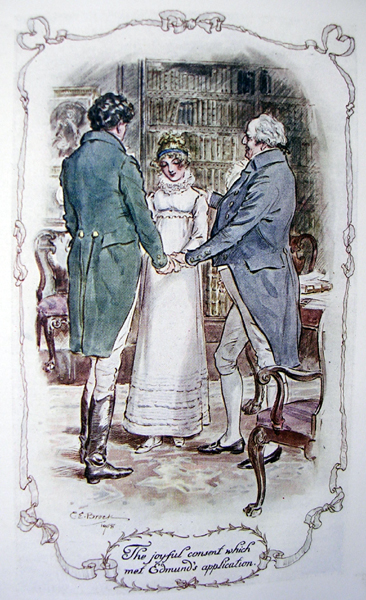
By accepting Fanny as Edmund's wife, Sir Bertram recognizes her moral worth (C. E. Brock, 1908).

Elizabeth Bennet, Fanny Price, and Anne Elliot each experience a shift in social status through marriage. Elizabeth’s marriage to Mr. Darcy, while romantic, challenges social norms, as she marries above her class and he chooses love over social expectations.

Fanny Price, coming from a lower middle-class background, adapts well to the values of the wealthy family she marries into. Anne Elliot, who initially faces a mismatch by marrying a man of lower social rank, ultimately finds that her husband, Captain Wentworth, has earned his fortune and is respected in society. In each case, marriage brings a change in social dynamics, but each woman navigates these shifts in different ways.

==== Endogamy ====
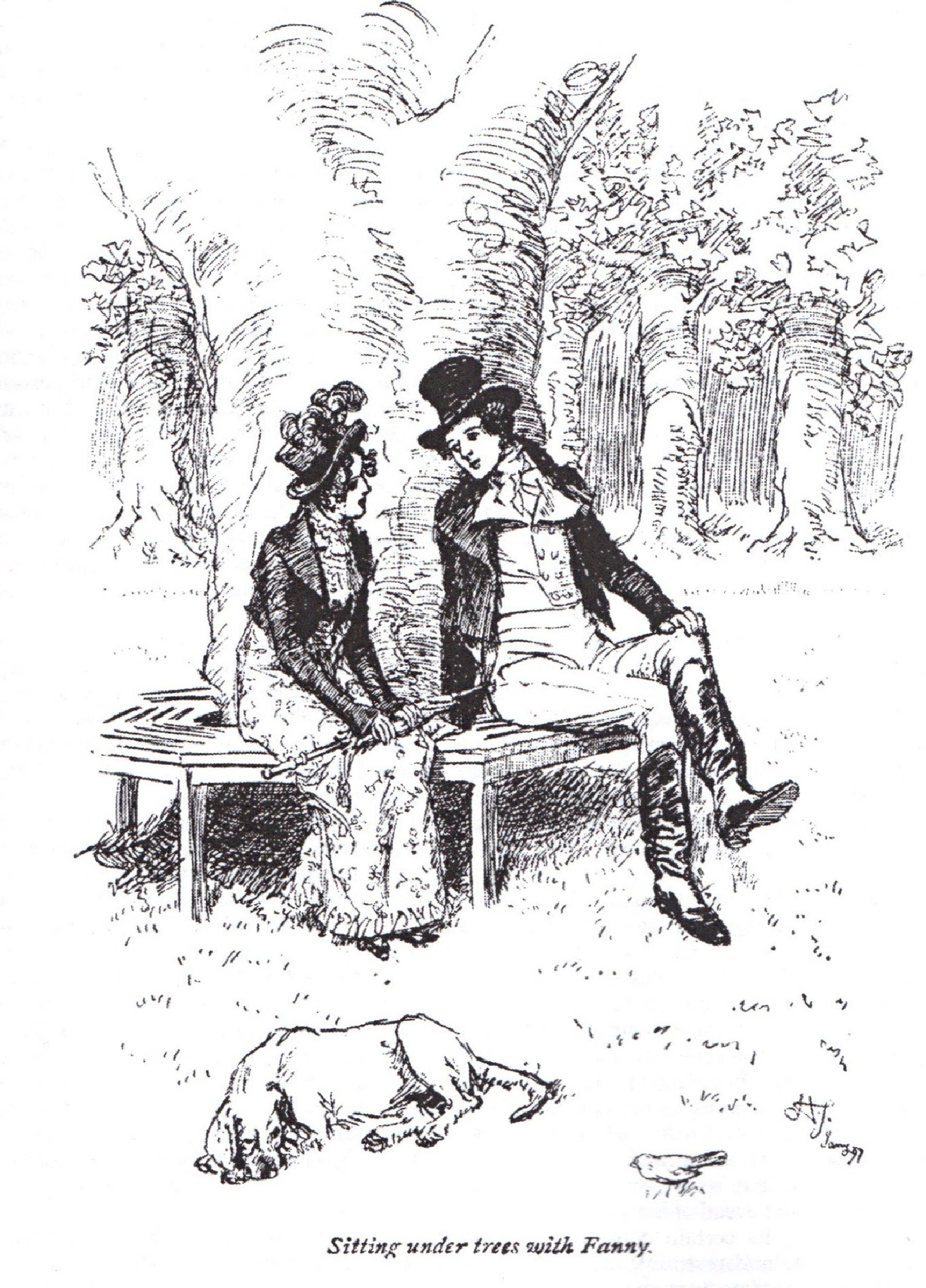
In Mansfield Park, Fanny and Edmund experience the transition from brotherly love to marital love (Hugh Thomson, 1897).

Marriage between cousins was relatively common during Jane Austen’s time, even in her own family. However, in her novels, only a few characters marry within their family, such as Henrietta Musgrove and Charles Hayter in Persuasion and Edmund Bertram and Fanny Price in Mansfield Park. While these marriages align with social expectations, many of Austen’s protagonists reject such unions. Elizabeth Bennet refuses to marry her cousin, Mr. Collins, and Anne Elliot declines to marry her cousin, Walter Elliot. (Note: Marriage between first cousins, admitted by the Anglican Communion, was estimated in 1875 by George Darwin at 3.5% in the middle class and 4.5% in the aristocracy. In countries with a Catholic tradition, a dispensation from the Pope is required to contract such a union, considered by some communities to be incestuous.)

Given the limited social circles in which these characters move, many relationships begin with close, sibling-like friendships. For example, Emma Woodhouse marries Mr. Knightley, who has known her since childhood, and Elinor Dashwood falls in love with her brother-in-law’s brother. Similarly, Catherine Morland meets Henry Tilney through mutual connections, and Jane and Elizabeth Bennet marry men who happen to be in their region for the hunting season.

Some marriages, like those of Anne Elliot and Louisa Musgrove, involve outsiders—sailors without strong ties to the local aristocracy. However, Anne first meets Frederick Wentworth during his time in the area while awaiting a new command, and Louisa becomes engaged to James Benwick after spending time with him during her recovery.

=== Approach angles and outcomes ===
In Jane Austen's novels, the approach to marriage differs. For some heroines, marriage is seen as a reward after enduring trials, but for others, it may feel more like a compromise. For example, Marianne's marriage to Colonel Brandon and Jane Bennet's marriage to Charles Bingley are sometimes viewed as sacrifices rather than true fulfillment.

==== Personal fulfillment ====
What matters most for Austen's heroines is personal happiness, not social expectations. Elizabeth Bennet rejects Mr. Collins’s proposal because she knows she wouldn’t be happy with him, and she also turns down Darcy's initial proposal. Similarly, Fanny Price refuses Henry Crawford, feeling she could not be happy with him, and Anne Elliot rejects Charles Musgrove because of her lingering feelings for Frederick Wentworth.

Elizabeth is particularly clear about her desire for happiness based on her values. When discussing marriage with Lady Catherine, she asserts that she will act in a way that ensures her happiness, without being influenced by others’ opinions.

==== Second chances ====
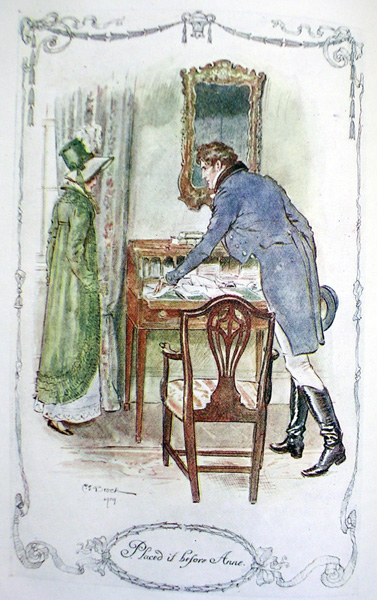
Frederick Wentworth points out to Anne the letter he has just written to her.

Second chances are a common theme in Jane Austen’s novels. Darcy offers Elizabeth Bennet a second chance at love after he overcomes his pride. Jane Bennet also gets a second chance when Bingley renews his interest in her, with Darcy’s encouragement. Similarly, Harriet Smith accepts Robert Martin’s proposal after initially rejecting him. (Note: Robert Martin is an "interesting" character for Mona Scheuermann. He is only a farmer, a commoner, but, in his social category, he is as perfect as Mr Knightley is in his: full of good sense, intelligent, serious, he also has great qualities of heart; he is, says Mr Knightley who appreciates him very much, "an excellent young man, both as son and brother" ("He is an excellent young man, both as son and brother").)

The most notable example of a second chance is the relationship between Anne Elliot and Frederick Wentworth. After being persuaded to break off their engagement years earlier due to financial concerns, they are separated for eight years. When Wentworth returns, he is surprised to find Anne still unmarried, and he has not yet fully let go of his resentment. However, after reflecting on his feelings and observing Anne’s steadiness, Wentworth finally lets go of his bitterness and admires her more deeply. In the end, he proposes again, offering his love with greater sincerity than before.

==== Second attachments ====
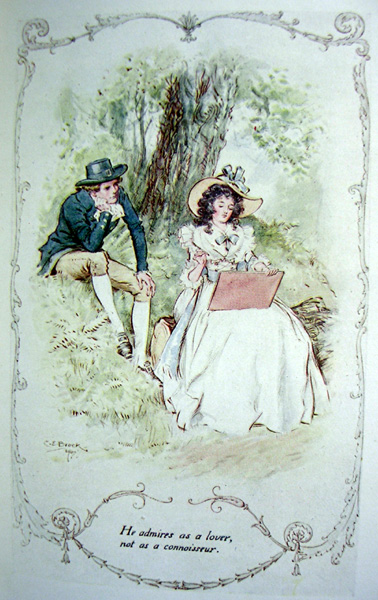
Edward Ferrars fell in love with Elinor, while he had imprudently become engaged to Lucy Steele.

In many of Jane Austen's novels, characters experience love more than once, which contrasts with the view in sentimental novels of the time, where first love is seen as lasting forever. Marianne Dashwood initially believes second attachments are impossible, but over time, she becomes devoted to her husband after loving Willoughby. Similarly, Elizabeth Bennet is initially attracted to Wickham, then later develops feelings for Darcy. Louisa Musgrove also shifts her affections from Captain Wentworth to Captain Benwick.

Male characters in Austen's novels also experience multiple attachments. Edward Ferrars initially has a fleeting infatuation with Lucy Steele before falling in love with Elinor Dashwood. Colonel Brandon, after a past attachment to his cousin Eliza, falls in love with Marianne. Edmund Bertram moves from being attracted to Mary Crawford to realizing his love for his cousin, Fanny Price. In Emma, Captain Weston remarries after the death of his first wife, and Harriet Smith moves from being interested in Mr. Elton to Mr. Knightley before eventually accepting Robert Martin’s proposal. In Persuasion, Charles Musgrove shifts his attention to Mary Elliot after Anne Elliot rejects him, while James Benwick forms an attachment to Louisa Musgrove after the death of his fiancée.

==== Fulfillment ====
In marriage, a woman traditionally pledges loyalty and obedience to her husband, (Note: In the words of the Anglican marriage liturgy, the man promises to "love her, comfort her, honour, and keep her in sickness and in health", while she promises first and foremost to "obey him, and serve him, love, honour, and keep him in sickness and in health.") giving up her legal identity and fortune in exchange for the status of a married woman. Jane Austen, however, challenges this conventional view by suggesting that young people should follow their hearts when it comes to love. In Persuasion, she emphasizes that perseverance can bring couples together, and in Northanger Abbey, she suggests that even interference can strengthen a relationship.

Austen’s heroines do not conform to the traditional idea of silent, submissive wives. Instead, their marriages are based on love, respect, and mutual trust, with both partners sharing an equal role in the relationship. (Note: In each marriage, love, esteem, compatibility and mutuality, capability and respect – and equality, Swords (1988).) While Austen assures readers that these marriages will be happy, she refrains from detailing the day-to-day aspects of married life.

The marriages in her novels often symbolize the formation of a new, supportive community. For example, in Sense and Sensibility, a community forms around the Brandons and Ferrars, while in Pride and Prejudice, the Darcys and Bingleys create a close-knit group in Derbyshire. living less than thirty miles apart and intimately involving the Gardiners in their lives. Similarly, Mansfield Park shows the strengthening of family bonds, and in Emma, marriage enhances community ties in Surrey. In each case, the strength of the unions is reinforced by friendships within their community, which is typically centered around traditional estates.

Anne Elliot, in Persuasion, is the exception, as she marries Frederick Wentworth, a naval officer with no land-based ties. This marks her departure from the stagnant social class of the landed gentry. She embraces a new community within the naval world, which becomes her chosen family.

== See also ==
- Jane Austen
- Georgian society in Jane Austen's novels
- Pride and Prejudice
- Persuasion
- Emma
- Mansfield Park
- Sense and Sensibility
- Northanger Abbey

=== External links ===
- "Loveless Marriage". Austenette Worlds. 2009.
- "Woman in Love". Austenette Worlds. 2009.
- "Elizabeth's Love for Darcy: Holy Matrimony". Austenette Worlds. 2009.
- "Marriage and the Alternatives: The Status of Women". Republic of Pemberley.
- Easton, Celia (2009). "The Sibling Ideal in Jane Austen's Novels: When Near Incest Really is Best". JASNA.
- Hansen, Serena (2000). "Rhetorical Dynamics in Jane Austen's Treatment of Marriage Proposals". JASNA.

== Bibliography ==
- Massei-Chamayou, Marie-Laure (2012). La Représentation de l'argent dans les romans de Jane Austen: L'être et l'avoir [The Representation of Money in Jane Austen's Novels: Being and Having] (in French). Paris: L'Harmattan. p. 410. ISBN 978-2-296-99341-9.
- Jones, Hazel (2009). Jane Austen and marriage. Londres: Continuum International Publishing Group. p. 248. ISBN 978-1-84725-218-0.
- Graham, Peter W. (2008). Jane Austen & Charles Darwin: naturalists and novelists. Aldershot: Ashgate Publishing. p. 196. ISBN 978-0-7546-5851-1.
- Schmidt, Katrin (2008). The Role of Marriage in Jane Austen's Pride and Prejudice. GRIN Verlag. p. 36. ISBN 978-3-638-84921-0.
- Gast, Nicole (2007). Marriages and the Alternatives in Jane Austen's Pride and Prejudice. GRIN Verlag. p. 24. ISBN 978-3-638-79147-2.
- Kramp, Michael (2007). Disciplining love: Austen and the modern man. Columbus: Ohio State University Press. p. 202. ISBN 978-0-8142-1046-8.
- Martin, Lydia (2007). Les adaptations à l'écran des romans de Jane Austen: esthétique et idéologie [Screen adaptations of Jane Austen's novels: aesthetics and ideology] (in French). Paris: Editions L'Harmattan. p. 270. ISBN 978-2-296-03901-8.
- Morrison, Robert (2005). Jane Austen's "Pride and prejudice": a sourcebook. New York: Routledge. p. 172. ISBN 0-415-26849-4.
- Auerbach, Emily (2004). Searching for Jane Austen. Madison: The University of Wisconsin Press. p. 344. ISBN 0-299-20184-8.
- Carroll, Joseph (2004). Literary Darwinism: evolution, human nature, and literature. Routledge. p. 176. ISBN 978-0-415-97014-3.
- Stovel, Bruce; Gregg, Lynn Weinlos (2003). The Talk in Jane Austen. Edmonton: University of Alberta. p. 269. ISBN 978-0-88864-374-2.
- Goubert, Pierre (2000). Le regard de la femme dans les romans de Jane Austen [The female gaze in Jane Austen's novels] (PDF) (in French). Vol. 1. Cercles.
- Brooke, Christopher (1999). "Marriage in the Novels". Jane Austen: illusion and reality. Boydell & Brewer. p. 224. ISBN 978-0-85991-557-1.
- Gillooly, Eileen (1999). Smile of discontent: humor, gender, and nineteenth-century British fiction. Chicago: University of Chicago Press. p. 289. ISBN 978-0-226-29402-5.
- Myer, Valerie Grosvenor (1997). Jane Austen, obstinate heart: a biography. Arcade Publishing. p. 268. ISBN 978-1-55970-387-1.
- Scheuermann, Mona (1993). "Jane Austen, Pride and Prejudice and Emma". Her bread to earn: women, money, and society from Defoe to Austen. University Press of Kentucky. p. 284. ISBN 978-0-8131-1817-8.
- Goubert, Pierre (1975). Jane Austen: étude psychologique de la romancière [Jane Austen: A Psychological Study of the Novelist] (in French). Publications de l'Université de Rouen. ISBN 978-2-87775-735-5.
- Tanner, Tony (1975). "Knowledge and Opinions: Pride and Prejudice". Jane Austen. Harvard University Press. p. 291. ISBN 978-0-674-47174-0.
- Sutherland, Kathryn (2003). Introduction to Mansfield Park by Jane Austen. Penguin Classics.
- Jones, Vivien (2003). Introduction à Pride and Prejudice. Penguin Classics. ISBN 978-0-14-190721-5.
