= Sense and Sensibility (2024 film) =

American TV film

- Promotional release poster
- Genre: Historical romance
- Based on: Sense and Sensibility by Jane Austen
- Teleplay by: Tim Huddleston
- Directed by: Roger M. Bobb
- Starring: Deborah Ayorinde; Bethany Antonia; Dan Jeannotte
- Music by: Kerry Muzzey
- Country of origin: United States
- Original language: English

Production
- Executive producer: Tia A. Smith
- Producers: Kristina Kambitova; Jeffery Beach; Phillip J. Roth
- Cinematography: Alexander Krumov
- Editor: Luis Lam
- Running time: 84 minutes
- Production company: UFO International Productions

Original release
- Network: Hallmark Channel
- Release: February 24, 2024

Sense and Sensibility is a 2024 American historical romance television film based on the 1811 novel by Jane Austen.

Broadcast on the Hallmark Channel on 24 February 2024, the film was produced under the Hallmark Mahogany umbrella and features a predominantly black cast.

== Cast ==
- Deborah Ayorinde as Elinor Dashwood
- Dan Jeannotte as Edward Ferrars
- Bethany Antonia as Marianne Dashwood
- Akil Largie as Colonel Brandon
- Victor Hugo de Oliveira Mauricio as John Willoughby
- Susan Lawson-Reynolds as Mary
- Martina Laird as Mrs. Jennings
- Edward Bennett as Sir John Middleton
- Beth Angus as Meg
- Victoria Ekanoye as Lucy Steele
- Anna Crichlow as Anne
- Daniel Boyd as John Dashwood
- Carlyss Peer as Fanny
- Dimitri Gripari as Robert Ferrars
- Karlina Grace-Paseda as Mrs. Ferrars
- Daniel Costello as Thomas
- Julian Firth as Henry Dashwood
- Gary Pillai as Doctor
