= From Prada to Nada =

- Theatrical release poster
- Directed by: Angel Gracia
- Screenplay by: Fina Torres; Luis Alfaro; Craig Fernandez
- Based on: Sense and Sensibility by Jane Austen
- Produced by: Gigi Pritzker; Linda McDonough; Rossana Arau; Gary Gilbert; Lisa Ellzey
- Starring: Camilla Belle; Alexa Vega; Wilmer Valderrama; Nicholas D'Agosto; April Bowlby; Kuno Becker; Adriana Barraza
- Cinematography: Héctor Ortega
- Edited by: Bradley McLaughlin
- Music by: Heitor Pereira
- Production companies: OddLot Entertainment; Gilbert Films; Lionsgate; Televisa Films; Hyperion Films
- Distributed by: Pantelion Films; Lionsgate (United States)
- Release date: January 28, 2011 (United States)
- Running time: 107 minutes
- Country: United States
- Languages: English; Spanish
- Box office: $4 million

From Prada to Nada is a 2011 American romantic comedy film directed by Angel Gracia, loosely based on Jane Austen's 1811 novel Sense and Sensibility. The screenplay was adapted by Fina Torres, Luis Alfaro, and Craig Fernandez to be a Latino version of the English novel, where two spoiled sisters, who have been left penniless after their father's sudden death, are forced to move in with their estranged aunt in East Los Angeles.

The film received a limited release in the United States on January 28, 2011, by Lionsgate and Pantelion Films (a joint venture of Televisa and Lionsgate). In the United States, it grossed $3 million theatrically; the US box office result met Pantelion's expectation.

== Plot ==
At the reading of their father's will, wealthy sisters Nora and Mary discover that they are bankrupt and are forced to sell their house to their half-brother Gabe Hernandez, who lets them live with him and his wife, Olivia. After Olivia tries to move them into the basement, the girls leave the house and move in with their maternal aunt, Aurelia, in East Los Angeles. Nora quits law school and finds a job as a legal clerk to help support herself and Mary. Mary returns to college, where she meets and flirts with rich instructor Rodrigo while being admired from afar by Aurelia's neighbor Bruno. Nora arrives at her new job and learns that her boss is Olivia's brother Edward, whom she falls in love with.

The bulk of the film consists of a series of romantic escapades between the girls and their boyfriends, set against the backdrop of various parties and the Mexican-American cultural environment of East Los Angeles. In the end, Mary admits her feelings for Bruno and they kiss for the first time. Edward buys the house across from Aurelia and presents Nora the front door key, attached to an engagement ring. Family and friends are seen celebrating at Nora and Edward's street party wedding.

== Cast ==
- Camilla Belle as Nora Dominguez, a law student who does not want to put relationships above her career.
- Alexa Vega as Mary Dominguez, Nora's younger, frivolous sister, who is a shopaholic.
- Pablo Cruz Guerrero as Gabriel "Gabe" Dominguez, Sr., Mary and Nora's half-brother
- April Bowlby as Olivia, Gabe's mean and selfish wife.
- Wilmer Valderrama as Bruno, the next-door neighbor of Aunt Aurelia who falls for Mary.
- Nicholas D'Agosto as Edward Ferris, Olivia's brother.
- Alexis Ayala as Gabriel Dominguez, Sr., Mary and Nora's father.
- Kuno Becker as Rodrigo Fuentes, Mary's love interest.
- Adriana Barraza as Aurelia Jimenez, Nora and Mary's maternal aunt.

== Production ==
The majority of the film was shot in Monterrey, with shooting also taking place in Los Angeles.

== Release ==
From Prada to Nada was released on Blu-ray and DVD on May 3, 2011.

On the review aggregator website Rotten Tomatoes, the film holds an approval rating of 20% based on 20 reviews, with an average rating of 4.1/10. Metacritic, which uses a weighted average, assigned the film a score of 39 out of 100, based on 10 critics, indicating "generally unfavorable" reviews.

=== Accolades ===
| Year | Award | Category | Recipient | Result |
|---|---|---|---|---|
| 2011 | 12th ALMA Awards | Favorite Movie Actress – Comedy/Musical | Alexa Vega | Won |
| 2011 | 12th ALMA Awards | Favorite Movie | From Prada to Nada | Nominated |
