= Sense and Sensibility (2008 TV series) =

British drama television series

- DVD cover
- Genre: Costume drama
- Based on: Sense and Sensibility by Jane Austen
- Screenplay by: Andrew Davies
- Directed by: John Alexander
- Starring: Hattie Morahan; Charity Wakefield; Dan Stevens; David Morrissey; Dominic Cooper
- Theme music composer: Martin Phipps
- Country of origin: United Kingdom
- Original language: English
- No. of episodes: 3

Production
- Producer: Anne Pivcevic
- Cinematography: Sean Bobbitt
- Editor: Roy Sharman
- Running time: 174 minutes
- Production companies: BBC; WGBH Boston

Original release
- Network: BBC One
- Release: 1 January – 13 January 2008

Sense and Sensibility is a 2008 British television drama adaptation of Jane Austen's 1811 novel Sense and Sensibility. The screenplay was written by Andrew Davies, who said that the aim of the series was to make viewers forget Ang Lee's 1995 film Sense and Sensibility. The series was "more overtly sexual" than previous Austen adaptations, and Davies included scenes featuring a seduction and a duel that are suggested in Austen's book but were absent from the feature film. Sense and Sensibility was directed by John Alexander and produced by Anne Pivcevic. Hattie Morahan and Charity Wakefield starred as Elinor and Marianne Dashwood, two sisters who go on "a voyage of burgeoning sexual and romantic discovery".

The series was shot on location in the English counties of Berkshire, Surrey, Buckinghamshire and Devon for two months from April 2007. Sense and Sensibility was co-produced by the BBC and American studio WGBH Boston. It was aired in three parts from 1 January 2008 in the United Kingdom and attracted an average of 6 million viewers per episode. The first episode also became one of the top ten most streamed programmes on the BBC iPlayer. Sense and Sensibility garnered mostly positive reviews from television critics, while the cast and crew earned several award nominations for their work. It was released on a two-disc DVD in the UK on 14 January 2008.

== Plot ==
When Henry Dashwood dies, his entire fortune and estate, Norland Park, are left to his son, John, as required by law. John promises his father to provide for his stepmother Mary Dashwood and his half-sisters Elinor, Marianne, and Margaret. However, John's wife Fanny persuades him to make a much smaller provision than he had intended. John and Fanny take possession of Norland Park as the new owners, leaving Mrs Dashwood and her daughters guests in what was their own home.

Fanny's brother Edward Ferrars comes to visit, and is attracted to Elinor. Mrs Dashwood hopes they will become engaged, but Fanny informs her that his mother has decided that Edward must marry a richer and more socially prominent woman. Mrs Dashwood's cousin, Sir John Middleton, writes to offer a small cottage on his estate, Barton Park in Devonshire. She and her daughters leave Norland immediately.

Sir John introduces the Dashwoods to his wife, Lady Middleton, her mother, Mrs Jennings, and their family friend, Colonel Brandon. Brandon is instantly attracted to Marianne, though she considers him far too old for her. While out walking with Margaret, Marianne falls and twists her ankle. A handsome young man appears and carries her back to the cottage. He introduces himself as John Willoughby and promises to check on Marianne the following day. Brandon also visits, but upon seeing Willoughby quickly departs. Willoughby and Marianne grow close through their mutual love of poetry, and he later takes a lock of her hair. Mrs Dashwood and Elinor wonder whether if they are secretly engaged.

Brandon invites the Dashwoods and the Middletons to a picnic on his estate, Delaford. Just as they party is about to embark, Brandon is called away on urgent business. Willoughby later requests a private meeting first with Marianne and then Mrs Dashwood, leading them to expect that he will propose marriage. However, he reveals that his aunt is sending him to London on business and he may not be able to return for at least a year. Shortly after Willoughby's departure, Edward visits. The Dashwoods notice that he appears unhappy and distant.

Lucy and Anne Steele, Mrs Jennings' nieces, come to visit. When Lucy learns that the Dashwoods are acquainted with the Ferrars, Lucy confides in Elinor that she and Edward have been secretly engaged for four years, leaving Elinor devastated. Mrs Jennings invites Elinor and Marianne to spend some time with her in London, and Marianne hopes she will see Willoughby there. However, after she arrives, he does not visit or reply to her letters. Eventually, she spots Willoughby at a ball, but he barely acknowledges their acquaintance. Marianne later learns that he is engaged to the wealthy Miss Grey, and becomes inconsolable. Brandon calls on the Dashwoods and tells Elinor that Willoughby had seduced and then abandoned Brandon's young ward, Eliza Williams.

Mrs Ferrars learns of Edward's engagement to Lucy and threatens to disinherit him unless he calls it off, but Edward refuses. Brandon offers him a clerical living on his estate at Delaford, which Edward gladly accepts. While staying with Mrs Jennings' daughter Mrs Palmer on the return to Devonshire, Marianne goes walking in a storm and collapses. Brandon brings her back, and she falls seriously ill with a fever. During Marianne's recovery, Willoughby visits Elinor. He insists that he loved Marianne and intended to propose, but needed to marry a rich woman after his aunt disowned him upon learning about Eliza. When Marianne recovers, the sisters return home to the cottage and Marianne spends time at Delaford, eventually falling in love with Brandon.

Elinor learns that Lucy Steele has become Mrs Ferrars and assumes that Lucy and Edward have married. However, Edward arrives and explains that Lucy has married his younger brother Robert after Mrs Ferrars transferred Edward's inheritance to him. Edward then declares his love to Elinor and proposes. They marry, as do Marianne and Brandon.

== Cast ==
- Dominic Cooper as John Willoughby
- Charity Wakefield as Marianne Dashwood
- Hattie Morahan as Elinor Dashwood
- Janet McTeer as Mrs Dashwood
- Lucy Boynton as Margaret Dashwood
- David Morrissey as Colonel Brandon
- Linda Bassett as Mrs Jennings
- Mark Williams as Sir John Middleton
- Claire Skinner as Fanny Dashwood
- Rosanna Lavelle as Lady Middleton
- Dan Stevens as Edward Ferrars
- Jean Marsh as Mrs Ferrars
- Mark Gatiss as John Dashwood
- Anna Madeley as Lucy Steele
- Daisy Haggard as Anne Steele

== Production ==
=== Conception and adaptation ===
On 5 October 2005, a reporter for the BBC News revealed that writer Andrew Davies was planning to adapt Jane Austen's Sense and Sensibility into a major television drama due to be broadcast on the BBC in two years. Davies commented, "When they are great stories, you keep on coming back to them and doing them in different ways with different people at different lengths." Davies said that his script was in the early stages and that no actors had yet been cast. The writer later expressed his delight at adapting the novel during an interview with Paul Carey from the Western Mail, calling Austen his "favourite novelist". He also admitted that due to the acclaim he received for his adaptation of Pride and Prejudice, there was pressure on him to get Sense and Sensibility right. Davies later stated that the aim of the miniseries was to make viewers forget about Ang Lee's 1995 film adaptation of the novel.

The opening episode of Sense and Sensibility features the moment Willoughby seduces Eliza, who is still a schoolgirl. Davies told Carey and Claire Hill from the Western Mail that he wanted "to do justice" to Willoughby's back story, saying that it is "quite interesting and steamy stuff like a lot of underage sex that goes on and is just talked about. I want to put it on the screen." Davies elaborated on this further in an interview with The Independent's Peter Chapman, saying that the seduction and abandonment of a schoolgirl which features in the novel needed dramatising. He believed readers of the novel "hardly notice" the moment, which he felt was very important. The writer said that the series was "more overtly sexual" than previous adaptations of Austen's works and added, "The novel is as much about sex and money as social conventions." Davies also included a duel between Colonel Brandon and Willoughby in his screenplay, an event that was absent from Lee's film, but is mentioned in the original novel.

Davies said that Lee's film did not overcome "the problem of the guys who get the girls not seeming quite good enough", and set out to try to find a way of making them into heroes in his script. He said that Austen should have made the reader feel that Edward was worthy of Elinor and explained how Marianne falls in love with Colonel Brandon, after having her heart broken by Willoughby. The writer added more weight to the male roles, so they could be turned into stronger characters. Davies told Hill that the team "worked very hard" on the men. Brandon is seen rescuing people and doing a lot of fast horse riding, while Edward was given a wood-chopping scene where he vents his frustrations about his engagement. Davies also made the Dashwood sisters younger and "more vulnerable" than they were portrayed in Lee's film. Hattie Morahan, who portrayed Elinor in the drama, stated, "We are trying to play the story as it was written. In the novel the girls are 19 and 17, so these romantic relationships are real rites of passage for them."

=== Casting ===
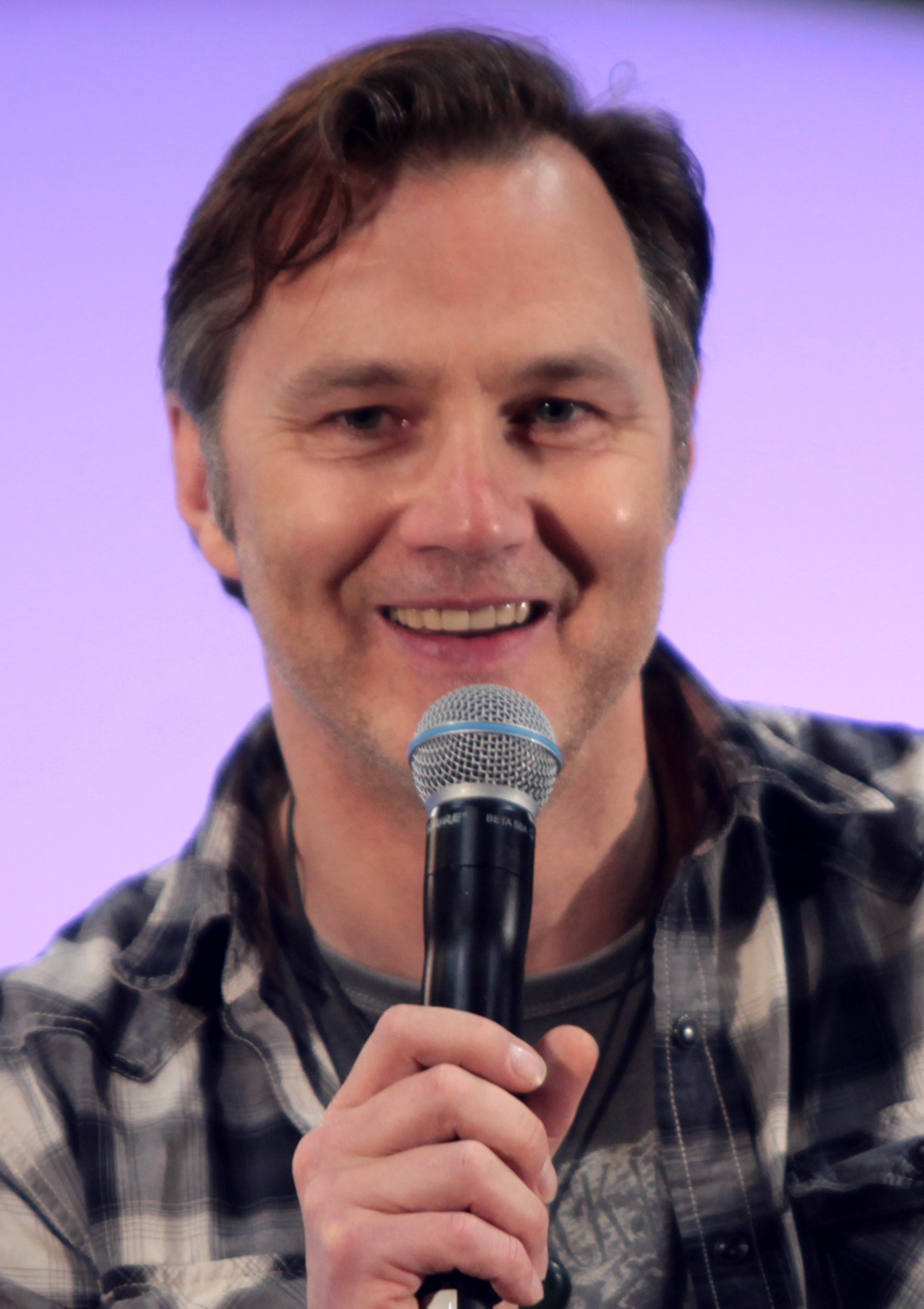
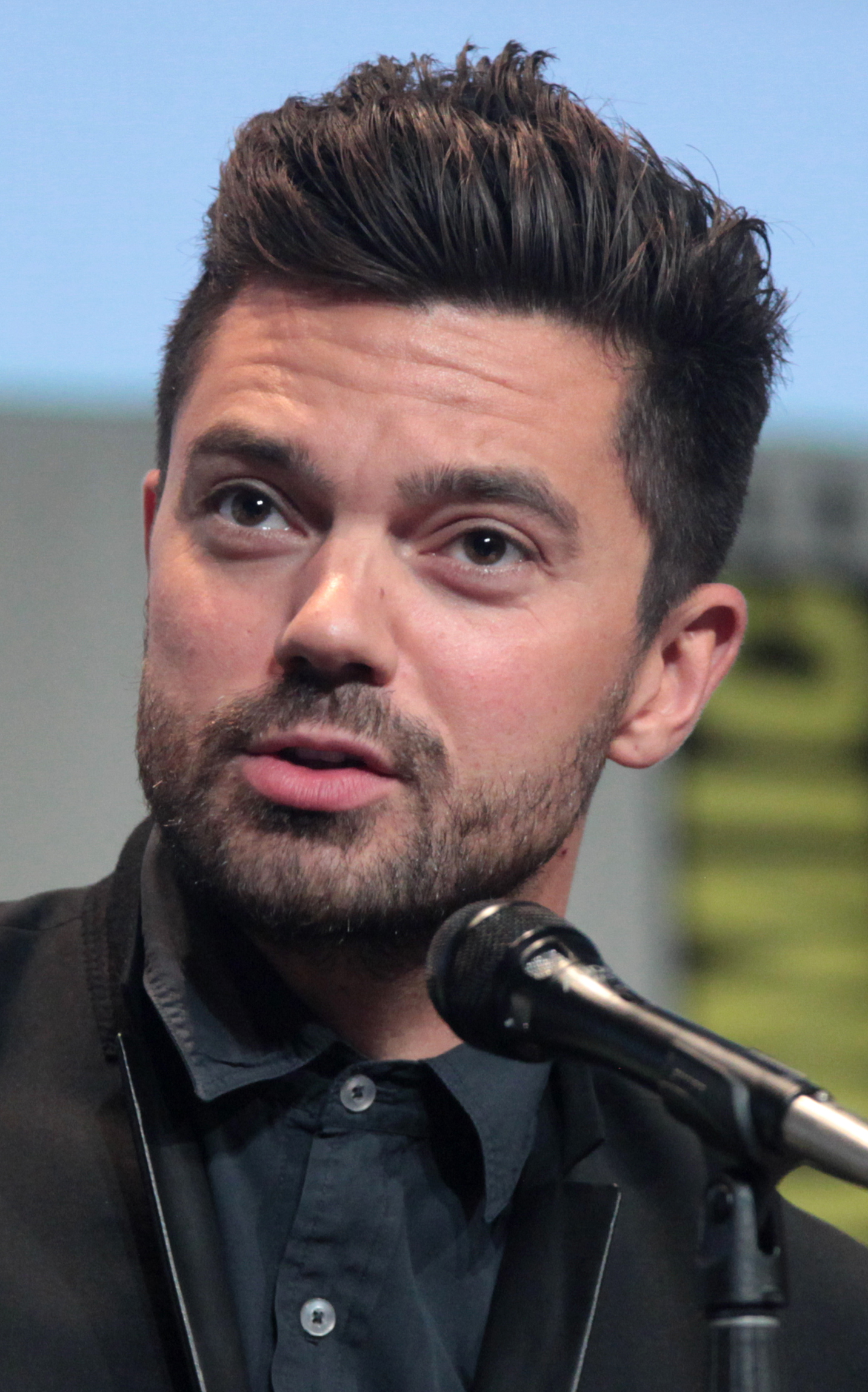
David Morrissey (left) and Dominic Cooper (right) portrayed Colonel Brandon and John Willoughby

Davies commented that he would have liked to have been in charge of the casting. He revealed that he had initially objected to Hattie Morahan being cast in the role of the eldest Dashwood sister, Elinor. However, he was glad that his objections were ignored, because he fell in love with her performance. Morahan told The Daily Telegraph's Jasper Rees that she deliberately chose not to watch the 1995 film adaptation of Sense and Sensibility or think about Emma Thompson's portrayal of the character. She said that she had not "because you would go mad. It would distort your work. I thought, it'll be original by virtue of the fact that it's me doing it and there is only one me."

Charity Wakefield successfully auditioned for the role of Marianne Dashwood. The actress said, "Marianne is the embodiment of youth and hope. I was so excited to be offered the part because I felt that it was a role which I could really attack. I understand her character and feel that we have lots in common." Dan Stevens was chosen to play Edward Ferrars, Elinor's love interest. The actor revealed to a BBC journalist that he had really wanted the part and was excited by the challenge of the character. Stevens became ill with tonsillitis during the shoot, and quipped that there are very few shots of him in full health still in the series.

David Morrissey portrayed Colonel Brandon. The actor was sent the script by his agent, and he initially questioned whether another Austen adaptation was needed. However, he then read the script and thought it was "just brilliant", especially as Davies had added more scenes featuring the male characters. Dominic Cooper took on the role of John Willoughby, Brandon's rival for Marianne's affections. Describing his character, Cooper said "The way I tried to persuade myself he wasn't too bad was that he's a 25-year-old young guy and he genuinely falls in love with Marianne – he's not just doing it for one moment in time." Cooper said that he had fun working on the project.

Janet McTeer and Lucy Boynton were cast as Mrs Dashwood and Margaret Dashwood respectively. Mark Gatiss portrayed John Dashwood. Claire Skinner received the role of John's wife, Fanny, while Mark Williams was cast as Sir John Middleton. Linda Bassett and Jean Marsh were given the roles of Mrs Jennings and Mrs Ferrars respectively. Robert Bianco from USA Today commented that both women were "wonderfully cast". Actresses Anna Madeley and Daisy Haggard portrayed Lucy Steele and her sister Anne, a character who was omitted from the 1995 film.

=== Filming ===
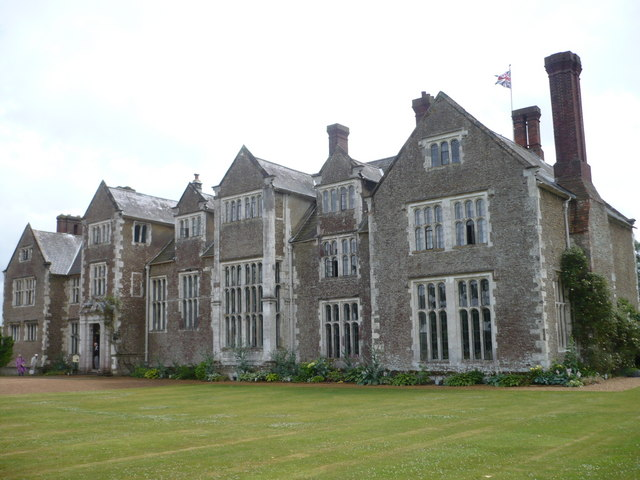
Loseley Park served as the exterior of Barton Park, home of the Middleton family.

Sense and Sensibility was shot entirely on location within England, mostly in the counties of Berkshire, Surrey, Buckinghamshire, and Devon. Filming began in April 2007 and lasted until early June. Blackpool Mill, a fifteenth-century cottage in north Devon, was turned into Barton Cottage, the home of the Dashwood girls. The art director for the series, James Merifield, had walked past the cottage in 2006 and thought it would be an ideal setting for a film. He was later sent back to the cottage by the location manager for Sense and Sensibility, and he decided the place would be right for the production. The owners of Blackpool Mill, Sir Hugh and Lady Stucley, were contacted in February 2007 by the BBC who inquired about the possibility of filming there. Caroline Gammell from The Daily Telegraph reported that "camera crews, production assistants, directors and actors swarmed over Blackpool Mill, turning the rustic four-bedroom home into the romantic hub of Jane Austen's novel. Set designers took the cottage more firmly into the 19th century, adding a porch at the front as well as dormer windows, fake shutters and an extra chimney." The interior of the cottage was "a little scruffy" for Mrs Dashwood's status, so scenes featuring the inside of the cottage were filmed in a studio. Filming took place at the cottage over eight days in May.

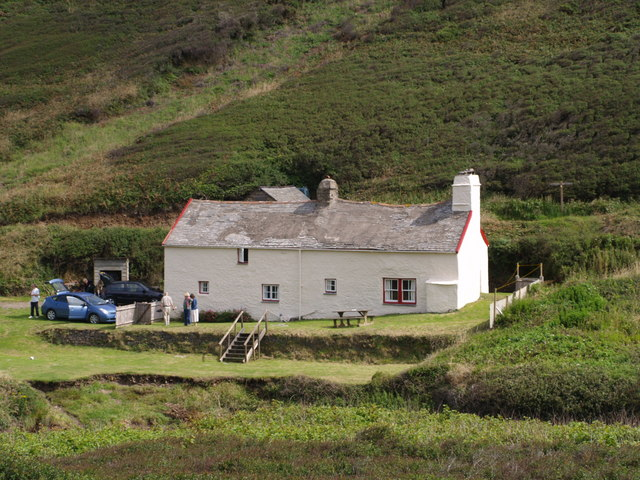
Blackpool Mill

Wakefield said that it rained constantly during filming, often soaking the cast and crew. The bad weather led to Davies writing in a scene featuring Edward in a wet shirt chopping logs in the rain, which rivalled the lake scene in Pride and Prejudice. Cooper told The Birmingham Post's Georgina Rodgers that the bad weather affected his first scene, in which Willoughby carries an injured Marianne home. He said that the scene was shot on a vertical slope with a rain machine, as the natural rain does not show up on camera. His cloak also kept getting caught under his foot, which made picking up Wakefield even harder. Cooper added, "I couldn't move and I just kept falling head over heels." Wrotham Park served as the exterior to Norland, the Dashwood family's home. Ham House in Richmond was used for Norland's interior shots, while the grounds were used for exterior scenes. The National Trust was asked not to cut the grass for several weeks before filming began. Ham House also doubled for Cleveland. Loseley Park was chosen for the exterior shots of Sir John Middleton's home, Barton Park. The library doubled for Colonel Brandon's own, while the entrance was used for scenes featuring a gathering of guests for a day out. The Oak Room was also used for the scenes involving Marianne, after she falls sick. Other filming locations included Dorney Court, Hall Barn, Lincoln's Inn and Clovelly Pier.

=== Costumes and make-up ===
The costume designer for Sense and Sensibility was Michele Clapton. She and assistant costume designer Alex Fordham undertook a large amount of research looking for inspiration. They spent hours looking at paintings and books from the time period, while also visiting art galleries and the Victoria and Albert Museum. During an interview for the drama's BBC Online website, Fordham revealed that they tried to find references from every area, including eighteenth-century cartoons. Clapton stated that the team wanted to make a lot of the costumes, rather than re-use what was already available from other productions. To get the sense of colour that they wanted, they had to dye and create a lot of the pieces. The wardrobe team worked closely with the make-up department and the production designer. After their first meeting, they came up with a colour palette for the whole show. Clapton chose to give Elinor and Marianne contrasting wardrobes. The "flighty" and "artistic" Marianne wears strong colours compared to Elinor, who has a different personality and complexion. Fordham revealed that with Marianne being younger and a "wild child", her wardrobe contains a lot of buttercup yellows, which suited Wakefield's complexion and her character's freshness.

Willoughby's wardrobe was designed to reflect his "poetic" and "fashionable" nature, while Fordham believed Edward was more suited to the eighteenth-century rural colours. With Colonel Brandon being a stronger character, his costumes were halfway between the two. His clothes were designed to be out of date and firm, using more heathers instead of the rural colours. The production had an emphasis on youth and passion, which Clapton incorporated into her work. The designer said, "Ten years ago, female characters in 19th-century dramas would all have their hair done in very precise ringlets, all neat and perfect just like in the portraits. Now we're trying to achieve a more believable, natural look, especially when the Dashwoods are at home." She added that the director had wanted the characters to "feel more human." Morrissey said that as soon as the cast rode horses or walked across fields they realised why the period costumes, which were "slightly uncomfortable" for modern life, were made the way they were. He added, "When you're dancing, they're quite restrictive, but that's quite good for posture – posture was different then, and that's important. But they give you a feel for the character which is really an advantage to you as an actor."

Karen Hartley-Thomas was the hair and make-up designer for the production. She began prepping a couple of months before filming began, and she met with the director and producer early on to discuss the whole look of the film. Like the costumers, she read books and went to art galleries during her research. The female characters in Sense and Sensibility wear a "no make-up look" because in the time period in which the film is set, only the lower classes would have worn white and pink make-up. The Dashwood sisters wore no mascara and only a little corrective and blush. Hartley-Thomas also used very little make-up on the men, as she does not like them looking made up. Discussing the hair, Hartley-Thomas said "Elinor's hair is always quite neat and done, where Marianne, being a freer character and more rebellious, she has lots of different looks and lots of wild looks with the hair loose." She also said that some of the male actors wore wigs because the men in those days would have had a lot more volume to their hair, whereas the modern styles tend to be shorter and clippered. John Dashwood and his son were given red hair, as Hartley-Thomas wanted them to stand out from the other male characters.

== Broadcast ==
Sense and Sensibility was aired in the UK in three parts, with the first shown on 1 January 2008. The other two episodes were broadcast on 6 and 13 January. The first episode of Sense and Sensibility became one of the top ten streamed programmes on the BBC iPlayer following its broadcast. In the United States, Sense and Sensibility was broadcast on PBS, as part of their Austen Masterpiece Theatre series. The drama was split into two episodes, which aired on 30 March and 6 April 2008. Sense and Sensibility began airing from 26 June 2008 on the UKTV channel in Australia.

=== Home media ===
Sense and Sensibility was released on a two-disc DVD in the UK on 14 January 2008. The Region 1 DVD was released a few days after its premiere on PBS. The two-disc set also included the BBC's Miss Austen Regrets, as well as commentary and interviews from the cast and crew.

== Reception ==
=== Ratings ===
The first episode of Sense and Sensibility attracted 5.54 million viewers upon its first broadcast in the United Kingdom, giving it twenty per cent of the audience share for its broadcast time. The second episode posted a small increase of 5.74 million viewers, while the concluding part attracted an audience of 6.76 million.

=== Critical response ===
Sense and Sensibility received mostly positive reviews from critics. Melinda Houston, writing for The Age, called Sense and Sensibility "a gorgeous adaptation of her most frivolous work" and added, "It's all beautifully made, beautifully cast, and the script snaps and crackles. Maybe Eleanor [sic] isn't quite as flawed as originally drawn but that's unlikely to detract from your enjoyment." Lenny Ann Low from The Sydney Morning Herald stated, "The locations, costumes and acting are excellent, with a particularly striking use of light – cold and grey skies foretelling doom through to rich candlelight signalling new passions." The New York Times critic Ginia Bellafante said, "There's nothing glaringly wrong with this new Sense and Sensibility, the last in Masterpiece's winter-long homage to Austen; it is both lush and tidy. But it alters the emotional chemistry, and the result is an adaptation that feels more arid than Mr. Lee's effort."

Nancy Banks-Smith from The Guardian called Sense and Sensibility "a charmingly domestic and spontaneous treatment of the story", adding that it had become "a younger sister" of Lee's 1995 film. Variety's Brian Lowry commented, "this latest Sense & Sensibility has done a splendid job casting its various roles, despite an inevitable wattage deficit compared with the most recent theatrical version. Davies and director John Alexander have also taken some liberties by crafting scenes of the men together (something Austen herself never did) – having the steely Brandon, for example, pull Willoughby aside to question his intentions toward Marianne. Featuring a top-drawer cast, the filmmakers create several delicate moments – from Willoughby's elegant seduction of Marianne to the stoic Elinor's pining for the elusive Edward who, as played by Stevens, adorably stammers in a Hugh Grant-like way."

Serena Davies from The Daily Telegraph praised the first episode, calling it "faithful to the spirit of the book" and stating that the series "deftly stepped out of the shadows of two formidable predecessors: Ang Lee's gorgeous 1995 film version of the novel, and scriptwriter Andrew Davies's own masterpiece, Pride and Prejudice." Davies enjoyed Morahan's "luminous" performance as Elinor, as well as Williams and Morrissey's turns as Sir John and Colonel Brandon respectively, although she thought the opening scene was "misconceived". Davies' colleague, James Walton, proclaimed, "In the end, this Sense and Sensibility was perhaps brilliantly competent rather than surpassingly brilliant. Nevertheless, it still proved easily good enough to get the costume-drama year off to a hugely enjoyable start."

=== Awards and nominations ===
The crew of Sense and Sensibility garnered several award nominations for their work on the drama. At the 14th Shanghai Television Festival, the series was nominated for Magnolia Award for Best Television Film or Miniseries, Alexander won the Best Television Film Director award, while Morahan won Best Performance by an Actress in a Television Film for her turn as Elinor Dashwood. Davies was nominated in the Writer's Award category at the 35th Broadcasting Press Guild Awards for his screenplay, and Clapton received a nomination for Outstanding Made for Television Movie or Miniseries at the 11th Costume Designers Guild Awards. For his work on the score, Phipps earned nominations for a BAFTA Television Craft Award for Best Original Television Music and a Creative Arts Emmy Award for Outstanding Music Composition for a Miniseries, Movie or Special. Cinematographer Sean Bobbitt was also nominated for an Emmy Award in the Cinematography for a Miniseries, Movie or Special category.

== See also ==
- Jane Austen in popular culture
