= Edward Ferrars =

- Sense and Sensibility character
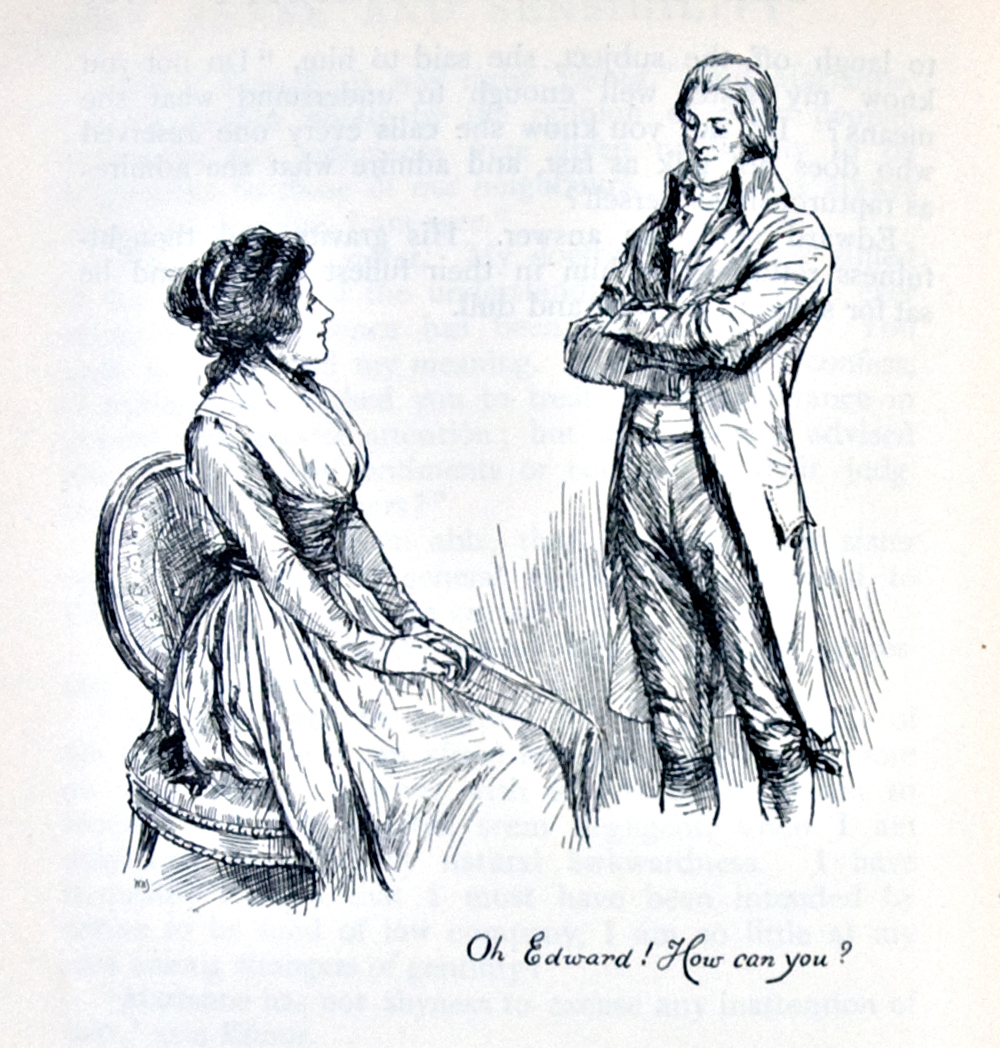

In-universe information
- Full name: Edward Ferrars
- Gender: Male
- Family: Late Mr. Ferrars, Mrs. Ferrars
- Relatives: Fanny Ferrars Dashwood, Robert Ferrars
- Home: Mainly in London with his mother; occasionally at Norland Park; the rest of the time in Oxford

Edward Ferrars is a fictional character in Jane Austen's 1811 novel Sense and Sensibility. He is the eldest in his family and forms an attachment to Elinor Dashwood, one of the novel's main protagonists.

Edward is first described in the novel as someone not immediately interesting or likable: reserved, a bit awkward, and not handsome. However, there is more to his character than initial impressions suggest: “When his natural shyness was overcome, his behavior gave every indication of an open, affectionate heart. His understanding was good, and education had given it solid improvement.” This first description of him also suggests that he lives under pressure from his family to become successful through some sort of vocation.

His personality lacks the charm of Marianne Dashwood’s initial love interest, John Willoughby, but indicates more personal strength. He exemplifies great loyalty when he sacrifices his potential happiness with Elinor to honor the engagement he made to another woman, Lucy Steele, when he was younger. He is a model of an honorable character under an unimpressive exterior. However, he is still often seen as less complex than Pride and Prejudice's Fitzwilliam Darcy or Emma's Mr. Knightley.

Out of honor, Edward refuses to break his engagement with Lucy Steele, and is disinherited by his mother as a result. However, Lucy abandons Edward for his brother, who becomes heir to the family property. This allows Edward and Elinor to marry.

== Perceptions of Character ==
Critical responses to Edward's character have varied. Scholars and critics have criticized him as unlikeable and not worthy of being an Austen hero. He is often described in negative terms, such as "dull," "timid," "dishonest," and "stiff." Several film adaptations have altered his portrayal to make his character more enjoyable or emphasize more appealing qualities. However, some scholars write that Edward’s character is misunderstood and that he does function in the novel as typical Austen heroes do. While his personality is unique, his actions show the moral integrity of other male protagonists.

Journalist Deborah Yaffe notes that Sense and Sensibility is a “contrast novel,” which is a feature important for understanding Edward’s character. The narrative explores moral differences by contrasting Elinor Dashwood’s “sense” with Marianne Dashwood’s “sensibility.” However, more commonly overlooked is the fact that the love interests of the novel, Edward and Willoughby, parallel this dynamic. Edward and Willoughby share similarities in age, a lack of responsibility, and uncertain financial situations, but they respond differently to personal crises. Edward upholds his engagement to Lucy Steele after it becomes public, even though he does not want to marry her, putting her well-being above his own. In contrast, when Willoughby becomes aware that he has gotten a young woman pregnant, he abandons her. The contrast between Edward and Willoughby distinguishes Edward’s morality.

The scholar Mary Watson has examined Edward’s development throughout the novel, making a case that the process of his development leads to him being overlooked. She writes that his development is primarily one in confidence, and categorizes the development in three stages. In the beginning of the novel, Edward sits in inaction; he makes no steps to end or advance his engagement. He feels the pressure of his family’s desires for him, but makes no move to achieve those, either. Following this, he moves to a phase of "compulsory action” as his engagement with Lucy is revealed and he has to make some choices. His final phase is a fully active one, in which he is freed from his engagement to Lucy and rushes to propose to Elinor. Edward exhibits development by the end of the novel, but for a majority of it, he does not assert himself. This makes him more readily overlooked, according to Watson.

While Edward’s character has been defended from the harshest critiques, his defenders still acknowledge his limitations. Though he functions as a hero, he is still a character who is often awkward or uncomfortable in interactions, and he achieves his hero status more through inaction than action (e.g., by keeping his engagement to Lucy). The variety of perceptions about Edward illustrate layers to his character.

== Notable portrayals ==
- Chetster Stratton in the 1950 NBC miniseries, directed by Delbert Mann.
- Robin Ellis in the 1971 BBC miniseries, directed by David Giles.
- Bosco Hogan in the 1985 BBC miniseries, directed by Rodney Bennet.
- Hugh Grant in the 1995 film adaptation, directed by Ang Lee.
- Ajith Kumar in the 2000 Tamil adaptation Kandukondain Kandukondain
- Dan Stevens in the 2008 BBC miniseries, directed by John Alexander.
- Nicholas D'Agosto as "Edward Ferris" in the 2011 film From Prada to Nada.
- Henry Devas in the 2013 BBC Radio 4 adaptation by Helen Edmundson.
- George MacKay in the 2026 film, directed by Georgia Oakley.
