= John Willoughby =

Fictional character by Jane Austen

- Sense and Sensibility character
- Dominic Cooper as John Willoughby in the 2008 BBC television serial, Sense and Sensibility.

In-universe information
- Gender: Male
- Spouse: Miss Sophia Grey
- Children: An illegitimate child, through Beth.
- Home: Combe Magna in Somersetshire, and occasionally Allenham in Devonshire

John Willoughby is a fictional character in Jane Austen's 1811 novel Sense and Sensibility. He is described as being a handsome young man with a small estate, but has expectations of inheriting his aunt's large estate. He is in love with Marianne Dashwood, who is also a character in the novel.

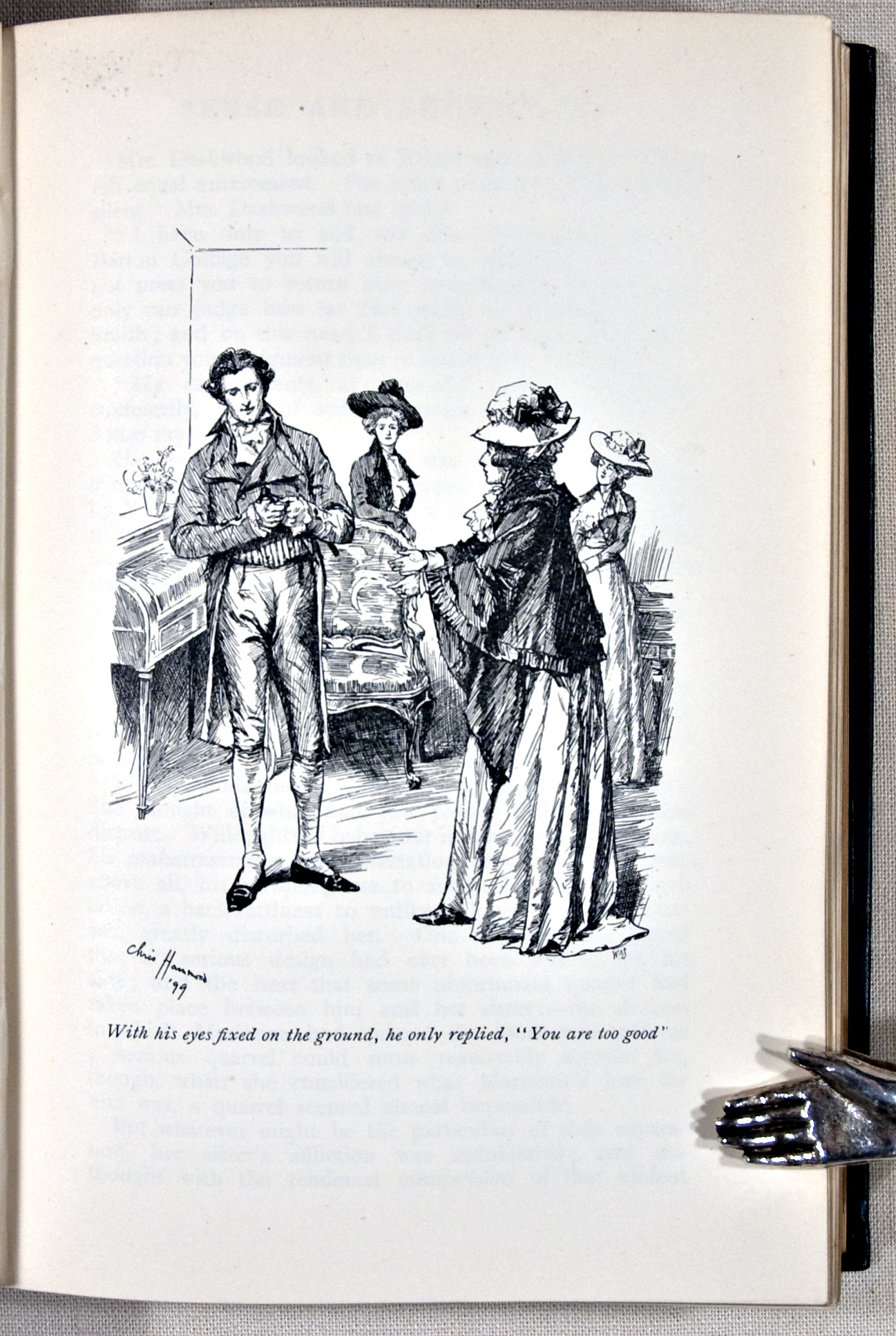
John Willoughby by Chris Hammond, 1899

== In Sense and Sensibility ==
=== First appearance ===
John Willoughby first appears in Sense and Sensibility when he rescues Marianne Dashwood after she falls down a hill and twists her ankle during a rainstorm. Because of this action, he is known as "Marianne's Preserver" by her younger sister, Margaret. After this, Marianne Dashwood falls in love with him.

=== Willoughby's sudden journey to London ===
Willoughby and Marianne obviously have strong sentiments of warmth and affection towards one another and everybody believes them to be clandestinely engaged. However, neither Marianne nor Willoughby hints at an engagement to anybody. One day, Willoughby asks to speak to Marianne in private. By the time he has finished, Marianne is in tears, and it seems that he is gravely disappointed. The reason given by Willoughby to explain this is that his aunt has sent him on a business trip to London, and he must obey instantly, and he might not ever return to Devonshire. Marianne's mother interprets this abrupt journey as it showing the intention of his aunt to dissolve any attachment between her nephew and Marianne, for Marianne has no dowry. Marianne's older sister Elinor suspiciously wonders why Willoughby would not say as much, but she does not doubt Willoughby's love for Marianne.

=== Willoughby and Marianne in London ===
Mrs. Jennings invites both Elinor and Marianne to stay in London with her during the winter, and Marianne, in hopes of reuniting with her beloved Willoughby, happily accepts; Elinor is only reluctantly persuaded after much entreaty and persuasion from her mother and Marianne. In London, Marianne improperly writes several letters to Willoughby, telling him that she had arrived in London and requesting him to come and visit her at the residence of Mrs. Jennings. Willoughby does not respond, throwing Marianne into despair. Elinor and Marianne then encounter him by chance at a cotillion and Marianne confronts him for not replying to her letters. Willoughby treats her very coldly and is obviously paying attention to another lady. This greatly upsets Marianne who has to be taken home early. The next day, Marianne receives a letter from Willoughby in which he informs her in very cold and distant terms that his affections have long been engaged elsewhere and he is sorry if she ever mistakenly thought otherwise. He also returns all her letters and the lock of hair that she had "so obligingly bestowed upon him". Marianne is thrown into utter despair. Elinor thinks that Willoughby has broken an engagement with Marianne, but she explains that they were never engaged. Elinor attempts in vain to afford Marianne some consolation, and tells her to think of her family and to exert herself through this difficult interval of sorrow. After the ball it is revealed that Mr. Willoughby is now engaged to a fashionable young woman named Miss Grey who has a fortune of £50,000.

=== Willoughby's scandal ===
Colonel Brandon, a friend of Elinor and Marianne, then explains the reason for Willoughby's abrupt change of heart. It turns out that Willoughby had seduced the Colonel's ward, Miss Beth Williams, then abandoned her though she was pregnant. Brandon finds her, but by doing so Willoughby's actions are revealed to the world. When his aunt learns of the scandal, she demands that he makes amends to her. When he refuses, she expels him from her estate and disinherits him, leaving him penniless and with many debts. It is at this point that he flees to London in search of a rich wife. Elinor subsequently tells Marianne about this in order that she see what a selfish person Willoughby is.

=== Marianne's illness ===
Marianne is so distressed by Willoughby's rejection that at Cleveland Park, on her way home with Elinor, she becomes sick with putrid fever. She is not expected to survive, but does pull through. Hearing of her illness, Willoughby visits the house. He speaks to Elinor and confesses he had been genuinely in love with Marianne and intended to ask her to marry him (but says nothing of the girl he seduced). But when the scandal broke and his aunt dismissed him from her favour, he felt he had to marry for money because of his penniless state and debts. Willoughby's punishment for his treatment of Marianne is to spend the rest of his life married to a woman he does not even like, and to know that his bad behaviour lost him the woman he did love. He elicits Elinor's pity because his choice has made him unhappy, but she is disgusted by the callous way in which he talks of Miss Williams and his own wife. His aunt, however, eventually forgives him, allowing him to return to Allenham, because of his marriage to Miss Grey. Nonetheless, he will forever be haunted by the loss of Marianne.

After her life-threatening illness, Marianne learns the errors of her previous belief that it is romantic to die of grief. She admits she could not have been happy with Willoughby's scandalous behaviour, even if he had stood by her. She learns to overcome her love for him and starts to appreciate the constant devotion of the honourable Colonel Brandon. Eventually they marry, despite their age difference (she is 17 and he is 35 when they first meet).

== Literary significance ==
Jane Austen created Willoughby as an antagonist driven by the need for his own pleasure, whether that be through amusing himself with whatever woman crossed his path, or via marrying in order to obtain wealth to fuel his profligate ways. He does not value emotional connection and is willing to give up his true love for more worldly objects. This characterisation is similar to that of George Wickham in Jane Austen's subsequent novel, Pride and Prejudice. They both have the charm to ingratiate themselves with people and to deceive them, as John Willoughby did to Marianne when apprising her of his journey to London, and George Wickham to Elizabeth by fabricating a story to demonstrate how much anguish he had experienced in his life. And they both show themselves willing to seduce and ruin women: Eliza Williams in Willoughby's case, and Lydia Bennet and Georgiana Darcy in Wickham's case. However, it appears that Willoughby is not completely without a conscience because he did express remorse and guilt concerning his actions toward Marianne, and showed himself to be capable of falling in love. In contrast, Wickham was very calculating in his behaviour and never demonstrated any regret regarding his treatment of Georgiana or Lydia, or embarrassment about his lies to Elizabeth.

== Notable portrayals ==
- Clive Francis in the 1971 BBC television serial scripted by Denis Constanduros and directed by David Giles
- Peter Woodward in the 1981 British television serial
- Greg Wise in the 1995 popular film, with Academy Award and a Golden Globe Award winning screenplay written by Emma Thompson, and directed by Ang Lee
- Abbas in the 2000 Tamil adaptation Kandukondain Kandukondain
- Dominic Cooper in the 2008 BBC television serial aired by PBS, directed by John Alexander
- Kuno Becker as "Rodrigo Fuentes" in the 2011 film From Prada to Nada
- Ben Lamb in Helen Edmundson's 2013 adaptation for BBC Radio 4
- Frank Dillane in the 2026 film
