= Elinor Dashwood =

Fictional character by Jane Austen

- Sense and Sensibility character
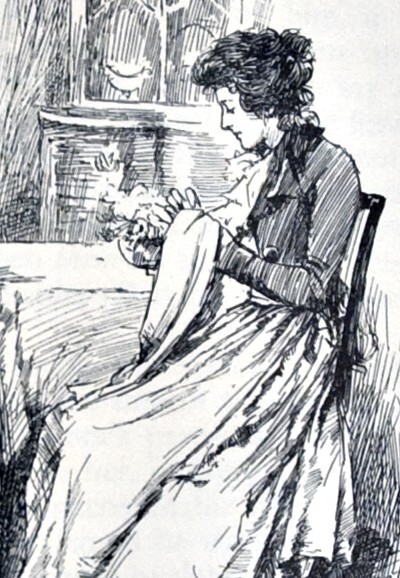

In-universe information
- Full name: Elinor Dashwood
- Gender: Female
- Family: Henry Dashwood and Mrs Dashwood
- Relatives: John Dashwood (half-brother); Marianne Dashwood (sister); Margaret Dashwood (sister)
- Home: Norland Park; Barton Cottage

Elinor Dashwood is a fictional character and the protagonist of Jane Austen's 1811 novel Sense and Sensibility.

In the novel, Austen analyses the conflict between the opposing temperaments of sense (logic, propriety, and thoughtfulness, as expressed in Austen's time by neo-classicists), and sensibility (emotion, passion, unthinking action, as expressed in Austen's time by romantics). In this conflict, Elinor, a reserved, practical, and thoughtful young woman who largely embodies the "sense" of the title, is juxtaposed with her younger sister Marianne who mostly embodies "sensibility".

== Description of her character ==
Elinor is described as possessing a coolness of judgement and strength of understanding which qualifies her to be her mother's frequent counsellor, and sometimes she shows more common sense than her mother, whose judgment is shown to be flawed by her exaggerated notions of romantic delicacy. Austen describes Elinor as "the comforter of others in her own distress, no less than theirs". Her mother is more often preoccupied with Marianne and her problems. Although Austen writes that Elinor's feelings are just as passionate and deep as Marianne's, she knows how to govern them better, as she is more aware of the demands which society makes upon women, and is more prepared to compromise.

The American scholar Susan Morgan called Elinor Dashwood the "moral center" of the novel, having "both deep affections and the willingness to control the desires of her own heart for the sake of the people she loves". As in other Austen novels, a central problem in the novel is that of knowing people, as people either do not reveal their true feelings and one's powers of observation could only be extended so far. Unlike her younger sister, Elinor knows that social conventions are to a certain extent dishonest as people engage in polite lies, and she does not take them at face value, giving her better judgement. Despite her reserved and self-disciplined nature, Elinor "feels more" than her sister. Though Elinor makes mistakes in judging people as with Mrs Jennings, her awareness of her own flaws allows her to learn from her mistakes. She is described as having a delicate complexion, regular features, and a remarkably pretty figure—although less striking than Marianne, more "correct"—which Elinor is more polite than Marianne, though her repugnance for vulgarity and selfishness is quite equal; and therefore she can "really love" the rather vulgar but good hearted Mrs Jennings, and be civil to people Marianne would be repulsed by—even people like Lucy Steele. Elinor's politeness not only reflects good manners, but also a concern for the feelings of others. Elinor says "my doctrine has never aimed at the subjection of understanding" and "it is my wish to be candid in my judgement of everybody". Elinor's concern with decorum reflects her understanding that politeness offers a way for others to become more understanding of her as she becomes more understanding of them. Unlike her sister, Elinor's way of understanding the world is based upon careful observation of the character of others, instead of fixed maxims or impulsive emotionism. Elinor is not a fixed character, but rather one who constantly evolves while remaining true to her values. Morgan argued that the key moment for Austen heroines is when they are able to think beyond their immediate concerns to view others with "disinterested sympathy" in order to see them as they really are. In this regard, Morgan argued that for Austen, the purpose of politeness when she created the character of Elinor Dashwood is not to enforce social norms, but as a way of understanding the world, to cover uncertainties and sudden vicissitudes which occur in life. Unlike Marianne who is devoted to the popular writers of the Romantic age like Sir Walter Scott and William Cowper, Elinor is not caught up in the enthusiasm for the Romantic writers and teases her sister for her love of William Gilpin, who promoted the cult of the "Picturesque", of seeking out beautiful landscapes to admire. Elinor finds her sister excessive in her love of the Romantic writers and believes that she is self-consciously modelling herself after a doomed Romantic heroine to her own demerit.

The British scholar Robert Irvine argued that popular dichotomy between the reserved Elinor vs. her more passionate sister Marianne is to a certain extent mistaken, for the two sisters have as much in common as divides them, with for instance, both the Dashwood sisters represent "feeling" against their selfish and greedy half-brother John. Irvine wrote the real divide between the Dashwood sisters is that Marianne favors the sort of openness she has with her family with outsiders whereas Elinor does not. At one point, Elinor draws a line between someone's ability to feel emotions, which are described in the novel as "the heart" vs. the ability to be presentable in polite society, saying "Though I think very well of Mrs Jennings' heart, she is not a woman whose society can afford us pleasure, or whose protection will give us consequence". Later, Elinor explains her values to Marianne as:

"My doctrine has never aimed at the subjection of the understanding. All I have ever attempted to influence has been the behavior...I am guilty, I confess, of having often wished you to treat our acquaintance in general with greater attention; but when have I advised you to adopt their sentiments or conform to their judgment in serious matters?"

Elinor criticizes Marianne for her "sincerity" not in itself, but rather because Marianne makes no effort to hide her feelings, despite the pain she sometimes causes others, which makes her "sincerity" a type of selflessness for Elinor. The novel described Elinor's character as: "She was stronger alone, and her own good sense so well supported her, that her firmness was as unshaken, her appearance of cheerfulness as invariable, as with regards and so fresh, it was possible for them to be". Irvine noted that if the similarities between the Dashwood sisters is sometimes overlooked by readers, it is because the novel is largely told from their viewpoint, which led Austen to highlight the differences to give her characters different voices. Irvine points out when Lady Middleton reflects on the Dashwood sisters, she sees them as more similar than different with the novel telling the reader that Lady Middleton thinks:

"Because they neither flattered herself nor her children, she could not believe them good-natured; and because they were fond of reading, she fancied them satirical: perhaps without exactly knowing what it was to be satirical; but that did not signify. It was censure in common use, and easily given".

Unlike the characters, the Dashwood sisters read much, which distinguishes them in a place like Barton Park, and neither is especially deferential to Lady Middleton, who does not understand what the term satirical actually means. Irvine also points out that both the Dashwood sisters share fundamentally the same values, which sets them in opposition to other characters, and it this very friendliness within the family that allows their differences to emerge within their conversations. At one point, the Dashwood sisters keep secrets from one another as Elinor hides Edward Ferrar's engagement to Lucy Steele from her sister while Marianne becomes too close to John Willoughby. After Edward's engagement becomes public, the narrator says that "confidence between them" [the Dashwood sisters] was "restored to its proper state". The book ends with the implication that the Dashwood sisters will remain closer to each other than their husbands as the narrator says:

"Between Barton and Delaford, there was that constant communication which strong family affection would naturally dictate;-and among the merits and the happiness of Elinor and Marianne, let it not be ranked as the least considerable, that though the sisters, and living almost within sight of each other, they could live without disagreement between themselves, or producing coolness between their husbands".

However, the novel tends to take Elinor's side and to describe events from her viewpoint more than it does Marianne's. Free indirect discourse is when a narrator summarizes what a character is thinking without the character speaking, and was often used by Austen to portray the workings of Elinor's mind. Austen used free indirect discourse in such way as to make the reader pay close attention to whatever statements in the novel were actually those of Elinor or the narrator, but overall leaves the reader with the impression that Elinor's views are the correct ones. Throughout the novel, Elinor subjects herself to relentless self-scrutiny and self-discipline, what she calls her "self-command", as to control her consciousness to accept only "certain thoughts and feelings". In the last chapters, Elinor turns her "self-command" onto Marianne and her mother, leading her to tell Marianne she is an example to be followed, with Marianne saying that from now on, "my feelings shall be governed". Irvine wrote that the novel never tells the reader what sort of books Elinor reads, but in the last chapters, Elinor's voice sounds remarkably like something out of the "conduct books" that set out the proper values for a young woman and were popular in the Regency England. Irvine noted that Austen did not entirely like "conduct books", and it is doubtful she wanted a character who in the last chapters talks like a "conduct book" character to be representing her values.

== Role in the plot of Sense and Sensibility ==
Following the death of Henry Dashwood, in the opening chapter, Elinor, Marianne, Margaret, and their mother are left nearly penniless by the machinations of the girls' selfish and greedy sister-in-law, Fanny. Though their father had asked John Dashwood, his son and the sisters' half-brother, to make sure the girls would be taken care of as their income would be low, he is swayed by his wife to give them nothing extra. As the sole son of Henry Dashwood (from a previous marriage), John Dashwood inherits their father's entire estate according to inheritance law.

Elinor falls in love with Edward Ferrars, Fanny's brother, while still residing in Norland Park. Her reduced circumstances and Edward's reticence in wooing her do not allow her to hope for an offer of marriage. After the girls move to Barton Cottage on their mother's relative's estate, Barton Park in Devon, the practical Elinor takes the initiative to make sure that they live within their means and do not overspend on luxuries.

She is shown to be compassionate and caring towards the older and grave Colonel Brandon, pitying the hopelessness of his love for Marianne. Elinor's calmness and cool demeanour allow her to endure Mrs Jennings' teasing over her mysterious suitor, with whom Elinor believes she has no chance of an attachment given the circumstances surrounding Edward Ferrars' inheritance and her lack of wealth. She also has to endure Lucy Steele's confession that she and Edward are secretly engaged. Elinor suppresses her feelings and does her best to convince Lucy that she feels nothing for Edward, but in turn becomes her confidante and must suffer listening to Lucy talk about the engagement on any occasion when they are solely in each other's company. She shows concern by the developing relationship between Marianne and Willoughby, thinking it impulsive for Marianne to be so open with her feelings and reckless about not obeying social conventions. She assumes that Marianne is secretly engaged to Willoughby and is shocked when Marianne says that this is not the case.

Elinor's role as sister is shown further when Willoughby rejects Marianne while she and Elinor are on a visit to London with Mrs Jennings, and later in the novel when Marianne nearly dies from a fever while at Cleveland.

Despite Elinor's sense, she ultimately shows her sensibility when she learns from Edward himself that Lucy has married his brother, Robert Ferrars. Though Edward is now relatively poor, having been shunned and disinherited by his mother for being secretly engaged to Lucy Steele, he has come to Barton Cottage to ask for Elinor's hand in marriage; this is possible because the friendship which bloomed between Elinor and Colonel Brandon had previously led to the colonel bestowing on Edward a living as a clergyman on his Delaford estate. Elinor accepts Edward's proposal and they are happily married by the end of the novel.

== Notable dramatic portrayals ==
- Madge Evans in 1950
- Joanna David in 1971
- Irene Richard in the 1981 British television serial
- Emma Thompson in the 1995 film adaptation
- Tabu in the 2000 Tamil film Kandukondain Kandukondain
- Hattie Morahan in the 2008 BBC serial adaptation
- Camilla Belle as "Nora Dominguez" in the 2011 modern adaption From Prada to Nada
- Amanda Hale in Helen Edmundson's 2013 BBC Radio 4 adaptation
- Sriti Jha in the 2014 television serial Kumkum Bhagya
- Daisy Edgar-Jones in the 2026 film adaptation
