= Colonel Brandon =

- Sense and Sensibility character
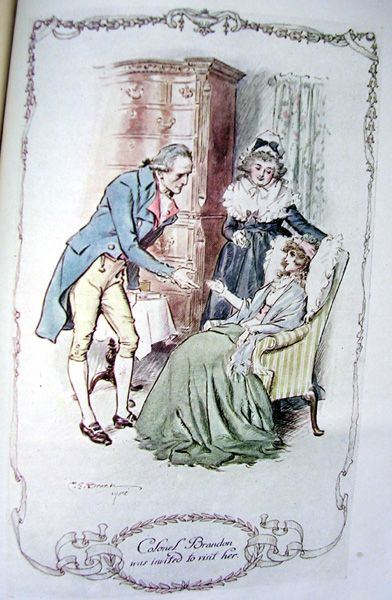
- Ch 46 of Sense and Sensibility, (Jane Austen Novel) engraving of Colonel Brandon calling to Marianne (coloured)

In-universe information
- Gender: Male
- Occupation: British Army colonel
- Family: Deceased
- Spouse: Marianne Dashwood
- Relatives: Elder brother (deceased); Sister (in Avignon)
- Home: Delaford
- Nationality: British

Colonel Brandon is a fictional character in Jane Austen's 1811 novel Sense and Sensibility.

A quiet and reserved man, he forms an attachment to the middle Dashwood sister, Marianne, whom he eventually marries happily.

== Background ==
The younger son of a landed family in Dorsetshire, Brandon made a career in the army, until at the death of his brother he inherited Delaford. We are told that at that point the estate was encumbered by debt, but it appears that at the time of the book's action they had all been resolved: “His property here, his place, his house, - everything in such respectable and excellent condition!”.

== Character ==
In terms of activities and life experience, Colonel Brandon is perhaps the most Byronic among Austen's leading men. He attempts to elope with his teenage cousin Eliza for whom he has a passionate attachment; he has the mortification of seeing her married-off for mercenary reasons to his elder brother at their father's behest; he serves his country abroad and returns to rescue the dying Eliza from a debtors' prison; he raises her illegitimate daughter, and fights a duel with her seducer; and he forms a second, passionate crush to another vibrant seventeen-year-old girl, Marianne - as she reminds him of his ex Eliza. His very name links him to the rake in Richardson's Pamela – Mr B. of Brandon Hall – and his experiences are in many ways a benign retelling (rescuer, not seducer) of the latter's life.

In social life and in courtship, the Colonel may be considered an uninteresting character. Unlike the traditional romantic suitor, the Colonel is melancholy, taciturn, cancels expeditions, intrudes at inconvenient moments, and speaks only to Elinor, not to Marianne. He is set up in opposition to John Willoughby – the latter having all the romantic trappings and ways of speaking, and marries for money; while the outwardly dull Colonel marries for love. Despite this, critical dissatisfaction with the starkness of the typology, and with the book's outcome, is pervasive. The Colonel seemed to lack appeal to the 20th-century reader, making his eventual success in wooing seem unlikely. For a figure closer to Jane Austen's time like Henry Austin Dobson, however, the marriage was a mark of her realism: “Every one does not get a Bingley or a Darcy (with a park); but...not a few enthusiasts like Marianne decline at last upon middle-aged colonels with flannel waistcoats”.

Some scholars have seen parallels between Colonel Brandon and Warren Hastings, the first Governor-General of India. Hastings had been rumoured to be the biological father of Eliza de Feuillide, who was Jane Austen's cousin. Linda Robinson Walker argues that Hastings "haunts Sense and Sensibility in the character of Colonel Brandon": both left for India at age seventeen; both may have had illegitimate daughters named Eliza; both participated in a duel.

== Notable portrayals ==
- Robert Swann in the 1981 TV mini-series, directed by Rodney Bennett.
- Alan Rickman in the 1995 film with Academy Award and a Golden Globe Award winning screenplay written by Emma Thompson, and directed by Ang Lee.
- Mammootty in the 2000 Tamil film Kandukondain Kandukondain, directed by Rajiv Menon.
- David Morrissey in the 2008 BBC television serial, aired by PBS in the United States, directed by John Alexander.
- Herbert Nordrum in the 2026 film, directed by Georgia Oakley.

== See also ==
- Age disparity in sexual relationships
- Clarissa
- Evelina
- Gretna Green
- The Courtship of Miles Standish
