= John Alexander (director) =

British television director

John Alexander is a British director of television drama who grew up in the East Durham Coal Field and joined the BBC as a post-graduate trainee. He produced a number of documentaries before directing drama. His works include Quirke, The 7.39, Sense and Sensibility, Small Island, Exile, One Child and Belgravia.

Small Island won an International Emmy for Best Mini-Series, and Sense and Sensibility won the Magnolia Best Director Prize at the Shanghai International Film Festival. Exile was BAFTA-nominated for Best Director Fiction and One Child was Royal Television Society-nominated for Best Director Fiction.
