= Frank Dillane =

British actor (born 1991)

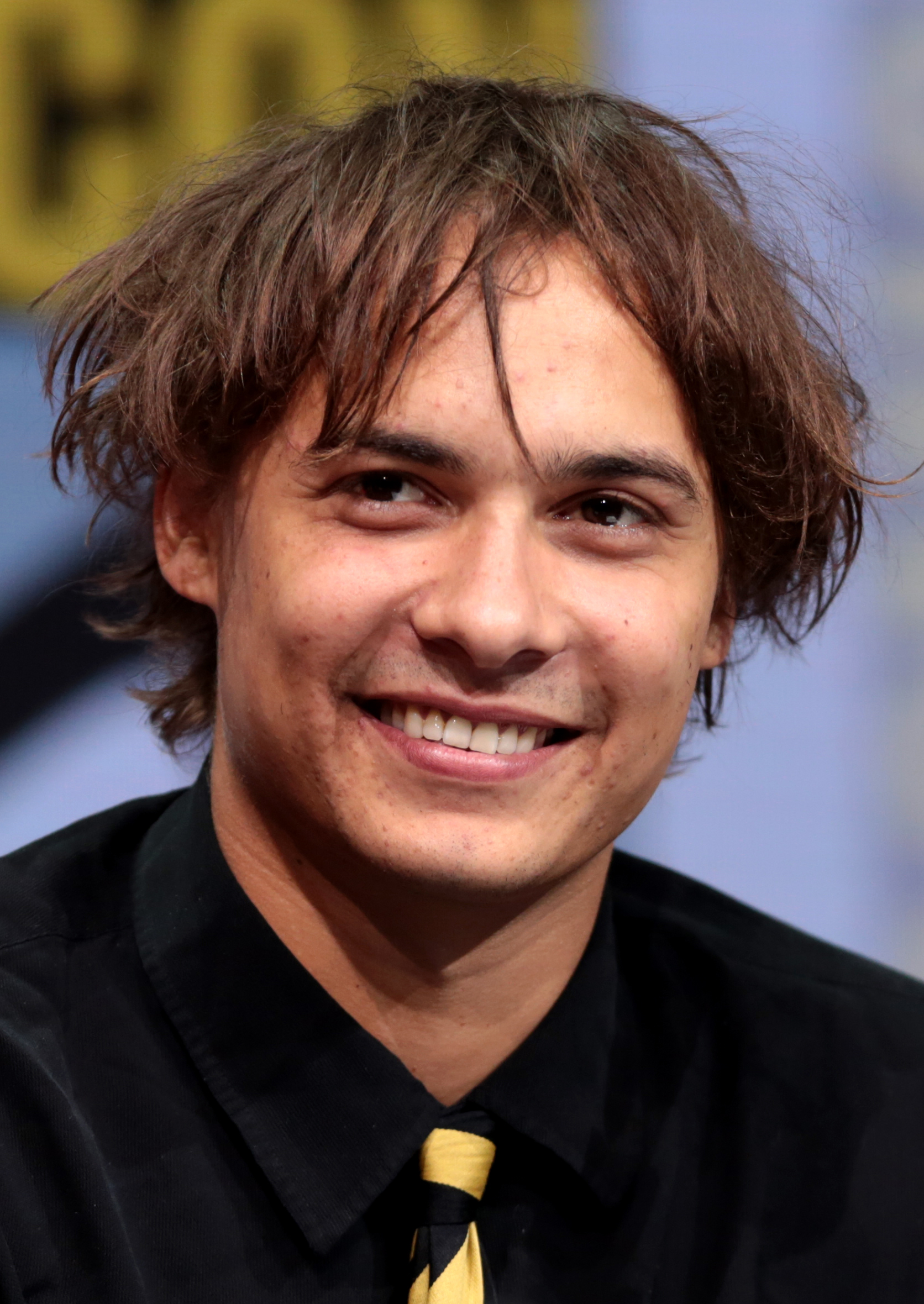
- Dillane at the 2017 San Diego Comic-Con
- Born: Frank Stephenson Dillane; 21 April 1991 (age 35); London, England
- Education: Royal Academy of Dramatic Art (BA)
- Occupation: Actor
- Years active: 1997–present
- Parents: Stephen Dillane (father); Naomi Wirthner (mother)
- Relatives: Richard Dillane (uncle)

Frank Stephenson Dillane (born 21 April 1991) is a British actor and musician. He is known for his roles as Nick Clark on Fear the Walking Dead (2015–2018) and 16-year-old Tom Riddle in the film Harry Potter and the Half-Blood Prince (2009). He also appeared as Henry Coffin in the film In the Heart of the Sea (2015). Dillane plays a recurring role in the 2022 gothic romance miniseries The Essex Serpent.

Dillane was the recipient of the 2025 Un Certain Regard Best Actor Award at Cannes for his portrayal of Mike in Urchin.

== Early life and family ==
Dillane was born in London, England. His father is actor Stephen Dillane. His paternal grandfather was born in Australia to Irish parents. His mother, Naomi Wirthner, is British-Jamaican; she manages a theatre company called The Barebones Project. His paternal uncle is actor Richard Dillane. He spent part of his childhood in Brixton, before moving to Forest Row in East Sussex.

After passing his A-level examinations, Dillane was accepted to the Royal Academy of Dramatic Art (RADA) and graduated in 2013, with a Bachelor of Arts in acting.

== Career ==
Dillane has acted in film, on stage, and on television. He made his film debut at his father's side as an extra in Welcome to Sarajevo (1997) when he was six years of age. He became more widely known when he portrayed Tom Riddle (a teenage Lord Voldemort) in Harry Potter and the Half-Blood Prince (2009).

Dillane played James Papadopoulos in the independent movie Papadopoulos & Sons (directed by Marcus Markou) in 2011. After Dillane was cast, his father decided to rearrange his own filming schedule to play Harry Papadopoulos (James' dad). Stephen Dillane declared it was rare to have the opportunity "to work with your children after they left home".

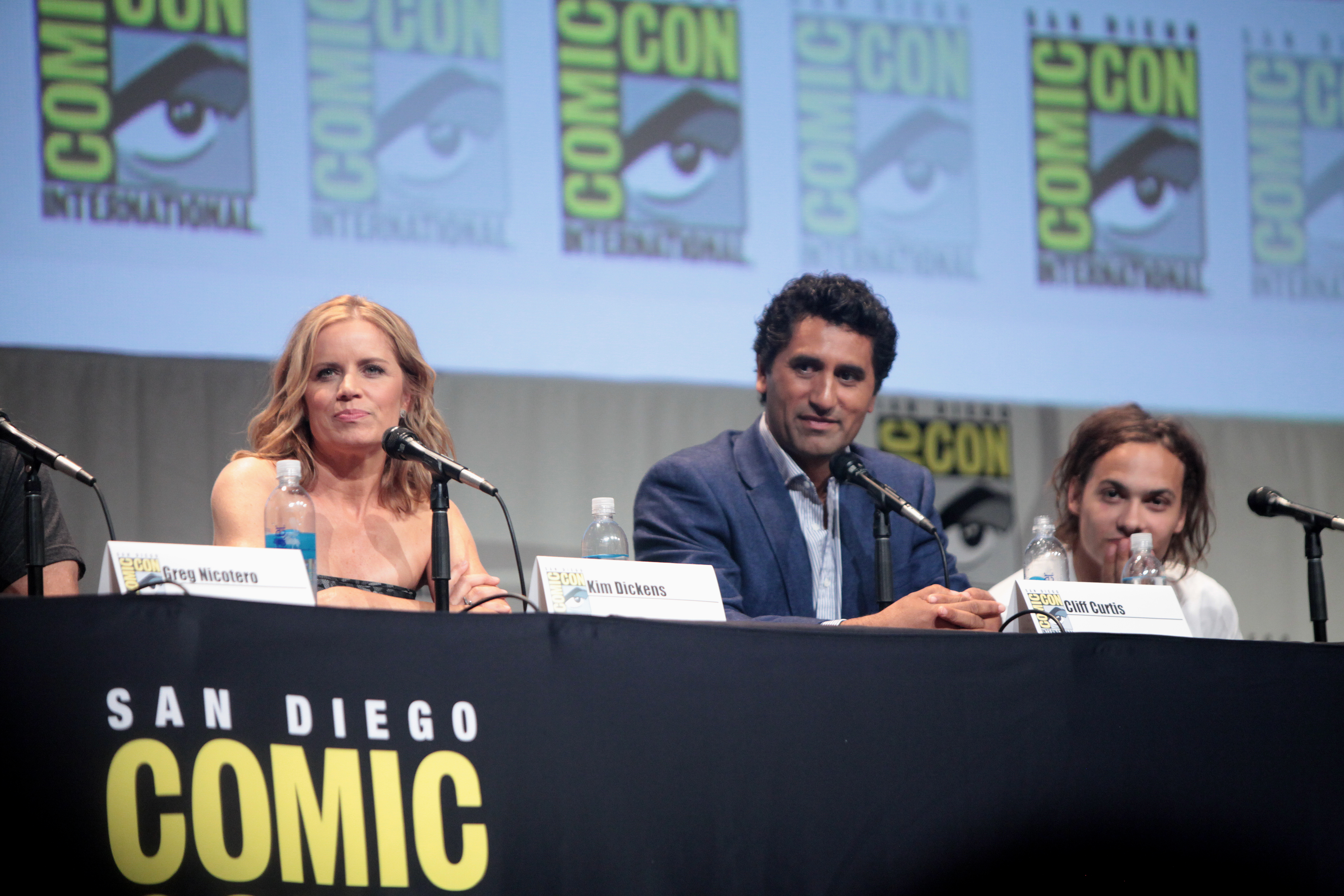
Kim Dickens, Cliff Curtis and Frank Dillane speaking at the 2015 San Diego Comic-Con, for Fear the Walking Dead.

In July 2013, Dillane played in Candida at Theatre Royal, Bath, directed by Simon Godwin. In 2014, he played the role of Keyes in Viena and the Fantomes, directed by Gerardo Naranjo; Dakota Fanning also starred in the film. Also in 2014, he was cast in a proposed adaptation of Peter Goldsworthy's best-selling novel Maestro, which was to be directed by Catherine Jarvis.

Dillane starred as Nick Clark, a "shaggy-haired recovering addict", in the horror drama series Fear the Walking Dead from its debut in 2015 until its fourth season. The role was a breakout role for Dillane, who was a fan favourite on the show. In 2016, he was nominated for a Saturn Award for Best Younger Actor in a Television Series for his work on Fear the Walking Dead.

He played Owen Coffin in In the Heart of the Sea (2015). This adventure-drama film directed by Ron Howard is based on Nathaniel Philbrick's non-fiction book of the same name about the sinking of the American whaling ship Essex in 1820, an event that inspired the novel Moby-Dick.

Dillane portrayed Shugs in the Netflix series Sense8, directed by the Wachowskis.

He appeared alongside Beanie Feldstein and Alfie Allen in How to Build a Girl (2019), directed by Coky Giedroyc.

In 2024, Dillane starred in the ITV serial drama Joan as Boisie Hannington, alongside Sophie Turner, portraying the lead role as diamond thief Joan Hannington.

The same year, Dillane starred in Harvest. The film premiered at the 81st Venice International Film Festival, where it competed for the Golden Lion.

In 2025, Dillane played the starring role in Harris Dickinson's feature film directorial debut, Urchin, winning Un Certain Regard for Best Actor at that year's Cannes Film Festival.

In 2026, Dillane starred as John Willoughby, love interest of Marianne Dashwood (Esmé Creed-Miles), in Focus Features and Working Title Films' new adaptation of Jane Austen’s Sense and Sensibility, from BAFTA nominated director Georgia Oakley (Little Bird, Blue Jean).

== Filmography ==
=== Film ===
Year	Title	Role	Notes
1997	Welcome to Sarajevo	Christopher Henderson	
2009	Harry Potter and the Half-Blood Prince	16-year-old Tom Riddle	
2012	Papadopoulos & Sons	James Papadopoulos	
2015	In the Heart of the Sea	Henry Coffin	
2018	Astral	Alex Harmann	
2019	How to Build a Girl	Tony Rich	
2020	Viena and the Fantomes	Keyes	
2024	Harvest	Master Jordan	
2025	Urchin	Mike	
2026	Sense and Sensibility	John Willoughby	
TBA	Fonda †	TBA	Filming

=== Television ===
Year	Title	Role	Notes
2015	Sense8	Shugs	3 episodes
2015–2018	Fear the Walking Dead	Nick Clark	Main role (seasons 1–4); 41 episodes
2016	Fear the Walking Dead: Flight 462	Nick Clark	Episode: "Part 16"
2021	The Girlfriend Experience	Christophe	8 episodes
2022	The Essex Serpent	Dr. Luke Garrett	Miniseries; 6 episodes
2024	Renegade Nell	Charles Devereux / Isambard Tulley	Main role; 8 episodes
2024	Joan	Boisie	6 episodes

== Awards and nominations ==
Year	Award	Category	Work	Result	Ref.
2016	Saturn Awards	Best Performance by a Younger Actor in a Television Series	Fear the Walking Dead	Nominated	
2025	Cannes Film Festival	Un Certain Regard for Best Actor	Urchin	Won	
