= Daisy Edgar-Jones =

British actress (born 1998)

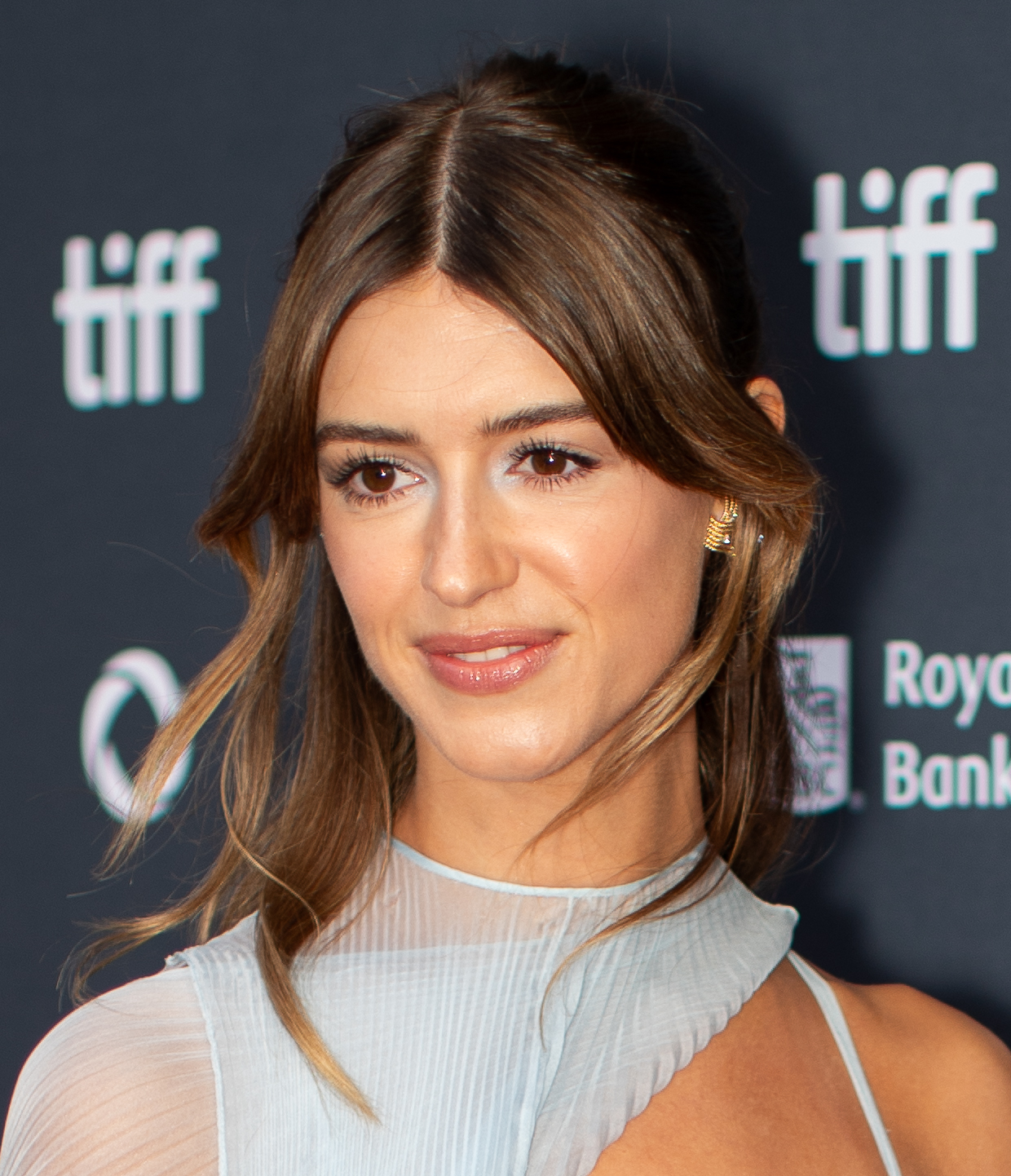
- Edgar-Jones in 2024
- Born: Daisy Jessica Edgar-Jones; 24 May 1998 (age 28); London, England
- Education: Open University
- Occupation: Actress
- Years active: 2015–present

Daisy Jessica Edgar-Jones (born 24 May 1998) is an English actress. She began her career with the television series Cold Feet (2016–2020) and War of the Worlds (2019–2021). She gained recognition for her starring role in the BBC / Hulu romantic drama limited series Normal People (2020), which earned her nominations for a British Academy Television Award and a Golden Globe Award.

She has expanded her career taking leading film roles in the horror-thriller Fresh (2022), the mystery Where the Crawdads Sing (2022), the disaster film Twisters (2024), the romantic drama On Swift Horses (2024), and the period romance Sense and Sensibility (2026). On television, she played a Mormon murder victim in the FX on Hulu crime miniseries Under the Banner of Heaven earning a second Golden Globe Award nomination.

On stage, she has acted on the West End stage in plays such as the adaptation of Mohsin Hamid's The Reluctant Fundamentalist (2017), and a revival of Tennessee Williams' Cat on a Hot Tin Roof (2024). She appeared on British Vogue's 2020 list of influential women.

== Early life and education ==
Edgar-Jones was born on 24 May 1998 in the borough of Islington, London. Her Northern Irish mother, Wendy, is a former drama film editor who now works in real estate. Her Scottish father, Philip, is director of Sky Arts and head of entertainment at Sky.

Edgar-Jones grew up in Muswell Hill, London, and first acted in a school play in Year 2. She attended The Mount School for Girls and Woodhouse College and was admitted to the National Youth Theatre. She studied with the Open University.

Edgar-Jones took ballet lessons until the age of seven, earning a Grade 1 certificate; she began going to ballet classes again in 2025.

== Career ==
=== 2016–2019: Theatre and television roles ===
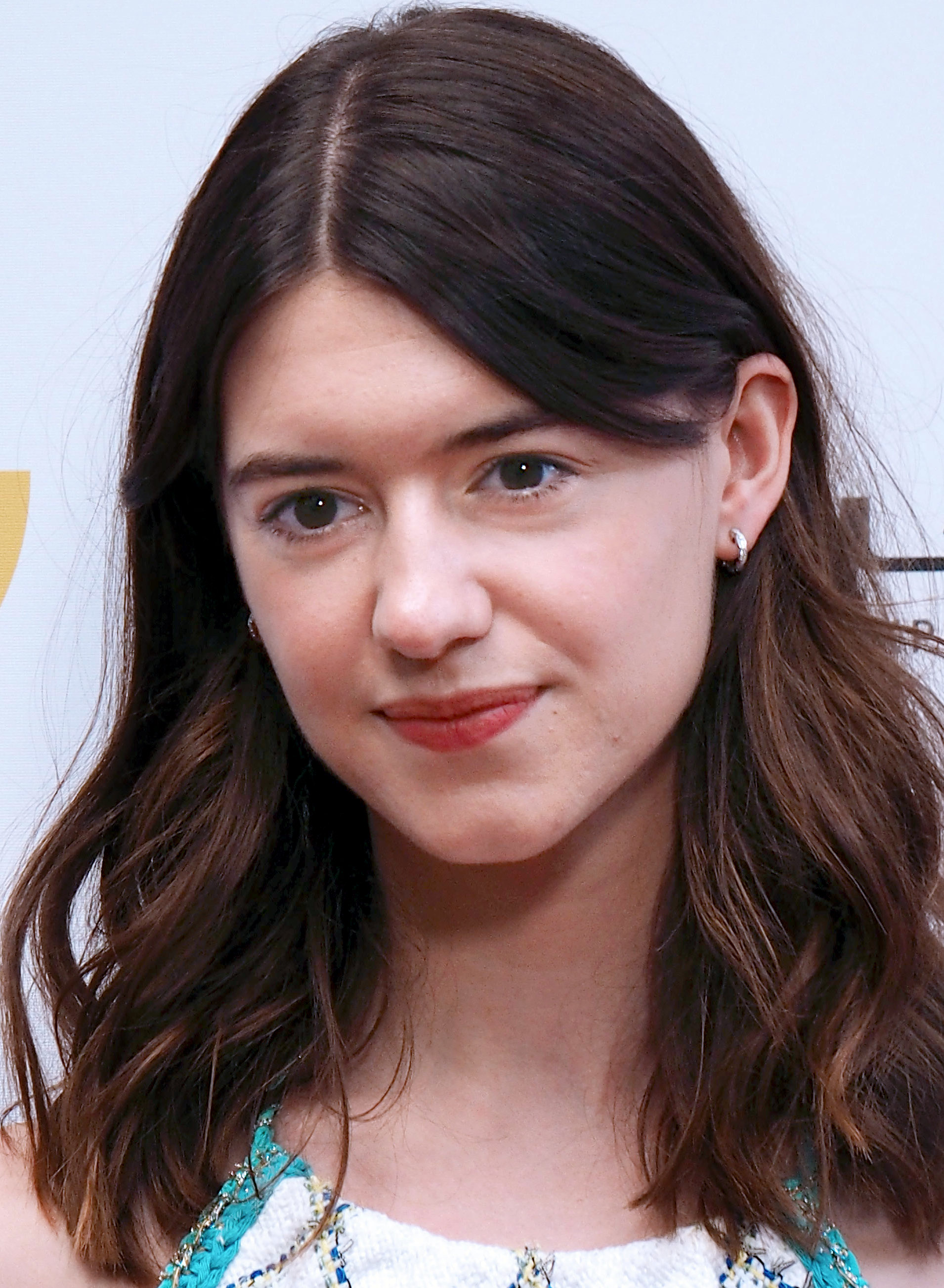
Edgar-Jones in 2021

After appearing in the 2016 Outnumbered Christmas Special on BBC One, at 17, Edgar-Jones was cast as Olivia Marsden in ITV's comedy drama Cold Feet alongside James Nesbitt. In 2018, she appeared as Jessica Timpson in Silent Witness, and in independent coming-of-age feature film Pond Life, directed by Bill Buckhurst. She was in the National Youth Theatre production of The Reluctant Fundamentalist. Edgar-Jones had a recurring role as Delia Rawson in 2019 BBC and HBO series Gentleman Jack. She played Emily Gresham for the first two seasons of War of the Worlds opposite Gabriel Byrne and Elizabeth McGovern.

=== 2020–present: Breakthrough and expansion ===
Edgar-Jones had been cast for the role of Jennifer "Jenny" in Indian-Telugu film RRR, however, she left the project in April 2019 citing personal reasons. In May 2019, it was announced that Edgar-Jones had been cast in the main role of Marianne alongside Paul Mescal as Connell in the Hulu and BBC Three series Normal People, an adaptation of the 2018 novel of the same name by Sally Rooney. Her performance was highlighted by critics, with Lucy Mangan of The Guardian writing that "Edgar-Jones captures all of Marianne’s intensity and acumen, her brittleness and damage". Jen Chaney of Vulture praised her chemistry with Mescal, writing that "Edgar-Jones and Mescal are called upon to delve into deeper wellsprings of trauma and both do so credibly, without succumbing to the temptation to oversell the drama". She was nominated for the Golden Globe Award, BAFTA Award, and Critics' Choice Award for Best Actress in a Limited Series.

Edgar-Jones starred in the February 2020 revival of Albion at the Almeida Theatre, which was recorded and later broadcast by the BBC that August. In her first post-Normal People project, she starred opposite Sebastian Stan in the thriller dark-comedy film Fresh, which premiered at the 2022 Sundance Film Festival. Natalia Winkleman of IndieWire wrote "Jones is an absorbing screen presence, taking a role that could’ve been played as dopey...inject[s] it with a quiet psychological intensity". Also in 2022, Edgar-Jones had the starring role in the film adaptation of Where the Crawdads Sing by Delia Owens. That same year she also starred alongside Andrew Garfield in Dustin Lance Black's FX on Hulu true crime miniseries Under the Banner of Heaven, an adaptation of Jon Krakauer's book of the same name. She was nominated for the Golden Globe Award for Best Supporting Actress – Series, Miniseries or Television Film.

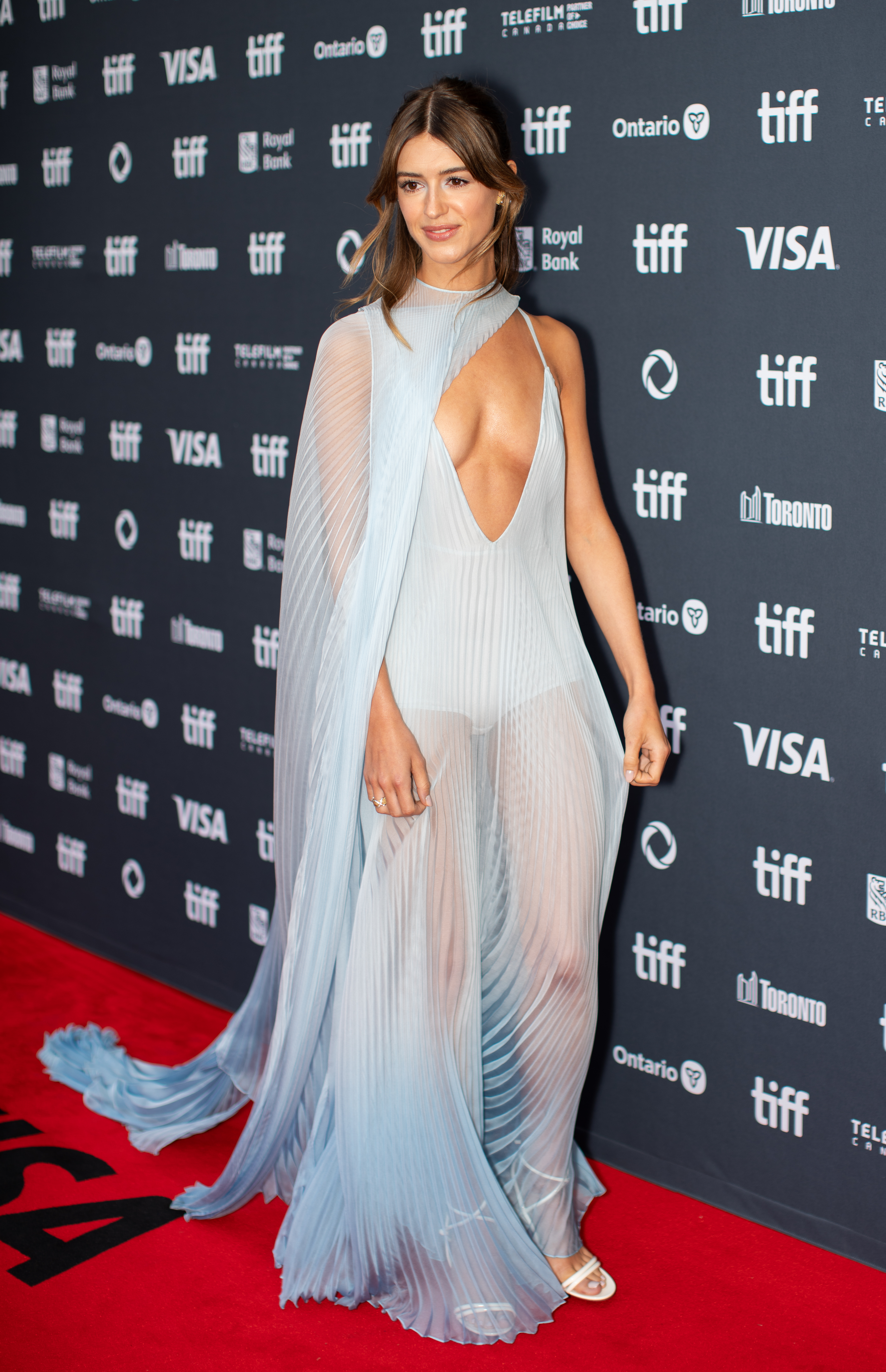
Edgar-Jones in 2024

In 2024, Edgar-Jones had her first big-budget film release with a starring role in the disaster film Twisters opposite Glen Powell, a standalone sequel to the 1996 film Twister. Jordan Hoffman of Entertainment Weekly praised the rapport and magnetism of its two leads Jones and Powell writing, "[They] do more than sell it; they make it compelling". That same year, she also starred in the period romantic drama On Swift Horses opposite Sasha Calle, Will Poulter, Jacob Elordi and Diego Calva, on which she was also credited as an executive producer. Jourdain Searles of The Hollywood Reporter described her role as "her meatiest role since Normal People" adding that she "gives an understated performance as Muriel, letting us get to know her through subtle gestures and expressions".

That same year, she returned to the stage, which included being part of the rotating cast of White Rabbit Red Rabbit by Nassim Soleimanpour at Soho Place on the West End. Later that year, she also acted opposite Kingsley Ben-Adir in the West End revival of the Tennessee Williams play Cat on a Hot Tin Roof, directed by Rebecca Frecknall at the Almeida Theater. Andrzej Lukowski of Time Out praised the performance by Edgar-Jones, declaring her "truly phenomenal" and adding that "she is so, so good, inhabiting Maggie with a burning, vivacious swagger, alternatively self-mocking, self-pitying, compassionate and vicious". In a mixed review, Arifa Akbar of The Guardian wrote that Edgar-Jones "is a convincingly catlike Maggie, but she is not a pleading seductress", observing that her "angry energy" made "her character untextured and invulnerable, the first act feeling too long, loud and not intimate enough".

In 2025, Edgar-Jones was cast in the thriller film A Place in Hell starring opposite Michelle Williams and Andrew Scott directed by Chloe Domont. That same year it was also announced that she would star in a Sense and Sensibility adaptation directed by Georgia Oakley, based on the novel of the same name by Jane Austen. Edgar-Jones would star as Elinor Dashwood alongside Esmé Creed-Miles as Marianne Dashwood. The film released in the US on 16 October 2026 and in the UK on 25 September 2026.

In January 2026, Edgar-Jones was announced as a Global Brand Ambassador for Estée Lauder, representing the brand’s skincare, makeup, and fragrance lines.

== Personal life ==
From 2018 to 2020, Edgar-Jones was in a relationship with her Pond Life costar Tom Varey. Since 2023, she has been dating photographer Ben Seed.

== Acting credits ==
Key
†	Denotes works that have not yet been released

=== Film ===
Year	Title	Role	Notes	Ref.
2018	Pond Life	Cassie		
2022	Fresh	Noa		
2022	Where the Crawdads Sing	Catherine "Kya" Clark		
2024	Twisters	Kate Carter		
2024	On Swift Horses	Muriel Edwards	Also executive producer	
2026	Sense and Sensibility	Elinor Dashwood		
2027	A Place in Hell †	Cate Fine	Post-production	
2027	The Take †	Rose	Post-production	
2027	Tomorrow, and Tomorrow, and Tomorrow †	Sadie Green	Announced	

=== Television ===
Year	Title	Role	Notes	Ref.
2016–2020	Cold Feet	Olivia Marsden	Recurring role; 27 episodes	
2016	Outnumbered	Kate	Television special	
2017	Silent Witness	Jessica Thompson	2 episodes	
2019	Gentleman Jack	Delia Rawson	2 episodes	
2019–2022	War of the Worlds	Emily Gresham	Main cast; 17 episodes	
2020	Normal People	Marianne Sheridan	Main cast; 12 episodes	
2022	Under the Banner of Heaven	Brenda Wright Lafferty	Main cast; 7 episodes	

=== Theatre ===
Year	Title	Role	Venue(s)	Ref.
2017	The Reluctant Fundamentalist	April	Yard Theatre, London	
2020	Albion	Zara	Almeida Theatre, London	
2024	White Rabbit Red Rabbit	Performer (one night only)	@sohoplace, London	
2024	Cat on a Hot Tin Roof	Maggie	Almeida Theatre, London	

== Awards and nominations ==
Year	Association	Category	Project	Result	Ref
2021	Golden Globe Awards	Best Actress – Miniseries or Television Film	Normal People	Nominated	
2021	Critics' Choice Television Awards	Best Actress in a Movie/Miniseries	Normal People	Nominated	
2021	AACTA International Awards	Best Actress in a Series	Normal People	Nominated	
2021	Broadcasting Press Guild Awards	Best Actress	Normal People	Nominated	
2021	RTS Programme Awards	Actor (Female)	Normal People	Nominated	
2021	British Academy Television Awards	Best Actress	Normal People	Nominated	
2022	Hollywood Critics Association Midseason Awards	Best Actress	Fresh	Nominated	
2022	Hollywood Critics Association TV Awards	Best Actress in a Streaming Limited or Anthology Series or Movie	Fresh	Nominated	
2022	Hollywood Critics Association TV Awards	Best Supporting Actress in a Streaming Limited or Anthology Series or Movie	Under the Banner of Heaven	Nominated	
2022	75th Locarno Film Festival	Leopard Club Award	—	Won	
2023	Golden Globe Awards	Best Supporting Actress – Television Limited Series/Motion Picture	Under the Banner of Heaven	Nominated	
