= Marianne Dashwood =

Fictional character by Jane Austen

- Sense and Sensibility character
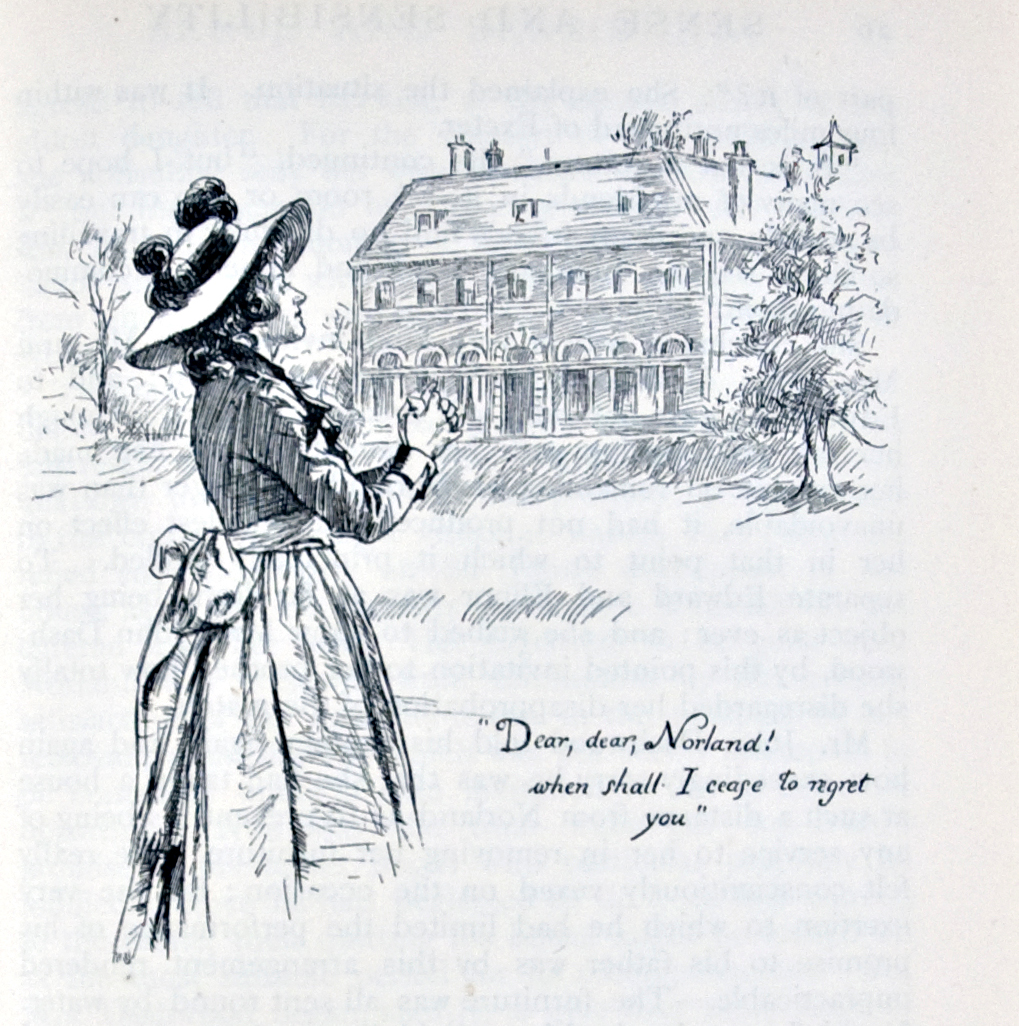

In-universe information
- Full name: Marianne Dashwood
- Gender: Female
- Family: Henry and Mrs Dashwood
- Spouse: Colonel Brandon
- Relatives: Elinor Dashwood; Margaret Dashwood; John Dashwood (half-brother)
- Home: Barton Cottage, after leaving Norland Park, the Dashwood family estate

Marianne Dashwood (eventually Marianne Brandon) is a fictional character in Jane Austen's 1811 novel Sense and Sensibility. The 16-year-old second daughter of Mr and Mrs Henry Dashwood, she mostly embodies the "sensibility" of the title, as opposed to her elder sister Elinor's "sense".

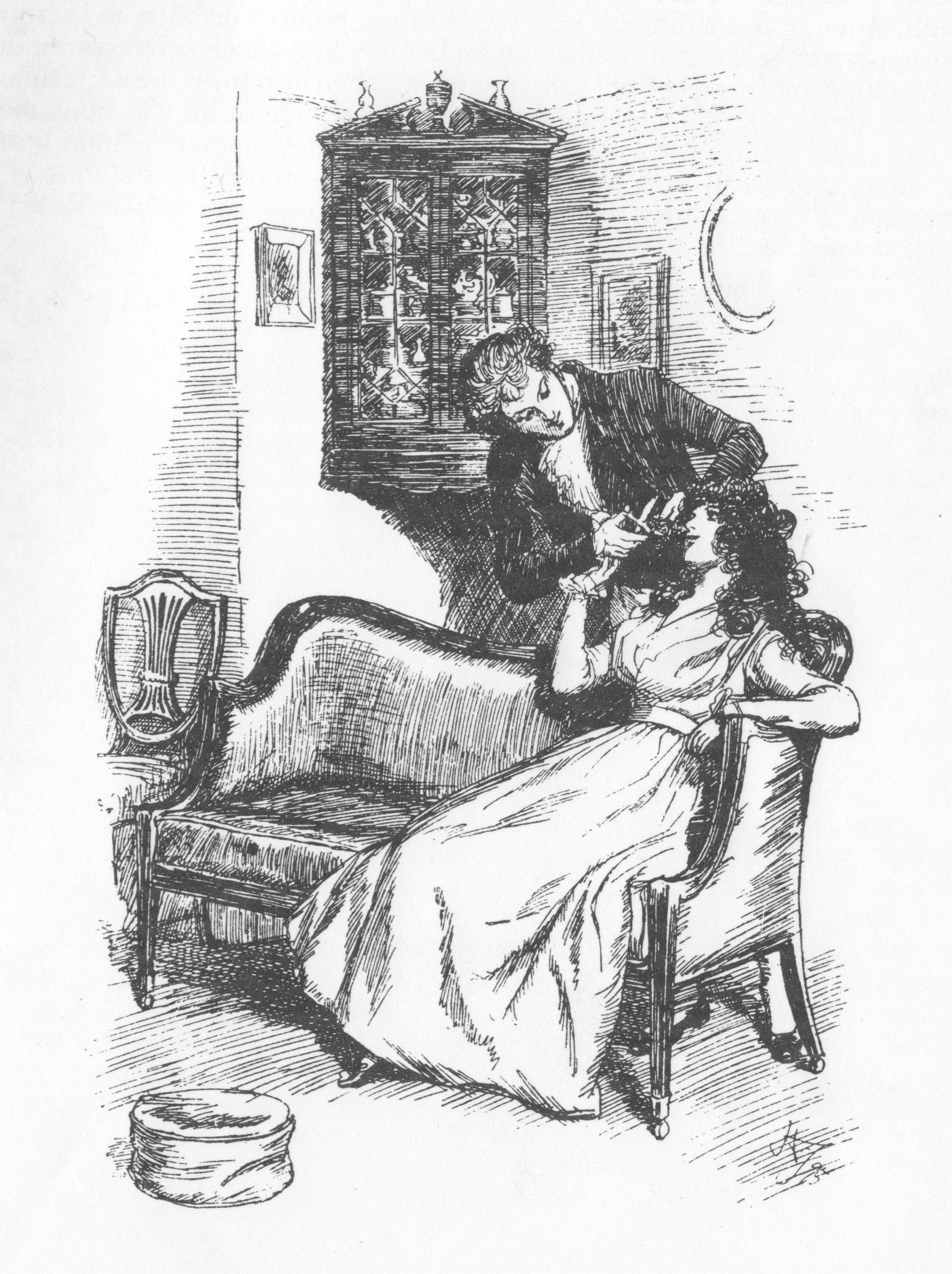
As seen in this 19th-century illustration, Marianne's joys, loves, and sorrows know no restraint, opposed to her sister Elinor's 'propriety.'

She embraces spontaneity, excessive sensibility, love of nature, and romantic idealism: Marianne weeps dramatically when their family must depart from "dear, dear Norland", and later in the book, exclaims, "Oh! with what transporting sensations have I formerly seen them fall! How have I delighted, as I walked, to see them driven in showers about me by the wind! What feelings have they, the season, the air altogether inspired! Now there is no one to regard them. They are seen only as a nuisance, swept hastily off, and driven as much as possible from the sight." At which the cooler Elinor replies quietly, "It is not everyone who has your passion for dead leaves." And later when she hears Sir John Middleton's account of John Willoughby, her eyes sparkle, and she says, "That is what I like; that is what a young man ought to be. Whatever be his pursuits, his eagerness in them should know no moderation, and leave him no sense of fatigue."

When Marianne is helped by the dashing Willoughby, she falls deeply and sincerely in love with him, abhorring all of society's conventions, and ignoring her sister's rational warnings that her impulsive behaviour leaves her open to gossip and innuendo. His painful spurning of her, and the shocking discovery of his dissipated character, finally causes her to recognise her misjudgment of him. She acts exactly as she feels, thus making herself and everyone around her miserable when Willoughby leaves her. This is in contrast to her sister, who keeps the secret of Edward's prior engagement to another in quiet, thoughtful composure.

Marianne treats her acquaintances in general with inattention and sometimes, contempt, recoiling from vulgarity, even when it is accompanied by good nature (such as with Mrs Jennings), treating her selfish half-brother and his snobbish wife with disgust, ignoring the grave Colonel Brandon because of his age and a former love, and making no attempt at civility to insipid Lady Middleton. The people she does love, however, she loves with warmth that leaps over all barriers—even barriers of propriety. Her sorrows, her joys, her antipathy and her love will have no moderation—no concealing. Marianne's form is "not so correct as her sister's", but "more striking", and her features are all good, her face is "lovely": her skin is very brown, but from its transparency, "her complexion was uncommonly brilliant", and in her eyes there is "a life, a spirit, an eagerness which could hardly be seen without delight".

Later in the novel, still grieving over having lost Willoughby, she ignores her health, falls dangerously ill with a putrid fever, and nearly dies as a result. But she does recover, and comes to see the error of her ways, hoping now to instead model her character on her elder sister. She eventually falls in love with Colonel Brandon and marries him.

== Notable portrayals ==
- Cloris Leachman in 1950
- Ciaran Madden in the 1971 British television serial.
- Tracey Childs in the 1981 British television serial.
- Kate Winslet in the 1995 popular film, with an Academy Award winning screenplay written by Emma Thompson, and directed by Ang Lee.
- Aishwarya Rai in the 2000 Tamil film Kandukondain Kandukondain
- Hilary Duff as "Tanzie Marchetta" in the 2006 modern adaptation Material Girls.
- Charity Wakefield in the 2008 BBC television serial aired by PBS, directed by John Alexander.
- Alexa Vega as "Mary Dominguez" in the 2011 modern adaptation From Prada to Nada.
- Olivia Hallinan in Helen Edmundson's adaptation for BBC Radio 4.
- Kate Hamill in the 2016 stage adaptation, which she also wrote.
- Chandelly Braz in the 2018 Brazilian telenovela Orgulho e Paixão.
- Esmé Creed-Miles in the 2026 film, directed by Georgia Oakley.
