= Pond Life (disambiguation) =

Pond life is an umbrella term for all life forms found in ponds.

Pond Life may also refer to:

- Pond Life (Doctor Who), a 2012 series of five mini-episodes of Doctor Who
- Pond Life (play), a 1992 play by Richard Cameron
- Pond Life (film), a 2018 adaptation of Cameron's play
- Pond Life (TV series), a 1996–2000 British animated series
- Pondlife, British DJs who released the 2005 single "Ring Ding Ding"
