= Angus Imrie =

British actor (born 1994)

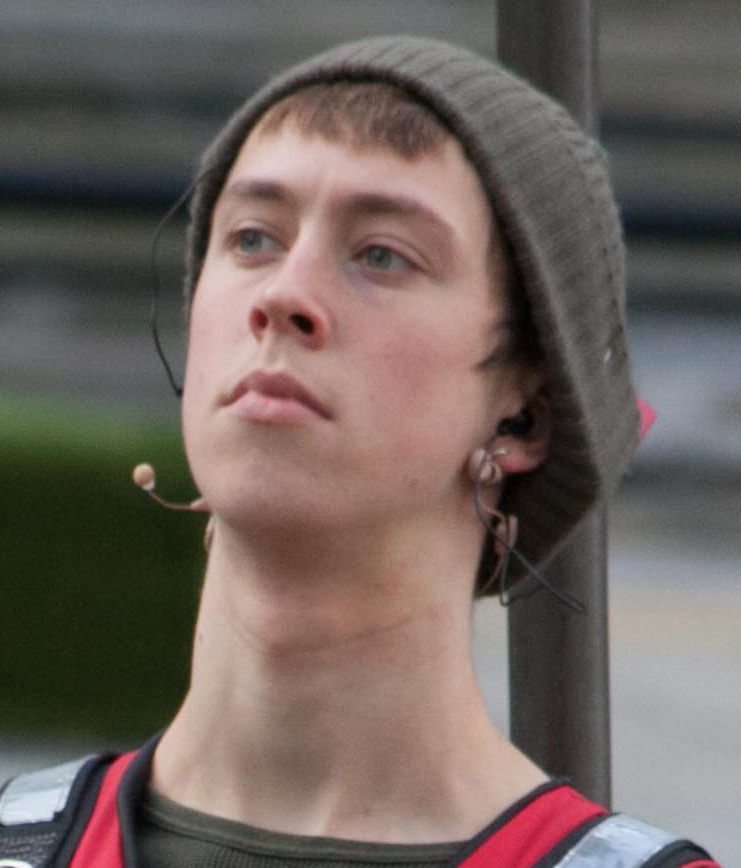
- Imrie in 2014
- Born: Angus William Jake Imrie; 2 August 1994 (age 32); Isle of Wight, England
- Education: University of Warwick; London Academy of Music and Dramatic Art
- Occupation: Actor
- Years active: 1999–present
- Children: 1
- Parents: Benjamin Whitrow (father); Celia Imrie (mother)

Angus William Jake Imrie (born 2 August 1994) is a British actor. He is known for playing the character Josh Archer in BBC Radio 4's long-running drama serial The Archers. In 2014, he won the casting agency Spotlight's Most Promising Actor Award at The Sunday Times's National Student Drama Festival. The son of the actors Celia Imrie and Benjamin Whitrow, he made his screen debut in the BBC film drama Station Jim, at the age of five.

== Early life and education ==
Imrie was born on 2 August 1994 on the Isle of Wight, the son of actors Celia Imrie and Benjamin Whitrow.

From 2001 to 2012, Imrie was educated at Dulwich College, a boarding and day independent school for boys in the south London suburb of Dulwich, followed by the University of Warwick, where he studied English Literature and Theatre Studies. From 2015 to 2017, he studied at the London Academy of Music and Dramatic Art (LAMDA) in London.

== Career ==
Imrie has appeared in a range of stage, television and radio productions since he was a child. After his screen debut in the BBC One film drama Station Jim at the age of five, he appeared in the ITV drama series Kingdom in 2007, and the BBC One mini-series Restless in 2012. In the same year, he appeared in the BBC Two drama series The Hollow Crown, whilst in the following year, he appeared in the BBC One series Father Brown. Prior to attending LAMDA (2015–2017), he appeared at Shakespeare's Globe in London, playing Bagot in William Shakespeare's play Richard II (1595) and Ned Spiggett in Jessica Swale's play Nell Gwynn (2015). He has also appeared in a range of radio productions, including The Treasure Seekers, Charles Dickens' Great Expectations and John Mortimer's A Voyage Round My Father.

In 2014, Imrie joined the cast of the long-running BBC Radio 4 series The Archers, based on a rural farming community in the fictional village of Ambridge, to take the role of Josh Archer previously played by child actor Cian Cheesbrough, the teenage son of David and Ruth and one of the main members of the Archer family. In the same year, he played the part of cabin boy Pip in The White Whale at Leeds Dock.

In 2019, Imrie co-starred in the Joe Cornish–directed The Kid Who Would Be King as the young Merlin, with Patrick Stewart portraying Merlin's older self. He also starred in the independent feature Pond Life alongside Esmé Creed-Miles; the film was produced by Dominic Dromgoole, who is the former artistic director of the Globe. Between 2021 and 2024, Imrie voiced Zero, a main character on the Paramount+/Nickelodeon animated series Star Trek: Prodigy.

== Personal life ==
Imrie resides in Oxford. His first child was born in 2018.

== Filmography ==
=== Television ===
Year	Title	Role	Notes
2007	Kingdom	Scott Millington	Episode 3
2012	Restless	Student	Miniseries
2012	The Hollow Crown	Edmund Plantagenet	Episode: "The Wars of the Roses – Henry VI Part II"
2013	Father Brown	Jago Pryde	Episode: "Pride of the Prydes"
2015	Station Jim	Schoolboy	
2019	The Spanish Princess	Arthur Tudor, Prince of Wales	Miniseries
2019	Fleabag	Jake	2 episodes
2020	The Crown	Prince Edward	Season 4
2020	Industry	Digdog	1 episode
2021	War of the Worlds	Dylan	Season 2, episode 6
2021–2024	Star Trek: Prodigy	Zero (voice)	Main role
2022	We Hunt Together	Henry	Season 2, 6 episodes
2022	Doc Martin	Max Foreman	Series 10; Episode 2
2024	The Serpent Queen	Henry IV	Season 2
2024	The Road Trip	Rodney	Main role
2025	Man vs Baby	Soren	2 episodes

=== Film ===
Key
†	Denotes films that have not yet been released

Year	Title	Role	Notes
2018	Pond Life	Malcolm	
2019	The Kid Who Would Be King	Young Merlin	
2020	Emma	Bartholomew	
2021	Back to the Outback	Nigel (voice)	
2025	Mickey 17	Shrimp Eyes	
2026	Ink	Beverley Goodway	
2026	Artificial †	TBA	Post-production
TBA	Fog City †	Martin Hargrove	Filming

=== Video games ===
Year	Title	Role	Notes
2022	Star Trek Prodigy: Supernova	Zero (voice)	

=== Web series ===
Year	Title	Role	Notes
2023	Star Trek: Very Short Treks	Zero (voice)	Episode: "Holograms All the Way Down"

== Theatre ==
Title	Role	Theatre	Notes
The White Whale	Pip	Leeds Dock	Open-air staging of an adaptation of Herman Melville's Moby Dick, written by the award-winning playwright James Phillips
Road	Brink/Skin-Lad, Blowpipe, Soldier, Father's voice, and Barry	Warwick Arts Centre at the University of Warwick	A Warwick University Drama Society production, staged in 2014, of Jim Cartwright's multiple award-winning play, first staged in 1986 at the Royal Court Theatre in London. It is set in an anonymous road in a deprived, working class area of Lancashire during the Thatcher era, at a time of high unemployment in Northern England. Imrie won the casting agency Spotlight's Most Promising Actor Award for his roles in the play at The Sunday Times' National Student Drama Festival in 2014.
Richard II	Bagot	Shakespeare's Globe	Part of the Globe's "Justice and Mercy" season (2015)
Nell Gwynn	Ned Spigett	Shakespeare's Globe	Part of the Globe's "Justice and Mercy" season (2015)
As You Like It	Jaques	POSK Theatre	
The Cherry Orchard	Trofimov	LAMDA Linbury Studio	
Uncle Vanya	Vanya	LAMDA	
Pogo (A Punk's Progress)	Various	LAMDA	
The Rivals	Jack Absolute	LAMDA	
'Tis Pity She's a Whore	Giovanni	LAMDA	
Motortown	Lee	LAMDA	

=== Rehearsed readings ===
Title	Role	Theatre	Director
Nell	Waiter	Red Handed Theatre Company, London	Jessica Swale
The Piper	Zum	Finborough Theatre, London	Fidelis Morgan

== Radio ==
Title	Notes	Role
The Archers	Recurring	Josh Archer
Buddenbrooks	Single drama	Tom Buddenbrook
People in Cars	Single drama	Ben
A Voyage Round My Father	Single drama	Young son
Great Expectations	Main role	Pip
Whoosh!!	Single drama	Angus
The Treasure Seekers	Main role	Oswald
