= London Film Critics Circle Awards 2013 =

British film awards ceremony

34th London Film Critics Circle Awards

2 February 2014

Film of the Year:
12 Years a Slave

British Film of the Year:
The Selfish Giant

The 34th London Film Critics' Circle Awards, honouring the best in film for 2013, were announced by the London Film Critics' Circle on 2 February 2014.

== Winners and nominees ==
Winners are listed first and highlighted with boldface.

=== Film of the Year ===
12 Years a Slave

- Blue Is the Warmest Colour
- Blue Jasmine
- Frances Ha
- Gravity
- The Great Beauty
- Her
- Inside Llewyn Davis
- Nebraska
- The Wolf of Wall Street

=== British Film of the Year ===
The Selfish Giant

- A Field in England
- Filth
- Philomena
- Rush

=== Foreign Language Film of the Year ===
Blue Is the Warmest Colour

- Caesar Must Die
- Gloria
- The Great Beauty
- A Hijacking

=== Documentary of the Year ===
The Act of Killing

- Beware of Mr. Baker
- Leviathan
- Stories We Tell
- We Steal Secrets: The Story of WikiLeaks

=== Director of the Year ===
Alfonso Cuarón – Gravity

- Paul Greengrass – Captain Phillips
- Steve McQueen – 12 Years a Slave
- Paolo Sorrentino – The Great Beauty
- Martin Scorsese – The Wolf of Wall Street

=== Screenwriter of the Year ===
Joel and Ethan Coen – Inside Llewyn Davis

- Steve Coogan and Jeff Pope – Philomena
- Spike Jonze – Her
- John Ridley – 12 Years a Slave
- Terence Winter – The Wolf of Wall Street

=== Breakthrough British Filmmaker ===
Jon S. Baird – Filth

- Scott Graham – Shell
- Marcus Markou – Papadopoulos & Sons
- Rufus Norris – Broken
- Paul Wright – For Those in Peril

=== Actor of the Year ===
Chiwetel Ejiofor – 12 Years a Slave

- Bruce Dern – Nebraska
- Leonardo DiCaprio – The Wolf of Wall Street
- Michael Douglas – Behind the Candelabra
- Tom Hanks – Captain Phillips

=== Actress of the Year ===
Cate Blanchett – Blue Jasmine

- Sandra Bullock – Gravity
- Judi Dench – Philomena
- Adèle Exarchopoulos – Blue Is the Warmest Colour
- Greta Gerwig – Frances Ha

=== Supporting Actor of the Year ===
Barkhad Abdi – Captain Phillips

- Michael Fassbender – 12 Years a Slave
- James Gandolfini – Enough Said
- Tom Hanks – Saving Mr. Banks
- Jared Leto – Dallas Buyers Club

=== Supporting Actress of the Year ===
Lupita Nyong'o – 12 Years a Slave

- Naomie Harris – Mandela: Long Walk to Freedom
- Sally Hawkins – Blue Jasmine
- Jennifer Lawrence – American Hustle
- June Squibb – Nebraska

=== British Actor of the Year ===
James McAvoy – Filth, Trance, and Welcome to the Punch

- Christian Bale – American Hustle and Out of the Furnace
- Steve Coogan – Alan Partridge: Alpha Papa, The Look of Love, Philomena, and What Maisie Knew
- Chiwetel Ejiofor – 12 Years a Slave
- Michael Fassbender – The Counselor and 12 Years a Slave

=== British Actress of the Year ===
Judi Dench – Philomena

- Lindsay Duncan – About Time, Last Passenger, and Le Week-End
- Naomie Harris – Mandela: Long Walk to Freedom
- Sally Hawkins – Blue Jasmine
- Emma Thompson – Beautiful Creatures and Saving Mr. Banks

=== Young British Performer of the Year ===
Conner Chapman – The Selfish Giant

- Saoirse Ronan – Byzantium, The Host, and How I Live Now
- Eloise Laurence – Broken
- George MacKay – Breakfast with Jonny Wilkinson, For Those in Peril, How I Live Now, and Sunshine on Leith
- Shaun Thomas – The Selfish Giant

=== Technical Achievement ===
Gravity – Tim Webber, visual effects

- 12 Years a Slave – Sean Bobbitt, cinematography
- American Hustle – Judy Becker, production design
- Behind the Candelabra – Howard Cummings, production design
- Filth – Mark Eckersley, editing
- Frances Ha – Sam Levy, cinematography
- The Hunger Games: Catching Fire – Trish Summerville, costumes
- Inside Llewyn Davis – T-Bone Burnett, music
- Stoker – Kurt Swanson and Bart Mueller, costumes
- Upstream Color – Johnny Marshall, sound design

=== Dilys Powell Award ===
- **Gary Oldman**
