= Papadopoulos & Sons =

- UK release poster
- Directed by: Marcus Markou
- Written by: Marcus Markou
- Produced by: Sara Butler; Andrew Markou
- Starring: Stephen Dillane; Georges Corraface; Ed Stoppard; Georgia Groome; Frank Dillane; Selina Cadell; Cosima Shaw
- Cinematography: James Friend
- Edited by: Sebastian Morrison
- Music by: Stephen Warbeck
- Production company: Double M Films
- Distributed by: Double M Films
- Release dates: October 2012 (Dinard Film Festival); 5 April 2013 (United Kingdom)
- Running time: 105 minutes
- Country: United Kingdom
- Language: English
- Budget: £825,000

Papadopoulos & Sons is a 2012 British comedy-drama film written and directed by Marcus Markou and self-distributed in the UK and Ireland by Markou's own company Double M Films through an agreement with Cineworld on 5 April 2013. Cineworld initially agreed to distribute the film for one week only in a limited number of screens across the UK, but due to unprecedented audience demand, extended the run while expanding to more venues.

== Plot ==
Greek immigrant Harry Papadopoulos has got it all: a mansion, awards and a lavish lifestyle as a successful entrepreneur reigning over a financial empire in the food industry. But when the banking crisis hits, Harry and his family - shy horticulturist James, snobby fashion victim Katie, and precocious child prodigy Theo - lose everything. Everything, except the dormant and forgotten Three Brothers Fish & Chip Shop half-owned by Harry's larger-than-life brother Spiros who's been estranged from the family for years.

With no alternative, Harry and his family are forced to pack their bags and reluctantly join Uncle Spiros to live above the neglected Three Brothers chippie. Together they bring the chip shop back to life under the suspicious gaze of their old rival, Hassan, from the neighbouring Turkish kebab shop whose son has his eyes on Katie. As each family member comes to terms with their new life, Harry struggles to regain his lost business empire. But as the chip shop returns to life, old memories are stirred and Harry discovers that only when you lose everything can you be free to find it all.

== Main cast ==
- Stephen Dillane as Harry Papadopoulos
- Georges Corraface as Uncle Spiros
- Georgia Groome as Katie Papadopoulos
- Frank Dillane as James Papadopoulos
- Ed Stoppard as Rob
- Cosima Shaw as Sophie
- Selina Cadell as Mrs Parrington
- Marcus Markou as News Reporter
- Richard Durden as Father Jimmy
- George Savvides as Hassan Ali
- Cesare Taurasi as Mehmet Ali
- Thomas Underhill as Theo
- Alexander Hanson as Lars

== Production ==
Papadopoulos & Sons was inspired by Marcus Markou's own family history and cultural roots, which fuelled his desire to focus on family unity: "I came from a very tight-knit Greek-Cypriot family", said the director. "However, as we grew older and grew up, my family, like so many other families, broke apart. I also lost so many of my Hellenic roots. In making the film I reached out to that sense of family that had been lost and I reached out to my Hellenic roots. [The film] is not about being Greek or Cypriot at all. I use that as backdrop. It really is about family unity at a difficult time".

The film was shot in the London area. The crew found a street with two empty shops in Morden, South London, and took the lease on them. One became the chip shop The Three Brothers, the other the rival kebab shop. The bridge scene was filmed in Morden Hall Park. The city scenes were filmed in Central London and the mansion scenes in Croydon. Finally, the Papadopoulos factory was set in a real Greek food factory in East London.

== Reception ==
Papadopoulos & Sons was awarded three stars out of five by The Guardian, which described the film as "an ambitious attempt to rewrite Lear for laughter rather than tears. It's a throwback, but relaxed, sweet and funny with it: a first feature that makes an impression by not pushing too hard to make an impression". The Daily Telegraph compared it to Raymond De Felitta's City Island and concluded that "it gets by almost wholly on hangdog charm, but that’s an underrated asset, and so is Dillane, delivering a terse and rueful performance that’s typically excellent." On review aggregator Rotten Tomatoes, the film holds an approval rating of 71% based on 14 reviews, with an average rating of 5.73/10.

It was shown at several film festivals across the world, including the annual Festival of British Cinema in Dinard, France, the Palm Springs International Film Festival, the Seattle International Film Festival and the Thessaloniki International Film Festival, where it received the Michael Cacoyannis Audience Award. It was also screened at the European Parliament in November 2012.

In June 2013, the film was released in 70 cinemas in Germany, with almost 24,000 admissions during the first weekend. It was later screened in Nicosia, Cyprus for a week in late November 2013, with all proceeds being donated to a charity helping people who have been affected by the economic crisis. The film was later picked up for TV distribution in the UK, France, Germany, Greece and the Middle East.

Director Marcus Markou was nominated for the "Breakthrough British filmmaker" award at the London Film Critics Circle Awards 2013 for his work on Papadopoulos & Sons.
