= BusinessesForSale.com =

E-commerce platform

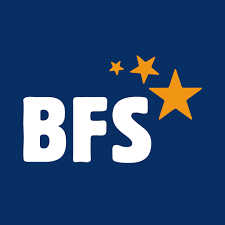
- Industry: E-Commerce, Business broker
- Founded: December 14, 1995; 30 years ago
- Founder: Marcus Markou, Andrew Markou & Nick Pili
- Website: https://www.businessesforsale.com/

BusinessesForSale.com is an e-commerce platform specialising in the buying and selling of businesses.

== History ==
BusinessesForSale was created in 1996 by brothers Andrew Markou, Marcus Markou alongside relative Nick Pili. Initially growing out of a family-run print classifieds business, the website soon superseded that of the magazine, 'Businesses and Premises for Sale; which ceased publication in 1998.

By 1999, BusinessesForSale.com was the largest global database of businesses for sale, and spanned across 100 countries. The following year, the company raised £1.7 million from Angel Investors, notably including Conservative MP, Francis Maude.

An early 2000 technology column in The Guardian highlighted BusinessesForSale.com as a site “featuring thousands of firms for sale right across the globe”, citing examples ranging from a fish-and-chip shop in Lincolnshire to a wine factory in Hungary and a floating prison ship in Hawaii.

A later analysis on AllBusiness.com, published in 2010, compared leading business-for-sale websites and noted that BusinessesForSale.com had a strong overseas audience, with “better exposure to international buyers”, and at that time slightly more web traffic than rival BizBuySell according to Alexa rankings. It also reported that BusinessesForSale.com was ranked number one in the United Kingdom and Australia for business-for-sale traffic.

A 2019 interview with founders Andrew and Marcus Markou on SmallBusiness.co.uk stated that the site had grown to advertise almost 80,000 businesses for sale internationally, building on their father’s business classifieds magazine from the 1990s.

In March 2026, BusinessesForSale.com announced it would undertake a website rebrand and a new podcast to mark its thirtieth anniversary. SME Today reported company data showing that franchise and resale enquiries had increased as a proportion of the platform’s business leads, from 11.27% in January 2021 to 15.96% in January 2026. Co-founder and chief executive Andrew Markou described growing interest in established businesses and franchises among younger people, including graduates, and older professionals leaving corporate careers.

In 2026, BusinessesForSale.com published its Business Ownership Index, a UK survey examining attitudes towards employment, entrepreneurship and business ownership. The research explored declining confidence in traditional corporate careers and growing interest in self-employment and acquiring established businesses. Its findings attracted national media coverage, including articles in the Daily Mail's This is Money and the Daily Express, highlighting changing attitudes towards career security and entrepreneurship.

== Notable Listings ==
In December 2000, the Evening Standard reported that Thwaites & Reed, a 260-year-old clockmaking firm responsible for maintaining the Great Clock of Westminster (commonly known as Big Ben), had been put up for sale through BusinessesForSale.com.

In 2002, one of the most popular beaches in Wales was listed for sale on the website. Priced at £377,750, both the beach property and its attached ice-cream business attracted a large number of buyers through the website.

In 2013 The Guardian's daily football email “The Fiver” reported that Scottish football club Heart of Midlothian F.C. had, after entering administration, “suffered the indignity” of being put up for sale on the internet through BusinessesForSale.com. The piece explained that the club’s administrators had placed an advertisement in the Financial Times, which entitled them to a free listing on BusinessesForSale.com as part of the marketing process.

in 2019, Country Life magazine reported that the Hayling Seaside Railway was listed as for sale on BusinessesForSale.com.

== See also ==
- Business broker
- Small and medium-sized enterprises
- Franchising
- Mergers and acquisitions
