= Pond Life (film) =

- Directed by: Bill Buckhurst
- Written by: Richard Cameron
- Produced by: Dominic Dromgoole; Alexandra Breede; Rienkje Attoh
- Starring: Tom Varey; Esmé Creed-Miles; Angus Imrie; Daisy Edgar-Jones; Abraham Lewis; Ethan Wilkie; Gianluca Gallucci; Siân Brooke; Shaun Dooley
- Cinematography: Nick Cooke
- Music by: Richard Hawley; Colin Elliot
- Production company: Open Palm Films
- Distributed by: Verve Pictures
- Release date: 14 November 2018 (Leeds)
- Running time: 99 minutes
- Country: United Kingdom
- Language: English

Pond Life is a 2018 drama film written by Richard Cameron and directed by Bill Buckhurst. It stars Esmé Creed-Miles, Tom Varey, Angus Imrie, Daisy Edgar-Jones, Abraham Lewis, Ethan Wilkie and Gianluca Gallucci. The music was produced by Richard Hawley.

It tells the story of a group of young friends who embark on a life changing fishing trip in the summer of 1994.

== Cast ==
- Tom Varey as Trev
- Esmé Creed-Miles as Pogo
- Angus Imrie as Malcolm
- Daisy Edgar-Jones as Cassie
- Abraham Lewis as Maurice
- Ethan Wilkie as Dave
- Gianluca Gallucci as Shane
- Shaun Dooley as Rus
- Siân Brooke as Pogo's Mum
- Sally Lindsay as Irene
- Siobhan Finneran as Kath
- Faye McKeever as Tracey
- Julie Hesmondhalgh as Muriel
- Adrian Hood as Billy
- Steve Garti as Kenny

== Production ==
Pond Life was released by Verve Pictures in 2019 and produced by Open Palm Films as part of the original slate of films announced in 2017 by founder Dominic Dromgoole. The screenplay was adapted by Richard Cameron from his original stage play, of the same name, which debuted at The Bush in 1992 when Dromgoole was artistic director. Pond Life is director Bill Buckhurst's feature debut. Buckhurst was first introduced to Dromgoole while working at Shakespeare's Globe where he directed eight productions from 2012.

== Reception ==
Pond Life premiered at the Glasgow International Film Festival 2019. It received a 71% rating on Rotten Tomatoes from 14 reviews. The Times reported that, "The depictions of sunburnt teenagers ambling through estates, obsessing over crushes and minor betrayals, yet haunted by the terrible truths of the adult world, seemed utterly true."
