= Kate Hamill =

American actress and playwright

- Born: United States
- Writing career
- Genre: Plays
- Notable awards: "Playwright of the Year"

Kate Hamill is an American actress and playwright.

Hamill is known for writing and acting in innovative, contemporary adaptations of classic novels for the stage, including Jane Austen’s Sense and Sensibility, Emma, and Pride and Prejudice; William Makepeace Thackeray’s Vanity Fair; Bram Stoker's Dracula; Louisa May Alcott's Little Women; and Arthur Conan Doyle's Sherlock Holmes stories. She also writes new plays and works as an actor, independently.

In 2017, The Wall Street Journal named Hamill "Playwright of the Year." She has been named one of the most-produced playwrights in America for every year ranging from 2017 -2023 by American Theatre magazine, which is published by TCG Theatre Communications Group. In 2023, Primary Stages presented Hamill with the Einhorn Mentorship Award.

== Childhood and education ==
Hamill grew up in a dairy farmhouse in Lansing, New York, or as she puts it, in "a town with more cows than people.". She was "a small, high-energy, highly emotional child" and "grew up in a household that prized reading and literature". Her bedtime reading featured Greek myths and classic novels, including Jane Austen's works.

She married her long-term partner, actor and oft-time co-star Jason O'Connell, on January 20, 2020.

She received a BFA in acting from Ithaca College.

== Career ==
Hamill creates stories that are female-centered and feminist. As a playwright, she has a playful and theatrical style that features absurdity while examining social and gender issues. As an actor, she "tends to play truth-tellers, oddballs, and misfits: complicated people who color outside the lines."

=== Sense and Sensibility ===
Hamill's Sense and Sensibility premiered in a short run at New York City's Bedlam Theater Company in November 2014. It had a longer run in 2016 directed by Eric Tucker, also at Bedlam. Hamill played Marianne Dashwood. The play was staged at the Pacific Repertory Theatre in 2024.

=== Vanity Fair ===
Vanity Fair was produced by Manhattan's Pearl Theater in 2017, with Hamill playing Becky Sharp.

=== Pride and Prejudice ===
Hamill's adaptation of Pride and Prejudice premiered at the Hudson Valley Shakespeare Festival in 2017, directed by Amanda Dehnert. The production, in which Hamill and her long-term partner, Jason O'Connell, play the leading roles of Elizabeth Bennet and Mr. Darcy, transferred to Manhattan's Primary Stages. This play was published in script form by Dramatists Play Service INC.

=== Little Women ===
In 2018, Hamill's adaptation of Little Women premiered at the Jungle Theater in Minneapolis, directed by Sarah Rasmussen. For its New York City premiere in 2019, it opened at the Cherry Lane Theatre, directed by Sarna Lapine. This play was published in script form by Dramatists Play Service INC.

=== Dracula (a feminist revenge fantasy) ===
In 2020, Hamill's feminist retelling of Dracula opened at Classic Stage Company, directed by Sarna Lapine. This play was published by TRW plays.

=== Ms. Holmes & Ms. Watson - Apt. 2B ===
In 2021, Hamill's "cheerful desecration" of Sherlock Holmes stories opened at Kansas City Rep, directed by Jose Zayas. This play was published by TRW plays.

=== Emma ===
In 2022, Hamill's adaptation of Jane Austen's Emma opened at the Guthrie Theatre, directed by Meredith McDonough. This play was published by TRW plays.

=== The Little Fellow (Or, The Queen of Tarts Tells All) ===
In 2023, Hamill's original play about the British courtesan Harriette Wilson premiered at Cygnet Theater, directed by Rob Lutfy.

=== The Scarlet Letter ===
In 2024, Hamill's adaptation of Nathaniel Hawthorne's The Scarlet Letter premiered at Two River Theater, directed by Shelley Butler.

=== The Light and The Dark (the life and times of Artemisia Gentileschi) ===
In August 2024, Hamill's original play about the artist Artemisia Gentileschi premiered at Chautauqua Theater Company in Chautauqua, New York, directed by Jade King Carroll. It is currently being performed in Manhattan at Primary Stages at 59E59 Theaters in November and December 2024.

=== The Odyssey ===
Hamill's 3-act adaptation of the Homeric epic is scheduled to premiere at American Repertory Theater in February 2025. Shana Cooper is directing.
