= Ordinary Dreams; or How to Survive a Meltdown with Flair =

Play written by Marcus Markou

Ordinary Dreams; Or How to Survive a Meltdown with Flair, is a black comedy written by Marcus Markou, which premiered at the Trafalgar Studios on 14 May 2009 and ran until 6 June. The cast included Sia Berkeley, Adrian Bower, James Lance and Imogen Slaughter. The story concerns a character who during a recession has a breakdown and fantasizes about becoming the Prime Minister of Great Britain.

The Spectator magazine review called it "A bourgeois sitcom with a macabre heart and a central character who responds to stress by indulging in a satirical dream-life". The review in The Sunday Times was scathing and gave it one star.

The play was directed by Adam Barnard and produced by James Seabright.
