= Fonda (film) =

Upcoming film by Justine Triet

- Directed by: Justine Triet
- Written by: Justine Triet
- Produced by: Marie-Ange Luciani; David Thion; Nathanaël Karmitz; Elisha Karmitz; Fionnuala Jamison; Delphine Tomson; Jean-Pierre Dardenne; Luc Dardenne; Anna Marsh; Francois Mergier; Assia Barge
- Starring: Mia Goth; Andrew Scott; Frank Dillane; Nathan Stewart-Jarrett; Allison Janney; Odessa A'zion; Ewan Mitchell; Cherry Jones; Benedict Wong
- Cinematography: Tom Harai
- Production companies: StudioCanal; mk2 Films; Les Films de Pierre; Les Films Pelléas; Les Films du Fleuve; House Productions; BBC Film
- Distributed by: StudioCanal
- Countries: France; Belgium; United Kingdom
- Language: English

Fonda is an upcoming psychological thriller film written and directed by Justine Triet.

== Cast ==
- Mia Goth
- Andrew Scott
- Frank Dillane
- Nathan Stewart-Jarrett
- Allison Janney
- Odessa A'zion
- Ewan Mitchell
- Cherry Jones
- Benedict Wong

== Production ==
In January 2026, Deadline Hollywood reported that Justine Triet would make her English-language debut writing and directing the psychological thriller film Fonda. Mia Goth, Andrew Scott, Frank Dillane, Nathan Stewart-Jarrett, and Allison Janney were announced as cast members. Goth initially auditioned for a supporting role, but Triet was so impressed by her performance that she offered her the lead.

On 1 April 2026, Odessa A'zion, Ewan Mitchell, Cherry Jones, and Benedict Wong were announced to be added to the cast. Principal photography on the film began on 10 April 2026, and ended on 10 July 2026, originally set to last through June. Filming took place primarily in southwest France, with additional scenes shot in England.
