= Imogen Slaughter =

British actress

Imogen Slaughter is a British actress who was educated at Framlingham College and graduated from the Oxford School of Drama. Her credits include Elizabeth in David Starkey's four-part 2000 television documentary about Elizabeth I (directed by Mark Fielder and Steven Clarke) and as Penny in the Trafalgar Studios's production of Ordinary Dreams; Or How to Survive a Meltdown with Flair. She is the grand-niece of British horror film star and theatre actor Tod Slaughter.
