= Sense and Sensibility (2026 film) =

Film by Georgia Oakley

- Theatrical release poster
- Directed by: Georgia Oakley
- Screenplay by: Diana Reid
- Based on: Sense and Sensibility by Jane Austen
- Produced by: Tim Bevan; Eric Fellner; India Flint; Jo Wallett
- Starring: Daisy Edgar-Jones; Esmé Creed-Miles; Caitríona Balfe; Frank Dillane; Herbert Nordrum; George MacKay; Fiona Shaw
- Cinematography: Arnaud Potier
- Edited by: Izabella Curry
- Music by: Roger Goula
- Production companies: Working Title Films; November Pictures; Kiddo Films
- Distributed by: Focus Features (United States); Universal Pictures (International)
- Release dates: September 15, 2026 (Odeon Luxe Leicester Square); September 25, 2026 (United Kingdom); October 16, 2026 (United States)
- Running time: 132 minutes
- Countries: United Kingdom; United States
- Language: English
- Budget: $20–25 million
- Box office: $45 million

Sense and Sensibility is a 2026 period romantic drama film directed by Georgia Oakley from a screenplay by Diana Reid. It is based on the 1811 novel by Jane Austen. The film stars Daisy Edgar-Jones, Esmé Creed-Miles, Caitríona Balfe, Frank Dillane, Herbert Nordrum, George MacKay, and Fiona Shaw.

Sense and Sensibility was released in the United Kingdom on 25 September 2026, and was released in the United States on 16 October. It received generally positive reviews from critics.

== Plot ==
The Dashwood sisters – Elinor, Marianne and Margaret – and their mother face potential poverty when, on Mr Dashwood's death, his estate passes to the sisters' half-brother John and his snobbish wife, Fanny. Fanny persuades John to withhold the financial assistance his father had asked him to provide, and the couple take possession of the estate, disrupting the sisters' lives. Fanny's brother, Edward Ferrars, visits and forms a close bond with Elinor, much to Fanny's dismay. Mrs Jennings, a distant relative of the Dashwoods, offers them a Devonshire cottage owned by her son-in-law, Sir John Middleton, at a reduced rent. Mrs Dashwood accepts. Elinor hopes that Edward will propose, though he merely promises to visit.

In Devonshire, Marianne initially finds Colonel Brandon, a family friend of Sir John, unappealing. Brandon, however, develops feelings for Marianne. Elinor is saddened when Edward writes to say he will not visit.

Marianne sprains her ankle while visiting the beach with Margaret and is rescued by John Willoughby, to whom she is immediately attracted. They begin courting, but just as the family anticipate a proposal, Willoughby abruptly announces that he must travel to London and will be gone for 12 months.

Mrs Jennings invites Elinor and Marianne to London with Lady Middleton and her cousin Lucy Steele, where they expect that Edward will visit. Lucy, aware of Elinor's feelings for Edward, reveals that she and Edward have been secretly engaged for years. Edward explains that his parents arranged the match in the expectation of Lucy's wealth, but he refused to abandon her after she lost her fortune. Having hoped Lucy would end the engagement herself, he feels himself bound in honour. Heartbroken, Elinor accepts the situation and promises to keep their secret.

Willoughby ignores Marianne's letters and fails to visit the Dashwoods in London. Hoping to see him at a ball, Marianne is devastated when he arrives with his wealthy fiancée, Miss Grey, and treats her coldly. Overcome with anguish, she makes a spectacle of herself before admitting to Elinor that she and Willoughby were never formally engaged. She insists that, unlike Elinor, she cannot quietly accept her disappointment. Colonel Brandon subsequently reveals that Willoughby had seduced his widowed sister-in-law, Eliza, before abandoning her; she later died with her unborn child.

When the Ferrars family discovers Edward's engagement, he is disinherited and his younger brother Robert becomes the heir. Impressed by Edward's integrity, Brandon offers him a nearby parsonage, enabling him to marry. During what she believes will be her final conversation with Edward, Elinor urges him to honour his commitment.

On their return journey, Mrs Jennings takes the Dashwood sisters and Brandon to visit her youngest daughter. Learning that Willoughby's estate is nearby, Marianne walks out in the rain to see it and falls gravely ill with a fever. Willoughby arrives unexpectedly, drunk, and professes his love for Marianne, pleading to see her. Elinor's sympathy diminishes when he is dismissive of his own treatment of Eliza, and Brandon forcibly ejects him. The family watch from Marianne's room as Brandon and Willoughby duel. Neither is injured: Willoughby misses, while Brandon deliberately fires into the air. Unexpectedly, Marianne expresses concern only for Brandon's safety.

Marianne recovers, and the party returns to Devonshire. She grows closer to Brandon, suggesting they might have a future together once she has recovered from her heartbreak. He willingly gives her time. The family subsequently hear that Lucy has become Mrs Ferrars. Edward arrives and declares his love for Elinor; believing he is behaving dishonourably to his new wife, Elinor sends him away. Mrs Jennings later learns that Lucy had abandoned Edward after his disinheritance and that in order to secure a wealthy husband she married Robert instead. Overjoyed, Elinor rushes to Edward, declares her love, and the pair become engaged.

== Cast ==
- Daisy Edgar-Jones as Elinor Dashwood
- Esmé Creed-Miles as Marianne Dashwood
- Caitríona Balfe as Mrs Dashwood
- Bodhi Rae Breathnach as Margaret Dashwood
- Frank Dillane as John Willoughby
- Herbert Nordrum as Colonel Brandon
- George MacKay as Edward Ferrars
- Fiona Shaw as Mrs Jennings
- Stacy Martin as Fanny Dashwood
- Tom Brooke as John Dashwood
- Turlough Convery as Sir John Middleton
- Chloe Pirrie as Lady Middleton
- Bethany Slater as Mrs Palmer
- Eliot Sumner as Mr Palmer
- Ceara Coveney as Lucy Steele

== Production ==
In June 2025, it was reported a film adaptation of Jane Austen's first novel Sense and Sensibility (1811) would be directed by Georgia Oakley for Working Title Films and Focus Features from a screenplay by Diana Reid. Producers include Working Title's Tim Bevan and Eric Fellner, with India Flint of November Pictures and Jo Wallett of Kiddo Films. The cast is led by Daisy Edgar-Jones, Esmé Creed-Miles, and Bodhi Rae Breathnach.

Caitríona Balfe, Fiona Shaw, Frank Dillane, and George MacKay joined the cast in July 2025. Principal photography commenced in the United Kingdom that month.

Arnaud Potier served as cinematographer and shot it in 35mm film. Francesca Di Mottola served as production designer and Grace Snell served as costume designer, while Izabella Curry edited the film.

=== Music ===
Roger Goula was hired to compose the score for the film.

== Release ==
Sense and Sensibility had its world premiere at London's Leicester Square on 15 September 2026. The film was released theatrically on 25 September 2026, in the United Kingdom and it was released on 16 October 2026, in the United States.

== Reception ==
=== Box office ===
As of 17 November 2026, Sense and Sensibility has grossed $19 million in the United States and Canada, and $26 million in other territories (including $9 million in the United Kingdom), for a worldwide total of $45 million.

In the United States and Canada, Sense and Sensibility was released alongside Street Fighter, You Can See Everything, and Whalefall, and was projected to gross $5–8 million from 2,545 theaters in its opening weekend. The film made $3.3 million on its first day, and went on to debut to $7.3 million, finishing in fifth.

=== Critical response ===
On the review aggregator website Rotten Tomatoes, 78% of 139 critics' reviews are positive, with an average rating of 7.1/10. The website's consensus reads: "Elevating the Dashwood sisters' relationship to the forefront of Jane Austen's classic tale of courtship, Georgia Oakley's Sense and Sensibility may not best previous adaptations but achieves a wistful identity of its own." Metacritic, which uses a weighted average, assigned the film a score of 71 out of 100, based on 41 critics, indicating "generally favorable" reviews. Audiences polled by CinemaScore gave the film an average grade of "A–" on an A+ to F scale.

Robbie Collin of The Telegraph gave the film 5 out of 5 stars, declaring it a "wild and plangently beautiful successor" to Ang Lee's Sense and Sensibility, as well as "Austen with the bonnets blown off". Peter Bradshaw of The Guardian rated the film 3 out of 5 stars, concluding that "overall, the movie always looks and sounds perfectly good, though some of the sensibility is lacking".

==== Hairstyling ====
The hairstyles in the 2026 Sense and Sensibility received a fair amount of criticism due to purported historical inaccuracies and laidback look. Backlash began circulating before the film's release, from the trailer alone. According to Emma Rosenblum of the Wall Street Journal, the protagonist Marianne has "long and tangled" hair that does not reflect the actual story. The review also criticized the messy hair of other contemporary adaptions of 19th-century literature, such as Emerald Fennell's Wuthering Heights (2026) and Netflix's 2026 Pride and Prejudice adaptation. In a review for The Conversation, Meg Kobza remarks that Marianne's "stringy hair" and Elinor's "soft waves" represented their contrasting personalities.

Nadia Stacey, the makeup artist and hair-stylist for the film, purposefully went for "wild, unruly, rain-soaked hair" in contrast to the traditional Austen "stiff up-dos", according to British Vogue. Stacey wanted the protagonists to be relatable for a 21st-century audience. She took inspiration from other decades, such as a photograph from the 1930s. According to Stacey, Esmé Creed-Miles and Daisy Edgar-Jones both wore hair extensions.

Daisy Edgar-Jones, who plays Elinor

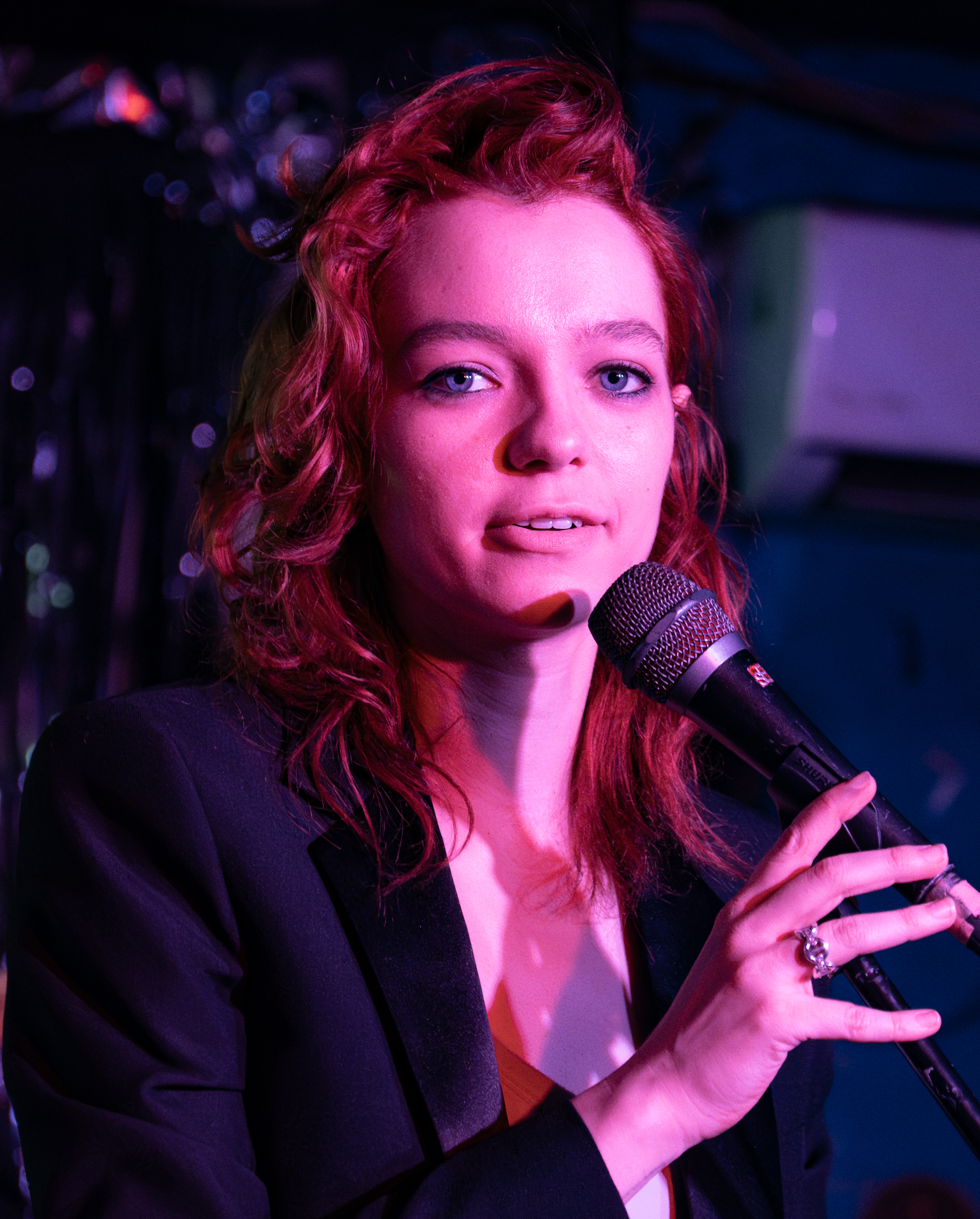
Esmé Creed-Miles, who plays Marianne

Fanny Dashwood, on the other hand, had a more traditional up-do throughout the movie. Stacy Martin wore a bald cap and a light blond wig for the role. Elinor Dashwood, portrayed by Daisy Edgar Jones, did not receive as much criticism for her hairdos. Grazia calls her hair "wild and unbrushed" while others called Elinor's hair tamer in comparison to that of her younger sister's.

Over the course of the movie, Elinor's hair gradually becomes more undone, in contrast to Marianne, who always wears a loose hair look. The ballroom scene received criticism in particular, since Marianne's hair was very unkempt. The ballroom dance scene was called anachronistic and exaggerated. According to Stacey, the styling of the ballroom scene was the idea of Grace Snell, the costume designer, who found an image of a woman with a "band of fabric" around her hair. Stacey calls Marianne's look a form of "wildness".

Stacey also avoided comparisons to Ang Lee's Sense and Sensibility, since the 2026 film was not supposed to be a remake of the previous one, but an adaptation of Austen's original work. Stacey admitted that Marianne's looks turned out more unkempt than planned, but ultimately stands by the film.

In response to the backlash, the writer Diana Reid defended the decision, and claimed it was director Georgia Oakley's artistic intention. Esmé Creed-Miles also defended the hairstyling, saying it was typical for unmarried young women of the time, and that no one can really know what average women wore on a day-to-day basis. She also called Marianne a rebellious woman who would not have wanted to conform to beauty standards. On the topic, Reid said:

We felt, especially characters like Marianne, even though it was probably the most decorous thing to keep your hair up, she's not the kind of character who cares about that. It was like an opportunity to show character and show how they relate to the conventions of their own time.

— Diana Reid

Creed-Miles said that the conversation around the hairstyles is "distracting" and Edgar-Jones said the film had the right to change things since it is "an artistic interpretation".

=== Accolades ===
Award	Date of ceremony	Category	Nominee(s)	Result	Ref.
Gotham Independent Film Awards	November 30, 2026	Outstanding Supporting Performance	Esmé Creed-Miles	Pending	
