= Sense and Sensibility (1981 TV series) =

1981 British television drama series

- DVD cover: Tracey Childs & Irene Richard
- Written by: Alexander Baron
- Directed by: Rodney Bennett
- Starring: Irene Richard; Tracey Childs; Diana Fairfax
- Music by: Dudley Simpson
- Country of origin: United Kingdom
- Original language: English
- No. of series: 1
- No. of episodes: 7

Production
- Producer: Barry Letts
- Running time: 26 minutes (per episode)

Original release
- Network: BBC1
- Release: 1 February – 15 March 1981

Sense and Sensibility is a 1981 BBC television adaptation of Jane Austen's 1811 novel. The seven-part series was dramatised by Alexander Baron and directed by Rodney Bennett. This adaptation omits the character of Margaret Dashwood, the younger sister of Elinor and Marianne. It has been remastered for release on DVD.

== Cast ==
- Irene Richard – Elinor Dashwood
- Tracey Childs – Marianne Dashwood
- Bosco Hogan – Edward Ferrars
- Robert Swann – Colonel Brandon
- Diana Fairfax – Mrs. Dashwood
- Donald Douglas – Sir John Middleton
- Annie Leon – Mrs. Jennings
- Peter Woodward – John Willoughby
- Marjorie Bland – Lady Middleton
- Peter Gale – John Dashwood
- Amanda Boxer – Fanny Dashwood
- Christopher Brown – Mr. Palmer
- Hetty Baynes – Charlotte Palmer
- Julia Chambers – Lucy Steele
- Pippa Sparkes – Ann Steele
- Philip Bowen – Robert Ferrars
- Margot Van der Burgh – Mrs. Ferrars
- John Owens –Tom
