= Viena and the Fantomes =

- Film poster
- Directed by: Gerardo Naranjo
- Written by: Gerardo Naranjo
- Produced by: Hunter Gray; Alex Orlovsky; Christopher Ramirez
- Starring: Dakota Fanning; Jeremy Allen White; Frank Dillane; Olivia Luccardi; Sarah Steele; Philip Ettinger; Ryan LeBeouf; Caleb Landry Jones; Zoë Kravitz; Evan Rachel Wood
- Cinematography: Gerardo Naranjo; Emilio Valdés
- Edited by: Charles Cantrell; Cody LeBoeuf; Ryan LeBoeuf
- Music by: Will Patterson
- Production companies: Lola Pictures; Ousia Entertainment; Mutressa Movies; Silver State Productions
- Distributed by: Universal Pictures
- Release date: June 30, 2020
- Running time: 96 minutes
- Country: United States
- Language: English

Viena and the Fantomes is an American musical romantic drama film, written and directed by Gerardo Naranjo. It stars Dakota Fanning, Jeremy Allen White, Frank Dillane, Olivia Luccardi, Sarah Steele, Philip Ettinger, Ryan LeBeouf, Caleb Landry Jones, Zoë Kravitz and Evan Rachel Wood.

It was released on June 30, 2020, by Universal Pictures.

== Plot ==
A roadie travels across the United States with a punk band during the 1980s.

== Cast ==
- Dakota Fanning as Viena
- Jeremy Allen White as Freddy
- Frank Dillane as Keyes
- Olivia Luccardi as Rebecca
- Sarah Steele as Loona
- Philip Ettinger as Boyer
- Ryan LeBeouf as Paul
- Caleb Landry Jones as Albert
- Zoë Kravitz as Midge
- Evan Rachel Wood as Susi
- Jon Bernthal as Monroe

== Production ==
Production on the film began in 2014 in Las Vegas, Nevada, with Gerardo Naranjo making his English-language debut from a screenplay he wrote. The film ultimately was delayed until 2020, due to the filmmakers wanting the "perfect" edit.

== Release ==
The film was released through video on demand on June 30, 2020, by Universal Pictures.

== Critical reception ==
Viena and the Fantomes holds a 20% approval rating on review aggregator website Rotten Tomatoes, based on five reviews, with an average of 4/10.
