= Julia Chambers =

British actress

- Born: Bristol, England

Julia Chambers is an English television actress. She was born in Bristol, England.

== Selected filmography ==
Television

- The Mallens (1979)
- Cribb (1980)
- Shoestring (1980)
- Sense and Sensibility (1981)
- Beau Geste (1982)
- The Optimist (1985)
- Agatha Christie's Poirot (1989)
- Wycliffe (1995)

Julia Chambers performed regular roles at Salisbury Playhouse which included the touring production of Forsyte Saga
