= Sia Berkeley =

British actress (born 1985)

- Born: 24 April 1985 (age 41); London, England
- Occupation: Actress
- Years active: 2006-present

Sia Berkeley (born 24 April 1985) is an English actress. She is best known for her television work, perhaps most for playing Scarlett in the television series Skins.

== Career ==
Berkeley graduated from the Royal Academy of Dramatic Art in 2006. In her last year there, she was nominated for the 2006 Spotlight Prize. She made her West End stage debut in May 2009 at the Trafalgar Studios in the play Ordinary Dreams; Or How to Survive a Meltdown with Flair

== Filmography ==
=== Film ===
Year	Title	Role	Notes
2010	Wild Target	Smart Hotel Receptionist	
2015	Anna, Island	Anna	Short

=== Television ===
Year	Title	Role	Notes
2006	The Bill	Jenny Robbins	Episode: "451: The Wrong Man"
2008	Skins	Scarlett	Episode: "Michelle"
2008	Holby City	Zoe Andrews	Episode: "Eighteen and a Half"
2009	Wuthering Heights	Frances Earnshaw	Mini-series
2010	Any Human Heart	Martha Gellhorn	Mini-series
2010	Doctors	Lydia Metcalfe	Episode: "Risky Business"
2013	Doctors	Rowena Cork	Episode: "Difficulty"
2013	Big Bad World	Karen	1 episode
2014	Grantchester	Annie	2 episodes
