= Tracey Childs =

English actress

- Born: 30 May 1963 (age 63); London, England, UK
- Occupation: Actress
- Spouse: Tony Anholt (1990–98)
- Partner: Ian Morton (?–?)

Tracey Childs (born 30 May 1963) is an English actress known for playing Lynne Howard in the 1980s drama series Howards' Way. Her other television roles include Marianne Dashwood in Sense and Sensibility (1981), Linda Cosgrove in Born and Bred (2002–05), Patty Cornwell in Hollyoaks (2003–04) and Elaine Jenkinson in Broadchurch (2013).

== Career ==
Born in London, Childs’ first on-screen role was in the Upstairs, Downstairs episode, Wanted - a Good Home. She also appeared in The Prime of Miss Jean Brodie as Rose Stanley, Sense and Sensibility, The Scarlet Pimpernel and the 1982 Bergerac episode "A Perfect Recapture". She appeared as Pompeiian citizen Caecilius's wife Metella in "The Fires of Pompeii", in the fourth series of the BBC's Doctor Who.

Childs was married to her Howards' Way co-star Tony Anholt, from 1990 to 1998 and toured with him, Marc Sinden and Gemma Craven in Noël Coward's Private Lives throughout 1991 and into 1992.

She starred opposite Matthew Kelly in Edward Albee's Who's Afraid of Virginia Woolf? at the Trafalgar Studios in London in March 2009.

In 2010 and 2012, she appeared in BBC One's afternoon drama series Doctors.

In 2013 she appeared in Series 1 of the ITV drama Broadchurch as Chief Superintendent Elaine Jenkinson, head of the Broadchurch police.

== Doctor Who audio plays ==
In October 2001, Childs appeared in the Big Finish Doctor Who audiobook Colditz. This audiobook introduced Childs as the character of Elizabeth Klein. In the story, the Seventh Doctor and Ace are caught intruding in Colditz Castle in October 1944, where they meet Klein, a Nazi scientist.

Childs then returned to the part of Klein a further three times: in January–March 2010, for a trilogy of stories featuring the Seventh Doctor; in October 2012 for UNIT: Dominion; and in July–September 2013 for another trilogy of tales. She reprised the role again in the story Warlock's Cross, which was released in November 2018.

== Selected filmography ==
- Richard's Things (1980)
- Sense and Sensibility (1981)
- Jane Eyre (1983)
- A Talent for Murder (1984, TV film)

== Audio work ==
Audiobook performances for Big Finish Productions:

- Colditz (2001)
- A Thousand Tiny Wings (2010)
- "Klein's Story" (2010)
- Survival of the Fittest
- The Architects of History (2010)
- UNIT: Dominion (2012)
- Persuasion (2013)
- Starlight Robbery (2013)
- Daleks Among Us (2013)
- Warlock's Cross (2018)
