= Dominic Dromgoole =

British theatre director and writer

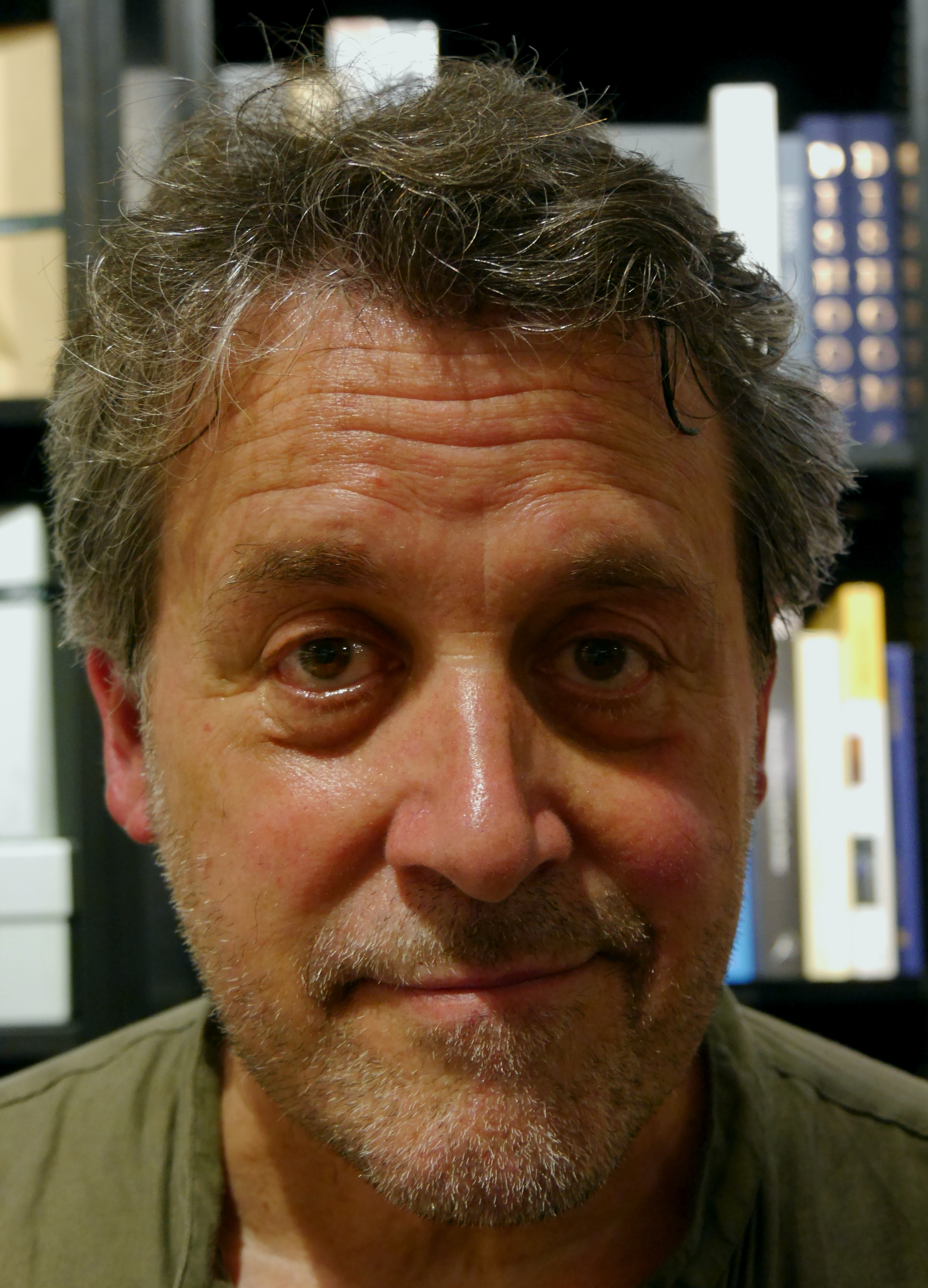
Dominic Dromgoole, Hatchards, London, 2022

Dominic Charles Fleming Dromgoole (born 25 October 1963) is an English theatre director and writer about the theatre who has also worked in film.

== Early life and education ==
Dominic Charles Fleming Dromgoole was born on 25 October 1963 in Bristol. He is the son of an actress turned schoolteacher, Jenny Davis, and Patrick Dromgoole, theatre director and television executive.

Dromgoole grew up on a farm in Somerset and attended Millfield School in Street, Somerset. When he was 16, he formed his own theatre company which took shows to the Edinburgh Festival and toured them round the south-west.

He studied English Literature at St Catharine's College, Cambridge, where he directed student productions and graduated in 1985.

== Career ==
In 1990 Dromgoole became artistic director of the Bush Theatre, London, and stayed there until 1996. During this time, he premiered many new plays, including the original production of Helen Edmundson's The Clearing in 1993, and Samuel Adamson's first play, Clocks and Whistles in 1996, which won rave reviews.

After a period in charge of new plays for Sir Peter Hall's company at the Old Vic, he ran the Oxford Stage Company from 1999 until 2005. His directing credits during this time included Troilus and Cressida, 50 Revolutions, Anton Chekhov's Three Sisters, Rookery Nook by Ben Travers and August Strindberg's Easter.

In 2005, he took over from Mark Rylance as artistic director of Shakespeare's Globe. In 2008, he signed a new three-year contract to continue in the role until 2011. At the Globe, he directed Coriolanus and Antony and Cleopatra for the 2006 season, Love's Labour's Lost for the 2007 season, King Lear in 2008, Romeo and Juliet and the new play A New World by Trevor Griffiths in 2009, Henry IV Part I and Henry IV Part II in 2010, a touring production of Hamlet in 2011, Henry V in 2012 and Gabriel by Samuel Adamson with Alison Balson in 2013. In January 2014 he directed The Duchess of Malfi, the opening production at the Sam Wanamaker Playhouse (the Globe's indoor counterpart).

Between these two spaces Dromgoole then went on to direct: Julius Caesar in 2014, The Changeling and Romeo and Juliet again and Measure for Measure in 2015, Pericles and his final production The Tempest in 2016. In 2012, he also organised, as part of the 2012 Cultural Olympiad, the theatre festival Globe to Globe, where 38 companies from around the world each brought one of Shakespeare's plays staged in their own language to The Globe stage. This inspired the Globe to Globe tour of Hamlet, directed by Dromgoole in 2016, which toured to 197 countries around the world, and is the subject for Dromgoole's second book. July 2013, Shakespeare's Globe announced that Dromgoole would leave the post in April 2016. He was replaced by Emma Rice Following his departure from the Globe, two of his productions, Farinelli and Nell Gwynn, transferred to the West End.

His other directing credits include revivals of Someone Who'll Watch Over Me at the New Ambassadors Theatre in London, Noël Coward's Present Laughter, with Rik Mayall, George Bernard Shaw's John Bull's Other Island at London's Tricycle Theatre, and Eric Schlosser's Americans at the Arcola Theatre. He has also directed plays in the US and Romania.

Since leaving Shakespeare's Globe, Dromgoole has set up Open Palm films, for which he directed Making Noise Quietly by Robert Holman and produced four further films Benjamin written and directed by Simon Amstell, Pond Life, Undercliffe and The Man In The Hat. Dromgoole also founded the Classic Spring theatre company, which presented a season of Oscar Wilde plays at The Vaudeville Theatre, where he directed A Woman of No Importance in 2017. In 2019 Classic Spring announced that Dromgoole would be adapting and directing a double bill production of Frankenstein and Dracula at the Hackney Empire in 2020. In 2023 he directed Jordan Harrison's play, once filmed, Marjorie Prime at London's the Menier Chocolate Factory described by the Guardian as 'elegant'.

== Writing ==
In 2000, Dromgoole's book The Full Room: An A-Z of Contemporary Playwriting provided a personal survey of contemporary British playwriting. In 2006, Will and Me: How Shakespeare Took Over My Life charted his fascination with William Shakespeare, and won the inaugural Sheridan Morley award. Dromgoole has also contributed to The New Statesman, The Sunday Times and other publications. In 2017 his book Hamlet Globe to Globe, recounted experiences from the global tour of Hamlet.

== Personal life ==
Dromgoole's sister is theatre and radio director Jessica Dromgoole and his brother is Sean Dromgoole, the Labour candidate for Somerton and Frome in the 2017 general election.

As of 2011 Dromgoole lived in Hackney, London with his three daughters and partner Sasha Hails.
