= Tom Varey =

British actor

- Born: 1991 or 1992 (age 33–34); Mossley, Greater Manchester, England
- Education: Royal Academy of Dramatic Art
- Occupation: Actor
- Years active: 2014–present

Tom Varey is a British actor. He is known for his roles in Pond Life, No Offence and Ridley Road.

== Early life ==
Varey grew up in Mossley, Greater Manchester. He studied at the Royal Academy of Dramatic Art for three years from 2011 to 2014.

== Career ==
After graduating, Varey starred as Bert Middleton in series two of BBC One series The Village. From 2015, he had a main role in the Channel 4 television series No Offence as PC Stuart O’Connor, playing the role for all three series until the programme ended in 2018. In 2016, he featured in an episode of the sixth season of Game of Thrones as Lord Cley Cerwyn and in episode 1 of ITV series Dark Angel as Billy Mowbray. Varey played PE teacher Will Simpson for the first two series of Ackley Bridge from 2017 to 2018. Varey starred as Trevor in the feature film Pond Life in 2018. He also appeared in episode 5 of Death in Paradise in 2020. In October 2021, he played Jack Morris in Ridley Road. In 2023, Varey starred as Steve O'Callaghan in the Amazon Prime Video series, Fifteen-Love.

== Filmography ==
Film and Television Roles
Year	Title	Role	Notes
2014	The Village	Bert Middleton	Series 2, 5 episodes
2015–2018	No Offence	PC Stuart O'Connell	Main role, 3 series
2016	Game of Thrones	Cley Cerwyn	
2016	Dark Angel	Billy Mowbray	Episode 1
2017–2018	Ackley Bridge	Will Simpson	Main role, 2 series
2018	Pond Life	Trevor	
2020	Death in Paradise	Charlie Lewis	Episode #9.5 Switcharoo
2021	Ridley Road	Jack Morris	Main role
2023	Fifteen-Love	Steve O'Callaghan	Main role
2023	The Boys in the Boat		
