= Richard Cameron (writer) =

English playwright (1948–2026)

- Born: 16 June 1948; Doncaster, Yorkshire, England
- Died: 5 May 2026 (aged 77)
- Occupation: Playwright

Richard Cameron (16 June 1948 – 5 May 2026) was an English playwright from Doncaster. His themes are Northern post-industrial society, working class life, tough women and violent men. Cameron's plays include Pond Life (1992), Not Fade Away (1993), The Mortal Ash (1994), Almost Grown (1994), All of You Mine (1996), The Glee Club (2002), Gong Donkeys (2004), Flower Girls (2007), and Can't Stand Up For Falling Down.

Cameron wrote Dear Nobody starring Sean Maguire, and Stone, Scissors, Paper for BBC (1997). He also contributed to the popular television series Midsomer Murders, writing the script for the episode "Midsomer Rhapsody".

Cameron died on 5 May 2026, at the age of 77.
