= Marcus Markou =

British filmmaker, playwright, and Internet entrepreneur

Marcus Markou is a British film maker, playwright and internet entrepreneur.

Markou's debut feature film Papadopoulos & Sons, starring Stephen Dillane, was completed in 2012. The film was self-distributed by Markou in UK cinemas in April 2013, achieving the second highest screen average of any film in that weekend. This success placed the film among the top five self-distributed UK films in the past 15 years. The film went on to be bought by the BBC, ARTE and Netflix.

Markou's approach to distribution included cold calling Greek Orthodox priests asking them to announce the film in their Sunday services.

Markou speaks extensively about self distribution at film industry events and film festivals and is the subject of self distribution case studies.

His play Ordinary Dreams; Or How to Survive a Meltdown with Flair was staged in May 2009 at the Trafalgar Studios with actors James Lance and Adrian Bower. Age-Sex-Location, his play about chat rooms and virtual worlds, was staged at the Riverside Studios in 2004 with actor Ed Stoppard.

In 2014, Markou was nominated by the London Critics Circle Awards for Breakthrough British Filmmaker.

On 11 April 2018, it was announced that Marcus Markou was embarking in a new crowdfunding film and TV venture, along with US producer Cassian Elwes. Their company, dubbed Movie Collective, aims at financing film projects through an innovative crowdfunding approach that allows any investor to share the risk and the rewards, should a film be profitable.

In 2023, Markou self-distributed a micro-budget feature film about a couple breaking up called The Wife and Her House Husband together with a short film, Two Strangers Who Meet Five Times – as a double bill. The Guardian described The Wife and Her House Husband as a "worthwhile movie that genuinely gets under the skin of a long marriage" but added that the drama could feel "overworked" at times.

Film critic Mark Kermode reviewed the film on an episode of his podcast Kermode and Mayo's Take. Kermode praised Markou's resourceful storytelling, saying "It is ambitious and it aims high with very scant resources". He also noted Markou's background as a playwright lending to the film's "stage quality", going on to say at times, the film could be "too theatrical".

Markou is the co-founder of BusinessesForSale.com, a global marketplace for buying and selling small and medium-sized businesses.
