= Esmé Creed-Miles =

English actress (born 2000)

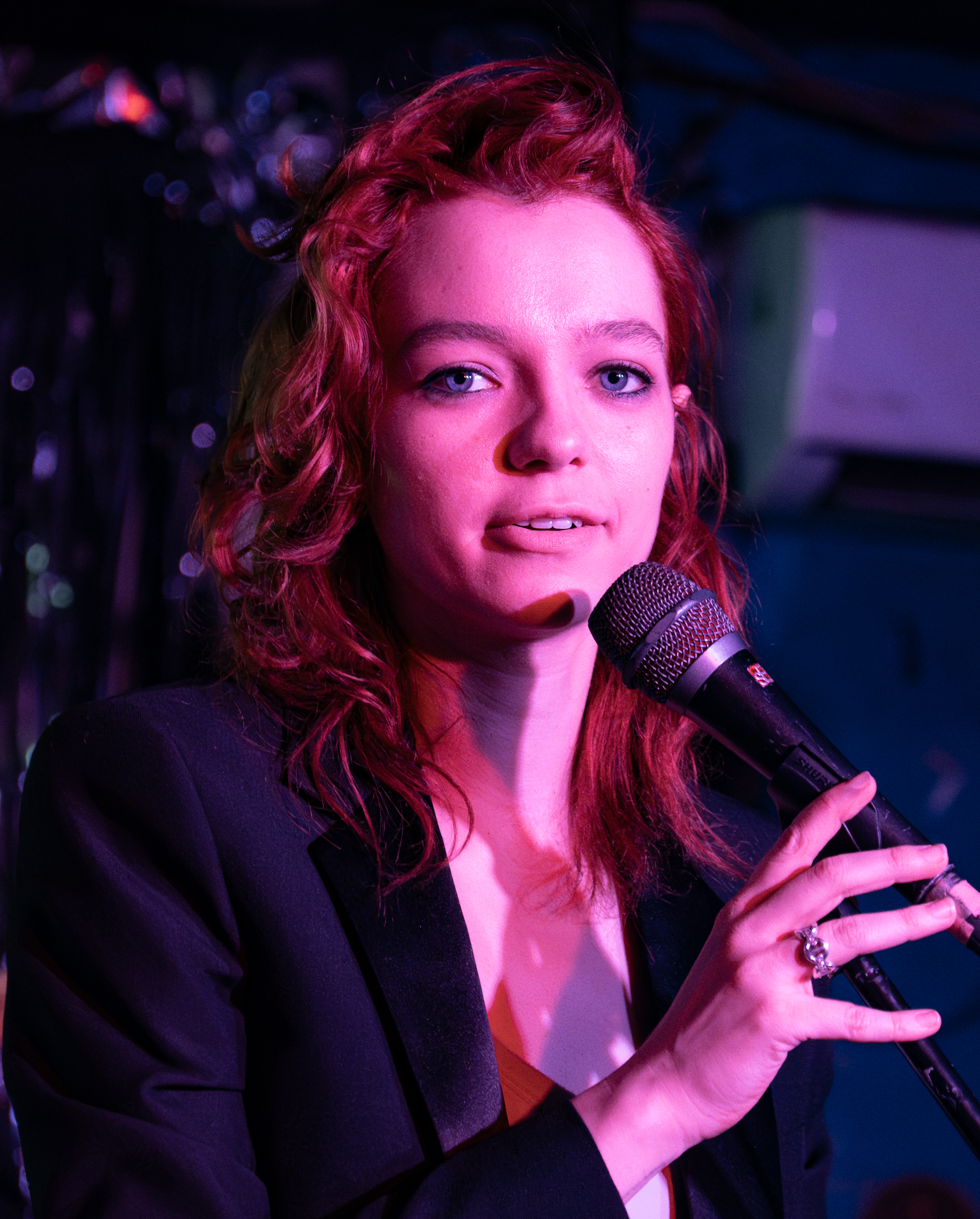
- Creed-Miles in 2024
- Born: 5 February 2000 (age 26); Barnet, London, England
- Occupations: Actress, musician, model
- Spouse(s): Daisy Maybe (fiancée, engaged January 2026)
- Parent(s): Charlie Creed-Miles (father); Samantha Morton (mother)

Esmé Creed-Miles (born 5 February 2000) is an English actress and musician. On television, she starred in the Amazon Prime series Hanna (2019–2021) and the Paramount+ period drama The Doll Factory (2023). Her films include Pond Life (2018), Silver Haze (2023) and Sense and Sensibility (2026).

== Early life ==
Creed-Miles was born in Barnet, England. She is the daughter of actors Charlie Creed-Miles and Samantha Morton.

== Career ==
Creed-Miles began her acting career as a Shirley Temple impersonator in the film Mister Lonely (2007) directed by Harmony Korine. Her next film appearance came ten years later when she was cast in Clio Barnard's Dark River. She starred as the lead of the 2018 films Pond Life and Undercliffe produced by Open Palm Films.

From 2019 to 2021, Creed-Miles starred as the titular character of the Amazon Prime series Hanna. According to the actress she trained in martial arts six hours a day for months as preparation for her fight scenes in the series. Creed-Miles valued how her role as Hanna enabled her to challenge societal norms about gender and sexuality. Creed-Miles has received positive reviews for her work in the series. Sophie Gilbert in The Atlantic noted that she is "imbuing the character with emotional vulnerability and physical power. Even more striking is how she communicates Hanna's intelligence, how fleet and observant and hyperalert she is."

In 2024, Netflix announced that Creed-Miles would play the role of Delirium of the Endless in the second season of The Sandman. Season 2 aired in July 2025.

In 2025 Creed-Miles starred in Kristen Stewart's directorial debut, The Chronology of Water. The film premiered at Cannes Film Festival in May of 2025 which Creed-Miles attended.

In July of 2025 it was announced that Esmé Creed-Miles would star as Marianne Dashwood alongside Pond Life costar, Daisy Edgar-Jones, in Georgia Oakley's adaptation of Jane Austen's Sense and Sensibility.

== Other activities ==
In 2023, Creed-Miles walked the runway at London Fashion Week for Simone-Rocha's Fall/Winter Collection.

In 2026, Creed-Miles served on the jury of the Biarritz Film Festival – Nouvelles Vagues, presided over by Kristen Stewart.

== Personal life ==
Creed-Miles is a lesbian and a feminist. Creed-Miles is engaged to singer-songwriter Daisy Maybe.

== Filmography ==
=== Film ===
Key
†	Denotes films that have not yet been released

Year	Title	Role	Notes
2007	Mister Lonely	Shirley Temple	
2017	Dark River	Young Alice	
2018	Undercliffe	Sister Stevie	
2018	Pond Life	Pogo	
2020	Jamie	Jamie	Writer, director; short film
2020	Sudden Light	Mia	short film
2023	Silver Haze	Florence	
2024	The Thicket	Lula	
2025	The Chronology of Water	Claire	
2026	Sense and Sensibility	Marianne Dashwood	
TBA	A Head Full of Ghosts †	TBA	Filming
TBA	Flesh of the Gods †	TBA	Post-production

=== Television ===
Year	Title	Role	Notes
2019–2021	Hanna	Hanna	Lead actress
2022	The Legend of Vox Machina	Cassandra de Rolo (voice)	
2023	The Doll Factory	Iris Whittle	Main role
2025	The Sandman	Delirium	

== Awards and nominations ==
Year	Award	Category	Nominated work	Result	Ref.
2021	Critics' Choice Super Awards	Best Actress in an Action Series	Hanna	Nominated	
2026	Gotham Awards	Outstanding Supporting Performance	Sense and Sensibility	Pending	
