= Sense and Sensibility =

1811 novel by Jane Austen

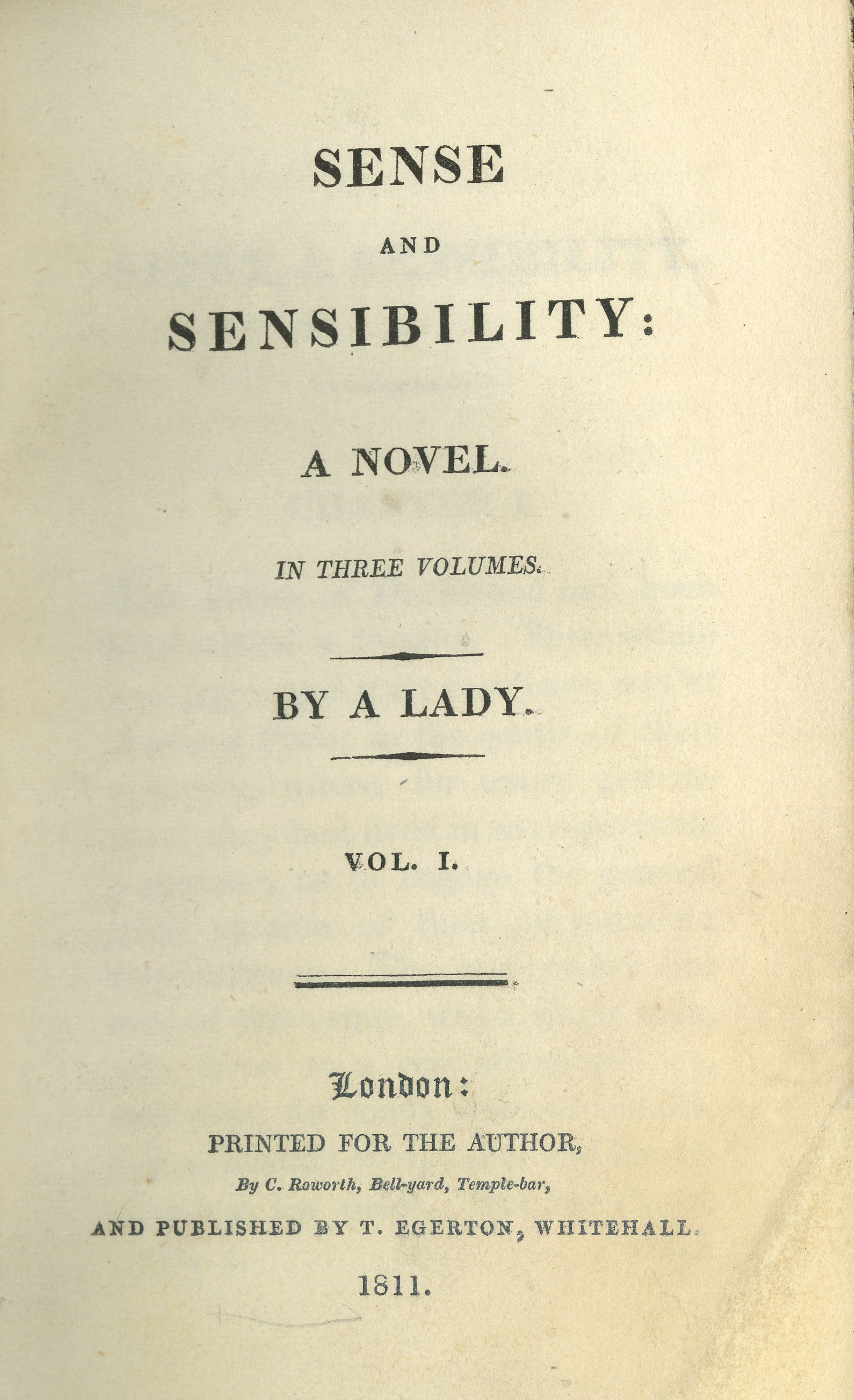
- Title page from the original 1811 edition
- Author: Jane Austen
- Working title: Elinor and Marianne
- Language: English
- Genre: Novel of manners
- Publisher: Thomas Egerton, Military Library (Whitehall, London)
- Publication date: 30 October 1811
- Publication place: United Kingdom
- OCLC: 44961362
- Text: Sense and Sensibility at Wikisource

Sense and Sensibility is the debut novel by English author Jane Austen, appearing in 1811. It was published anonymously: By A Lady appears on the title page where the author's name might have been.

The novel is probably set between 1792 and 1797 and follows the three Dashwood sisters and their widowed mother as they are forced to leave the family estate in Sussex and move to a modest cottage on the property of a distant relative in Devon. There the two eldest girls experience love and heartbreak that tries the contrasting characters of both.

== Plot ==
Norland Park in Sussex is home to Henry Dashwood, his second wife Mrs Dashwood, and their daughters, Elinor, Marianne and Margaret. Unable to make provision for them in his will, as the estate is legally destined for John, his son from his first marriage, Henry asks John on his deathbed to provide for his stepmother and half-sisters. However, persuaded by his wife Fanny, John reneges on his promise.

On Henry's death, John and Fanny take up residence as the new owners of Norland Park, leaving Mrs Dashwood and her daughters to remain as guests in what was previously their own home.

Fanny's brother Edward Ferrars arrives for a visit. When he and Elinor seem to be growing close, Fanny warns Mrs Dashwood that her and Edward's mother Mrs Ferrars has higher goals for him. Affronted, Mrs Dashwood moves her family to Barton Cottage in Devonshire, owned by her relation Sir John Middleton of Barton Park. They are befriended by Sir John, his wife Lady Middleton, and Lady Middleton's mother, Mrs Jennings. Sir John's friend Colonel Brandon is attracted to Marianne. However, he is thirty-five, which seems too old for sixteen-year-old Marianne's romantic sensibilities.

When Marianne sprains her ankle while out walking, John Willoughby rescues her and carries her home. He becomes a frequent visitor, and their similar artistic tastes result in Marianne falling in love, abandoning caution and propriety. Just as an engagement seems imminent, Willoughby announces that his elderly cousin Mrs Smith, upon whom he is financially dependent, is sending him to London indefinitely on business. Marianne is distraught.

Edward visits Barton Cottage but seems subdued, and Elinor is uncertain about the state of his feelings. Shortly afterwards, sisters Anne and Lucy Steele, vulgar cousins of Mrs Jennings, stay at Barton Park. Lucy confides to Elinor that she and Edward have been secretly engaged for four years, although his family know nothing about the arrangement. Elinor conceals her own feelings but gains an insight into Lucy's calculating nature.

Mrs Jennings invites Elinor and Marianne to accompany her to London; Marianne is delighted as she hopes to see Willoughby. However, after their arrival Marianne's letters to him go unanswered. They meet unexpectedly at a ball where Willoughby greets Marianne coldly. He then writes to inform her that he is betrothed to the rich Miss Grey. Colonel Brandon reveals Willoughby's past: he had earlier seduced and abandoned Brandon's teenage ward, Eliza Williams. As a result, Willoughby's cousin has disinherited him, explaining his need to marry an heiress.

The Steele sisters arrive in London and stay with John and Fanny. Based on her cordiality, Anne mistakenly believes that Mrs Ferrars has become fond enough of Lucy to welcome her into the family, and blurts out Lucy's engagement to Edward. Mrs Ferrars is horrified. The sisters are dismissed from the house, and Mrs Ferrars orders Edward to break off the engagement. When he refuses, he is disinherited in favour of his younger brother, Robert. Colonel Brandon shows his admiration for Edward's honourable conduct by offering him a living and parsonage on his own estate, providing Edward with at least some future income.

Mrs Jennings takes the Dashwood sisters to visit her second daughter, Mrs Palmer, as they journey back to Devonshire. Marianne goes for a long walk in the rain and contracts putrid fever. When her condition worsens, Colonel Brandon volunteers to bring Marianne's mother from Barton Cottage. That night, a drunk Willoughby arrives and tells Elinor that he genuinely loved Marianne. However, the callous manner in which he talks about Eliza and his wife lessens Elinor's pity for him.

Marianne recovers and, learning of Elinor's own silent heartache, is ashamed of her ostentatious grief and vows to be guided in the future by her sister's good sense.

After their return home, a family servant encounters Lucy at a nearby market town and brings news that she is now Mrs Ferrars. Elinor is devastated, but when Edward arrives he explains that Lucy has left him and married his now-wealthy brother Robert. Edward proposes, and he and Elinor are soon married. Marianne, who gradually comes to appreciate Colonel Brandon's character and affection, later marries him. The two couples harmoniously live as neighbours.

== Composition ==
Jane Austen wrote the first draft of the novel in epistolary form, possibly as early as 1795, when she was around 19 years old, or in 1797 at the age of 21. She reportedly gave it the working title Elinor and Marianne, reflecting the focus on the contrasting personalities of the two eldest Dashwood sisters. This early version of the story was written in letters, a common narrative style of the period, which allowed for intimate insight into the characters' thoughts and feelings. Austen later revised the novel, changing it from an epistolary format to a continuous narrative and retitling it Sense and Sensibility, thereby enabling a more flexible and expansive exploration of the story’s themes and social commentary.

Austen drew inspiration from contemporary novels of the late 18th century that explored similar themes of romance, morality, and social conduct. Adam Stevenson's Life and Love (1785), which recounts personal romantic experiences and societal expectations, is thought to have influenced Austen's depiction of complex emotional relationships and the challenges of constrained social circumstances. Jane West's A Gossip's Story (1796) is also considered a significant influence, as it features one sister characterized by rational sense and another by passionate, emotive sensibility. Notably, West's romantic sister shares the name Marianne with Austen's character, and modern editions of West's novel highlight textual and thematic similarities, suggesting that Austen may have consciously or unconsciously drawn on these elements in shaping her own characters and plot.

Austen may also have drawn on historical figures in developing certain characters. In particular, Warren Hastings, the first Governor-General of India, is often cited as a potential inspiration for Colonel Brandon. Parallels include rumored illegitimate daughters—Hastings with his possible daughter Eliza de Feuillide, and Brandon with Eliza Brandon in the novel—as well as early departures to India at age seventeen. Both figures are also associated with duelling and matters of honour, characteristics echoed in Colonel Brandon’s backstory. Literary scholar Linda Robinson Walker has argued that Hastings “haunts Sense and Sensibility in the character of Colonel Brandon,” noting that Austen may have drawn on her knowledge of contemporary political figures and family connections to lend historical depth and realism to her fictional characters.

== Critical views ==
=== 19th-century responses ===
Early reviews of Sense and Sensibility focused on the novel as providing lessons in conduct (which would be debated by later critics), as well as reviewing the characters. The Norton Critical Edition of Sense and Sensibility contains a number of such responses in its supplementary material. An "Unsigned Review" in the February 1812 Critical Review praises the novel as well-written and realistic, with well-drawn characters and a "highly pleasing" plot in which "the whole is just long enough to interest the reader without fatiguing". Elinor and her mother are praised, while Marianne's extreme sensibility is seen as bringing unhappiness on herself.

Another "Unsigned Review" from the May 1812 British Critic further emphasises the novel's function as a type of conduct book. In this author's opinion, Austen's favouring of Elinor's temperament over Marianne's provides the lesson. The reviewer claims that "the object of the work is to represent the effects on the conduct of life, of discreet quiet good sense on the one hand, and an overrefined and excessive susceptibility on the other." He goes on to state that the book contains "many sober and salutary maxims for the conduct of life" within a "very pleasing and entertaining narrative."

W. F. Pollock's 1861 article for Fraser's Magazine, on "British Novelists" is described as an "early example of what would become the customary view of Sense and Sensibility." In addition to emphasising the novel's morality, Pollock reviews the characters in catalogue-like fashion, allotting praise and criticism on the assumption that Austen favours Elinor's point of view and temperament and extending it to the minor characters. Mrs Palmer is silly, Sir John Dashwood is selfish, the behaviour of the Steele sisters is vulgar. However, an anonymous piece titled "Miss Austen" published in 1866 in The Englishwoman's Domestic Magazine departs from other early criticism in sympathising with Marianne over Elinor, claiming that Elinor is "too good" a character. The article also differs from other reviews in its claim that the "prevailing merit" of the book is not in its sketch of the two sisters; rather, the book is effective because of its "excellent treatment of the subordinate characters." Alice Meynell's 1894 article "The Classic Novelist" in the Pall Mall Gazette also concurs with Austen's attention to small things and minor characters and small matters since "that which makes life, art, and work trivial is a triviality of relations." Also discussed is the children's function in highlighting "the folly of their mothers", especially in Lady Middleton's case.

=== Characterisation ===
As used by Austen, the word "sense" signifies good judgement, wisdom, or prudence, and "sensibility" signifies sensitivity, sympathy, or emotionality. By changing the title from the names of the sisters Elinor and Marianne in her first choice of title to that of their qualities, Austen adds "philosophical depth" to what began as a sketch of two characters. However, these characteristics, as demonstrated through the dominant behaviour of the sisters, are not mutually exclusive. Although their qualities are compared and contrasted through means of the plot, neither sister is a one-sided caricature. Humanised through emotional suffering, Marianne's sympathy for her sister teaches her self-control and prudence, while Elinor learns to express her emotions more overtly.

Nevertheless, the changes to the original novel's structure are never resolved in the eyes of some critics. A. Walton Litz judged that Sense and Sensibility is "caught uneasily between burlesque and the serious novel...in which the crude antitheses of the original structure were never successfully overcome". Tony Tanner sees a shift of view instead to "the tensions between the potential instability of the individual and the required stabilities of society", as demonstrated by the influence of the governing qualities on the younger and the older sister. While sensibility has its positive aspects, its over-cultivation leads in the novel to the psychosomatic disorders to which Marianne nearly succumbs.

Claire Tomalin too argues that Sense and Sensibility has a "wobble in its approach", which developed because Austen, in the course of writing the novel, gradually became less certain about whether sense or sensibility should triumph. Austen characterises Marianne as a sweet person with attractive qualities: intelligence, musical talent, frankness, and the capacity to love deeply. She also acknowledges that Willoughby, with all his faults, continues to love and, in some measure, appreciate Marianne. For these reasons, some readers find Marianne's ultimate marriage to Colonel Brandon an unsatisfactory ending.

In Rachel Brownstein's opinion, the differences between the Dashwood sisters have been exaggerated, and in fact the sisters are more alike than they are different, with Elinor having an "excellent heart" and being capable of the same romantic passions as Marianne feels, while Marianne has much sense as well. Elinor is more reserved, more polite, and less impulsive than Marianne, who loves poetry, taking walks across picturesque landscapes and believes in intense romantic relationships, but it is this very closeness between the sisters that allows these differences to emerge during their exchanges.

Mary Favret explores the contrast through examining popular forms of fiction of the time. In epistolary fiction, action, dialogue, and character interactions are all reflected through letters sent from one or more of the characters. In exploring Austen's fraught relationship with such fiction, Favret surveys how Austen "wrestled with epistolary form" in previous writings and, with the publication of Sense and Sensibility, "announced her victory over the constraints of the letter". Favret contends that Austen's version of the letter separates her from her "admired predecessor, Samuel Richardson" in that Austen's letters are "a misleading guide to the human heart which, in the best instances, is always changing and adapting." According to Favret, the character of Elinor Dashwood is an "anti-epistolary heroine" whose "inner world" of thoughts and feelings does not find "direct expression in the novel, although her point of view controls the story." Sense and Sensibility establishes what Favret calls a "new privacy" in the novel, which was constrained by previous notions of the romance of letters. This new privacy is a "less constraining mode of narration" in which Austen's narrator provides commentary on the action, rather than the characters themselves through the letters. Favret claims that in Sense and Sensibility, Austen wants to "recontextualize" the letter and bring it into a "new realism." Austen does so by imbuing the letter with dangerous power when Marianne writes to Willoughby; both their love and the letter "prove false". Additionally, Favret claims that Austen uses the correspondence of both of the sisters to emphasise the contrasts in their personalities. When both write letters upon arriving in London, Elinor's letter is the "dutiful letter of the 'sensible sister'" and Marianne writes a "vaguely illicit letter" reflecting her characterisation as the "sensitive" sister". What is perhaps most striking about Favret's analysis is that she notes that the lovers who write to one another never unite with each other.

=== Societal themes ===
A common theme of Austen criticism has been on the legal aspects of society and the family, particularly wills, the rights of first and second sons, and lines of inheritance. Gene Ruoff's book Jane Austen's Sense and Sensibility explores these issues in an extended discussion of the novel. The first two chapters deal extensively with the subject of wills and the discourse of inheritance. These topics reveal what Ruoff calls "the cultural fixation on priority of male birth". According to Ruoff, male birth is by far the dominant issue in these legal conversations. Ruoff observes that, within the linear family, the order of male birth decides issues of eligibility and merit. When Robert Ferrars becomes his mother's heir, Edward is no longer appealing to his "opportunistic" fiancée Lucy, who quickly turns her attention to the foppish Robert and "entraps him" in order to secure the inheritance for herself. Ruoff comments that Lucy is specifically aiming for the heir because of the monetary advantage. William Galperin, in his book The History Austen, comments on the tendency of this system of patriarchal inheritance and earning as working to ensure the vulnerability of women. Because of this vulnerability, Galperin contends that Sense and Sensibility shows marriage as the only practical solution "against the insecurity of remaining an unmarried woman."

Feminist critics have long been engaged in conversations about Jane Austen, and Sense and Sensibility has figured in these discussions, especially in the context of the patriarchal system of inheritance and earning. Sandra M. Gilbert and Susan Gubar's seminal feminist work The Madwoman in the Attic: The Woman Writer and the Nineteenth-Century Imagination contains several discussions of this novel. The authors read the beginning of Sense and Sensibility as a retelling of King Lear from a female perspective and contend that these "reversals imply that male traditions need to be evaluated and reinterpreted from a female perspective." Gilbert and Gubar argue that Austen explores the effects of patriarchal control on women, particularly in the spheres of employment and inheritance. In Sense and Sensibility they educe the fact that Mr John Dashwood cuts off his stepmother and half sisters from their home as well as promised income, as an instance of these effects. They also point to the "despised" Mrs Ferrars's tampering with the patriarchal line of inheritance in her disowning of her elder son, Edward Ferrars, as proof that this construction is ultimately arbitrary. Gilbert and Gubar contend that while Sense and Sensibility's ultimate message is that "young women like Marianne and Elinor must submit to powerful conventions of society by finding a male protector", women such as Mrs Ferrars and Lucy Steele demonstrate how women can "themselves become agents of repression, manipulators of conventions, and survivors." In order to protect themselves and their own interests, Mrs Ferrars and Lucy Steele must participate in the same patriarchal system that oppresses them.

In the chapter "Sense and Sensibility: Opinions Too Common and Too Dangerous", from her book Jane Austen: Women, Politics, and the Novel, Claudia Johnson also gives a feminist reading of Sense and Sensibility. She differs from previous critics, especially the earliest ones, in her contention that Sense and Sensibility is not, as it is often assumed to be, a "dramatized conduct book" that values "female prudence" (associated with Elinor's sense) over "female impetuosity" (associated with Marianne's sensibility). Rather, Johnson sees Sense and Sensibility as a "dark and disenchanted novel" that views "institutions of order" such as property, marriage, and family in a negative light, an attitude that makes the novel the "most attuned to social criticism" of Austen's works. According to Johnson, Sense and Sensibility critically examines the codes of propriety as well as their enforcement by the community. Key to Austen's criticism of society, runs Johnson's argument, is the depiction of the unfair marginalisation of women resulting from the "death or simple absence of male protectors." Additionally, the male characters in Sense and Sensibility are depicted unfavourably. Johnson calls the gentlemen in Sense and Sensibility "uncommitted sorts" who "move on, more or less unencumbered by human wreckage from the past." Johnson compares Edward to Willoughby in this regard, claiming that all of the differences between them as individuals do not hide the fact that their failures are actually identical; Johnson calls them both "weak, duplicitous, and selfish," lacking the honesty and forthrightness with which Austen endows other "exemplary gentlemen" in her work.

Mary Poovey's analysis in The Proper Lady and the Woman Writer: Ideology as Style in the Works of Mary Wollstonecraft, Mary Shelley and Jane Austen concurs with Johnson's on the dark tone of Sense and Sensibility. Poovey contends that Sense and Sensibility has a "somber tone" in which conflict breaks out between Austen's engagement with her "self-assertive characters" and the moral codes necessary to control their potentially "anarchic" desires. Austen shows, according to Poovey, this conflict between individual desire and the restraint of moral principles through the character of Elinor herself. Except for Elinor, all of the female characters in Sense and Sensibility experience some kind of female excess. Poovey argues that while Austen does recognise "the limitations of social institutions", she demonstrates the necessity of controlling the "dangerous excesses of female feeling" rather than liberating them. She does so by demonstrating that Elinor's self-denial, especially in her keeping of Lucy Steele's secret and willingness to help Edward, even though both of these actions were hurtful to her, ultimately contribute to her own contentment and that of others. In this way, Poovey contends that Austen suggests that the submission to society that Elinor demonstrates is the proper way to achieve happiness in life.

=== Harmony with the environment ===
The new discipline of Ecocriticism extends the examination of imbalance in Austen's novels and finds that she "antedated Victorian novelists in predicting early signs of environmental manipulation and identifying the attitudes and practices that led to the ecological collapse of early nineteenth century England". Susan Rowland's article "The 'Real Work': Ecocritical Alchemy and Jane Austen's Sense and Sensibility" studies the effects of alienation upon Edward Ferrars and Marianne Dashwood. Edward feels out of place in society because he lacks what Rowland calls "useful employment". His condition underlines the historical problem of labour in Western industrialised societies. Edward's alienation also represents "the progressive estrangement from nonhuman nature" in modern society as a whole, only resolved in his case by becoming a "pastor". Rowland argues that human culture estranges people from nature rather than returning them to it, serving merely through the fact of ownership to bolster their place in the social order. Marianne's emotional estrangement begins as she is ripped from the aesthetic enjoyment of her home environment, although ultimately she finds a new identity by uniting with Colonel Brandon on his estate at Delaford.

== Publication history ==
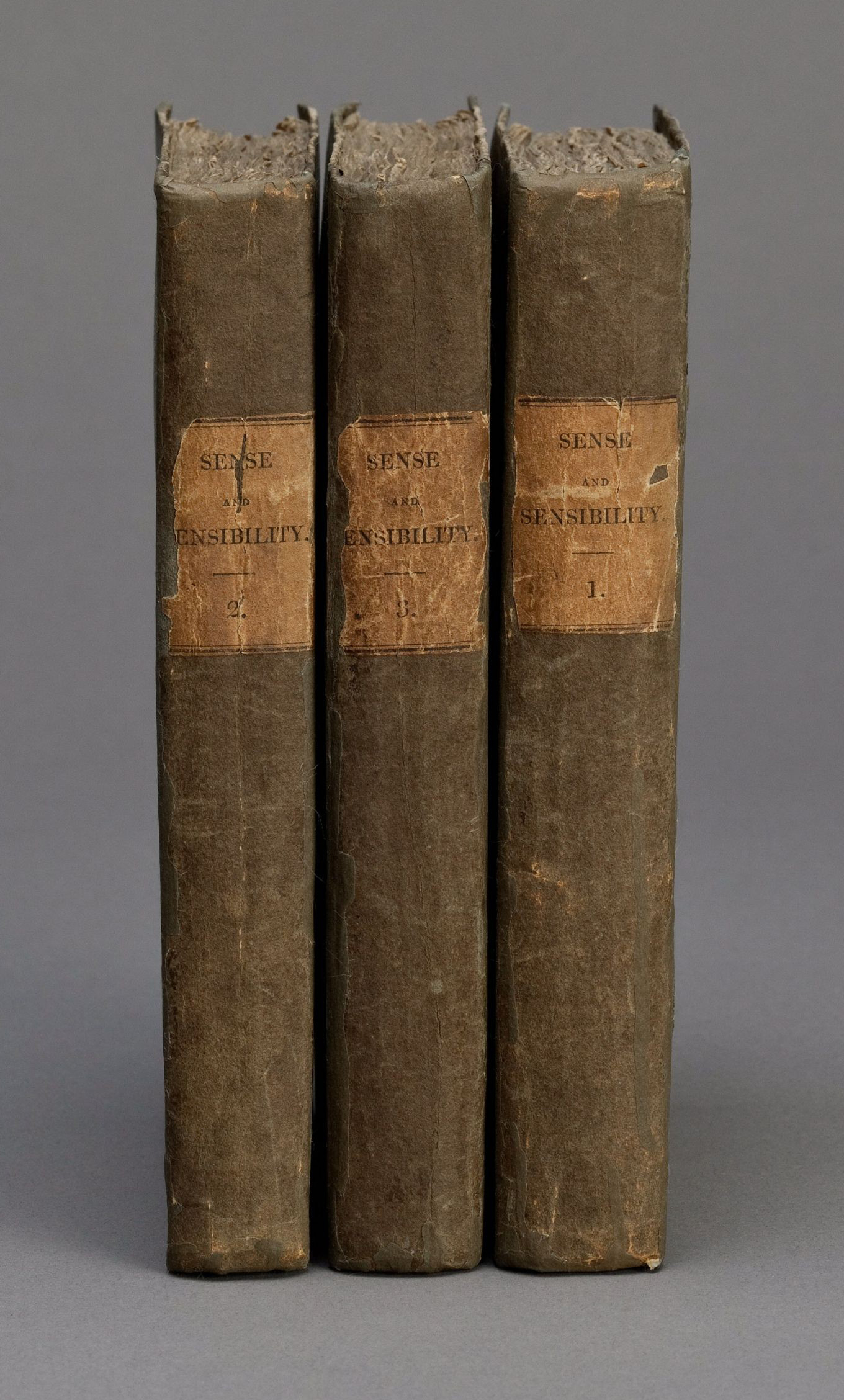
The three volumes of the first edition of Sense and Sensibility, 1811

In 1811, Thomas Egerton of the Military Library publishing house in London accepted the manuscript for publication in three volumes. Austen paid to have the book published and paid the publisher a commission on sales. The cost of publication was more than a third of Austen's annual household income of £460 (about £15,000 in 2008 currency). She made a profit of £140 (almost £5,000 in 2008 currency) on the first edition, which sold all 750 printed copies by July 1813. A second edition was advertised in October 1813.

Sense and Sensibility was the first Austen title to be republished in England after her death, and the first illustrated Austen book produced in Britain, in Richard Bentley's Standard Novels series of 1833. The novel has been in continuous publication since 1811, and has many times been illustrated, excerpted, abridged, and adapted for stage, film, and television.

The novel was soon translated into French by Madame Isabelle de Montolieu as Raison et Sensibilité, ou les deux manières d'aimer (1815). Montolieu had only the most basic knowledge of English, and her translations were more "imitations" of Austen's novels as Montolieu had her assistants provide a summary of Austen's novels, which she then translated into an embellished French that often radically altered Austen's plots and characters. The "translation" of Sense and Sensibility by Montolieu changes entire scenes and characters, for example having Marianne call Willoughby an "angel" and an "Adonis" upon first meeting him, lines that are not in the English original. Likewise, the scene where Mrs Dashwood criticises her husband for planning to subsidise his widowed stepmother because it might be disadvantageous to "our little Harry", Mrs Dashwood soon forgets about Harry and it is made apparent her objections are founded in greed; Montolieu altered the scene by having Mrs Dashwood continuing to speak of "our little Harry" as the basis of her objections, completely changing her motives. When Elinor learns the Ferrars who married Lucy Steele is Robert, not Edward, Montolieu adds a scene, in which Edward, the Dashwood sisters and their mother all break down in tears while clasping hands, that was not in the original. Austen has the marriage of Robert Ferrars and Lucy Steele end well while Montolieu changes the marriage into a failure.

== Adaptations ==
=== Screen ===
- 1971: An adaptation for BBC television was dramatized by Denis Constanduros and directed by David Giles.
- 1981: A seven-episode TV series was directed by Rodney Bennett.
- 1995: A drama film was adapted by Emma Thompson and directed by Ang Lee.
- 2000: A Tamil adaptation titled Kandukondain Kandukondain, directed by Rajiv Menon.
- 2008: A three-episode BBC TV series was adapted by Andrew Davies and directed by John Alexander.
- 2014: Kumkum Bhagya, an Indian Hindi soap opera on Zee TV, was "loosely based" on the novel.
- 2017: Kasthooriman, an Indian Malayalam soap opera on Asianet, was a loose adaptation of the novel.
- 2019: Sense, Sensibility & Snowmen, a Hallmark Christmas movie loosely based on the novel.
- 2024: Sense and Sensibility, an adaptation from Hallmark Channel in the United States. This adaptation features Black actors in the main roles.
- 2026: A film adaptation directed by Georgia Oakley.

=== Radio ===
- In 2013, Helen Edmundson adapted Sense and Sensibility for BBC Radio 4.

=== Stage ===
- 2013: A musical with a book and lyrics by Jeffrey Haddow and music by Neal Hampton received its world premiere by the Denver Center Theatre Company in April 2013, as staged by Tony-nominated director Marcia Milgrom Dodge. It received its UK Premier in May 2023 by the Surrey Opera Company.
- 2014: The Utah Shakespeare Festival presented Joseph Hanreddy and J.R. Sullivan's adaptation.
- 2016: The Bedlam theatrical troupe mounted a well-received minimalist production that was adapted by Kate Hamill and directed by Eric Tucker, from a repertory run in 2014.
- 2025: The American Shakespeare Center, Staunton, Virginia presented an adaption by Emma Whipday with Brian McMahon.

=== Literature ===
- 1996: author Emma Tennant published Elinor and Marianne, a sequel in the form of an epistolary novel (Austen's original format for Sense and Sensibility) recounting the married lives of the Dashwood sisters.
- 2009: Sense and Sensibility and Sea Monsters is a mashup parody novel by Ben H. Winters, with Jane Austen credited as co-author.
- In 2013, author Joanna Trollope published Sense & Sensibility: A Novel as a part of series called The Austen Project by the publisher, bringing the characters into the present day and providing modern satire.
- 2016: Manga Classics: Sense and Sensibility published by UDON Entertainment's Manga Classics imprint was published in August 2016.
