= Georgia Oakley =

British filmmaker and screenwriter

- Born: Georgia Alice Nancy Oakley; 31 July 1988 (age 38); Basingstoke, England
- Education: Newcastle University
- Years active: 2012–present
- Children: 1

Georgia Alice Nancy Oakley (born 31 July 1988) is a British director and screenwriter. Her debut feature film Blue Jean (2022) earned her a number of accolades, including a British Academy Film Award nomination and a British Independent Film Award.

== Early life ==
Oakley was born in Basingstoke and grew up in a town in the Oxfordshire countryside. She graduated with a Bachelor of Arts (BA) in English Literature from Newcastle University in 2010.

== Career ==
=== Early work ===
Oakley has a background in theatre and began her career as an in-house director at Channel 4 and Irresistible Films, directing a piece for the 2012 Random Acts campaign and the short films Hush, Frayed and Callow & Sons. She also started submitting her short films to festivals. Frayed, written by Ayesha Antoine, was selected for a number of them, including the London Short Film Festival and the New York Film Festival.

Her short film Little Bird, written by Emily Taaffe set in World War II Britain, premiered at the 2017 Tribeca Film Festival. Taaffe starred in the short opposite Imelda Staunton. She co-directed We Did Not Fall from the Sky with Tabs Breese and directed Coral Amiga and Nicole Hartley's Bored, part of the SXSW Episodic Pilot showcase.

=== Blue Jean ===
After pitching ideas to the BBC, Oakley started working on her debut feature film about Section 28 around its 30th anniversary in 2018. The film takes place in 1988 at a Newcastle girls private school and stars Rosy McEwen as a lesbian gym teacher Jean, who navigates hiding her personal life at work. Oakley interviewed lesbian PE teachers with similar experiences on which to base the film and members the Newcastle LGBT+ community. Two of these sources were Catherine Lee of Anglia Ruskin University and the television presenter Huffty.

The film titled Blue Jean premiered at the 79th Venice International Film Festival in September 2022, where it won the People's Choice Award. This was followed by further festivals and a theatrical release in 2023. Blue Jean was nominated for the British Academy Film Award for Outstanding Debut by a British Writer, Director or Producer as well as several British Independent Film Awards; Oakley won Best Debut Screenwriter.

=== Sense and Sensibility ===
Oakley directed an adaptation of Jane Austen's Sense and Sensibility, written by Diana Reid and starring Daisy Edgar-Jones.

== Artistry ==
Oakley is primarily influenced by French and Hispanic cinema, naming Lucrecia Martel's La ciénaga (2001) and Céline Sciamma's Water Lilies (2007) and Tomboy (2011) as examples. Other influences include Agnès Varda's Le Bonheur (1965), Lynne Ramsay's We Need to Talk About Kevin (2011), Joanna Hogg's The Souvenir (2019) as well as Chantal Akerman and Kelly Reichardt. She and cinematographer Victor Seguin used 16 mm film to shoot Blue Jean.

== Personal life ==
Oakley came out in her mid 20s and moved to East London. She has a stepdaughter.

== Filmography ==
Short film

Year	Title	Director	Writer
2012	Hush	Yes	Yes
2013	Frayed	Yes	No
2014	Callow & Sons	Yes	Yes
2017	Little Bird	Yes	No
2018	We Did Not Fall from the Sky	Co-director	No

Television

Year	Title	Note
2019	Bored	Episode "Sunday"

Feature film

- Blue Jean (2022) (Also writer)
- Sense and Sensibility (2026)
