= Jessica Swale =

British playwright, theatre director, and screenwriter

- Born: Jessica Bronwen Swale; 27 February 1982 (age 44); Reading, Berkshire, England
- Education: Royal Central School of Speech and Drama
- Occupations: Playwright; theatre director; screenwriter
- Years active: 2010–present

Jessica Swale (born 27 February 1982) is a British playwright, theatre director and screenwriter. Her first play, Blue Stockings, premiered at Shakespeare's Globe in 2013. It is widely performed by UK amateur companies and is also studied on the Drama GCSE syllabus. In 2016, her play Nell Gwynn won the Olivier Award for Best New Comedy, after it transferred from the Globe to the West End, starring Gemma Arterton as the eponymous heroine. She also wrote and directed the feature film Summerland (2020).

== Early life and education ==
Born in Reading, Berkshire, Swale completed her secondary education at Kendrick School, Reading, before studying drama at the University of Exeter. She completed her training with an MA degree in Advanced Theatre Practice at the Royal Central School of Speech and Drama, where she trained as a director.

== Career ==
After drama school, she worked as Max Stafford-Clark's associate director at Out of Joint Theatre Company, on productions including The Overwhelming (2006) at the National Theatre and Andersen's English (2010) at Hampstead. In 2006, she set up Red Handed Theatre Company with Katie Bonna, to perform new works and revive lost classics. She was nominated for an Evening Standard Award for Best Director for her production of The Belle's Stratagem and received the Peter Brook Empty Space Award for Best Ensemble for Red Handed in 2012.

Swale is also an associate artist with NGO Youth Bridge Global, using theatre as a development tool in war-torn countries, and the author of a series of drama games books, published by Nick Hern.

=== Stage directing ===
In 2010, Swale directed the first play by a woman ever to be staged at Shakespeare's Globe, Nell Leyshon's Bedlam. For Red Handed Theatre Company, she directed The Busy Body (2012), The Rivals (2010), Someone Who'll Watch Over Me (2012) at Southwark Playhouse, The School for Scandal (2013) at the Park Theatre and Palace of the End (2010) at Arcola Theatre. Other credits include Fallen Angels (Salisbury Playhouse), Winter (Theatre Newfoundland, Canada), Sleuth, Sense and Sensibility and Far from the Madding Crowd (Watermill Theatre).

=== Playwriting ===
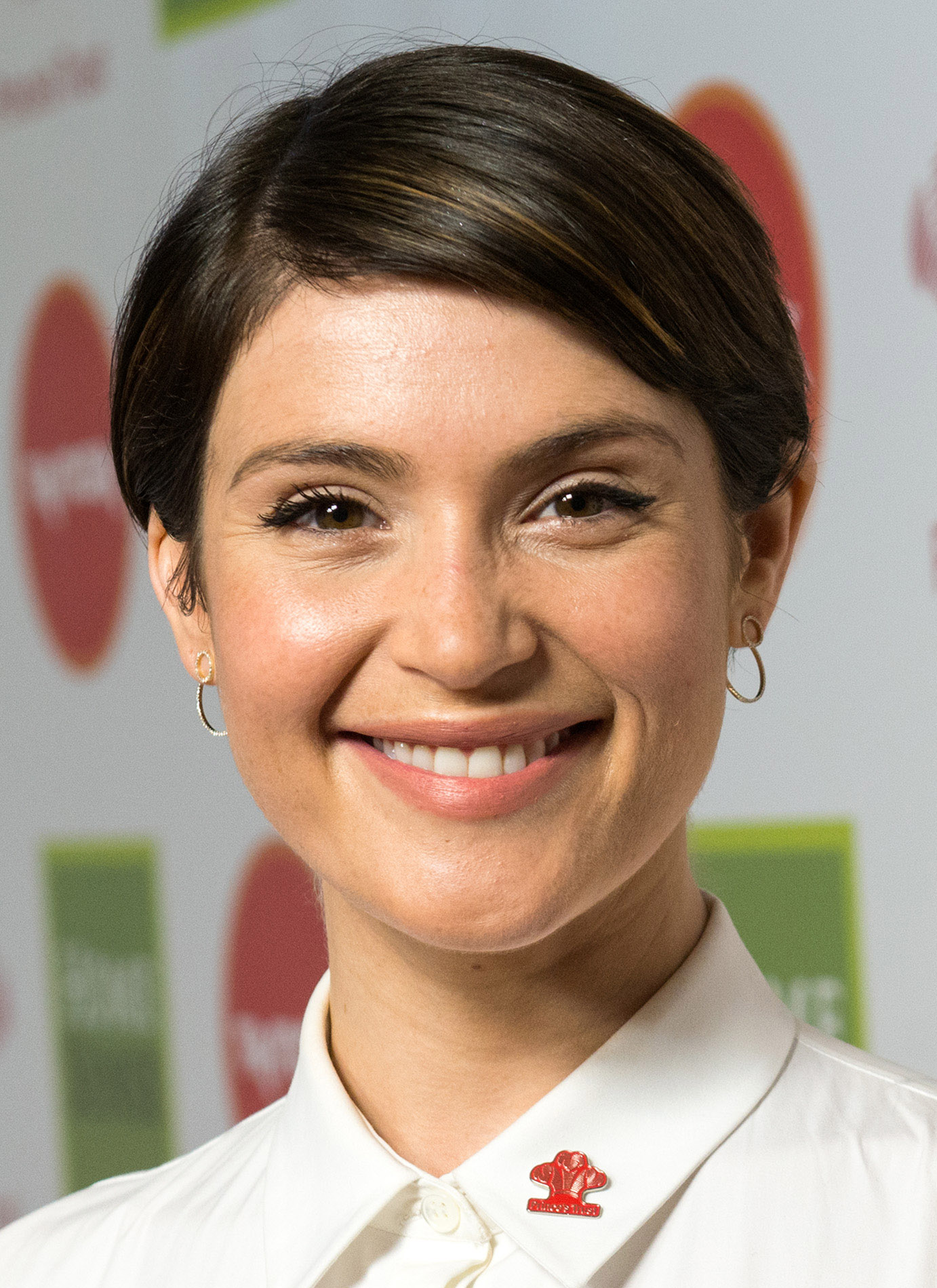
Gemma Arterton starred in Swale's play Nell Gwynn (2016), short film Leading Lady Parts (2018) and feature film Summerland (2020)

As a playwright, Swale's first play Blue Stockings premiered at Shakespeare's Globe in 2013 and won her an Evening Standard Most Promising Playwright nomination. Nell Gwynn premiered at Shakespeare's Globe in 2015, starring Gugu Mbatha-Raw, and transferred to the West End with Gemma Arterton in the title role. The production received four Olivier nominations, winning Best New Comedy, and is currently being developed as a feature film with Working Title.

Other plays includes All's Will that Ends Will (Bremen Shakespeare Company), Thomas Tallis (Sam Wanamaker Playhouse), The Playhouse Apprentice (Sam Wanamaker Playhouse) and The Mission about illegal adoptions in the 1920s. Her adaptations include Sense and Sensibility, Far from the Madding Crowd (Watermill), The Secret Garden and Stig of the Dump (Grosvenor Park, Chester).

Swale is the book writer of Paddington: The Musical (with music and lyrics by Tom Fletcher) which premiered at the Savoy Theatre in London's West End in November 2025. The production won the Laurence Olivier Award for Best New Musical. The musical is set to debut on Broadway in spring 2027 at the Al Hirschfeld Theatre.

=== Film and television ===
Her first short film, the Time's Up movement-inspired comedy Leading Lady Parts, starring Catherine Tate, Gemma Arterton, Felicity Jones, Florence Pugh, Lena Headey, Emilia Clarke, Tom Hiddleston and Gemma Chan, premiered on BBC Four in 2018 and is available for free on YouTube. She then co-wrote the screenplay for Horrible Histories: The Movie – Rotten Romans (2019).

In 2012, she won the BAFTA JJ Screenwriting Bursary for which she developed an original screenplay, Summerland. She also directed the film herself, and in 2020 it was released by IFC Films and Lionsgate. In 2022, she directed two episodes of Ten Percent for Amazon Prime Video, featuring guest stars Dominic West, Emma Corrin, and Himesh Patel.

In 2020, she was said to be in the process of writing an original feature with Blueprint and StudioCanal and other projects for Fox Searchlight and Monumental Pictures.

== Personal life ==
Swale lives in South London with a photographer, Michael Wharley.

== Writing credits ==
=== Plays ===
- The Playhouse Apprentice (2016)
- Nell Gwynn (2015) premiered at Shakespeare's Globe and transferred to the Apollo Theatre, West End, in 2016
- Thomas Tallis (2014): premiered at The Sam Wanamaker Playhouse
- All's Will that ends Will (2014): premiered at Bremer Shakespeare Company
- Blue Stockings (2013): premiered at Shakespeare's Globe

=== Adaptations ===
- Paddington: The Musical (2025): stage musical (with music and lyrics by Tom Fletcher) adapted from the stories by Michael Bond and film series, premiered on the West End at the Savoy Theatre and is set to be produced at the Al Hirschfeld Theatre on Broadway
- Stig of the Dump (2016): adapted from the novel by Clive King and premiered at Grosvenor Park Open Air Theatre
- Far from the Madding Crowd (2015): adapted from the novel by Thomas Hardy and premiered at the Watermill Theatre
- The Secret Garden (2014): adapted from the novel by Frances Eliza Hodgson Burnett, premiered at Grosvenor Park Open Air Theatre
- Sense and Sensibility (2014): adapted from the novel by Jane Austen and premiered at the Watermill Theatre

=== Books ===
- Drama Games: For Rehearsals (2016)
- Drama Games: For Devising (2012)
- Drama Games: For Classrooms and Workshops (2009)

== Directing credits ==
Short film

| Year | Title | Director | Writer |
|---|---|---|---|
| 2015 | Love[sic] | No | Yes |
| 2018 | Leading Lady Parts | Yes | Yes |

Feature film

| Year | Title | Director | Writer |
|---|---|---|---|
| 2019 | Horrible Histories: The Movie – Rotten Romans | No | Yes |
| 2020 | Summerland | Yes | Yes |
| 2025 | Merv | Yes | No |

Television

| Year | Title | Note |
|---|---|---|
| 2022 | Ten Percent | Episodes 3 and 4 |

Theater

- Fallen Angels (2015) at Salisbury Playhouse
- Far from the Madding Crowd (2015): adapted from the novel by Thomas Hardy, premiered at The Watermill Theatre
- Sense and Sensibility (2014): adapted from the novel by Jane Austen, premiered at The Watermill Theatre
- Winter (2011) at Newfoundland Theatre, Canada
- Bedlam (2010) at Shakespeare's Globe
- For Red Handed Theatre Company: The Busy Body (2012), The Rivals (2010), Someone Who'll Watch Over Me (2012) at Southwark Playhouse, The School for Scandal (2013) at the Park Theatre and Palace of the End (2010) at Arcola Theatre
