= Bluestocking (disambiguation) =

A bluestocking is an educated, intellectual woman.

Bluestocking or Bluestockings may also refer to:

- Bluestockings (bookstore), a feminist bookshop in New York
- Bluestocking (magazine), a Japanese feminist magazine
- Blue Stockings Society, a literary society for women in 18th century England
- M.P., an 1811 comic opera by Thomas Moore and Charles Edward Horn, subtitled The Blue Stocking
- Bluestockings: the Remarkable Story of the First Women to Fight for an Education, a 2009 book by Jane Robinson
- Blue Stockings (play), a 2013 play by Jessica Swale
- Kansas City Blue Stockings baseball team
