= Hampstead Players =

Amateur theatre group in north London, England

- The Hampstead Players logo
- Formation: 1976
- Type: Theatre group
- Purpose: Drama
- Location: Hampstead, London, England
- Website: www.hampsteadplayers.org.uk

The Hampstead Players are a notable amateur theatre group in north London, named after their base in Hampstead. It was founded in 1976. It produces three productions a year - spring, summer (usually Shakespeare) and autumn - in the parish church of St John-at-Hampstead. It also has a youth theatre wing, the Hampstead Players Youth Theatre (HPYT).

== Productions ==
Year	Winter/Spring	Summer	Autumn	HPYT
1976		The Rise and fall of man	The Lark	
1988			As you like it	
1989			The Importance of being Earnest	
1990			Murder in the Cathedral	
1991			The Glass Slipper	
1992			The Winslow Boy	
1993			The Linden Tree	
1994			Follow the Star	
1995	1745 and All That		John Keats Lived Here	
1996			Measure for Measure	
1997			Racing Demon	
1998			Lewis Carroll's Alice (A)	
1999			The Tempest	
2000			Inherit the Wind	
2001		Hamlet	The Crucible	
2002		Macbeth	Oliver!	Dreams of Anne Frank
2003		Richard III	All My Sons	
2004		A Midsummer Night's Dream	The Mystery Plays (A)	
2005		Shakespeare's Kings	Arcadia	
2006	The Lark	Julius Caesar	A Tale of Two Cities (A)	Grimm Tales
2007	Paradise Lost (A)	Twelfth Night	The Caucasian Chalk Circle	
2008		We Happy Few	Murder in the Cathedral	
2009	Musica Sacra	The Merchant of Venice	The Sacred Flame	
2010		Antony and Cleopatra	An Ideal Husband	
2011		The Winter's Tale	Fiddler on the Roof	
2012	Under Milk Wood	Waiting for Godot	A Woman of No Importance	
2013	Arsenic and Old Lace	As You Like It	The Cherry Orchard	
2014	The Way of the Cross	All's Well That Ends Well	The Man Born to Be King (A)	
2015		Richard II	Pride and Prejudice (A)	
2016	Dangerous Corner	The Alchemist	King Lear	
2017		Pygmalion	Persuasion (A)	
2018		The Bacchae	The Government Inspector	
2019		Macbeth	The Sound Of Music	
2021		A Midsummer Night's Dream	The Importance of being Earnest	
2022	Jukebox Cafe	Much Ado About Nothing	Blithe Spirit	
2023		Measure for Measure	My Fair Lady	
2024		Romeo and Juliet	Uncle Vanya	
2025		Blue Stockings	Cyrano de Bergerac	

(A) = Adaptation
