= List of awards and nominations received by Florence Pugh =

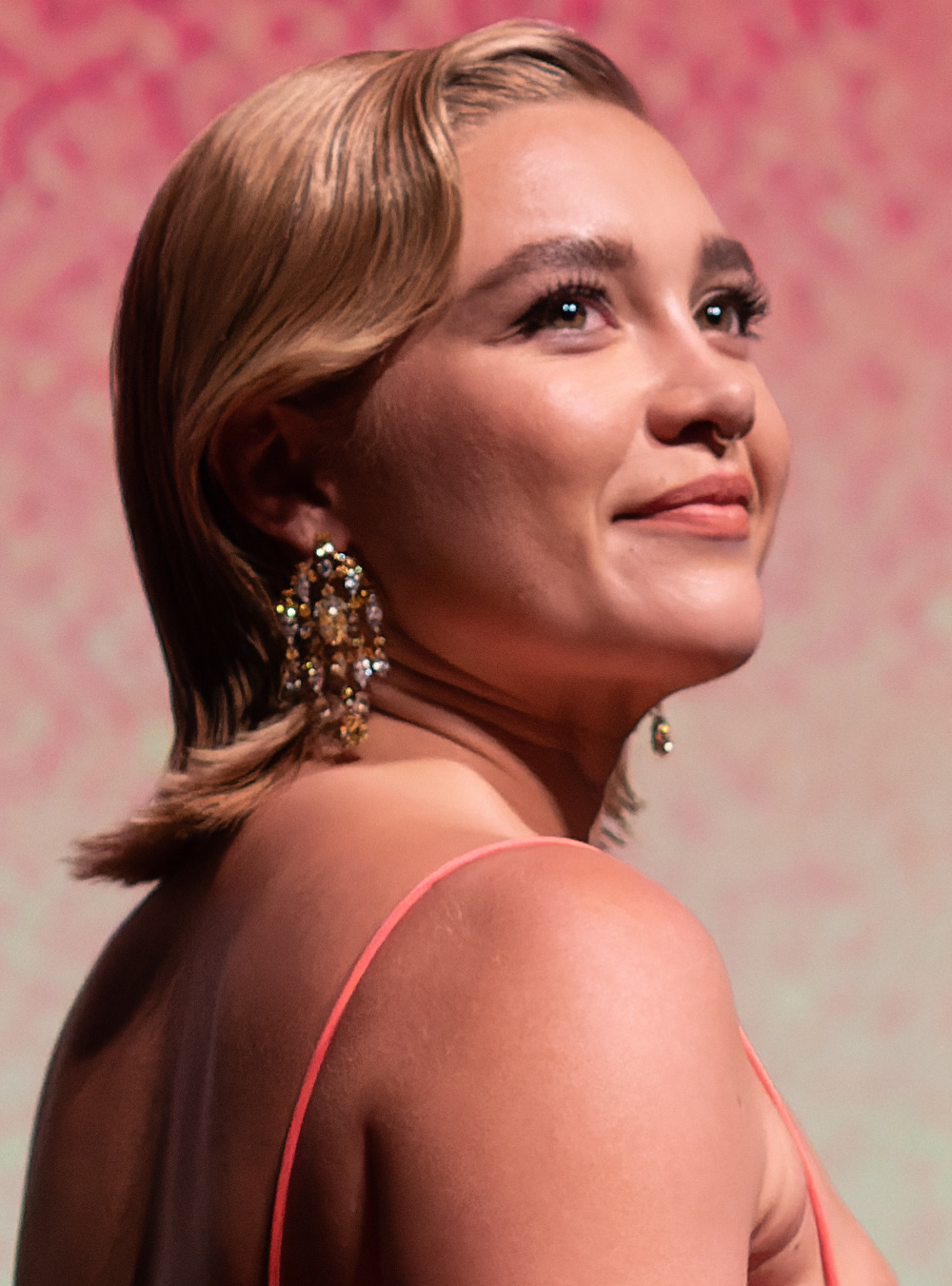
- Pugh at the BFI London Film Festival in 2022
Awards and nominations
Award	Wins	Nominations
Academy Awards	0	1
Critics' Choice Awards	3	5
BAFTA Awards	0	2
Screen Actors Guild Awards	1	1

Totals (Note: Certain award groups do not simply award one winner. They acknowledge several different recipients, have runners-up, and have third place. Since this is a specific recognition and is different from losing an award, runner-up mentions are considered wins in this award tally. For simplification and to avoid errors, each award in this list has been presumed to have had a prior nomination.)
- Wins: 33
- Nominations: 81

Florence Pugh is an English actress. Over her career she has received various accolades including an Actor Award, the Cannes Film Festival's Trophée Chopard, and three Critics' Choice Awards as well as nominations for an Academy Award, and three BAFTA Awards.

She gained recognition for her portrayal of an unhappily married woman in the independent drama film Lady Macbeth (2016). Her performance won her the British Independent Film Award for Best Actress. In 2018 she was nominated for the BAFTA Rising Star Award. The following year she received further critical acclaim – for her performances as Dani Ardor in Ari Aster's horror film Midsommar (2019) for which she was nominated for the Gotham Independent Film Award for Best Actress and Elizabeth de Burgh in the historical action drama Outlaw King (2019) for which she was nominated for the BAFTA Scotland Award for Best Actress. That same year she portrayed Amy March in Greta Gerwig's period film Little Women (both 2019), which earned her nominations for the BAFTA Award and Academy Award for Best Supporting Actress.

She portrayed Jean Tatlock in Christopher Nolan's historical epic Oppenheimer (2023) and won alongside the ensemble the Actor Award for Outstanding Performance by a Cast in a Motion Picture and the Critics' Choice Movie Award for Best Acting Ensemble. Since 2021, Pugh has portrayed Yelena Belova in the Marvel Cinematic Universe (MCU) films. She earned two Critics' Choice Super Awards for Best Actress in a Superhero Movie for her MCU roles in Black Widow (2021) and Thunderbolts* (2025).

== Major associations ==
=== Academy Awards ===
Year	Category	Nominated work	Result	Ref.
2020	Best Supporting Actress	Little Women	Nominated	

=== Actor Awards ===
Year	Category	Nominated work	Result	Ref.
2023	Outstanding Cast in a Motion Picture	Oppenheimer	Won	

=== BAFTA Awards ===
Year	Category	Nominated work	Result	Ref.
British Academy Film Awards
2018	Rising Star Award	—N/a	Nominated	
2020	Best Actress in a Supporting Role	Little Women	Nominated	
BAFTA Scotland Awards
2019	Best Actress in Film	Outlaw King	Nominated	

=== Critics' Choice Awards ===
Year	Category	Nominated work	Result	Ref.
Critics' Choice Movie Awards
2020	Best Supporting Actress	Little Women	Nominated	
2020	Best Acting Ensemble	Little Women	Nominated	
2024	Best Acting Ensemble	Oppenheimer	Won	
Critics' Choice Super Awards
2022	Best Actress in a Superhero Movie	Black Widow	Won	
2025	Best Actress in a Superhero Movie	Thunderbolts*	Won	

== Miscellaneous awards ==
Award	Year	Category	Work	Result	Ref.
AACTA Awards	2020	Best International Supporting Actress	Little Women	Nominated	
British Independent Film Awards	2017	Best Performance by an Actress	Lady Macbeth	Won	
British Independent Film Awards	2022	Best Lead Performance	The Wonder	Nominated	
British Independent Film Awards	2022	Best Ensemble Performance	The Wonder	Nominated	
Dorian Awards	2019	Supporting Film Performance of the Year – Actress	Little Women	Nominated	
Dorian Awards	2019	Rising Star of the Year	—N/a	Won	
Empire Awards	2018	Best Female Newcomer	Lady Macbeth	Nominated	
European Film Awards	2017	Best Actress	Lady Macbeth	Nominated	
Evening Standard British Film Awards	2017	Breakthrough of the Year	Lady Macbeth	Won	
Fangoria Chainsaw Awards	2020	Best Actress	Midsommar	Nominated	
Gold Derby Film Awards	2020	Best Supporting Actress	Little Women	Nominated	
Gold Derby Film Awards	2020	Best Breakthrough Performer	Little Women	Won	
Gotham Awards	2019	Best Actress	Midsommar	Nominated	
Hollywood Critics Association TV Awards	2022	Best Supporting Actress in a Streaming Series, Comedy	Hawkeye	Nominated	
Irish Academy Awards	2023	Best International Actress	The Wonder	Nominated	
Irish Academy Awards	2025	Best International Actress	We Live in Time	Nominated	
National Film Awards	2018	Best Actress	Lady Macbeth	Won	
Nickelodeon Kids' Choice Awards	2025	Favorite Butt-Kicker	Thunderbolts*	Nominated	
NME Awards	2020	Best Film Actor	—N/a	Nominated	
People's Choice Awards	2021	Best Female Movie Star	Black Widow	Nominated	
People's Choice Awards	2021	Best Action Movie Star	Black Widow	Nominated	
People's Choice Awards	2022	Best Drama Movie Star	Don't Worry Darling	Nominated	
Saturn Awards	2026	Best Supporting Actress in a Film	Thunderbolts*	Nominated	

== Critics associations ==
Award	Year	Category	Work	Result	Ref.
Alliance of Women Film Journalists	2017	Best Breakthrough Performance	Lady Macbeth	Nominated	
Alliance of Women Film Journalists	2019	Best Supporting Actress	Little Women	Won	
Alliance of Women Film Journalists	2019	Best Breakthrough Performance	— (Note: For Little Women, Fighting with My Family, and Midsommar)	Won	
Alliance of Women Film Journalists	2019	Bravest Performance	Midsommar	Nominated	
Austin Film Critics Association	2017	Breakthrough Artist Award	Lady Macbeth	Nominated	
Austin Film Critics Association	2019	Best Supporting Actress	Little Women	Nominated	
Austin Film Critics Association	2019	Best Ensemble	Little Women	Nominated	
Austin Film Critics Association	2019	Breakthrough Artist Award	—	Won	
Boston Society of Film Critics	2019	Best Supporting Actress	Little Women	Runner-up	
Boston Society of Film Critics	2019	Best Ensemble Cast	Little Women	Won	
Chicago Film Critics Association	2017	Most Promising Performer	Lady Macbeth	Nominated	
Chicago Film Critics Association	2019	Best Supporting Actress	Little Women	Won	
Chicago Indie Critics	2020	Best Actress	Midsommar	Nominated	
Chicago Indie Critics	2020	Best Supporting Actress	Little Women	Nominated	
Columbus Film Critics Association	2020	Best Actress	Midsommar	Runner-up	
Columbus Film Critics Association	2020	Best Supporting Actress	Little Women	Won	
Columbus Film Critics Association	2020	Breakthrough Film Artist	Little Women	Won	
Dallas–Fort Worth Film Critics Association	2019	Best Supporting Actress	Little Women	3rd place	
Detroit Film Critics Society	2019	Best Supporting Actress	Little Women	Nominated	
Detroit Film Critics Society	2019	Best Breakthrough Performance	—	Won	
Denver Film Critics Society	2020	Best Supporting Actress	Little Women	Won	
DiscussingFilm Critics Awards	2019	Best Film Actress	Midsommar	Runner-up	
DiscussingFilm Critics Awards	2019	Best Supporting Actress	Little Women	Runner-up	
Dublin Film Critics' Circle	2017	Best Actress	Lady Macbeth	3rd place	
Dublin Film Critics' Circle	2019	Best Actress	Midsommar	6th place	
Florida Film Critics Circle	2019	Best Actress	Midsommar	Runner-up	
Florida Film Critics Circle	2019	Best Ensemble	Little Women	Won	
Florida Film Critics Circle	2019	Pauline Kael Breakout Award	—	Won	
Georgia Film Critics Association	2020	Best Supporting Actress	Little Women	Won	
Georgia Film Critics Association	2020	Best Ensemble	Little Women	Won	
Georgia Film Critics Association	2020	Breakthrough Award	—	Won	
Greater Western New York Film Critics Association	2019	Best Supporting Actress	Little Women	Won	
Houston Film Critics Society	2019	Best Supporting Actress	Little Women	Nominated	
Indiana Film Journalists Association	2019	Best Actress	Midsommar	Nominated	
Indiana Film Journalists Association	2019	Best Supporting Actress	Little Women	Nominated	
IndieWire Critics Poll	2019	Best Actress	Midsommar	6th place	
IndieWire Critics Poll	2019	Best Supporting Actress	Little Women	3rd place	
London Film Critics' Circle	2015	Young British / Irish Performer of the Year	The Falling	Nominated	
London Film Critics' Circle	2017	Actress of the Year	Lady Macbeth	Nominated	
London Film Critics' Circle	2017	British/Irish Actress of the Year	Lady Macbeth	Nominated	
London Film Critics' Circle	2019	Actress of the Year	Midsommar	Nominated	
London Film Critics' Circle	2019	Supporting Actress of the Year	Little Women	Nominated	
London Film Critics' Circle	2019	British/Irish Actress of the Year	—	Won	
London Film Critics' Circle	2022	British/Irish Actress of the Year	— (Note: For Don't Worry Darling,The Wonder,Puss in Boots: The Last Wish)	Won	
Music City Film Critics Association	2020	Best Supporting Actress	Little Women	Won	
National Society of Film Critics	2019	Best Actress	Midsommar	3rd place	
National Society of Film Critics	2019	Best Supporting Actress	Little Women	2nd place	
North Carolina Film Critics Association	2020	Best Supporting Actress	Little Women	Won	
North Dakota Film Society	2020	Best Actress	Midsommar	Won	
North Dakota Film Society	2020	Best Supporting Actress	Little Women	Nominated	
Online Association of Female Film Critics	2019	Best Breakthrough Performance	Midsommar	Won	
Online Film Critics Society	2019	Best Actress	Midsommar	Nominated	
Online Film Critics Society	2019	Best Supporting Actress	Little Women	Nominated	
Online Film and Television Association	2020	Best Supporting Actress	Little Women	Runner-up	
Online Film and Television Association	2020	Best Female Breakthrough	Midsommar	Runner-up	
Philadelphia Film Critics Circle	2019	Best Supporting Actress	Little Women	Won	
Philadelphia Film Critics Circle	2019	Best Breakthrough Performance	Little Women	Won	
San Diego Film Critics Society	2019	Best Supporting Actress	Little Women	Nominated	
San Diego Film Critics Society	2019	Best Breakthrough Artist	— (Note: For Midsommar and Little Women)	Won	
Seattle Film Critics Society	2019	Best Supporting Actress	Little Women	Nominated	
Seattle Film Critics Society	2019	Best Ensemble Cast	Little Women	Nominated	
Southeastern Film Critics Association	2019	Best Supporting Actress	Little Women	Runner-up	
St. Louis Film Critics Association	2019	Best Supporting Actress	Little Women	Nominated	
Toronto Film Critics Association	2019	Best Supporting Actress	Little Women	Runner-up	
Utah Film Critics Association	2019	Best Supporting Actress	Little Women	Won	
Vancouver Film Critics Circle	2019	Best Supporting Actress	Little Women	Nominated	
Washington D.C. Area Film Critics Association	2019	Best Supporting Actress	Little Women	Nominated	
Washington D.C. Area Film Critics Association	2019	Best Ensemble	Little Women	Nominated	
Women Film Critics Circle	2019	Best Actress	Midsommar	Nominated	

== Film Festivals ==
Award	Year	Category	Work	Result	Ref.
BFI London Film Festival	2014	Best British Newcomer	The Falling	Nominated	
Cannes Film Festival	2019	Chopard Trophy	—N/a	Won	
Capri Hollywood International Film Festival	2023	Best Ensemble Cast	Oppenheimer	Won	
Dublin International Film Festival	2017	Best Actress	Lady Macbeth	Won	
Festival 2 Cinéma 2 Valenciennes	2017	Best Actress	Lady Macbeth	Won	
Montclair Film Festival	2017	Special Jury Prize	Lady Macbeth	Won	
Santa Barbara International Film Festival	2020	Virtuoso Award	—	Won	
