= Gemma Arterton =

English actress (born 1986)

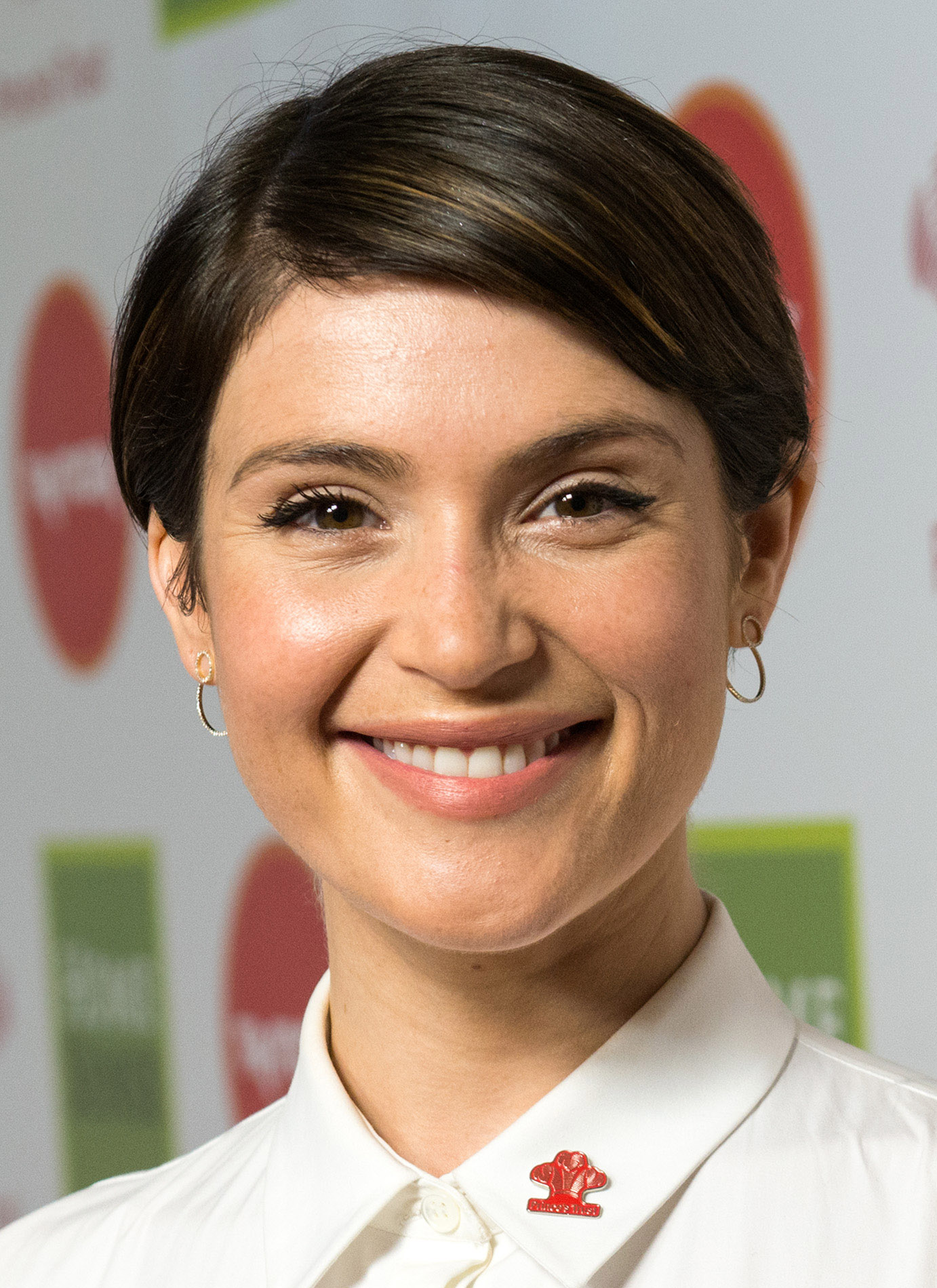
- Arterton in 2017
- Born: Gemma Christina Arterton; 2 February 1986 (age 40); Gravesend, Kent, England
- Education: Royal Academy of Dramatic Art (RADA)
- Occupations: Actress; producer
- Years active: 2003–present
- Spouses: Stefano Catelli (m. 2010; div. 2015) Rory Keenan (m. 2019)
- Children: 2
- Relatives: Hannah Arterton (sister); Wreckless Eric (cousin)

Gemma Christina Arterton (born 2 February 1986) is an English actress. After her stage debut in Shakespeare's Love's Labour's Lost at the Globe Theatre (2007), Arterton made her feature-film debut in the comedy St Trinian's (2007). She portrayed Bond Girl Strawberry Fields in the James Bond film Quantum of Solace (2008), a performance which won her an Empire Award for Best Newcomer, and spy Pollyana "Polly" Wilkins / Agent Galahad in the action war film The King's Man (2021).

Arterton has appeared in a number of other films, including The Disappearance of Alice Creed (2009), Tamara Drewe (2010), Clash of the Titans (2010), Prince of Persia: The Sands of Time (2010), Hansel & Gretel: Witch Hunters (2013), Their Finest (2016), The Escape (2017), Vita and Virginia (2018), and Culprits (2023). She received the Harper's Bazaar Woman of the Year Award for acting in and producing The Escape. Her theatrical highlights have included starring in The Duchess of Malfi (2014), Made in Dagenham (2014), Nell Gwynn (2016), and Saint Joan (2017). Arterton was nominated for Olivier Awards for her work on both Nell Gwynn and Made in Dagenham, and she won the Evening Standard Theatre Award for the latter.

Since 2016, Arterton has run her own production company, Rebel Park Productions, which focuses on creating female-led content in front of and behind the camera.

== Early life and education ==
Gemma Christina Arterton was born on 2 February 1986 at North Kent Hospital in Gravesend with polydactyly, a condition resulting in extra fingers which were removed shortly after her birth. Her mother, Sally-Anne Heap, runs a cleaning business, and her father, Barry J. Arterton, is a welder. They divorced while Arterton was a young child, and she grew up on a council estate with her mother and younger sister, Hannah Arterton, who is also an actress. Her matrilineal great-grandmother was a German-Jewish concert violinist.

Arterton attended Gravesend Grammar School for Girls, in Kent (now Mayfield Grammar School) and made her amateur stage debut in a production of Alan Ayckbourn's The Boy Who Fell into a Book. Her performance won her the best-actress prize in a competition at a local festival.

At age 16, Arterton left Gravesend Grammar School to study Drama at the Miskin Theatre at North Kent College, Dartford. She later studied at the Royal Academy of Dramatic Art, graduating in 2008.

== Career ==
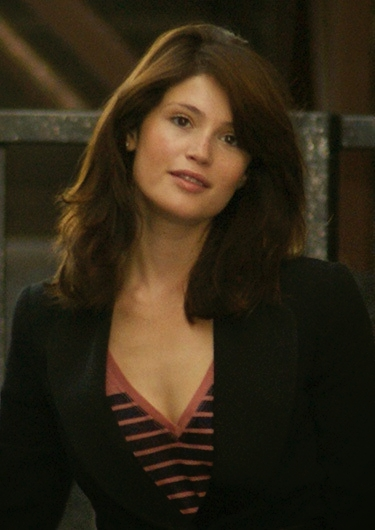
Arterton in 2010

Arterton had her first professional role in Stephen Poliakoff's Capturing Mary while she was still at drama school. She made her stage debut as Rosaline in Shakespeare's Love's Labour's Lost at the Globe Theatre in London in July 2007, before graduating later that year. She made her film debut in St Trinian's (2007) as Head Girl Kelly.

In 2008, she worked alongside Daniel Craig in the James Bond film Quantum of Solace. Chosen from around fifteen hundred candidates, Arterton plays Bond Girl Strawberry Fields, in what is described as a "nice-sized role". Arterton describes her character as "the thinking man's crumpet". In the same year, she played the eponymous protagonist in the BBC adaptation of Thomas Hardy's Tess of the d'Urbervilles. Also in 2008, she played Elizabeth Bennet in the ITV serial, Lost in Austen.

Her most controversial role to date was in the 2009 film The Disappearance of Alice Creed, in which her character is kidnapped and abused in several graphic nude scenes. The role required her to be handcuffed to a bed and wear a ball gag in her mouth throughout. She requested that she be left tied to the bed even when the camera was not on her to help her performance. She joked that the crew would put the ball gag back in if she was chatting too much. The film was well received, with Frank Scheck for The Hollywood Reporter noting, "Arterton… handles the rigorous physical and emotional demands of her role with great skill".

Arterton was the face of Avon's Bond Girl 007 fragrance, when it was launched in October 2008. In 2010, Arterton made her West End debut in the UK premiere of The Little Dog Laughed. She was originally attached to star in a new adaptation of Wuthering Heights as Catherine Earnshaw; however, she later left the project.

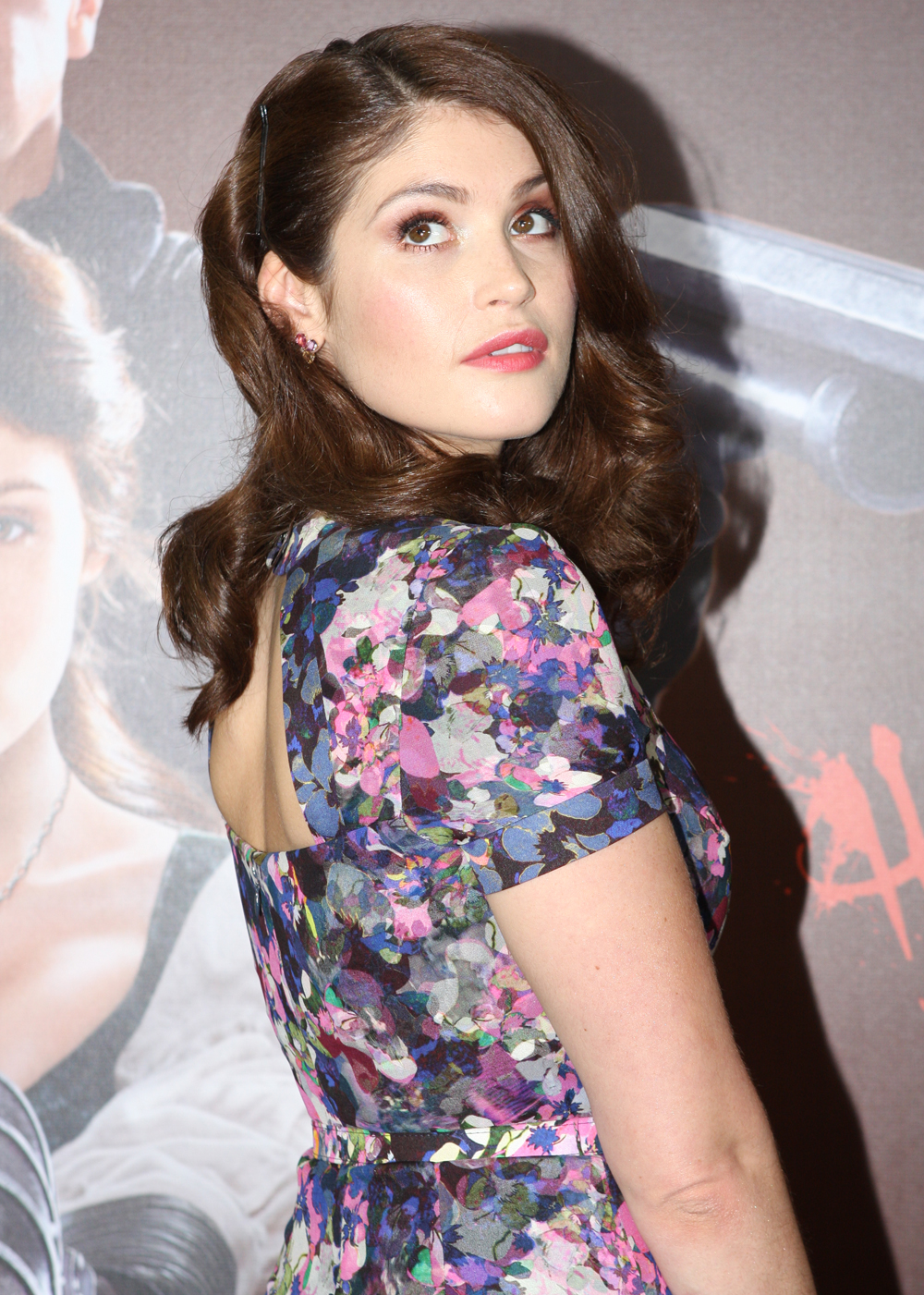
Arterton at the Australian premiere for Hansel & Gretel: Witch Hunters in 2013

Arterton appeared in pivotal roles in the 2010 films Clash of the Titans, Prince of Persia: The Sands of Time, and played the lead in Tamara Drewe. In 2010, Arterton also starred in the Almeida Theatre's production of The Master Builder directed by Travis Preston, where she was widely praised for her performance as Hilde Wangel. In 2011, Arterton was nominated for the British Academy of Film and Television Arts Rising Star Award and was under consideration for Leading Actress for her performances in Tamara Drewe and The Disappearance of Alice Creed.

Arterton starred in the action horror film Hansel and Gretel: Witch Hunters as Gretel, opposite Jeremy Renner, who played Hansel. The 3-D film was set 15 years after Hansel and Gretel killed the witch who kidnapped them. It was released on 25 January 2013. In January 2014, she took the title role in John Webster's The Duchess of Malfi, the inaugural production at the Sam Wanamaker Playhouse, the new indoor theatre at Shakespeare's Globe. Both the play and Arterton herself received positive reviews, with Paul Taylor for The Independent reporting. "The luminous Gemma Arterton beautifully captures the multi-faceted quality of the Duchess". In the same year, she starred with Ryan Reynolds, Anna Kendrick and Jacki Weaver in the psychological thriller film, The Voices.

In 2015, Arterton starred as the titular lead in Gemma Bovery. The film is a re-imagining of Gustave Flaubert's 19th century classic Madame Bovary directed by Anne Fontaine. Arterton learnt to speak French for the role, never having spoken the language previously.

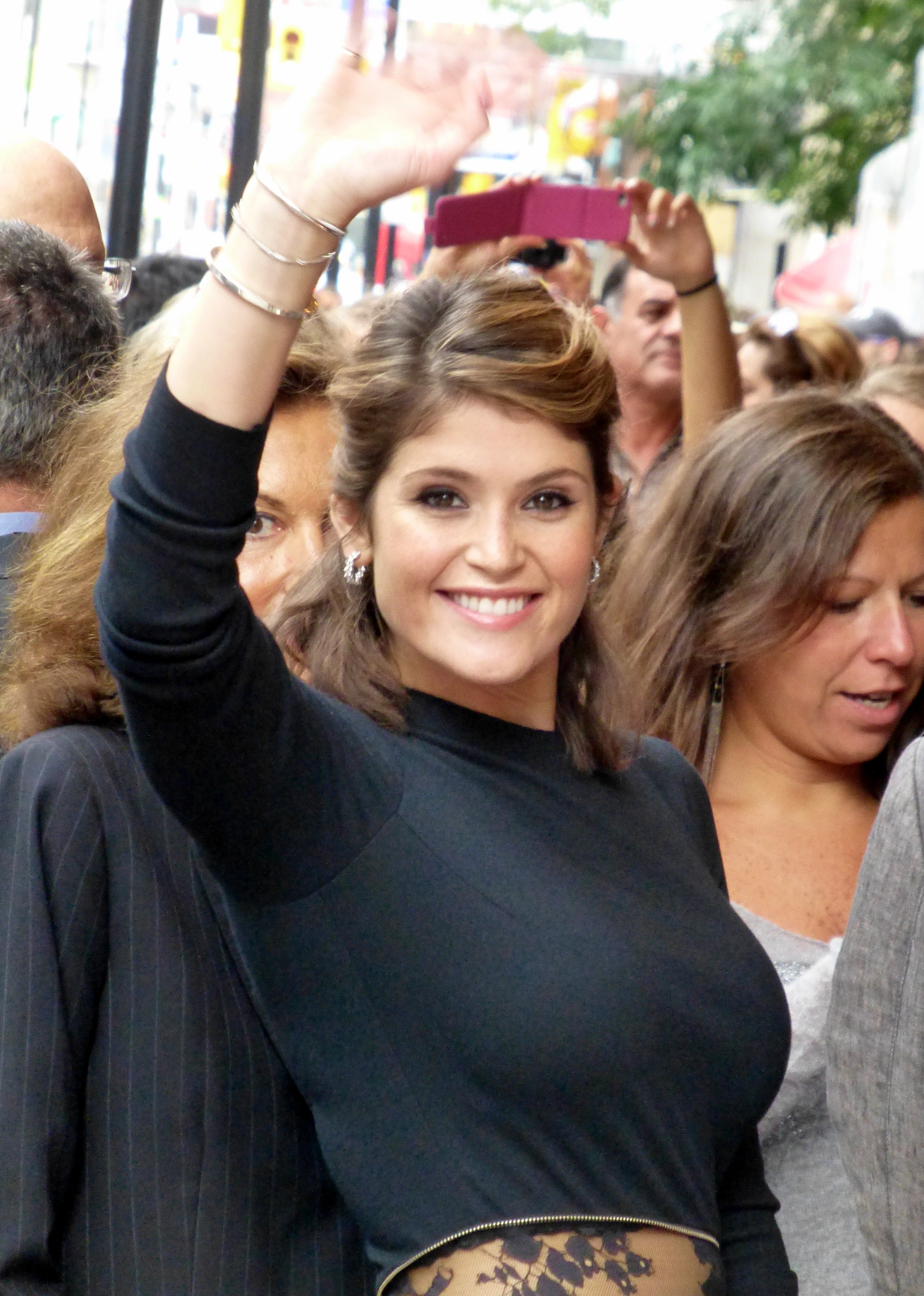
Arterton at the 2014 Toronto International Film Festival

In 2014–2015, Arterton starred in Made in Dagenham, a stage musical about the Ford sewing machinists strike of 1968 concerning equal pay for women. Since its premiere on 5 November 2014 at the Adelphi Theatre in London, she has publicly expressed her support for their cause. She played a fictional character named Rita O'Grady and her performance received mixed reviews from critics. Simon Edge, for the Daily Express, complained of an "underpowered central performance from Gemma Arterton as Rita". However, Matt Trueman for Variety praised Arterton for her "all-out star turn" and Paul Taylor, for The Independent, praised how "Arterton holds the show together beautifully". Despite the show closing after only five months, Arterton was nevertheless nominated for an Olivier Award for best actress in a musical, and went on to win the Evening Standard award for Newcomer in a Musical.

In a 2015 interview with the Independent newspaper, Arterton stated that she was the director Jonathan Glazer's choice for the lead role in his movie Under the Skin. Glazer, however, was forced to recast because Arterton was not famous enough for the film to secure financing.

In February 2016, Arterton started a run playing the title role in the Shakespeare's Globe transfer of Nell Gwynn, at the West End's Apollo Theatre. Arterton was praised by critics, with Michael Billington for The Guardian citing her "natural sparkle". For her performance, she was nominated for an Olivier Award for Best Actress in a Play. In July 2016, she was named as a member of the main competition jury for the 73rd Venice International Film Festival. Also in this year, Arterton was nominated for a BIFA for Best Supporting Actress for her role as the teacher Helen Justineau in The Girl with All the Gifts. Her performance, a story set in a dystopian future world ravaged by a zombie pathogen, was generally well reviewed.

In 2016, Arterton set up Rebel Park Productions to create female-lead and female-centric film and TV projects. She produced the well-received short film Leading Lady Parts in support of Time's Up. The film starred Emilia Clarke, Tom Hiddleston and Gemma Chan and helped to raise awareness for the UK Justice and Equality Fund. In the same year, she played one of four lead roles in Arnaud des Pallières' French language film Orpheline (Orphan), a role in which she exercised the French language skills she had acquired for her role in Gemma Bovery.

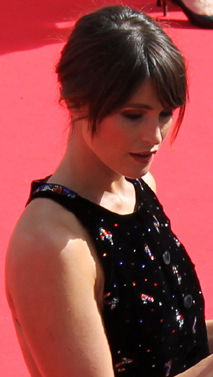
Arterton at the 2016 Toronto International Film Festival, for the premiere of Their Finest

In 2017, Arterton took on the role of Joan in Josie Rourke's interpretation of George Bernard Shaw's classic story Saint Joan. While the play itself received mixed reviews, Arterton's performance was widely praised as the highlight of the show. In the same year, she appeared as the fictional young screenwriter Catrin Cole in Their Finest, a wartime romcom about a propaganda film crew working during the Second World War. Arterton's performance amongst the impressive ensemble of supporting actors (Bill Nighy, Sam Claflin, and Eddie Marsan) was generally well received.

In 2018, Arterton produced and co-created The Escape, a largely improvised film about a mother struggling with the breakdown of her marriage. The film received excellent reviews, and Arterton was nominated for a BIFA for Best Actress in a British Independent Film. She was awarded Woman of the Year by Harper's Bazaar for her work on the film. Also in 2018, Arterton was one of 928 new members invited to join the Academy of Motion Picture Arts and Sciences, 49% of whom were female as part of the academy's ongoing attempt to increase representation.

In 2018, Arterton was announced as playing late singer Dusty Springfield in a film about her life.

In 2019, Arterton appeared in the Netflix comedy Murder Mystery (which stars Adam Sandler, Jennifer Aniston, and Luke Evans). Despite the film's largely negative reviews, it was watched by 30.9 million Netflix account holders in its first three days of release, then a record for the streaming service. In the same year, Arterton played socialite and author Vita Sackville-West in Vita and Virginia, a film about the romantic relationship between Arterton's character and Virginia Woolf, which was the inspiration for Woolf's novel Orlando: A Biography. Arterton is credited as executive producer of the film. She also produced and starred in the short film Hayley Alien, which was written and directed by her sister and co-star, Hannah Arterton.

Arterton was an executive producer and starred in the Second World War film Summerland, directed by Jessica Swale. Arterton had previously worked with Swale on the stage show Nell Gwynn. In 2021, Arterton appeared in the First World War film The King's Man as secret agent Pollyana "Polly" Wilkins / Agent Galahad of Kingsman, a role she will reprise in the sequel The Traitor King.

In 2024, she joined Carl Tibbetts's Sweet Dreams.

== Other activities ==
Arterton is on record as being a supporter of the Time's Up, ERA 50:50, and MeToo movements. She played an integral role in persuading actresses to wear black at the 2018 BAFTAs in support of Time'sUp, and has been involved with ERA 50:50, an equal-pay campaign in the UK, since its inception.

== Personal life ==
Arterton met production assistant John Nolan on the set of Quantum of Solace and they lived together in London. In 2008, she had a relationship with Spanish stuntman Eduardo Muñoz, whom she met on the set of Prince of Persia: The Sands of Time. They lived together in a London flat for six months before the relationship ended.

Arterton married Stefano Catelli in 2010. They separated in 2013, and, in August 2015, their divorce was finalised "by consent" at the Central Family Court in High Holborn. Arterton said she "never really believed in exchanging vows" and that she was not sure she would "want to walk down the aisle again". In 2013, Arterton stated that she wanted to wait until she has accomplished something in the acting world before having children.

In 2019, Arterton married actor Rory Keenan. They have two children.

== Filmography ==
Key
†	Denotes projects that have not yet been released

=== Film ===
Year	Title	Role	Notes	Ref.
2007	Capturing Mary	Liza	Television film	
2007	St Trinian's	Kelly Jones		
2008	Three and Out	Frankie Cassidy		
2008	RocknRolla	June		
2008	Quantum of Solace	Strawberry Fields		
2009	The Boat That Rocked	Desiree		
2009	The Disappearance of Alice Creed	Alice Creed		
2009	St Trinian's 2: The Legend of Fritton's Gold	Kelly Jones		
2009	Perfect	Poppy	Short film	
2010	Clash of the Titans	Io		
2010	Prince of Persia: The Sands of Time	Princess Tamina of Alamut		
2010	Tamara Drewe	Tamara Drewe		
2010	A Turtle's Tale: Sammy's Adventures	Shelly	Voice role, UK Version	
2011	Astonish Me	The Guide	Short film	
2012	It's Getting Late	Sarah	Short film	
2012	Byzantium	Clara Webb		
2012	Song for Marion	Elizabeth		
2013	Hansel & Gretel: Witch Hunters	Gretel		
2013	Runner Runner	Rebecca Shafran		
2014	The Voices	Fiona		
2014	Gemma Bovery	Gemma Bovery		
2016	The Complete Walk: Love's Labour's Lost	Lady Rosaline	Short film	
2016	100 Streets	Emily		
2016	The Girl with All the Gifts	Helen Justineau		
2016	The History of Love	Alma Mereminski		
2016	Orphan	Tara		
2016	Their Finest	Catrin Cole		
2017	The Escape	Tara		
2018	Vita & Virginia	Vita Sackville-West		
2018	It's Me, Sugar	Marilyn Monroe	Short film	
2019	Murder Mystery	Grace Ballard		
2019	My Zoe	Laura Fischer		
2019	How to Build a Girl	Maria von Trapp		
2019	Master Moley	Mona Lisa	Short film, voice role	
2019	StarDog and TurboCat	Cassidy	Voice role	
2020	Summerland	Alice Lamb		
2020	Hayley Alien	Woman on the Bridge	Short film	
2021	Bump	Pearl	Short film	
2021	The King's Man	Polly Wilkins		
2022	Rogue Agent	Alice Archer		
2022	The Cunning	Elizabeth	Short film	
2022	The Amazing Maurice	Peaches	Voice role	
2023	The Critic	Nina Land		
2024	Buffalo Kids	Governess Eleanor	Voice role, English Version	
2025	Grand Prix of Europe	Edda	Voice role, English Version	
2027	The Amazing Maurice - The Waters of Life †	Peaches	In production	
TBA	Watch the Skies †	TBA	Post-production	
TBA	Killa Bee †	Bryony 'Killa Bee' Tyrell	Pre-production	

=== Television ===
Year	Title	Role	Notes	Ref.
2008	Lost in Austen	Elizabeth Bennet	Miniseries; 2 episodes	
2008	Tess of the D'Urbervilles	Tess Durbeyfield	Miniseries; 4 episodes	
2014	Inside No. 9	Gerri	Episode: "Tom & Gerri"	
2016	Some Mothers Do 'Ave 'Em	Jessica Spencer	Episode: "Sport Relief Special"	
2018	Urban Myths	Marilyn Monroe	Episode: "Marilyn Monroe and Billy Wilder"	
2018	Leading Lady Parts	Panelist 2	Television short	
2018	Watership Down	Clover	Miniseries; 4 episodes	
2020	Unprecedented	Ellie	Episode: "Safer at Home"	
2020	Black Narcissus	Sister Clodagh	Miniseries; 3 episodes	
2021–2023	Moley	Mona Lisa	Voice role; Series regular; 18 episodes	
2022–2024	Funny Woman	Barbara Parker / Sophie Straw	Lead Role; 10 episodes; also executive producer	
2023	Culprits	Dianne	Series regular; 7 episodes	
2026	Secret Service	Kate Henderson	Series regular; 5 episodes	
TBA	The Portrait of a Lady †	Madame Merle	Upcoming six-part series	

=== Music videos ===
- "Kerala" (2016) by Bonobo
- "Remember Where You Are" (2021) by Jessie Ware

== Theatre credits ==
Year	Title	Role	Venue	Ref.
2007	Love's Labour's Lost	Lady Rosaline	Shakespeare's Globe, London	
2010	The Little Dog Laughed	Ellen	Garrick Theatre, London	
2010	The Master Builder	Hilde Wangel	Almeida Theatre, London	
2014	The Duchess of Malfi	The Duchess	Sam Wanamaker Playhouse, London	
2014–2015	Made in Dagenham	Rita O'Grady	Adelphi Theatre, London	
2016	Nell Gwynn	Nell Gwynn	Apollo Theatre, London	
2016–2017	Saint Joan	Joan of Arc	Donmar Warehouse, London	
2021	Walden	Stella	Harold Pinter Theatre, London	

== Accolades ==
Year	Award	Category	Nominated work	Result	Ref
2008	Empire Award	Best Newcomer	St Trinian's	Nominated	
2008	National Movie Award	Best Actress	St Trinian's	Nominated	
2009	Empire Award	Best Newcomer	Quantum of Solace	Won	
2009	Broadcasting Press Guild Awards	Best Actress	Tess of the D'Urbervilles	Nominated	
2010	Teen Choice Award	Choice Movie: Female Breakout	Clash of the Titans	Nominated	
2010	Teen Choice Award	Choice Fantasy Actress	Prince of Persia: The Sands of Time and Clash of the Titans	Nominated	
2010	Scream Award	Best Breakout Performance Female	Prince of Persia: The Sands of Time	Nominated	
2011	BAFTA	Rising Star Award	Herself	Nominated	
2011	Glamour Awards	Woman of the Year – Film Actress	Herself	Won	
2014	The WIFTS Foundation International Visionary Awards	The Barbara Tipple Award for Best Actress	Gemma Bovery	Won	
2015	Whatsonstage.com Awards	Best Actress in a Musical	Made in Dagenham	Nominated	
2015	Laurence Olivier Award	Best Actress in a Musical	Made in Dagenham	Nominated	
2015	Evening Standard Theatre Award	Newcomer in a Musical	Made in Dagenham	Won	
2016	Laurence Olivier Award	Best Actress	Nell Gwynn	Nominated	
2016	Evening Standard Theatre Award	Best Actress	Nell Gwynn	Nominated	
2016	British Independent Film Awards	Best Supporting Actress	The Girl With All The Gifts	Nominated	
2016	Glamour Awards	Best Theatre Actress	Herself	Won	
2017	National Film Awards UK	Best Actress	The Girl With All The Gifts	Nominated	
2018	British Independent Film Awards	Best Actress	The Escape	Nominated	
2018	National Film Awards UK	Best Actress	Their Finest	Nominated	
2018	Harper's Bazaar	Woman of the Year	Herself	Won	
2019	National Film Awards UK	Best Actress	The Escape	Nominated	
