= Regina Aquino =

Filipino American actress

Regina Aquino is an actress from Washington, D.C.

Aquino is the first Filipino American actress to receive a Helen Hayes Award (2019). Aquino was nominated and received the award for Outstanding Lead Actress in a Play for her work in the play The Events. In her acceptance speech, Aquino highlighted the significance of winning during Asian American and Pacific Islander Heritage Month and expressed pride in being from the District of Columbia. That same year, Washingtonian Magazine included her in a list of D.C.'s 10 biggest theater stars.

Aquino began performing at a young age, appearing in her first play in second grade. She graduated from Duke Ellington School of the Arts, where she studied theatre. In addition to acting, Aquino has worked as producer, writer, and director of the documentary film Faith Healers.

Throughout her career, she has been a vocal advocate for diversity and representation in theater, challenging stereotypes and emphasizing the importance of authentic storytelling.

== Credits ==
=== Theatre ===
Year	Title	Role	Playwright(s)	Company	Venue
2003	Polaroid Stories	Eurydice	Naomi Iizuka	Studio Theatre	Studio Theatre
2006	Dog Sees God: Confessions of a Teenage Blockhead	Lucy	Bert V. Royal	Studio Theatre	Studio Theatre
2006	Red Light Winter	Christina	Adam Rapp	Studio Theatre	Studio Theatre
2007	A Christmas Carol	Christmas Past	N/A	Synetic Theater	Rosslyn Spectrum
2016	Where Words Once Were	Alli/Eila	Finegan Kruckemeyer	Lincoln Center & Kennedy Center TYA	The Kennedy Center
2016	Brownsville Song (B-side for Trey)	Merrell	Kimber Lee	Theater Alliance	The Westerly
2017	The Arsonists	Anna	Max Frisch	Woolly Mammoth Theatre Company	Woolly Mammoth Theatre Company
2018	Vietgone	Tong	Qui Nguyen	Studio Theatre	Studio Theatre
2018	The Events	Claire	David Greig	Theater Alliance	The Anacostia Playhouse
2019	Nell Gwynn	Lady Castlemaine & Louise de Keroualle	Jessica Swale	Folger Theatre	Folger Theatre
2019	Describe the Night	Yevgenia	Rajiv Joseph	Woolly Mammoth Theatre Company	Woolly Mammoth Theater Company
2019	Tiger Style!	Jennifer	Mike Lew	Olney Theatre Center	Olney Theatre Center
2019	Eureka Day	Meiko	Jonathan Spector	Mosaic Theater Company	Atlas Performing Arts Center
2020	The Merry Wives of Windsor	Mistress Page	William Shakespeare	Folger Theatre	Folger Theatre
2021	We're Gonna Die	Singer	Young Jean Lee	Round House Theatre	Round House Theatre
2021	Birds of North America	Caitlyn	Anna Ouyang Moench	Mosaic Theater Company	Atlas Performing Arts Center
2022	Holiday	Susan Potter	Philip Barry	Arena Stage	Fichandler Stage, Arena Stage
2023	The Mortification of Fovea Munson	Mom/Grandma Van	Mary Winn Heider	The Kennedy Center	Family Theater, The Kennedy Center
2023	Our Verse in Time to Come	Joan Chen	Devin E. Haqq, Karen Ann Daniels, Malik Work	Folger Theatre	Folger Theatre
2024	Nancy	Joan/Ensemble	Rhiana Yazzie	Mosaic Theater Company	Atlas Performing Arts Center

=== Film ===
Year	Title	Role	Notes
2025	Faith Healers	Producer, Writer, Director	Documentary

== Awards & Nominations ==
=== Helen Hayes Awards ===
Year	Category	Work	Result
2007	Outstanding Ensemble, Resident Production	Dog Sees God	Nomination
2018	Outstanding Lead Actress	The Events	Won
2020	Outstanding Ensemble in a Play	Nell Gwynn	Nomination
2020	Outstanding Production in a Play	Nell Gwynn	Nomination
