= Slumber (film) =

2017 British film by Jonathan Hopkins

- Theatrical release poster
- Directed by: Jonathan Hopkins
- Written by: Richard Hobley; Jonathan Hopkins
- Produced by: Mark Lane; James Harris; Pascal Degove
- Starring: Maggie Q; Kristen Bush; Sam Troughton; Will Kemp; William Hope; Sylvester McCoy
- Cinematography: Polly Morgan
- Edited by: Gary Forrestor
- Music by: Ulas Pakkan
- Production companies: Goldcrest Films; Hotwells Productions; Tea Shop Productions
- Distributed by: Miracle Communications; Signature Entertainment
- Release date: 1 December 2017 (U.S.)
- Running time: 85 minutes
- Country: United Kingdom
- Language: English

Slumber is a 2017 British supernatural horror-thriller film directed by Jonathan Hopkins and co-written by Richard Hobley and Hopkins. It stars Maggie Q, Kristen Bush, Sam Troughton, Will Kemp, William Hope and Sylvester McCoy.

It was released on 1 December 2017, by Vertical Entertainment.

== Plot ==
Dr. Alice Arnolds is a respected sleep therapist and neurologist, but beneath her composed exterior, she carries the trauma of a horrifying childhood event, her younger brother died mysteriously while sleepwalking. She found him dead at the base of the stairs, his eyes wide open in terror. Though it was ruled an accident, Alice has never truly accepted that explanation.

Now an adult, Alice works at the Whittingham Sleep Clinic, where she conducts overnight studies on patients suffering from parasomnias. She is logical, clinical, and deeply skeptical of anything not grounded in science.

Alice is introduced to the Morgan family, father Charlie, mother Sarah, daughter Emily, and young son Daniel. Daniel has been suffering from intense sleep disturbances, he wakes up screaming, thrashing, and insisting that something is in his room at night. He describes it as a black, shadowy figure with glowing eyes that sits on his chest and tries to suck the life out of him.

The family is brought into the clinic for an overnight observation. During the sleep study, Alice monitors Daniel’s vitals and brainwave patterns. But as the night deepens, Charlie suddenly experiences a violent episode. In a disturbing scene, he enters a deep sleep, his breathing rapid, and begins convulsing. Then, without warning, he springs up and attacks Alice, his eyes still shut, as if possessed.

It takes multiple staff members to subdue Charlie, and when he is restrained and sedated, his EEG reads flat as if he weren't even present in his own body. Alice suspects night terrors or sleepwalking, but her explanations start to unravel as more bizarre and chilling events unfold.

Over the next 24 hours, Daniel’s condition deteriorates. He becomes increasingly pale, develops deep purple bruises around his chest and neck despite no signs of injury, and speaks of the “dark thing” that now comes to him in the day as well. Emily begins seeing it too, a tall, skeletal figure with hollow eye sockets, appearing in the corners of rooms, vanishing when approached.

Sarah confesses to Alice that Charlie has become withdrawn and erratic at night, mumbling in his sleep and waking up in different parts of the house, often with bloody fingernails as if he's been clawing at something or someone.

Alice begins to experience vivid hallucinations or waking dreams herself. In one disturbing sequence, she lies down to rest and awakens to find herself paralyzed, unable to move as a monstrous figure climbs onto her chest. The creature’s face is contorted, its mouth filled with jagged, rotting teeth, and it hisses words in an unknown language. When she finally snaps out of it, she finds scratch marks on her body.

Desperate for answers, Alice consults Cam, the clinic’s janitor, who suggests she speak with his uncle Amado, a former sleep expert who now lives off the grid after a mental breakdown. Amado tells her about an ancient sleep demon called the Nocnitsa, also known as the Night Hag. It is a parasitic entity that feeds on human fear, entering the subconscious during REM sleep and causing hallucinations, paralysis, and even death. It especially targets the vulnerable children and those with emotional trauma.

According to folklore, once the Nocnitsa enters a person’s dreams, it gradually drains their life essence, leaving them a shell. It doesn't just kill, it possesses the bodies of its victims, turning them into carriers who infect others through shared trauma and contact during sleep.

Determined to stop the demon, Alice returns to the clinic and convinces Sarah to help induce deep REM sleep in Daniel while she enters a lucid dream state using a controversial experimental technique. Alice essentially “joins” Daniel in his dream to confront the entity directly.

Inside the shared dream, Alice finds herself in a decaying replica of the Morgan house. Daniel is trapped in a nightmarish version of his room, walls covered in rot, toys mangled and twitching unnaturally. The Nocnitsa appears, a towering, eyeless shadow with limbs that stretch like tendrils, its voice a mixture of Daniel’s and her dead brother’s.

Alice fights the creature, suffering hallucinations of her brother’s death over and over. The entity whispers that she let him die, and tries to consume her as she's pulled into the abyss. In a final act of resistance, Alice accepts the truth, her brother’s death was not her fault, but caused by the Nocnitsa, who had latched onto her since childhood.

With this emotional breakthrough, she finds the strength to confront the demon, injecting Daniel with a stimulant in the real world at the right moment. The dream breaks violently, windows shatter, monitors explode, and Alice is thrown across the room.

Daniel awakens, gasping for air. The bruises fade. The family is safe for now. But in the final scene, Alice is exhausted and alone in her apartment begins to doze off. Just as her eyes close, the screen blurs, and the unmistakable growl of the Nocnitsa echoes. Her body begins to freeze. Her eyes snap open.

== Production ==
Slumber was filmed at Home Farm in Kent and doubled as the Morgan family home. Production used exterior and interior shots at the location.

Additional external shots from Yorktown Heights, and Pound Ridge, New York.

== Cast ==
- Maggie Q as Alice Arnolds
- Kristen Bush as Sarah Morgan
- Sam Troughton as Charlie Morgan
- Lucas Bond as Daniel Morgan
- Honor Kneafsey as Emily Morgan
- Will Kemp as Tom Arnolds
- William Hope as Malcom
- Sylvester McCoy as Amado
- Sophia Wiseman as Niamh (daughter of Alice)
- Neil Linpow as Dave Marklund
- William Rhead as Liam

== Release ==
In May 2017, Vertical Entertainment acquired distribution rights to the film.

== Reception ==
On review aggregator website Rotten Tomatoes, the film holds an approval rating of 0% based on 8 reviews, with an average rating of 3.25/10.
