= Nocnitsa =

Nightmare folklore spirit

In Slavic mythology, notsnitsa (Belarusian: начніца, romanized: načnica, Polish: nocnica, płaczka, Bulgarian: горска майка, ношно, romanized: gorska majka, nošno, Serbian: шумска маjка, бабице, ноћнице, romanized: šumska majka, babice, noćnice, Croatian: mrake, vidine, Slovene: nočnine, mračnine, Ukrainian: нічниця, romanized: nichnytsia, Russian: ночница, romanized: nochnitsa), often referred in plural, is a nightmare spirit or demon that torments people and especially children at night. Other names for notsnitsa in East Slavic languages include kriksy, plaksy, plachky, plaksivicy, kriksy-varaksy, kriksy-plaksy, night hag, night maiden.

== Folklore ==
In Russian and Slovak folklore, notsnitsa are known to torment children at night, and a stone with a hole in the center is said to be a protection from nocnitsa. Mothers in some regions will place a knife in their children's cradles or draw a circle around the cradles with a knife for protection. This is possibly based on the belief that supernatural beings cannot touch iron.

Nocnitsa is known to sit on one's chest, drawing "life energy". Because of this, many refer to nocnitsa as a type of vampire. Nocnitsa will often continue visiting. According to some folklore, night hags visit when one sleeps on one's back, with the hands on the chest (a position allegedly called "sleeping with the dead"). According to some folklore, night hags are made of shadow. She might also have a horrible screeching voice. She might allegedly also smell of the moss and dirt from her forest of origin.

Nocnitsa is linked to the common apparition seen during the hypnagogic state of sleep.

== In popular culture ==
- A creature, considered by the characters to be a nocnitsa, is depicted in a 2017 horror movie Slumber.
- There is a nocnitsa in the supernatural novel Night Terror by John Passarella.
- In the book Coraline, by Neil Gaiman, a Nocnitsa poses as Coraline's alternate dimension mother. Coraline, however, has a stone with a hole in it which protects her.
- It is often believed throughout the Middle East that this mythological creature came into people's homes at night, and would watch their children sleep if they did not behave.
- In the Iron Druid Chronicles book Staked Protagonist, Granuaile MacTiernan alongside Slavic Thunder God Perun and the Orisha Shango are attacked by a group of Nocnitsa.

== See also ==
- Lilin
- Muma Pădurii
- Night hag
- Nochnitsa, a genus named after the mythological creature
