= The Escape (2017 film) =

2017 film

- Film poster
- Directed by: Dominic Savage
- Written by: Dominic Savage
- Produced by: Guy Heeley
- Starring: Gemma Arterton; Dominic Cooper
- Music by: Alexandra Harwood; Anthony John
- Distributed by: Vertigo Films
- Release dates: 12 September 2017 (TIFF); 3 August 2018 (UK)
- Running time: 105 minutes
- Country: United Kingdom
- Language: English
- Box office: $511,203

The Escape is a 2017 British drama film directed by Dominic Savage. It was screened in the Special Presentations section at the 2017 Toronto International Film Festival. The story follows Tara, a stay at home mother, who is beginning to fall out of love with her husband, Mark, and their kids.

== Plot ==
Tara (Gemma Arterton) is a wife to Mark (Dominic Cooper) and a stay-at-home mother to two children, Teddy and Florrie. Tara goes to a nearby park and seems upset. There is a passage of time.

Tara and Mark are asleep in bed, when they are woken by a phone call. Tara resignedly has sex with Mark, during which she is in tears, unbeknownst to Mark. She helps Mark get ready for work, and takes the children to school. When she leaves the school she stops and stands outside, in distress. The following Saturday morning Tara wakes up early, trying not to wake up Mark. He does wake up and she reluctantly engages in sex with him, again in distress unnoticed by Mark. Following a visit to the park, Mark tries to have sex with her in one of the children's rooms, which she refuses. Mark questions whether she's having an affair which she denies and they argue. Later they're having a BBQ with friends and Mark berates her for not providing drinks for the guests. That evening they are having sex again, and Tara again is crying and in distress. Afterwards she repeatedly whispers that she is not happy, and after some brief discussion with Mark she says she's going to sleep. There is a passage of time.

Tara goes to London by herself, where she discovers and buys a book about the tapestries of The Lady and the Unicorn at a second-hand bookseller. Later that evening she discusses with Mark attending an art course and is upset that he does not understand how important it is to her, although he ultimately agrees that she should do whatever makes her happy. Later they go out for dinner, but they are both disconnected. A following morning, Tara takes the children to school and on the drive home stops at the Eurostar Ebbsfleet International railway station. She sits and watches the trains and forgets to pick the children up from school, arriving late. Teddy is particularly upset, and once home Tara becomes angry and swears at him for moving her book. Enraged, she leaves the house briefly then returns to apologise profusely to the children. Later that evening she discusses with Mark how she doesn't care about being a parent. The following day she discusses her issues with her mother, Alison, who is not supportive and tells her it's a phase. A following morning, Tara refuses to help with the children during breakfast. Mark takes the children to school and returns home to try and resolve things with her. Mark berates her, but ultimately apologises and tells her he just wants her to be happy. There is a passage of time.

Tara is increasingly detached and anxious. She knocks over a jug of orange juice while tidying up breakfast for which Mark berates her. She goes to the bedroom and packs a bag with clothes and her passport. Mark tries to stop her but she leaves in the car. Mark is upset and tries to calm the children. Tara goes to Ebbsfleet and takes a train to Paris.

Tara walks around Paris, happy. She stays overnight at a hotel. The following morning she travels by Paris Métro to the Musée national du Moyen Âge to see the tapestries of The Lady and the Unicorn. On the way in to the museum she passes a man with a camera. Later in the museum the man, Phillipe, takes photos of Tara and discusses the history of the tapestries with her. They both tell each they are not in a relationship. They spend the rest of the day together and end up having sex in Tara's hotel room. They are interrupted by a message on Phillipe's phone. Tara questions who the message is from, and Phillipe admits to being married and having a child. She tells him to leave, which he does. Tara listens to the pleading voicemails from Mark, her children, and her mother, while crying. She leaves the hotel and is extremely upset and anxious. Tara wakes up on the sofa the following morning. A French woman, Anna, took pity on her and she spent the night at her house. Anna counsels Tara about her life and tells her to try and change her life with her husband, but if that does not work, then do it without him. Mark has travelled to Paris, and Tara goes to meet him. They embrace. There is a passage of time.

The first scene of the story plays again, and it transpires that it was from the future. Tara is living in a different home. Tara goes to the park, and this time we hear she stops to see a mother and child playing together. She is upset, briefly, then continues to walk on.

== Cast ==
- Gemma Arterton as Tara
- Dominic Cooper as Mark
- Frances Barber as Alison
- Marthe Keller as Anna
- Jalil Lespert as Phillipe

== Production ==
The film was shot on location in Kent, London and Paris. Savage wrote a general treatment of the story, but all the dialogue was improvised.

Scenes were filmed in and around the Gravesend area in Kent, including Northfleet Nursery which was used as Tara’s son’s day centre. Imperial Business Park also features, as Tara’s local place for shopping. Production also filmed in and around Dartford, as well as at a nearby kids’ playground in Swanscombe. And a scene was also filmed at Ebbsfleet International Station, where Tara (Gemma Arterton) watches the trains on one occasion and later leaves for Paris.

Other shots were filmed in London, notably around the River Thames, on Waterloo Bridge and along the Queen's Walk at the Southbank Book Market in particular. The flat in the first and last scenes is located at 35 Goodge Street. Filming also took place in Paris, notably at the Musée de Cluny (National Museum of the Middle Ages), at the Tuileries Garden and in the 10th arrondissement, between the Gare du Nord and Boulevard de Bonne-Nouvelle.

== Reception ==
=== Box office ===
The Escape has grossed $12,074 in the United States and Canada, and $499,129 in other territories, for a worldwide total of $511,203.

=== Critical response ===
On review aggregator Rotten Tomatoes, the film holds an approval rating of 76%, based on 46 reviews, and an average rating of 6.45/10. The website's critical consensus reads, "The Escape probes gender mores while surveying the wreckage of a marriage — and offering the underrated Gemma Arterton another opportunity to prove her dramatic mettle." On Metacritic, the film holds a weighted average rating of 75 out of 100, based on 15 critics, indicating "generally favorable reviews".
