= Summerland (2020 film) =

2020 film directed by Jessica Swale

- Theatrical release poster
- Directed by: Jessica Swale
- Written by: Jessica Swale
- Produced by: Guy Heeley; Adrian Sturges
- Starring: Gemma Arterton; Gugu Mbatha-Raw; Lucas Bond; Dixie Egerickx; Siân Phillips; Penelope Wilton; Tom Courtenay
- Cinematography: Laurie Rose
- Edited by: Tania Reddin
- Music by: Volker Bertelmann
- Production companies: Shoebox Films; Iota Films
- Distributed by: Lionsgate UK
- Release date: 31 July 2020
- Running time: 99 minutes
- Country: United Kingdom
- Language: English
- Budget: £850,000
- Box office: $1,118,941 USD

Summerland is a 2020 British drama film written and directed by Jessica Swale, starring Gemma Arterton, Gugu Mbatha-Raw, Lucas Bond, Dixie Egerickx, Siân Phillips, Penelope Wilton and Tom Courtenay.

Arterton plays a reclusive writer forced to take in a young boy entrusted to her care during the Battle of Britain in 1940, and, later, during the early days of the London Blitz. It was released in the United Kingdom on 31 July 2020 by Lionsgate.

== Plot ==
In 1940 Alice Lamb, who is working on her typewriter, lives in a cottage by the seaside in Kent. She has lived in the village since before the start of WWII, during which time she tolerated the harassment by local children who thought she was a witch because she was a loner.

As part of the war effort, the brusque and reclusive writer is entrusted with the care of a young boy, Frank, who has been evacuated from London where it is unsafe. Alice had not volunteered to be a host and does not want to care for him as she fears it will interfere with her work researching mythology and folklore, but reluctantly agrees to let him stay believing that he has nowhere else to go and she will be able to be rid of him in a week.

As she begins to accept Frank's presence, she recalls her relationship with Vera, a fellow student at university who wanted to be a novelist and with whom she fell in love. Vera breaks Alice's heart when she decides to end their relationship not because their lesbianism was considered taboo, but because she has a strong desire to be a mother and it would not be possible with Alice.

Alice and Frank start to bond after he takes an interest in her scholarly work and she explains Fata Morgana mirages to him. She tells him about The Summerland, the pagan idea of the afterlife that existed all around them. However, at the end of their week together she is still willing to let him be transferred to another home. Alice changes her mind and decides to keep Frank with her after learning that moving him to a new family will require his moving to another village and school.

The day before Frank's birthday Alice is informed that his father has been killed in battle and she must break the news to him. As she was devastated by the similar loss of her father, Alice decided to delay telling Frank. While preparing a permanent room for him to stay in, she finds photographs of Frank and his parents in his scrapbook and is shocked to discover that his mother is Vera. At the same time, during an argument with a school friend, Frank finds out that his father has died. Hurt and angry because Alice had not told him, Frank runs away to be with his mother in London. Alice goes after him, and the two arrive in time to find his home destroyed and in flames after a bombing. Alice and Frank spend the night in an air raid shelter and head back to Kent the following morning.

While driving back to Kent, Frank yells at Alice to stop, jumps out and runs to the sea. Alice follows him onto the rocks, pleading with him that it is not safe and to come back. Frank shouts at her that she knew about his father's death and did not tell him. Distraught, Alice tells him that she wanted to but did not know how to and apologises. Frank says that he saw his father in Summerland. When he turns around, he slips and falls backward into the water. He flails under the water until Alice swims out to where he is and manages to rescue him. After helping him get out, both of them gasp and cough up water profusely.

The next morning, Alice brings Frank breakfast which he initially refuses. Alice reveals how she lost her father years earlier, and that she struggled to come to terms with it. She then shows him the room she prepared for him, comforting him when he becomes upset looking through some family photos.

When they return home a few days later, they find Vera waiting for them. She had not been home at the time of the bomb attacks. Vera confesses to having engineered the selection of Alice as the host for Frank because she knows that if anything were to happen to her, Alice would take care of him.

Back in the present time, Alice is in the process of completing her manuscript when Vera suddenly interrupts her. Having reunited some time ago, the two now live together. As they stroll along the beach, an adult Frank, who has come for a visit, joins them. Frank discovers the dedication in Alice's manuscript, and to his surprise, it is dedicated to him.

== Cast ==
- Gemma Arterton as Alice Lamb
- Penelope Wilton as Older Alice
- Gugu Mbatha-Raw as Vera
- Martina Laird as Older Vera
- Tom Courtenay as Mr Sullivan
- Lucas Bond as Frank
- Dixie Egerickx as Edie
- Siân Phillips as Margaret Corey
- Amanda Root as Mrs Lawrence
- Jessica Gunning as Mrs Bassett
- Amanda Lawrence as Muriel
- Dominic McGreevy as Boy
- Aoibhine McFlynn as Cassie
- Joshua Riley as Freddie

== Production ==
It was announced in April 2017 that Gemma Arterton had been cast in playwright Jessica Swale's directorial debut, with Swale also writing the screenplay. In May 2018, Gugu Mbatha-Raw, Penelope Wilton and Tom Courtenay were added to the cast.

Production was underway by September 2018, with filming locations across East Sussex in the towns Seaford and Brighton as well as in the county of Kent. During October 2018, locations in Kent included the Chatham Historic Dockyard and Anchor Wharf, with shots of Dover Castle in Dover. The Sail and Colour Loft exterior, Church Lane, and Ropery exterior of the Dockyard doubled as East London streets during the Blitz; the Captain's House on Officer's Terrace was featured as a bombed-out house; and the cellars of the Fitted Rigging House on the Wharf doubled as an air raid shelter. Production wrapped in the last week of October.

== Release ==
Embankment Films sold the United Kingdom distribution rights to Lionsgate UK on 31 October 2018. IFC Films acquired United States rights on 20 April 2020.

Summerland was released in the UK, and in selected theatres in the U.S., on 31 July 2020.

== Critical reception ==
On review aggregator Rotten Tomatoes, the film has a 78% rating based on reviews from 125 critics and an average rating of 6.5/10. The website's critical consensus states: "In Summerland, the living is a little too easy to raise dramatic stakes -- but Gemma Arterton's performance adds some much-needed extra heat." On Metacritic, the film has a weighted score of 56 out of 100, based on 22 critics, indicating "mixed or average reviews".

== Home media ==
Summerland was released on DVD in Region 2 by Lionsgate Home Entertainment on 12 October 2020. It was released on Blu-ray and DVD in Region A/1 by IFC Films on 17 November 2020.
