= Nell Gwynn (play) =

Play by Jessica Swale

Nell Gwynn is a play by the British playwright Jessica Swale, begun in 2013 and premiering at Shakespeare's Globe from 19 September to 17 October 2015. It deals with the life of Nell Gwynn, mistress of Charles II, and her part in the theatre of the 17th century. Gugu Mbatha-Raw played the title role in the production debut.

== Plot ==
Hearing Nell Gwynn heckle at the playhouse, Charles Hart decides to train her as an actress, just before women are first allowed on the London stage—the pair also become lovers. When Charles II grants permission for women to act, Nell joins Hart in the King's Company. Her admission to the Company is backed by its writer John Dryden, director Thomas Killigrew, and most of the actors except Edward Kynaston, who had previously played the company's female parts. Charles II continues his affair with Lady Castlemaine although his queen Catherine objects. Soon afterwards Charles sees Nell onstage and is greatly attracted to her. He visits her backstage and the pair begin an affair, which eventually leads to a rupture between her and Hart.

Nell also faces threats from Lady Castlemaine and from Charles's chief minister Arlington, who try to get her to give up Charles, or to choose between him and the theatre. These culminate in a violent attack on Nell's sister Rose, instigated by Arlington. Instead of giving up Charles, Nell moves into apartments provided by the king. She is visited by her sister Rose and their mother Ma Gwynn. Nell attends fewer rehearsals, leading to tensions with the Company. A French diplomatic party arrives and Arlington orchestrates Charles into taking Louise de Kéroualle as his mistress. When Charles and de Kéroualle attend the theatre, Nell publicly pokes fun at the French woman.

Rose visits Nell at court alone to announce Ma's death and berate Nell for not visiting them. On Nell's advice Charles dissolves the Exclusion Bill Parliament, including Arlington. Nell takes her revenge by having him appointed as the royal dog-walker. Nell and Charles live together happily, but Charles suffers an apoplectic fit (stroke) whilst they are playing croquet, dying soon afterwards. Nell is excluded from his deathbed. Soon afterwards, she decides to return to King's Company full-time, reconcile with Hart and appear in Dryden's Tyrannick Love. As she is out of practice, she gives the lead role to Kynaston, but insists on speaking an epilogue which she writes; it closes both Dryden's and Swale's plays.

== Cast and characters ==
	Shakespeare's Globe, 2015	West End, 2016	UK Tour, 2017	US Premiere, 2018	East Coast Premiere, 2019
Nell Gwynn	Gugu Mbatha-Raw	Gemma Arterton	Laura Pitt-Pulford	Scarlett Strallen	Alison Luff
Thomas Killigrew	Richard Katz	Michael Garner	Clive Hayward	Brett Tuomi	Nigel Gore
Lord Arlington	David Rintoul		Michael Cochrane	Larry Yando	Jeff Keogh
Nancy	Amanda Lawrence	Michele Dotrice	Mossie Smith	Natalie West	Catherine Flye (and Ma Gwynn)
John Dryden	Graham Butler	Nicholas Shaw	Nicholas Bishop	Christopher Sheard	Michael Glenn
Lady Castlemaine / Louise de Kéroualle	Sasha Waddell		Pandora Clifford	Emily Gardner Xu Hall	Regina Aquino
Rose Gwynn	Anneika Rose		Pepter Lunkuse	Emma Ladji	Caitlin Cisco
Ned Spigget	Angus Imrie	Peter McGovern	George Jennings	Richard David	Alex Michell
Edward Kynaston	Greg Haiste		Esh Alladi	David Bedella	Christopher Dinolfo
Queen Katherine / Old Ma Gwynn	Sarah Woodward		Joanne Howarth	Hollis Resnik	Zoe Speas (Queen Katherine only)
Charles Hart	Jay Taylor		Sam Marks	John Tufts	Quinn Franzen
Charles II	David Sturzaker		Ben Righton	Timothy Edward Kane	R.J. Foster

== Premiere production ==
Playwright Jessica Swale and star Gugu Mbatha-Raw were long-term friends before making the play. The play courted controversy because Mbatha-Raw, a mixed-race woman, was cast to play Nell Gwynn, a historical white figure. Playwright Swale defended the choice saying, "It's sort of frustrating that the question comes up, but I think it's really important to say that it's not a factor." Mbatha-Raw expressed frustration with the issue of her race being raised, saying, "I've played Juliet and she's supposed to be Italian, and I'm not Italian, and I've played Ophelia and she was in theory Danish. I think with theatre hopefully if you have the essence of a person it doesn't matter so much what you look like." Mbatha-Raw was nominated for Best Actress at the 2015 Evening Standard Theatre Awards for the role.

The premiere production transferred to the Apollo Theatre, where it played from 4 February to 30 April 2016, with the lead role taken over by Gemma Arterton. The play was revived as a touring production by English Touring Theatre in 2017 with Laura Pitt-Pulford as Nell, including a run at Shakespeare's Globe in May.

== Subsequent productions ==
Original director Christopher Luscombe helmed the US premiere of the play at the Chicago Shakespeare Theater from 20 September to 4 November 2018. The cast consisted of both local Chicago actors and veteran West End actors Scarlett Strallen as Nell Gwynn and David Bedella as Edward Kynaston.

In 2019, Robert Richmond directed the East Coast premiere at Folger Theatre (January 29 - March 10) in a production that featured Broadway's Alison Luff as Nell Gwynn, Quinn Franzen as Charles Hart, and R. J. Foster as King Charles II.

Bristol Old Vic Theatre School put on a production of the play at the Tobacco Factory Theatres in Bristol, UK from 13-20 June 2026. It was co-directed by Emma Callander and Paloma Oakenfold, with set design by Lydia Durnall and costume design by Mette Rutter.

A 2026 co-production by Shakespeare North Playhouse, Theatre by the Lake, and Storyhouse was directed by Bryony Shanahan, with set and costume design by Jess Curtis. Rose Shalloo and Guy Woolf played Nell and King Charles respectively. After opening at the Shakespeare North Playhouse in Prescot, UK, from 12 June to 4 July 2026, and a subsequent run at Theatre by the Lake in Keswick, the production transferred to the Grosvenor Park Open Air Theatre in Chester from 22 August to 6 September 2026.

== Adaptation ==
A film adaptation is currently in development ("sold to Hollywood for screen adaptation"),

== Awards and nominations ==
=== Original West End Production ===
Year	Award	Category	Nominee	Result
2015	Evening Standard Awards	Best Actress	Gugu Mbatha-Raw	Nominated
2016	Laurence Olivier Awards	Best New Comedy		Won
2016	Laurence Olivier Awards	Best Actress	Gemma Arterton	Nominated
2016	Laurence Olivier Awards	Best Actress in a Supporting Role	Michele Dotrice	Nominated
2016	Laurence Olivier Awards	Best Costume Design	Hugh Durrant	Nominated
