= Lucas Bond =

British actor

- Born: 14 December 2005 (age 20); United Kingdom
- Education: Beechen Cliff School, Bath
- Occupation: Actor
- Years active: 2015–present
- Relatives: Jamiela Bond - Sibling; Kit Bond - Sibling; Lara Bond - Sibling

Lucas Bond (born 14 December 2005) is a British actor. He is best known for his roles in Slumber (2017) and Summerland (2020).

== Education ==
Bond was a pupil at Beechen Cliff School, which is a state day and boarding school for boys in Bath, South West England.

== Career ==
Lucas Bond made his acting debut in 2015, appearing in the horror movie Lady of Csejte. He plays Gerry in the 2015 British fantasy film Molly Moon and the Incredible Book of Hypnotism. In 2016 he appeared in two episodes of the American television drama series Of Kings and Prophets. In 2017, he played Daniel Morgan in the American-British supernatural horror-thriller film Slumber, he also appeared in an episode of The Miniaturist. In 2020 he played Frank, an evacuee from the London Blitz during World War II, in the British drama film Summerland.

== Filmography ==
=== Films ===
Year	Title	Role	Notes
2015	Lady of Csejte	Mischa	
2015	Molly Moon and the Incredible Book of Hypnotism	Gerry	
2017	Slumber	Daniel Morgan	
2018	Susu	Young Benjamin	
2019	The Cleansing Hour	Young Max	
2020	Summerland	Frank	
2020	The Lady of Heaven	Jamal	

=== Television ===
Year	Title	Role	Notes
2016	Of Kings and Prophets	Taavi	2 episodes
2017	Unspeakable	Ben	TV movie
2017	The Miniaturist	Carel Oortman	1 episode
2020	The Angel of Darkness	Paulie	4 episodes
2022	Andor	Young Cassian Andor	2 episodes
