= Leading Lady Parts =

2018 short film directed by Jessica Swale

- Written by: Jessica Swale
- Directed by: Jessica Swale
- Country of origin: United Kingdom
- Original language: English

Production
- Producer: Gemma Arterton
- Running time: 8 minutes
- Production company: Rebel Park Productions

Original release
- Network: BBC Four
- Release: 30 July 2018

Leading Lady Parts is a 2018 British comedy short film written and directed by Jessica Swale. Inspired by the Time's Up movement, the film stars several A-list actresses auditioning for a leading lady role, offering a critique of the casting process. It premiered on BBC Four in 2018 and is available for free on YouTube.

== Synopsis ==
Several A-list actresses are auditioning for the "leading lady part" in an untitled film. The casting directors have a very specific idea of what a "leading lady" should be. They have increasingly ridiculous and insulting requests of the actresses, including comments on their minds, bodies, ages, and skin colors. They interrupt any actress during their audition, and two women aren't allowed to read for the part at all. Finally, Tom Hiddleston enters the room, and he is immediately cast upon introducing himself. In the last scene, Gemma Chan is speaking with someone on her phone after her audition, while walking by parody movie posters in which each lead actress is Hiddleston.

== Cast ==
- Catherine Tate as Panelist 1 (Boss)
- Gemma Arterton as Panelist 2
- Anthony Welsh as Panelist 3
- Emilia Clarke as Actress 1
- Stacy Martin as Actress 2
- Felicity Jones as Actress 3
- Florence Pugh as Actress 4
- Gemma Chan as Actress 5
- Lena Headey as Actress 6
- Wunmi Mosaku as Actress 7
- Katie Leung as Assistant
- Tom Hiddleston as Actor

== Production ==
The idea for a film inspired by the Time's Up movement was put forth by British actress Gemma Arterton after she had attended several meetings as part of the movement. Jessica Swale wrote the script and within three weeks the cast and funding had been secured. It was filmed over the span of a few days at Warner Bros. Studio, Leavesden. The film was produced by Arterton's production company Rebel Park Productions, with Arterton crediting Felicity Jones for the idea of the film as a collaboration.

Actresses who appear as themselves in the film include Gemma Chan, Emilia Clarke, Lena Headey, Felicity Jones, Wunmi Mosaku, Katie Leung, Stacy Martin, and Florence Pugh. The casting directors were played by Gemma Arterton, Catherine Tate, and Anthony Welsh. While the film was originally to be produced by an all-female crew, this proved impossible for the filmmakers. The film is the first in a planned series of short films that address similar issues relating to the Time's Up and Me Too movements.
