= Dixie Egerickx =

English actress (born 2005)

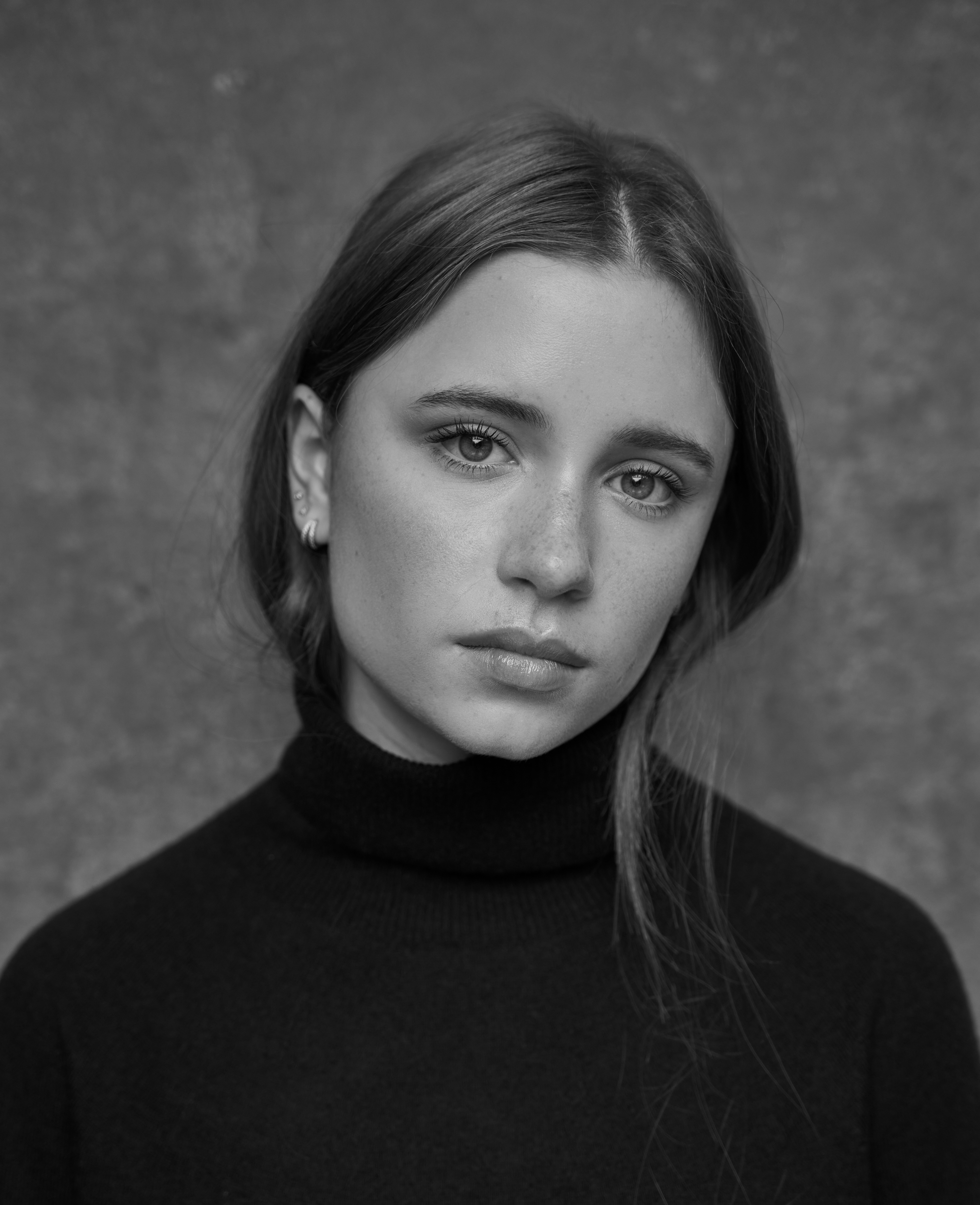
- Egerickx in 2023
- Born: Dixie Violet Egerickx; 31 October 2005 (age 20); London, England
- Occupation: Actress
- Years active: 2015–present

Dixie Violet Egerickx (born 31 October 2005) is an English actress. Her films include The Little Stranger (2018), Summerland and The Secret Garden (both 2020).

== Early life ==
Dixie Violet Egerickx is from West London. She attended Knightsbridge School, Bute House Preparatory School, and Latymer Upper School. She was scouted at the age of 8 by casting director Kate Bone of Nina Gold Casting.

== Career ==
In 2015, Egerickx appeared on the London stage as Iphigenia in Robert Icke's adaptation of Oresteia. She had further roles as Rosalind in Alexi Kay Campbell's Sunset at the Villa Thalia at the National Theatre and Jenny Caroline Marx in Richard Bean and Clive Coleman's Young Marx at The Bridge Theatre, directed by Sir Nicholas Hytner. She made her television debut in the television film Churchill's Secret.

Egerickx appeared in the 2017 National Geographic series Genius and the 2018 series Patrick Melrose. Also in 2018, she made her feature film debut in The Little Stranger. Egerickx appeared on Screen International's Screen Stars of Tomorrow list in 2019 at the age of 13.

Egerickx starred as Edie in the 2020 drama film Summerland, and portrayed Mary Lennox in the 2020 film The Secret Garden. In 2019, she filmed HBO's Unaired Game of Thrones Prequel Pilot and can currently be seen in the role of Jo Ransome in the Apple TV+ miniseries The Essex Serpent, directed by Clio Barnard. In 2023, Egerickx completed filming the role of Anna in the feature film Rich Flu, directed by Galder Gaztelu-Urrutia.

On July 25, 2026, it was announced that she was cast to play the character Katie Wilmot in the Amazon Prime Video television adaptation of the Boys of Tommen book series, written by Chloe Walsh.

== Filmography ==
=== Films ===
Year	Title	Role	Notes
2017	The Wyrd	Beda	Short film
2017	Mirette	Mirette	Short film
2018	The Little Stranger	Gillian Baker-Hyde	
2020	The Secret Garden	Mary	
2020	Summerland	Edie	
2024	Rich Flu	Anna	

=== Television ===
Year	Title	Role	Notes
2016	Churchill's Secret	Young Sarah	TV film
2017	A Royal Winter	Katya	TV film
2017	Genius	Alice Edwards	Episode: "Einstein: Chapter Ten"
2017	The Watcher in the Woods	Ellie Carstairs	TV film
2018	Patrick Melrose	Lucy	Episode: "Mother's Milk"
2022	The Essex Serpent	Jo Ransome	
2027	Boys of Tommen	Katie Wilmot	Upcoming series; filming

=== Stage ===
Date	Title	Role	Notes
2015	Oresteia	Iphigenia	
2017	Young Marx	Jenny Caroline 'Qui Qui' Marx	The Bridge Theatre
