= We Live in Time =

2024 film by John Crowley

- Theatrical release poster
- Directed by: John Crowley
- Written by: Nick Payne
- Produced by: Adam Ackland; Leah Clarke; Guy Heeley
- Starring: Andrew Garfield; Florence Pugh
- Cinematography: Stuart Bentley
- Edited by: Justine Wright
- Music by: Bryce Dessner
- Production companies: Film4; SunnyMarch
- Distributed by: A24 (United States); StudioCanal (United Kingdom and France)
- Release dates: 6 September 2024 (TIFF); 11 October 2024 (United States); 1 January 2025 (United Kingdom and France)
- Running time: 108 minutes
- Countries: France; United Kingdom
- Language: English
- Budget: $20 million
- Box office: $58.7 million

We Live in Time is a 2024 romantic drama film directed by John Crowley and written by Nick Payne. It follows the relationship of a couple, Tobias Durand (Andrew Garfield) and Almut Brühl (Florence Pugh), over the course of a decade. The film uses nonlinear narrative.

The film premiered at the Toronto International Film Festival on 6 September 2024. It was released in the United States on 11 October 2024 by A24 and on 1 January 2025 by StudioCanal in the United Kingdom and France. It has grossed $58.7 million worldwide, and received generally positive reviews from critics, particularly praising the performances and chemistry of Garfield and Pugh.

== Plot ==
Weetabix IT staffer Tobias Durand, while purchasing a pen to sign divorce papers, is struck by a car driven by Almut Brühl, a former figure skater turned Bavarian-fusion chef. At the hospital, Almut offers to treat Tobias and his wife to a meal at the restaurant she is about to open, though Tobias does not disclose his divorce. The now separated Tobias goes to the restaurant alone, and reveals his divorce to Almut. They are attracted to each other and go to Almut's afterward and have sex. Spending the following day together, Almut cooks for Tobias, showing him the best way to crack an egg. Months later, after Almut says she is ambivalent about having children, Tobias asks her if she might one day change her mind. He says he hopes to one day have a family with her, as he is falling in love with her. She rudely rebuffs him, revealing she can't make that sort of a promise, so he leaves in silence. Later, at a baby shower for one of Almut's co-workers, Tobias apologises to Almut for his insensitivity, while also criticising her rude response. He once again professes his love, recognising he had focused on looking ahead, rather than what they had right now together, so they reconcile.

After experiencing extreme abdominal pains, Almut discovers that she has ovarian cancer. She is advised to get a partial or full hysterectomy. Tobias promises to respect Almut's decision, and she chooses to undergo a partial hysterectomy, as she says she might want to have a child with him. The cancer goes into remission and, after numerous attempts to conceive, the couple are happily successful. On New Year's Eve Almut goes into labour. Tobias gets her to the hospital only for them to be sent home as she is not dilated enough. They go home together to wait. Later that night Almut gives birth to a baby girl in a petrol station bathroom, as they get stuck in a traffic jam on their way back.

Three years later the family are living in a small cottage and farm. Almut again feels sharp pain in her abdomen. The cancer has returned to stage 3, so she would need to begin chemotherapy immediately before tumour removal surgery, although there is no survival guarantee. Almut, hesitant to undergo treatment again, proposes living "six to eight amazing months" without any treatment, instead of spending her potential 12 months weak and unfit if the chemo is unsuccessful. They explain the situation to their young daughter, Ella. Tobias also proposes to Almut, and she accepts and decides to undergo treatment.

Around the same time as her diagnosis, Almut is invited by her colleague Simon to participate in the prestigious cooking competition Bocuse d'Or. Despite her training conflicting with both her treatment and her wedding, she agrees to compete. Almut and her commis Jade win the UK contest, reaching the European finals, which is set to take place on their proposed wedding day. Almut secretly begins training for the Bocuse d'Or finals.

Almut and Tobias find out the treatment has not shrunk her cancer. After failing to pick up their daughter from nursery school one day, Tobias asks Almut what she is doing and she responds that she has been training for the Bocuse d'Or. Tobias angrily scolds her for secretly choosing the competition over focusing on her treatment and family. Almut responds she prefers that her daughter will remember her with pride as an accomplished chef who did not give up, rather than merely someone she watched fall ill and die. Accepting this, Tobias begrudgingly cancels their wedding.

In June in Italy, Tobias and Ella watch Almut cook in the Bocuse d'Or finals. Towards the competition's end, becoming weaker, she falters while plating the last dish. Jade takes control, and they successfully finish in time. Almut takes in the moment and then chooses to leave with Tobias and Ella. Afterwards she takes them ice skating, something she could not bring herself to do before, as it brought back painful memories of her father.

Some time later, Tobias and Ella return home after visiting their chicken coop, alongside their new dog, which Almut and Tobias had earlier spoken about getting to help Ella cope with death. Tobias then teaches her how to crack an egg, just like Almut.

== Cast ==
- Andrew Garfield as Tobias
- Florence Pugh as Almut
- Grace Delaney as Ella
- Lee Braithwaite as Jade
- Aoife Hinds as Skye
- Adam James as Simon Maxson
- Douglas Hodge as Reginald
- Amy Morgan as Leah
- Niamh Cusack as Sylvia
- Lucy Briers as Kerri Weaver, a doctor
- Robert Boulter as Hernandez, a doctor
- Nikhil Parmar as Sanjay
- Kerry Godliman as Jane
- Heather Craney as Buffy Jones
- Marama Corlett as Adrienne Duvall

== Production ==
Nick Payne developed the script for We Live in Time with StudioCanal. The film was executive produced by Benedict Cumberbatch with his London-based company SunnyMarch; other producers are Leah Clarke, Adam Ackland for SunnyMarch, Guy Heeley for Shoebox Films, as well as Ron Halpern and Joe Naftalin for StudioCanal.

In March 2023, Andrew Garfield and Florence Pugh were in talks to star in the film, which was announced shortly after Garfield and Pugh presented an award together at the 95th Academy Awards. Principal photography began in London in April 2023, with cast and crew reported in Herne Hill. Later that month, they were spotted at a Co-op in Blackfen.

=== Music ===
The film's score was produced by Bryce Dessner. Romy and Sampha performed the film's credits song, "I'm on Your Team".

The film also features songs such as

- "Is It a Sin?"
  - Written by: Al Hazan
  - Performed by: Allie Hazan
- "I Dare You"
  - Written by: Jamie XX (as Smith), Oliver Sim (as Sim), and Romy Madley-Croft (as Madley Croft)
  - Performed by: The xx
- "King"
  - Written by: Mikey Goldsworthy (as Michael Thomas Goldsworthy), Mark Ralph, Andrew Smith, Olly Alexander (as Oliver Alexander Thornton), and Emre Turkmen (as Resul Emre Turkmen)
- "I'm on Your Team"
  - Performed by: Romy and Sampha
- "Golden Days"
  - Performed by: Chris Brain

== Release ==
In May 2023, A24 acquired American distribution rights to the film. StudioCanal handled worldwide sales and will distribute directly in France, the United Kingdom, Germany, Poland, the Benelux, Australia and New Zealand. A first look image of the film displaying the leads sharing a "cute scene" became an internet meme due to the presence of an "ugly carousel horse" in frame.

We Live in Time premiered at the Toronto International Film Festival on 6 September 2024. For its European premiere, it was selected to close the official selection of the 72nd San Sebastián International Film Festival, playing out of competition. A24 scheduled the film for a limited theatrical release in the United States on 11 October 2024 and for a wide theatrical release from 18 October 2024. The film was released theatrically in the United Kingdom, Ireland and France on 1 January 2025. Beta Fiction Spain released theatrically the film in Spain on 3 January 2025.

== Reception ==
=== Box office ===
As of 14 January 2025, We Live in Time has grossed $24.7 million in the United States and Canada, and $32.7 million in other territories, for a worldwide total of $58.7 million.

In its limited opening weekend in the United States and Canada, the film made $232,615 from five theaters, an average of $46,523 per venue. Expanding to 985 theaters the following weekend the film made $4.2 million, finishing in fifth. Playing in 2,968 theaters in its third weekend, the film made $4.8 million and remained in fifth place. The film then made $3.5 million and $2.2 million in its fourth and fifth weekends, respectively.

=== Critical response ===
On the review aggregator website Rotten Tomatoes, 79% of 220 critics' reviews are positive, with an average rating of 7.0/10. The website's consensus reads: "Andrew Garfield and Florence Pugh's palpable chemistry will snatch audiences' hearts before breaking them in We Live in Time, a powerful melodrama that uses its nonlinear structure to thoughtfully explore grief." Metacritic, which uses a weighted average, assigned the film a score of 58 out of 100, based on 38 critics, indicating "mixed or average" reviews. Audiences surveyed by PostTrak gave the film an 83% overall positive score, with 63% saying they would definitely recommend it.

Benjamin Lee, for The Guardian, gave the film 4 stars out of 5 and wrote, "I found its throwback nature to be immensely charming, a big, full-throated romantic drama that knows exactly how to make us swoon as well as make us sad. I hope there’s time for more like it."

In her review for The New York Times, Manohla Dargis praised the character of Almut, and Pugh's performance but found the film only "trie[d] to be modern".

Brianna Zigler, writing for The A.V. Club, called the film "unimaginative and weirdly regressive," and opined that Garfield and Pugh, while "likable and sweet" were also "thin" and "boring", and were not convincing in their depiction of their characters' relationship. Zigler also did not think Almut's decisions regarding her cancer and motherhood were plausible.

Brian Tallerico at RogerEbert.com, who gave the film 3 out of 4 stars, said that Pugh and Garfield elevated what was otherwise a shallow script, and singled out Garfield in particular as the standout performance. On the nonlinear narrative, Tallerico thought that while appearing to be random at first glance, it exhibited "an emotional logic" upon a closer examination, in a way that evoked the way a person may remember key moments in their life as it comes to an end. Tallerico was uncertain if there were not too many time jumps, commenting, "The chronological jumble will be a dealbreaker for some people who like their weepers straightforward", but speculated that the challenge in making this structure work is what attracted the actors to the project in the first place.

Reviewing the film for Variety, Peter Debrugge thought the sequences in which the scenes were laid out was arbitrary, and in a way that made mapping out nonlinear narrative difficult. Debrugge wondered if there was a "way to unscramble" the film. Glenn Whipp of the Los Angeles Times had a similar appraisal of the sequencing of the scenes, which he felt did not elevate the film's concept. While Whipp praised Pugh and Garfield, he felt that the film's execution of the non-linear structure distanced the audience from the two performers, rendering Almut and Tobias as concepts rather than characters.
