= Florence Pugh =

English actress (born 1996)

- Pugh at the 2026 BFI London Film Festival
- Born: 3 January 1996 (age 30); Oxford, England
- Occupation: Actress
- Years active: 2014–present
- Relatives: Toby Sebastian (brother)
- Awards: Full list

Florence Pugh (/pjuː/ PEW; born 3 January 1996) is an English actress. Her accolades include a British Independent Film Award and three Critics' Choice Awards, in addition to nominations for an Academy Award and three BAFTA Awards.

After making her acting debut in the drama film The Falling (2014), Pugh gained praise for starring in the independent drama Lady Macbeth (2016) and the miniseries The Little Drummer Girl (2018). Her international breakthrough came in 2019 with her portrayals of professional wrestler Paige in the sports film Fighting with My Family, Dani Ardor in the horror film Midsommar, and Amy March in the period drama Little Women. For the last of these, she was nominated for the Academy Award for Best Supporting Actress.

Pugh has played Yelena Belova / Black Widow in the Marvel Cinematic Universe, starring in the films Black Widow (2021), Thunderbolts* (2025), and Spider-Man: Brand New Day (2026), as well as the Disney+ miniseries Hawkeye (2021). In her highest-grossing releases, she voiced Goldilocks in Puss in Boots: The Last Wish (2022), and portrayed Jean Tatlock in Oppenheimer (2023) and Princess Irulan in Dune: Part Two (2024); she also continued to gain praise for her performances in dramas such as We Live in Time (2024) and East of Eden (2026).

== Early life ==
Florence Pugh was born on 3 January 1996 in Oxford to dancer Deborah and restaurateur Clinton Pugh. She has three siblings: actor and musician Toby Sebastian, actress Arabella Gibbins, and Rafaela "Raffie" Pugh. As a child she suffered from tracheomalacia, which caused breathing problems and led to frequent hospitalisations. The family moved to Manilva in Spain when Pugh was three, hoping the warmer climate would improve her health. They lived there until she was six, when they returned to Oxford.

She was educated privately at Wychwood School and St Edward's School, Oxford, but disliked the lack of support for her acting ambitions.

== Career ==
=== 2014–2019: Early roles and breakthrough ===
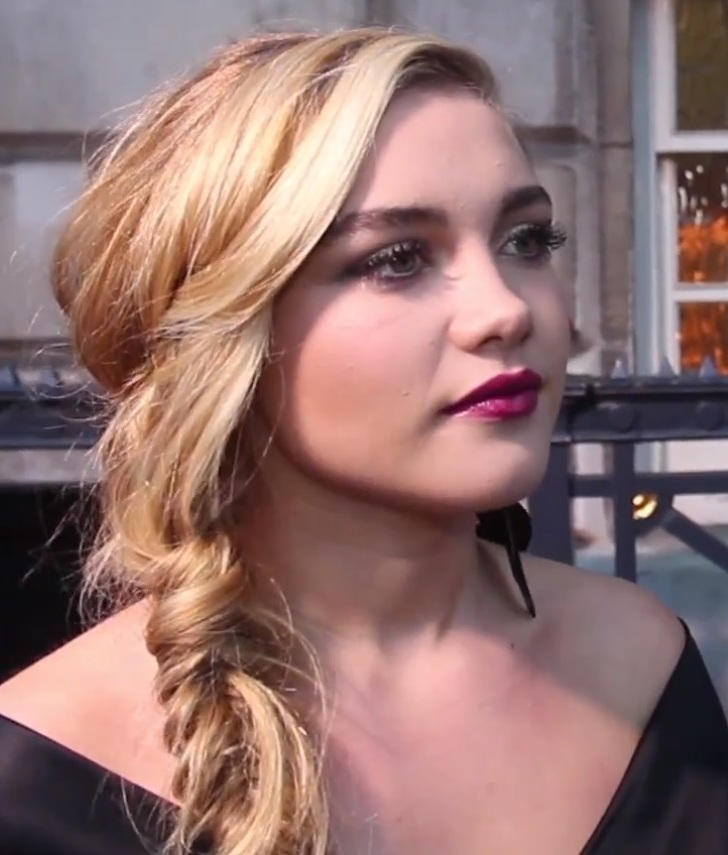
Pugh at the 2014 BFI London Film Festival

While still studying in sixth form, Pugh made her professional acting debut in the 2014 drama, The Falling, playing a precocious teenager opposite Maisie Williams. Tara Brady of The Irish Times deemed Pugh "remarkable", while IndieWire's Oliver Lyttelton called her "striking". In the same year, Pugh was nominated for Best British Newcomer at the BFI London Film Festival as well as for Young British / Irish Performer of the Year by the London Film Critics' Circle. The next year, she was cast as a singer-songwriter in the dramedy pilot Studio City, co-starring Eric McCormack as the character's father. The pilot was not picked up to series. Pugh later characterised her experience on Studio City negatively due to pressures to change her appearance.

In 2016, Pugh starred in the independent drama Lady Macbeth, a film based on Nikolai Leskov's novella Lady Macbeth of the Mtsensk District, and appeared in the first series of the ITV detective series Marcella. In the former, she played Katherine, an unhappily married bride who grows violent. Pugh attributed her attraction to the part to her partiality to characters with "confusing or at least interesting" motivations. The role earned her acclaim. She also credited the production with reviving her interest in cinema after being dispirited by Studio City. Reviewing the film for Variety, Guy Lodge commended her portrayal of the character's "complex, under-the-skin transformation". She won the BIFA for Best Performance by an Actress in a British Independent Film for the role.

In 2018, Pugh was nominated for the BAFTA Rising Star Award at the 71st British Academy Film Awards. She then played Cordelia to Anthony Hopkins's titular King Lear in Richard Eyre's television film King Lear and appeared in the short film Leading Lady Parts in support of the Time's Up initiative. Later that year, Pugh portrayed Elizabeth de Burgh in the Netflix historical film Outlaw King, co-starring Chris Pine as Robert the Bruce. Charles Bramesco of The Guardian found her to be "excellent despite her thankless role". She next starred in a six-part miniseries adaptation of John le Carré's spy novel The Little Drummer Girl, in which she played an actress who becomes embroiled in an espionage plot. Her performance was met with praise. While divided on the series overall, Richard Lawson of Vanity Fair called Pugh "terrific throughout" and added that she "smartly mixes earthiness with sophistication, wisdom with naïveté."

Pugh starred in three major films in 2019, during which she was recognised as having experienced an international breakthrough. She first played professional wrestler Paige in Fighting with My Family, a comedy-drama about Paige's career. The film premiered at the 2019 Sundance Film Festival to positive reviews. Geoffrey Macnab of The Independent called Pugh "completely convincing as the wrestler", adding that she showed "the same defiance, scruffy glamour and self-deprecating humour as the real life ... Paige". Pugh next headlined Ari Aster's horror film Midsommar, which chronicles an American couple, played by her and Jack Reynor, who travel to Sweden and encounter a cult. Critics complimented Pugh's portrayal of the desolate Dani Ardor, with David Edelstein of Vulture calling it "amazingly vivid".

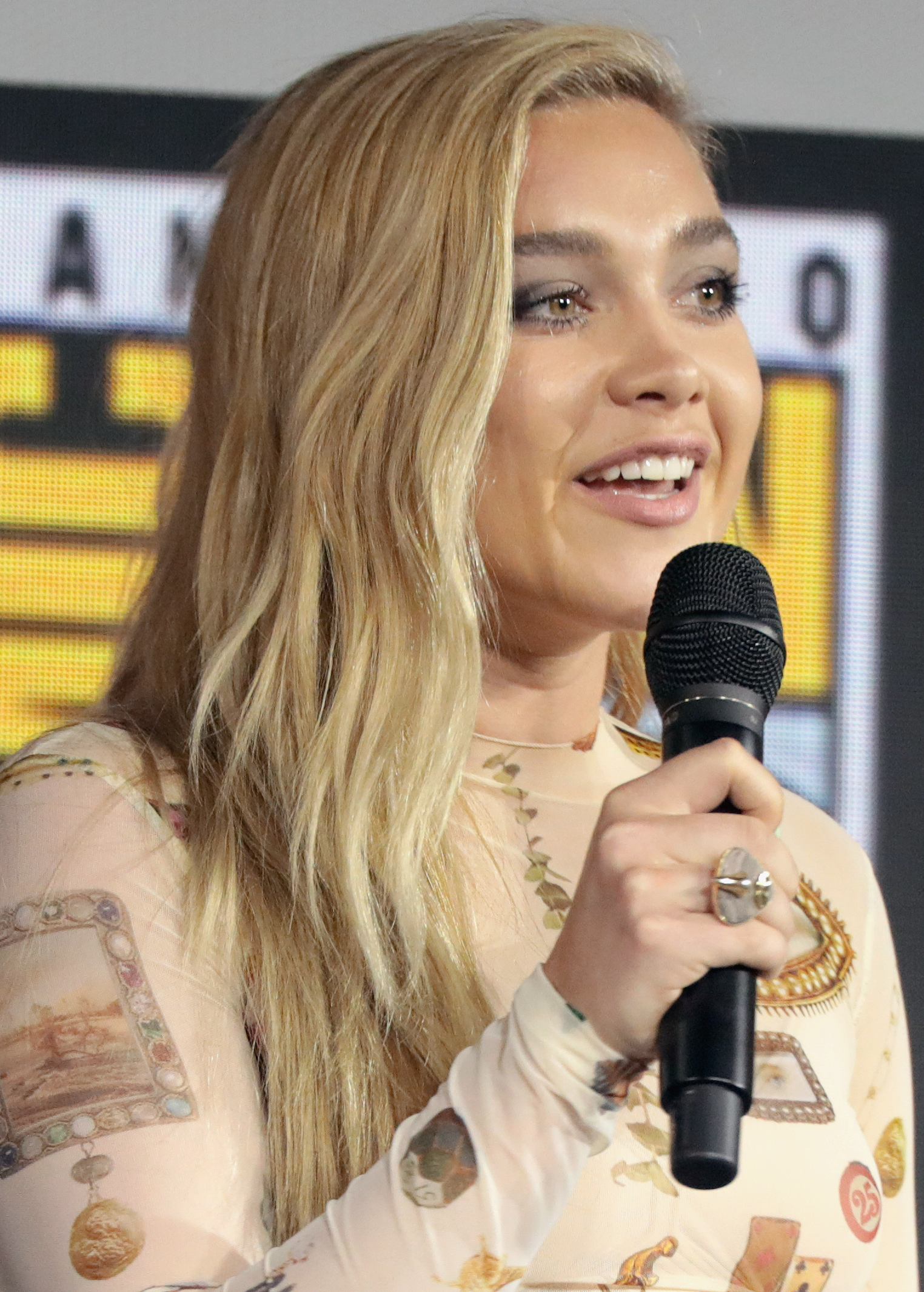
Pugh at the 2019 San Diego Comic-Con

In her final film release of the year, Pugh starred in Little Women, a period drama film adaptation of Louisa May Alcott's novel of the same name directed by Greta Gerwig. She portrayed Amy March, a fickle artist, from age 12 into adulthood, and has said that the character is in a "sweet spot of not knowing how to deal with her emotions". The film received critical acclaim and grossed $209 million. In his review, David Rooney of The Hollywood Reporter praised the "disarming grace, humor and a willful streak that grows almost imperceptibly into wisdom" with which Pugh managed the part's "tricky contradictions". Pugh earned nominations for the BAFTA and Academy Award for Best Supporting Actress for her performance.

=== 2020–present: Expansion and acclaim ===
Pugh portrayed Yelena Belova, a spy, in the Marvel Cinematic Universe superhero film Black Widow. She said the film was about "girls who are stolen from around the world". Released in 2021, it garnered positive reviews from critics, who highlighted Pugh's performance. Caryn James of BBC Culture credited Pugh for making Belova "the most vibrant person in the film, more lived-in than most action-movie characters". She reprised the role in the Disney+ series Hawkeye later in the year. In 2022, Pugh starred in the thriller Don't Worry Darling, directed by Olivia Wilde, and the drama The Wonder, an adaptation of Emma Donoghue's namesake novel. While filming the former, she allegedly clashed with Wilde, causing her to limit the amount of promotion she did for the film. Don't Worry Darling premiered at the 79th Venice International Film Festival, where critics deemed Pugh's performance superior to the film. In The Wonder, she played a nurse in 1862 who is sent to investigate an alleged supernatural miracle. Kevin Maher of The Times found Pugh's "impossibly vivid and convincing" performance to be the film's prime asset. In her final release of the year, she voiced Goldilocks in the DreamWorks animated film Puss in Boots: The Last Wish, which earned over $480 million worldwide.

Zach Braff's drama film A Good Person (2023), in which Pugh starred as a car crash survivor, marked her first producing venture. Instead of opting for a wig, Pugh cut off her own hair for the part. She also wrote and sang two songs, "The Best Part" and "I Hate Myself", for the film's soundtrack. In Christopher Nolan's biographical film Oppenheimer, starring Cillian Murphy in the title role, Pugh played Communist Party USA member Jean Tatlock. Empire's Dan Jolin wrote that she "elegantly dominate[s] her few scenes". With a worldwide gross of over $967 million, Oppenheimer is Pugh's highest-grossing release. Pugh next played Princess Irulan in Dune: Part Two, a sequel to the 2021 science fiction film. Released in 2024, the film garnered positive reviews and grossed over $711 million worldwide. Andrew Garfield and Pugh starred as a couple navigating cancer in John Crowley's romantic drama We Live in Time. She shaved her head for her role in the film. Glenn Whipp of the Los Angeles Times deemed her performance to be the production's prime asset.

In 2025, Pugh reprised the role of Yelena Belova in Thunderbolts*. She insisted on filming the scene where Belova jumps from the top of Merdeka 118 without using stunt doubles. Marvel Studios was initially reluctant to allow Pugh to perform the stunt due to insurance concerns, but after her persistent efforts, including discussions with Kevin Feige, she was permitted to perform the jump. Pugh stated her reasoning being: "It's our duty as actors to protect and defend your characters and to put in the life. There's so much that's on the page, but it's really what you add to it in the last 20% that actually makes every character that any actor plays. There's so many -isms that I was very welcomed into putting into the movie." The film and Pugh's performance received positive reviews from critics. The following year she reprised the role in Spider-Man: Brand New Day (2026).

Pugh gained critical attention for her portrayal of Cathy Ames in Netflix limited series adaptation of John Steinbeck's novel East of Eden (2026) starring opposite Christopher Abbott and Mike Faist. She also served as a executive producer of the project. Caroline Darya Framke of The New York Times wrote "Pugh...does her part to flesh Cathy out with a performance that is sensational in dramatic moments and heartbreakingly precise in quieter ones. The choice to root Cathy’s ruthlessness in something so human as trauma is a risk, but one both the writer and actress take on with care." She will reprise her roles as Yelena Belova in Avengers: Doomsday and Princess Irulan in Dune: Part Three.

== Public image ==
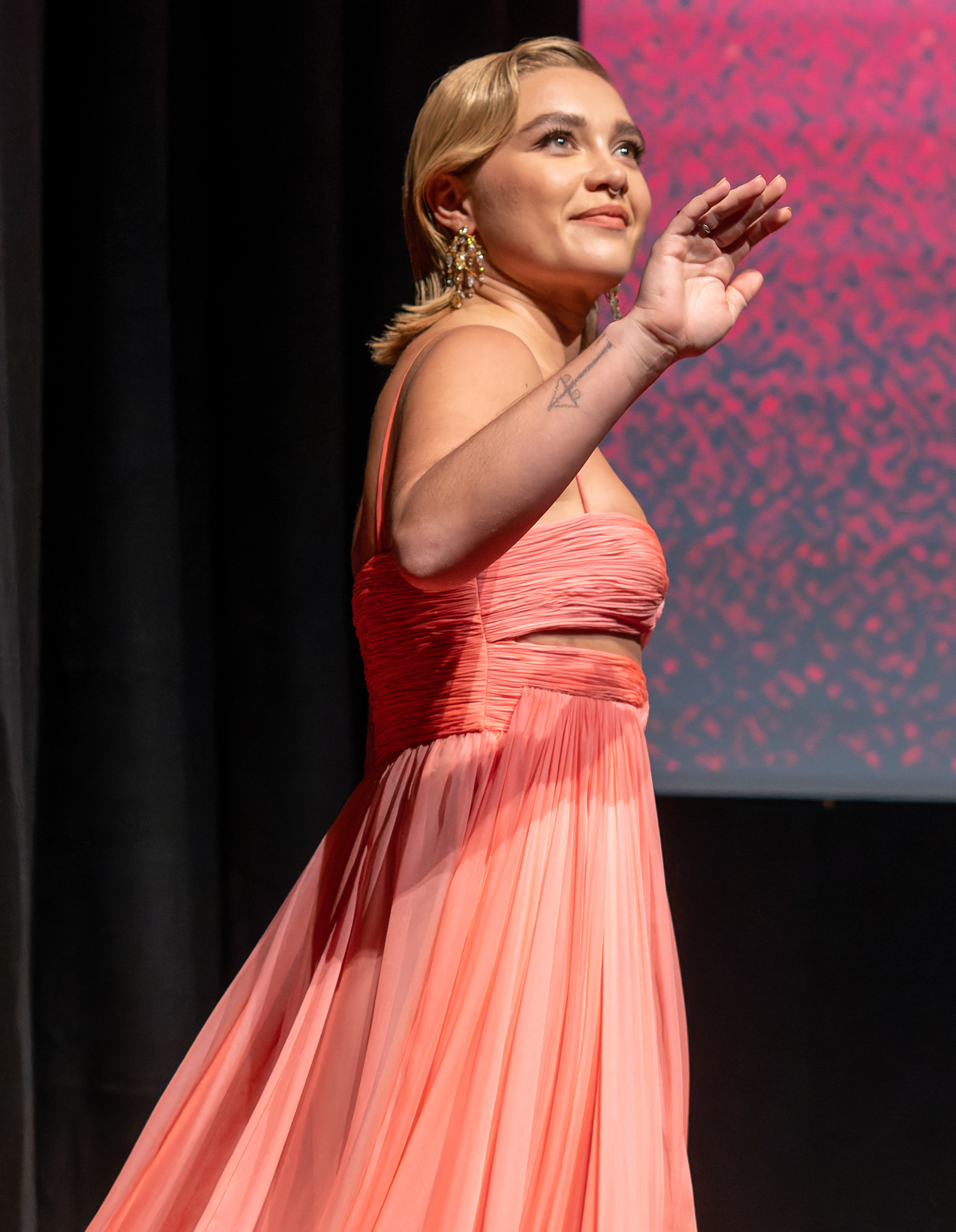
Pugh in 2022

Pugh is known for her fashion sense, with publications such as Harper's Bazaar and British Vogue calling her fashion choices "bold", "daring" and "unique". At a Valentino show in 2022, she wore a sheer pink gown, which led to some backlash as it showed her nipples. Commenting on the reception, she defended her choice and her body on Instagram. A year later, she wore another transparent gown to a Valentino event.

Journalists have often noted Pugh's outspokenness when using social media to address issues such as body shaming, cyberbullying, and beauty standards. British Vogue's Raven Smith reported that her sincerity, interest in others, and humility distinguish her from more guarded actors, whereas Andrea Cuttler of Harper's Bazaar said that her open off-screen persona has come to be expected due to establishing "a career playing women who refuse to be silenced". Annie Lourd of The Independent credits Pugh with "carving out a niche playing difficult characters you know you should hate, but, for whatever reason, end up rooting for". Pugh has said that she gravitates towards roles that terrify or challenge her, and observed that "all of my movies have that element of women being forced into a corner, forced into an opinion, forced into a way of life ... And then finally, something cracks".

In a 2022 readers' poll by Empire magazine, she was voted one of the 50 greatest actors of all time. Terming her "one of the very best of her generation", the magazine attributed her success to bringing "a grounded empathy to her characters". Pugh was included on the entertainment category of Forbes magazine's annual 30 Under 30 list, which recognises the 30 most influential people in Europe under the age of 30, in 2019. Time magazine placed her on the artists category of its 100 Next list, which highlights rising stars and emerging leaders in their fields, in 2021. In 2023, the magazine featured her in their Next Generation Leaders list.

== Personal life and other work ==
From 2019 to 2022, Pugh was in a relationship with American actor and filmmaker Zach Braff. They met while working on the short film In the Time It Takes to Get There, which Braff directed, and lived together in Los Angeles. She defended the 21-year age-gap between them after public scrutiny. She dated photographer Charlie Gooch in 2023. She has been in a relationship with British actor Finn Cole since 2024.

From 2013 to 2016, she performed cover songs on YouTube under the name Flossie Rose. She was featured on her brother's song "Midnight", released on 15 May 2021. In 2020, she took part in the series Acting for a Cause for a live reading of Kenneth Lonergan's play This Is Our Youth to raise funds for the Entertainment Industry Foundation during the COVID-19 pandemic.

In 2024, Pugh revealed that she has polyendocrine metabolic ovarian syndrome and endometriosis, two conditions that can make conceiving children difficult later in life, and had frozen her eggs as a result.

Speaking at the Together for Palestine fundraising event in London in September 2025, she said, "Silence in the face of such suffering is not neutrality; it is complicity in a crime." She urged attendees to call on governments to respond to the situation in Gaza. Pugh has also signed a petition calling on the British government to end its "complicity in the horrors in Gaza".

== Filmography ==
=== Film ===
Year	Title	Role	Notes	Ref.
2014	The Falling	Abigail "Abbie" Mortimer		
2015	Paradise Lost?	Eve	Short film	
2016	Lady Macbeth	Katherine Lester		
2018	The Commuter	Gwen		
2018	Outlaw King	Elizabeth de Burgh		
2018	Malevolent	Angela Sayers		
2018	Leading Lady Parts	Herself	Short film	
2019	Fighting with My Family	Saraya "Paige" Knight		
2019	In the Time It Takes to Get There	Lucille	Short film	
2019	Midsommar	Dani Ardor		
2019	Little Women	Amy March		
2020	Father of the Bride Part 3(ish)	Megan Banks	Short film	
2021	Black Widow	Yelena Belova / Black Widow		
2022	Don't Worry Darling	Alice Warren-Chambers		
2022	The Wonder	Elizabeth "Lib" Wright		
2022	Puss in Boots: The Last Wish	Goldilocks	Voice	
2023	A Good Person	Allison	Also producer	
2023	Oppenheimer	Jean Tatlock		
2023	The Boy and the Heron	Kiriko	Voice; English dub	
2024	Dune: Part Two	Princess Irulan		
2024	We Live in Time	Almut Brühl		
2025	Thunderbolts*	Yelena Belova / Black Widow		
2026	Spider-Man: Brand New Day	Yelena Belova / Black Widow		
2026	Avengers: Doomsday †	Yelena Belova / Black Widow	Post-production	
2026	Dune: Part Three †	Princess Irulan	Post-production	
TBA	42.6 Years †	Young Ruthie	Filming	

Key
†	Denotes films that have not yet been released

=== Television ===
Year	Title	Role	Notes	Ref.
2015	Studio City	Cat	Unaired pilot	
2016	Marcella	Cara Thomas	3 episodes	
2018	King Lear	Cordelia	Television film	
2018	The Little Drummer Girl	Charmian "Charlie" Ross	6 episodes	
2020	Acting for a Cause	Jessica Goldman	Episode: "This Is Our Youth"	
2021–2022	Marvel Studios: Assembled	Herself	2 episodes	
2021	Hawkeye	Yelena Belova / Black Widow	3 episodes	
2022	Running Wild with Bear Grylls	Herself	Episode: "Florence Pugh"	
2023	Human Resources	Sarah Crumbhorn	Voice; 4 episodes	
2025	No Taste Like Home with Antoni Porowski	Herself	Episode: "Florence Pugh's English Odyssey"	
2025	Marvel Zombies	Yelena Belova / Black Widow	Voice; 2 episodes	
2026	East of Eden	Catherine "Cathy" Ames	7 episodes; also executive producer	

=== Music videos ===
Title	Year	Main artist	Ref.
"Midnight ft. Florence Pugh"	2023	Toby Sebastian	
"Never Need Me"	2024	Rachel Chinouriri	
"Zombie"	2025	Yungblud	

== Discography ==
=== Single ===
List of singles, with year released and album name shown
Title	Year	Album
"Midnight" (Toby Sebastian featuring Florence Pugh)	2021	Non-album single

=== Soundtrack ===
Year	Song	Film	Ref.
2023	"The Best Part"	A Good Person	
2023	"I Hate Myself"	A Good Person	

== Accolades ==
Pugh has been nominated for an Academy Award and two British Academy Film Awards. She received an Academy Award nomination for Best Supporting Actress and a BAFTA Award nomination for Best Actress in a Supporting Role, both for her work in Little Women, as well as a BAFTA Rising Star Award nomination. Her performances in Lady Macbeth and The Wonder respectively earned her a British Independent Film Award win and another nomination. At the 2019 Cannes Film Festival, Pugh was awarded the Trophée Chopard. As part of the ensemble of Christopher Nolan's Oppenheimer, Pugh won the Screen Actors Guild Award for Outstanding Performance by a Cast in a Motion Picture.
