= Blue Stockings (play) =

2013 play exploring feminist issues in England in the late 19th Century

Blue Stockings is the first full-length play by Jessica Swale. It is set at Girton College, Cambridge in 1896. Its title refers to bluestockings, a derogatory term for female intellectuals. The action involves four very talented female undergraduates and the campaign to be allowed like their male colleagues to receive a formal degree qualification at the end of their studies. The play touches on some of the issues surrounding the feminist ideals of the late nineteenth-century New Woman including female bicycle-riding, equal education rights, sexual autonomy, and political enfranchisement.

The play was developed during 2012 at the National Theatre Studio and the Royal Academy of Dramatic Arts. Its first full production ran at Shakespeare's Globe from 24 August to 11 October 2013.

The printed play includes a dedication to female education activist and Nobel laureate, Malala Yousafzai.

== Characters ==
The Girton Girls

- Tess Moffat, a curious girl
- Carolyn Addison, an early bohemian
- Celia Willbond, a fragile hard-worker
- Maeve Sullivan, a scholarship student; a mystery

The Boys

- Ralph Mayhew, undergraduate at Trinity College
- Lloyd, undergraduate at Trinity College
- Holmes, undergraduate at Trinity College
- Edwards, undergraduate at Trinity College
- Will Bennett, undergraduate at King's College; Tess's friend

The Staff

- Mrs Elizabeth Welsh, head of Girton College
- Miss Blake, lecturer in moral science at Girton College
- Mr Thomas Banks, lecturer at Trinity and Girton Colleges
- Dr Henry Maudsley, renowned psychiatrist
- Minnie, a maid
- Mr Peck, the groundskeeper
- Miss Bott, the ladies' chaperone
- Radleigh, a board member Trinity College
- Anderson, lecturer at Trinity College
- Collins, lecturer at Trinity College

Others

- Billy Sullivan, Maeve's brother
- Mrs Lindley, shopkeeper in the haberdashery
- The Librarian
- A Lady in a Café
- Husband (of the lady in the café)
- Waiter in the Café

In performance, with the exception of Elizabeth Welsh and Tess, all parts can be doubled. The play can be staged with approximately twelve actors.

== Synopsis ==
=== Prologue ===
It is 1896. Dr Maudlsey begins with a warning to the audience that education for women is a dangerous idea. He argues that women's lives should be determined by their biological and reproductive functions, and therefore, they should not enter into an intellectual race with men at university. Simultaneously, Mrs Elizabeth Welsh, head of Girton College, Cambridge welcomes the new female students to the college for commencement.

=== Act One ===
Tess Moffat arrives to an exterior Cambridge location wearing bloomers without a skirt. She meets her fellow Girton students who are similarly attired: Maeve, Celia and Carolyn. Maeve is from a working-class family but because of her extraordinary talent, and sponsorship from Lady Beaumont, she is able to attend the college. Carolyn is an early bohemian, well-travelled and wealthy. Celia is a cautious student concerned with being a positive representation of Girton College. They have been assembled for Mr Banks's special lecture on the laws of motion otherwise known as learning to ride a bicycle. Banks encourages debate and challenge from them. Tess rides off. In another exterior location, the Trinity boys are watching Tess riding the bicycle from afar. Ralph is especially taken with the sight of a woman sitting astride, whilst Holmes and Lloyd are horrified at the impropriety. Will Bennett (whom we learn later is from Tess's town and has been asked by her father to look out for her) is careful to express no opinion.

Miss Blake teaches the female students moral science. The question is on the nature of happiness: is it self-knowledge, self-abnegation, or self-determination? Miss Blake encourages them to work hard, to be exceptional, to think for themselves, all in aid of advancing the cause of women's rights to graduate. The boys assemble to hear a lecture by the eminent physician, Dr Maudsley. The arrival of the women causes a stir. Dr Maudsley arrives to lecture about female hysteria, his own opinion being that women have inferior moral strength caused by a weaker mind and will. As he lectures he repeatedly ignores the female students until Tess can bear no more and challenges him. Maudsley takes this as evidence of female hysteria and demands that she leave the lecture. She rushes out into the street. Whilst her female colleagues are sympathetic, Holmes and Lloyd are furious with Tess for interrupting the lecture. Will Bennet learns of Tess's trouble and the other boys realise that Will knows Tess. Later, in Mrs Welsh's office, Tess is persuaded to be more diplomatic for the sake of the progress of the female right to graduate. In the library, Ralph sends a secret invitation to Tess to meet him later in the orchard. Tess evades her chaperone, Miss Bott to attend the rendezvous. In his seduction routine, Ralph recites in Italian an excerpt from the sonnet, Provedi, saggio, ad esta visïone by Dante da Maiano which he does not understand. Tess is, nevertheless, taken with him. He kisses her hand and they agree to meet again.

Having been turned away from yet another lecture, and having insisted that science is superior to the arts, Miss Blake threatens not to teach the women anymore. However, an impassioned response by Maeve changes Miss Blake's mind. Maeve's brother, Billy arrives at the college. He insists on taking Maeve home. Their mother has died, and the younger siblings need a woman to care for them. Maeve does not want to give up her education or her promise of a future as a teacher. However, Mrs Welsh, fearing that Maeve's story would be ammunition for those who claim that women's education threatens family life, tells Maeve that she must leave Girton. Maeve is crushed. Miss Blake challenges Mrs Welsh about her decision, but she counters by warning Miss Blake not to promote suffrage in the college.

The injustice of Maeve's situation inspires Tess to write a new essay on a scientific explanation for the Star of Bethlehem. Mr Banks recommends Tess's essay to the boys who could learn from its originality and passion. Mrs Welsh address the Cambridge Senate to appeal for a vote on the issue of granting degrees to women. This action is shown simultaneously with Maeve leaving Girton.

=== Act Two ===
January 1897. Professors Radleigh, Anderson and Collins offer Mr Banks tenure at Trinity College on the understanding that he desists teaching the women at Girton. Carolyn has returned from Christmas in Paris and has taught Tess and Celia to can-can. Will Bennett gives Tess the gift of a telescope and admits his love for her. Tess explains that she loves Ralph. Tess sneaks out again to meet Ralph on a hilltop. Whilst out star-gazing they kiss. Carolyn is caught by Mrs Welsh with suffragist literature obtained from Miss Blake. Mrs Welsh issues an ultimatum to Miss Blake. She must give up politics or give up her life at Girton. Celia challenges Tess for putting Ralph above her studies. Tess is insulted and accuses Celia of not understanding love. Carolyn and Tess buy fabric at Mrs Lindley's haberdashery to make banners to promote degrees for women. Lloyd unleashes a tirade against the women, telling them that Britain was built by men, by male leaders and innovators, and that women have no right to go to university. He accuses them of being unnatural women. Mrs Lindley refuses Lloyd's custom but when he points out that his father is the shop landlord she capitulates and sells him a pair of blue stockings.

Miss Blake meets with Mr Banks. Miss Blake has left her job and is engaged with gaining support from the suffragist movement on the vote for degrees for women. Mr Banks has also lost his job and now his wife will not look at him. They are accosted by a lady in the café who tell them they should be ashamed to be supporting this cause. Will seeks out Ralph in the junior common room at Trinity. They embroil him in brandy-drinking and card games. He learns that Ralph is to marry – but not to marry Tess. He cannot marry a girl from an institution associated with the radical politics of graduation rights as it would scandalise his family. Will breaks this news to Tess. She is distraught. She confesses to Celia how foolish she has been. She and Celia reconcile.

Tess faces her viva examination, but due to spending time with Ralph, she is not as informed as she should be. Carolyn and Celia pass their examinations, but Tess fails. Mrs Welsh allows her to go away for summer and then to return to repeat the year having learned through experience.

The day of the vote arrives. An angry mob, perhaps led by Lloyd, has made an effigy of a blue stocking woman and burned it. They smash the windows at Girton. The mob breaks in to the room led by Lloyd. Will stands up for the women. Lloyd punches him out. Mrs Welsh, loses her composure and rushes at Lloyd. He throws her to the ground. Mr Peck arrives with news that the vote went against them. They will not be granted the right to graduate with a degree. Holmes, whilst disagreeing with degrees for women, grants the women a grudging respect. Tess promises to persevere with her education and with the struggle.

Tess is leaving on a train for the summer. Will once again tells Tess that he loves her. Tess tells him she cannot love yet, but she may in the future. They agree to meet again in September.

== Reception ==
The play garnered mostly positive reviews. Michael Billington of The Guardian wrote, "the lack of nuance, however, matters less than Swale's ability to capture both the intellectual excitement of being part of a new student generation and the dilemmas it produced." Charles Spencer of The Telegraph wrote, "Jessica Swale tells the story with both wit and a hint of righteous indignation – and the final reveal of the date when women finally were awarded degrees at Cambridge took me completely by surprise." Swale earned an Evening Standard Most Promising Playwright nomination in 2013 for her work on the play. In 2015, Blue Stockings entered the GCSE drama syllabus for which Lois Jeary and the playwright produced a students' guide to studying and staging the play.
