= Sam Wanamaker Playhouse =

Indoor theatre in Southwark, London, England

Coordinates: 51°30′29″N 0°05′48″W

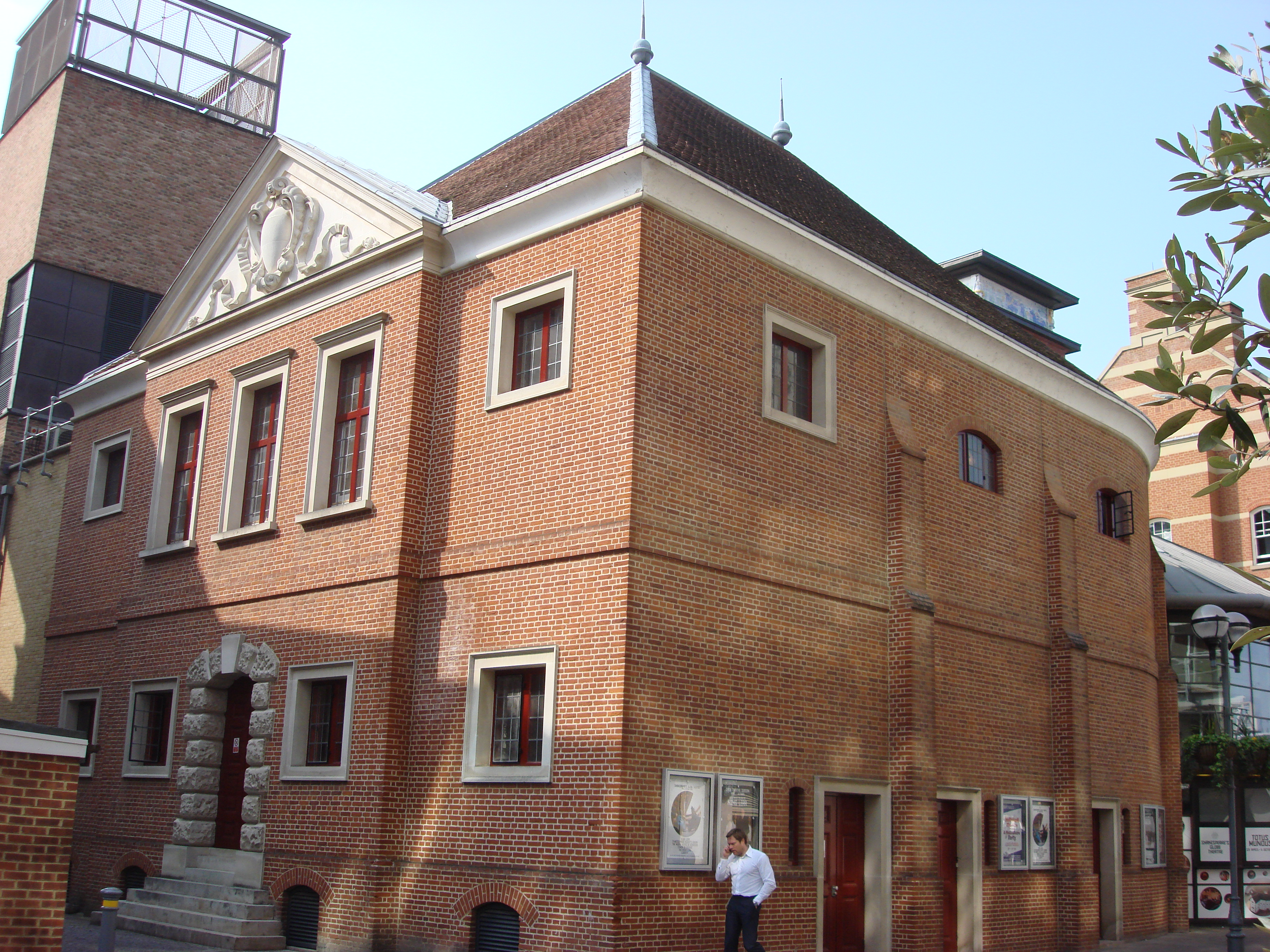
- The Sam Wanamaker Playhouse, the Globe's replica Jacobean theatre
- Interactive map of Sam Wanamaker Playhouse
- Location: Southwark; London, SE1; United Kingdom
- Owner: The Shakespeare Globe Trust
- Capacity: 340
- Public transit: London Bridge

Construction
- Opened: 2014; 12 years ago
- Architects: Pentagram (shell); Jon Greenfield, in collaboration with Allies and Morrison

Website
- ShakespearesGlobe.com

The Sam Wanamaker Playhouse is an indoor theatre forming part of the Shakespeare's Globe complex, along with the recreated Globe Theatre on Bankside in Southwark, London. Built by making use of 17th-century plans for an indoor English theatre, the playhouse recalls the layout and style of the Blackfriars Theatre (which also existed in Shakespeare's time), although it is not an exact reconstruction. Unlike the Globe, the original Blackfriars was not in Southwark but rather across the river.

The shell of the playhouse was built during the construction of the Globe complex in the 1990s. The smaller unfinished building was used as a space for education workshops and rehearsals until enough money was raised to complete its true-to-the-period interior. It opened for public performances in January 2014, named after actor Sam Wanamaker, the leading figure in the Globe's reconstruction.

== History ==
The shell was intended to house a simulacrum of the sixteenth-century Blackfriars Theatre from the opposite side of the Thames, adapted as a playhouse in 1596 during Elizabeth's reign. The Lord Chamberlain's Men, Shakespeare's playing company, began to use it in 1608, five years into the Jacobean era.

As no reliable plans of the Blackfriars Theatre are known, the plan for the new theatre was based on drawings found in the 1960s at Worcester College, Oxford, at first thought to date from the early 17th century, and to be the work of Inigo Jones. The shell was built to accommodate a theatre as specified by the drawings, and the planned name was the Inigo Jones Theatre. In 2005, the drawings were dated to 1660 and attributed to John Webb. They nevertheless represent the earliest known plan for an English theatre, and are thought to approximate the layout of the Blackfriars Theatre. Some features believed to be typical of earlier in the 17th century were added to the new theatre's design.

The shell was initially used as a rehearsal space, and for education projects. On 24 February 2012 it was announced that the new theatre would be named the Sam Wanamaker Theatre, after the founder of the Shakespeare Globe Trust, and work on it would commence in October that year. It was also announced that the total cost would be £7 million, and that an anonymous donor had pledged £1 for every £1 the theatre itself raised, up to a maximum of £3 million.

The theatre was completed at a cost of £7.5 million. Designed by Jon Greenfield, in collaboration with Allies and Morrison, it is an oak structure built inside the building's brick shell. The thrust stage is surmounted by a musicians' gallery, and the theatre has an ornately painted ceiling. The seating capacity is 340, with benches in a pit and two horse-shoe galleries, placing the audience close to the actors. Shutters around the first gallery admit artificial daylight. When the shutters are closed, lighting is provided by beeswax candles mounted in sconces, as well as on six height-adjustable chandeliers and even held by the actors. The design incorporated extensive fire precautions.

Under the slightly revised name of the Sam Wanamaker Playhouse, the theatre's opening two productions were of plays first performed at the original Blackfriars Theatre: The Duchess of Malfi opened on 15 January 2014 and this was followed by the comedy The Knight of the Burning Pestle. In the winter 2015–16 season Shakespeare's four late tragicomic plays – Pericles, Cymbeline, The Winter's Tale and The Tempest – were staged.
