= Sense and Sensibility (disambiguation) =

Sense and Sensibility is a novel by Jane Austen.

Sense and Sensibility may also refer to:

== Film ==
- Sense and Sensibility (1995 film), by Ang Lee
  - Sense and Sensibility (1995 soundtrack)
- Sense and Sensibility (2024 film), a Hallmark channel television film
- Sense and Sensibility (2026 film), a film by Georgia Oakley
  - Sense and Sensibility (2026 soundtrack)

== Television ==
- Sense and Sensibility (1971 TV series), BBC television adaptation
- Sense and Sensibility (1981 TV series), by Rodney Bennett
- Sense and Sensibility (2008 TV series), by John Alexander

== See also ==
- Sense and Sensibility and Sea Monsters (2009), a parody novel by Ben H. Winters
- "Sense and Senility" (1987), the fourth episode of the BBC sitcom Blackadder the Third
- Sense and Sensibilia (disambiguation)
- Accolades received by Sense and Sensibility (disambiguation)
