= Great Bridge =

Great Bridge may refer to:

England:

- Great Barford Bridge, spanning the River Great Ouse at Great Barford, Bedfordshire
- Great Bridge, West Midlands, an area of Sandwell, West Midlands
- Great Bridge, the former name of Magdalene Bridge, Cambridge

United States:

- Great Bridge (Cambridge), a bridge across the Charles River in Cambridge, Massachusetts
- Great Bridge, Virginia, a community in Chesapeake, Virginia
  - Battle of Great Bridge, Revolutionary War battle in Virginia
  - Great Bridge Bridge, drawbridge over the Atlantic Intracoastal Waterway
- Great River Bridge, an asymmetrical, one-tower cable-stayed bridge over the Mississippi River between Iowa and Illinois
- Great Stone Bridge, or Stone Arch Bridge (Minneapolis)

Elsewhere:

- Great Belt Bridge, part of the Great Belt Fixed Link, connecting the Danish islands of Zealand and Funen
- Great Bridge, former bridge in Zrenjanin built in 1904 demolished in 1969.
- Great Seto Bridge, a series of double deck bridges connecting Okayama and Kagawa prefectures in Japan across a series of five small islands in the Seto Inland Sea

Miscellaneous:

- The Great Bridge (book), by David McCullough
