= 53rd Golden Globe Awards =

Film award ceremony in 1996

- Date: January 21, 1996
- Site: The Beverly Hilton, Beverly Hills, California

Highlights
- Best Film: Drama: Sense and Sensibility
- Best Film: Musical or Comedy: Babe
- Best Drama Series: Party of Five
- Best Musical or Comedy Series: Cybill
- Most awards: Cybill (2); Indictment: The McMartin Trial (2); Sense and Sensibility (2)
- Most nominations: Sense and Sensibility (6)

Television coverage
- Network: NBC

The 53rd Golden Globe Awards, honoring the best in film and television for 1995, were held on January 21, 1996 at The Beverly Hilton and were televised on NBC in the United States. The nominations were announced on December 21, 1995.

== Winners and nominees ==
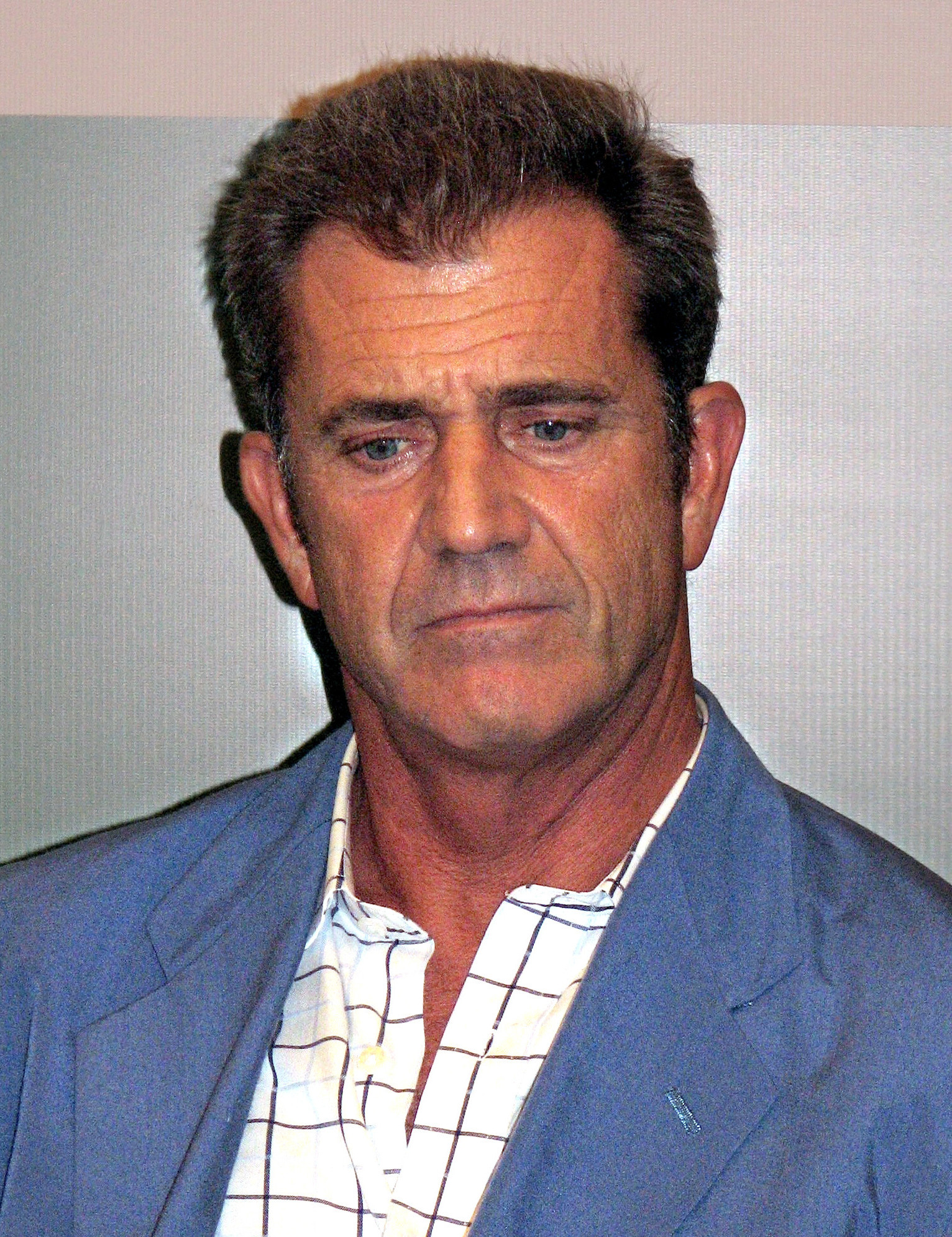
Mel Gibson – Best Director winner

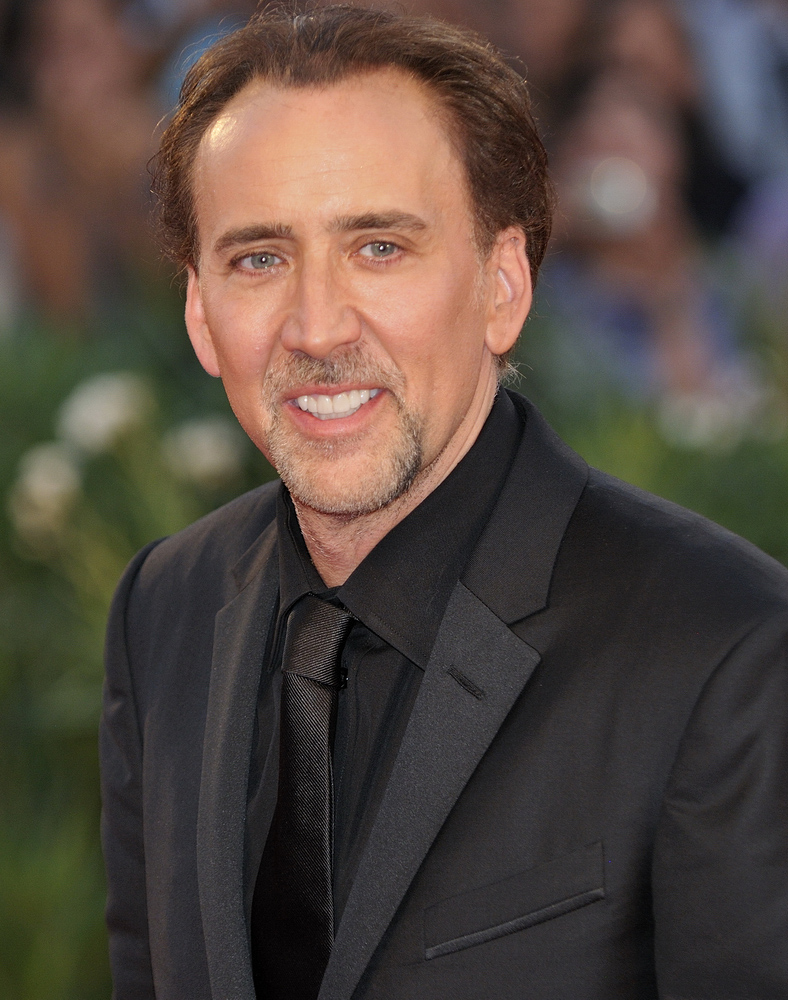
Nicolas Cage – Best Actor in a Motion Picture, Drama winner

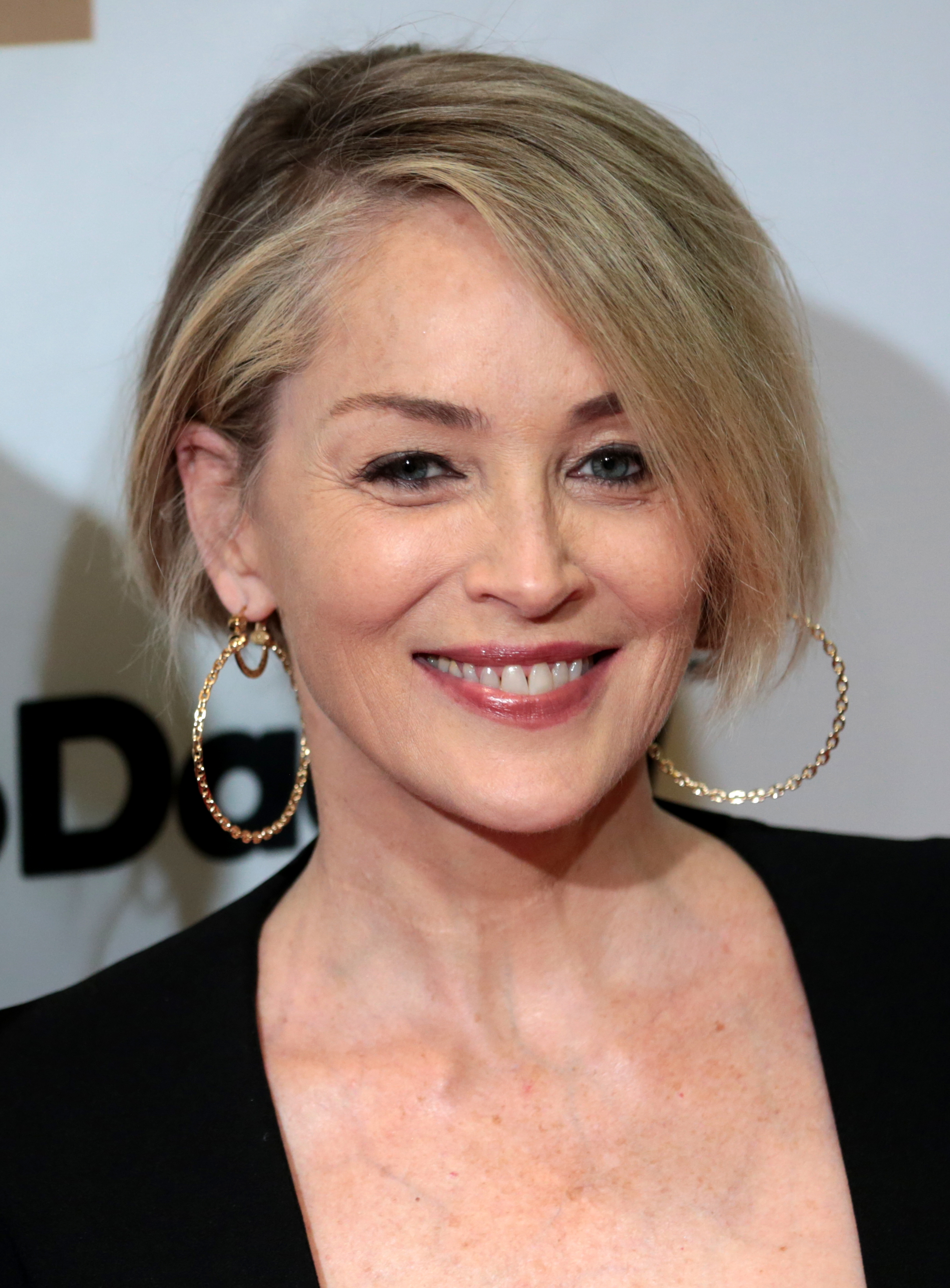
Sharon Stone – Best Actress in a Motion Picture, Drama winner

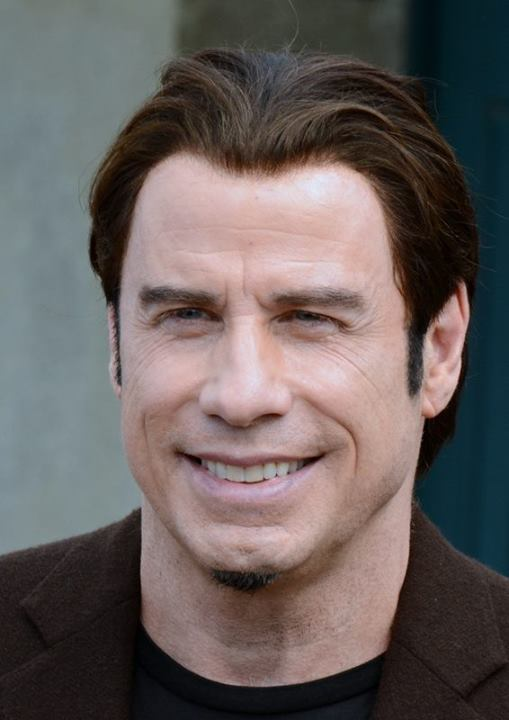
John Travolta – Best Actor in a Motion Picture, Musical or Comedy winner

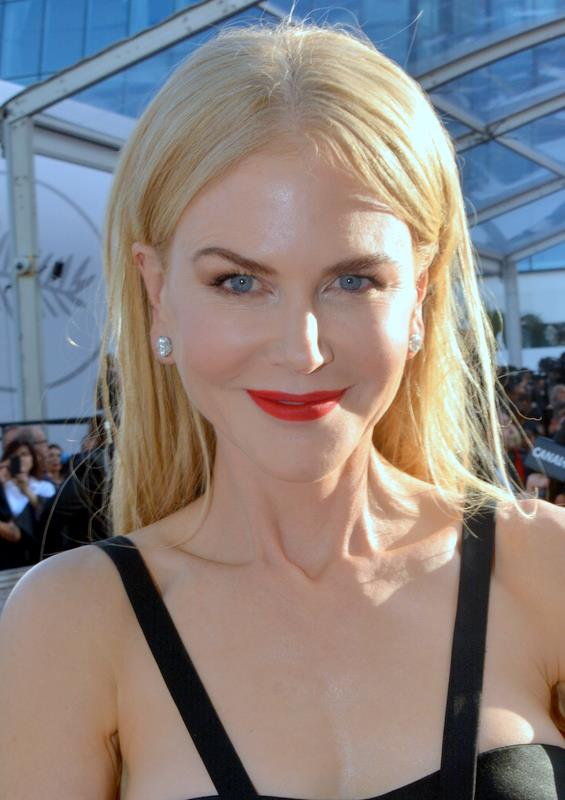
Nicole Kidman – Best Actress in a Motion Picture, Musical or Comedy winner

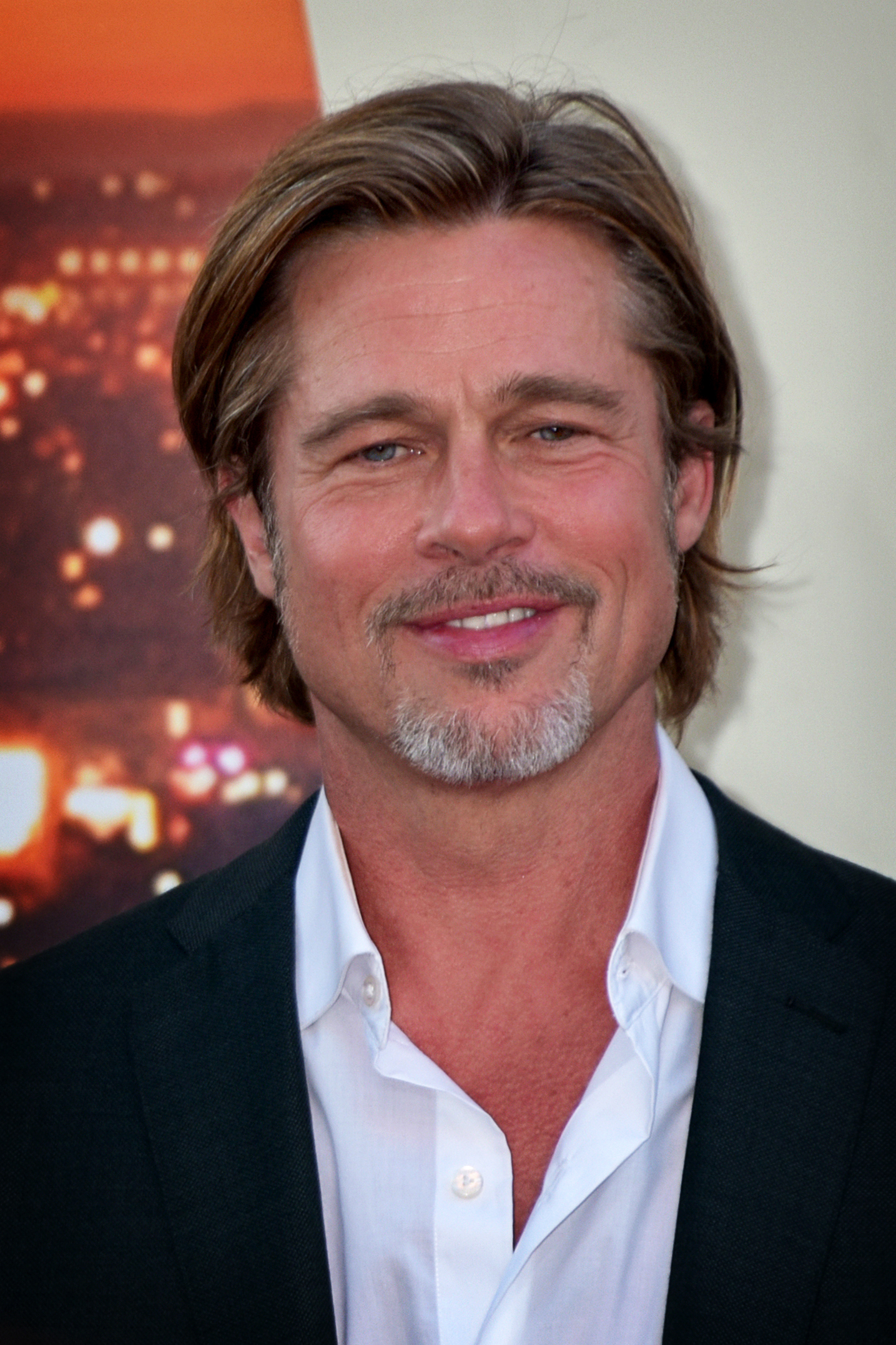
Brad Pitt – Best Supporting Actor in a Motion Picture winner

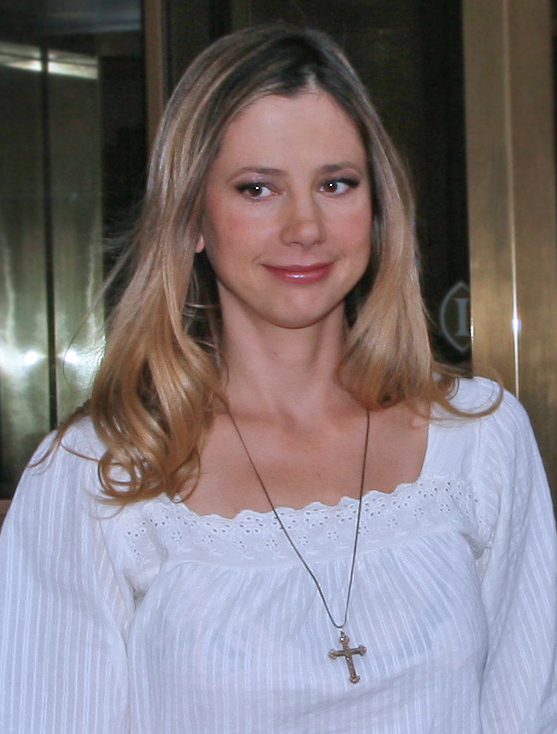
Mira Sorvino – Best Supporting Actress in a Motion Picture winner

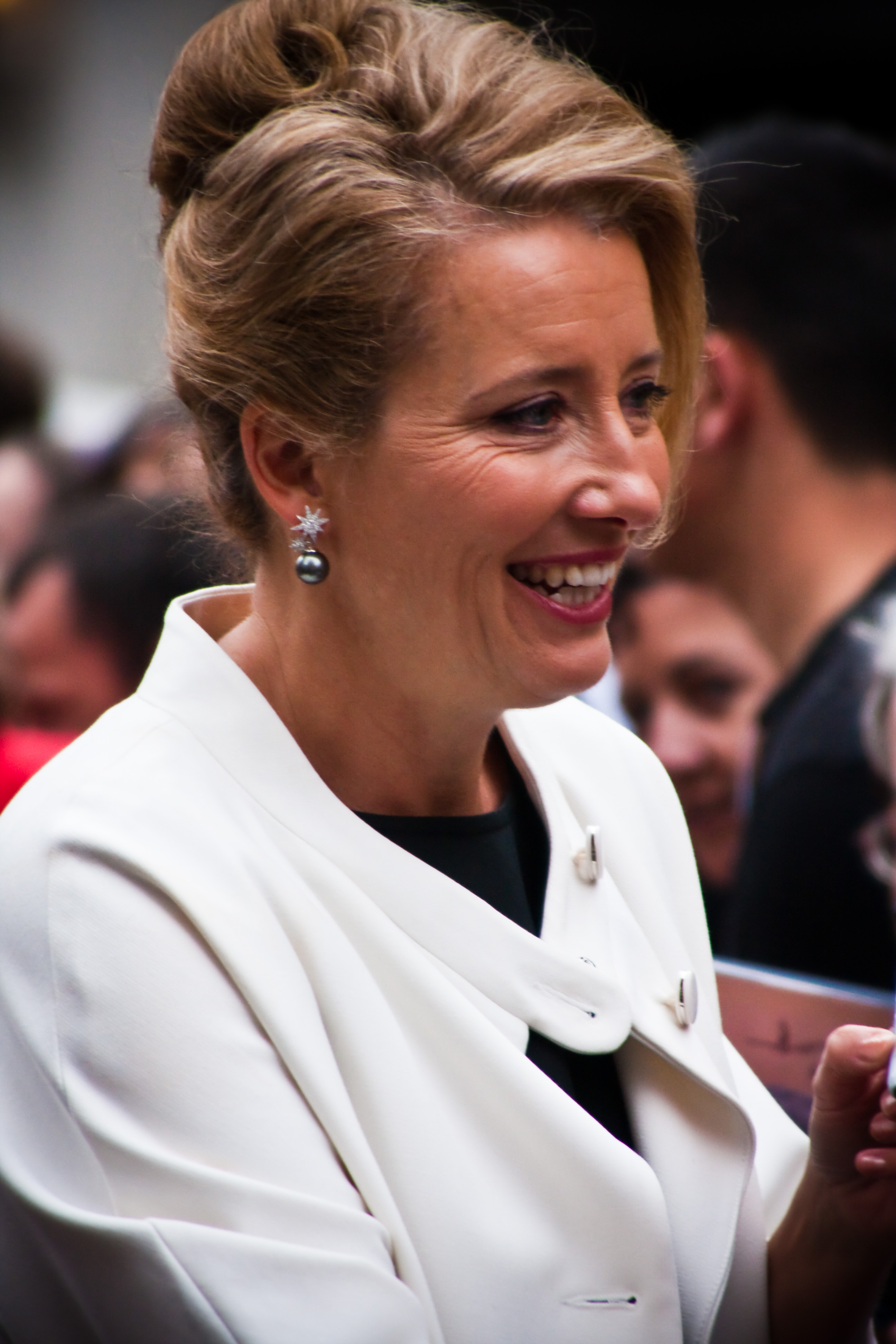
Emma Thompson – Best Screenplay winner

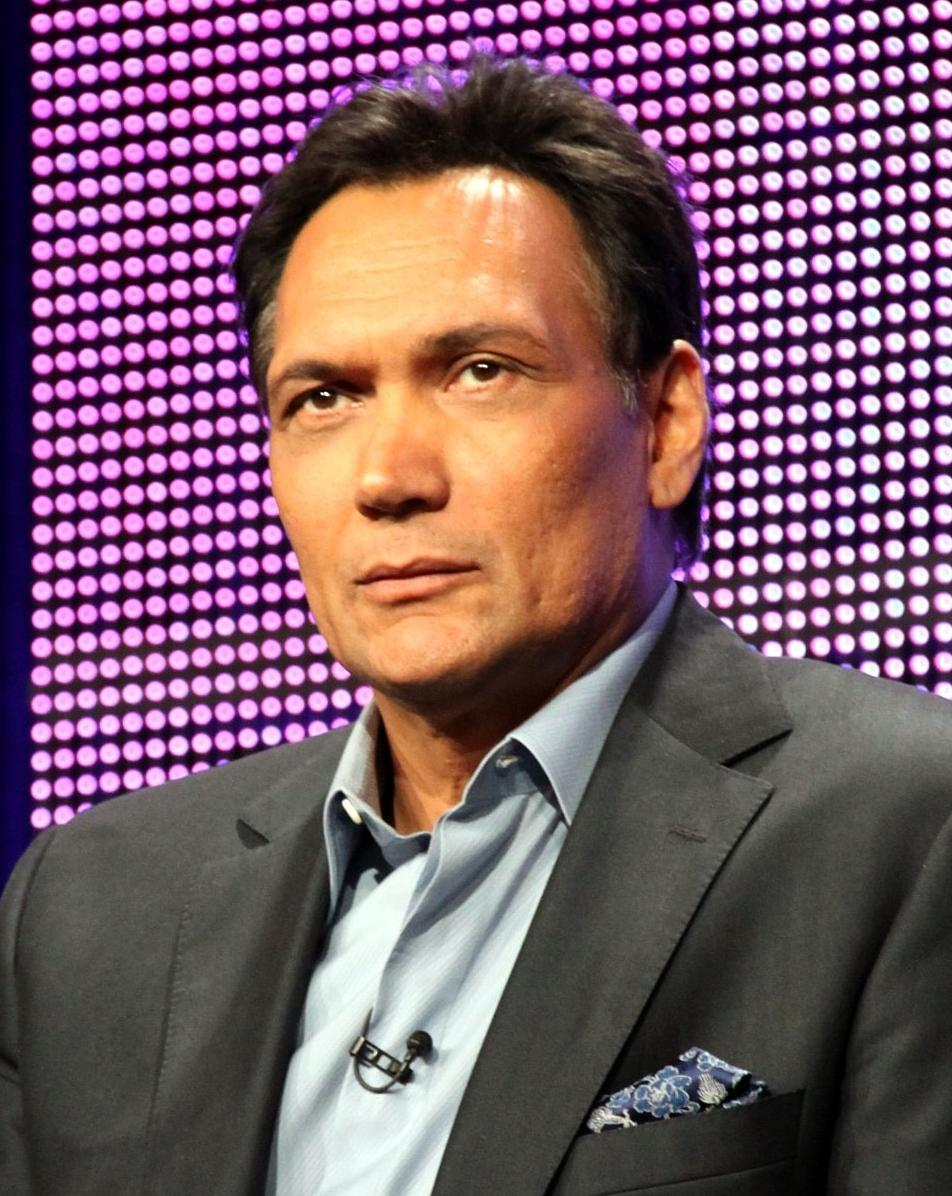
Jimmy Smits – Best Actor in a Television Series, Drama winner

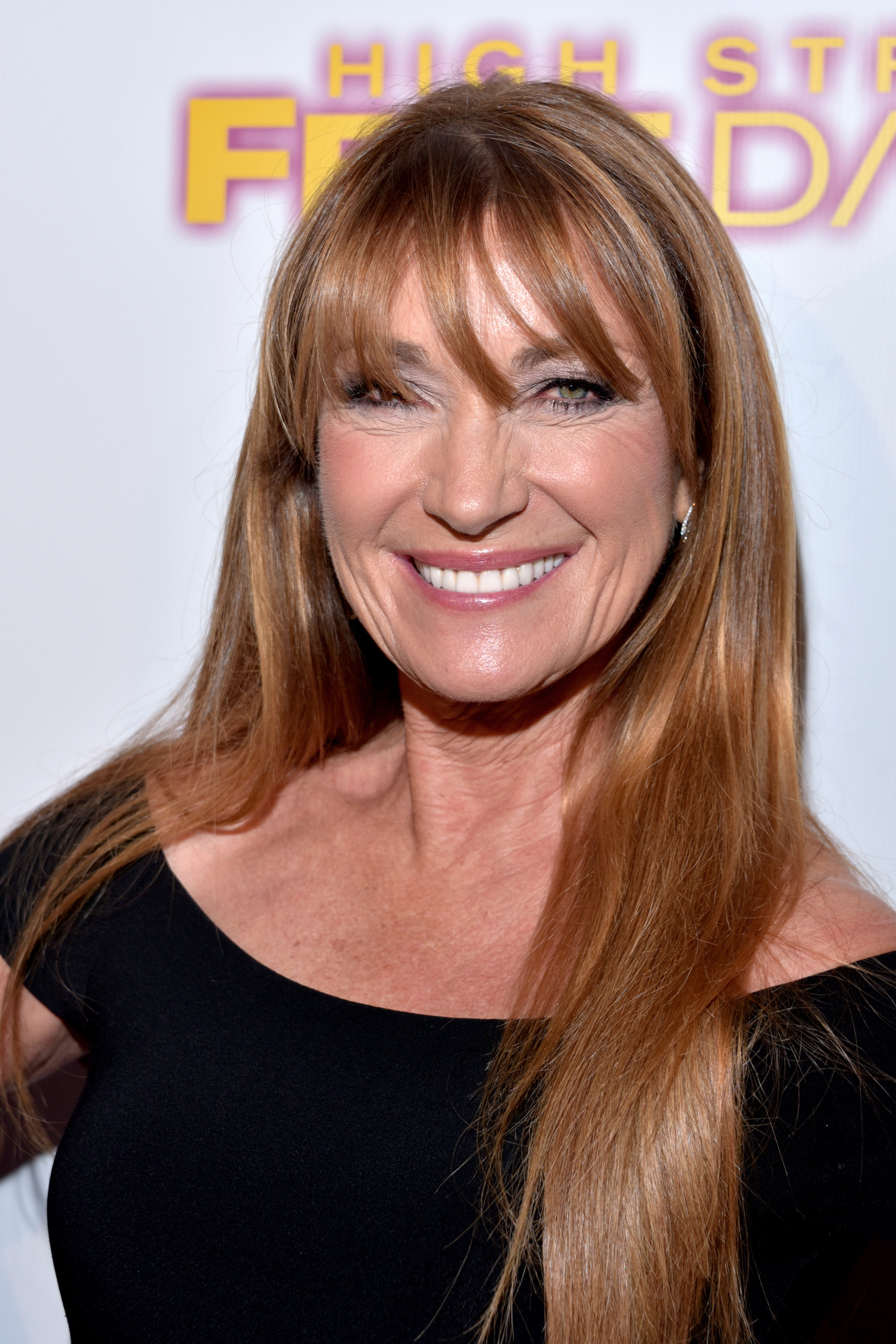
Jane Seymour – Best Actress in a Television Series, Drama winner

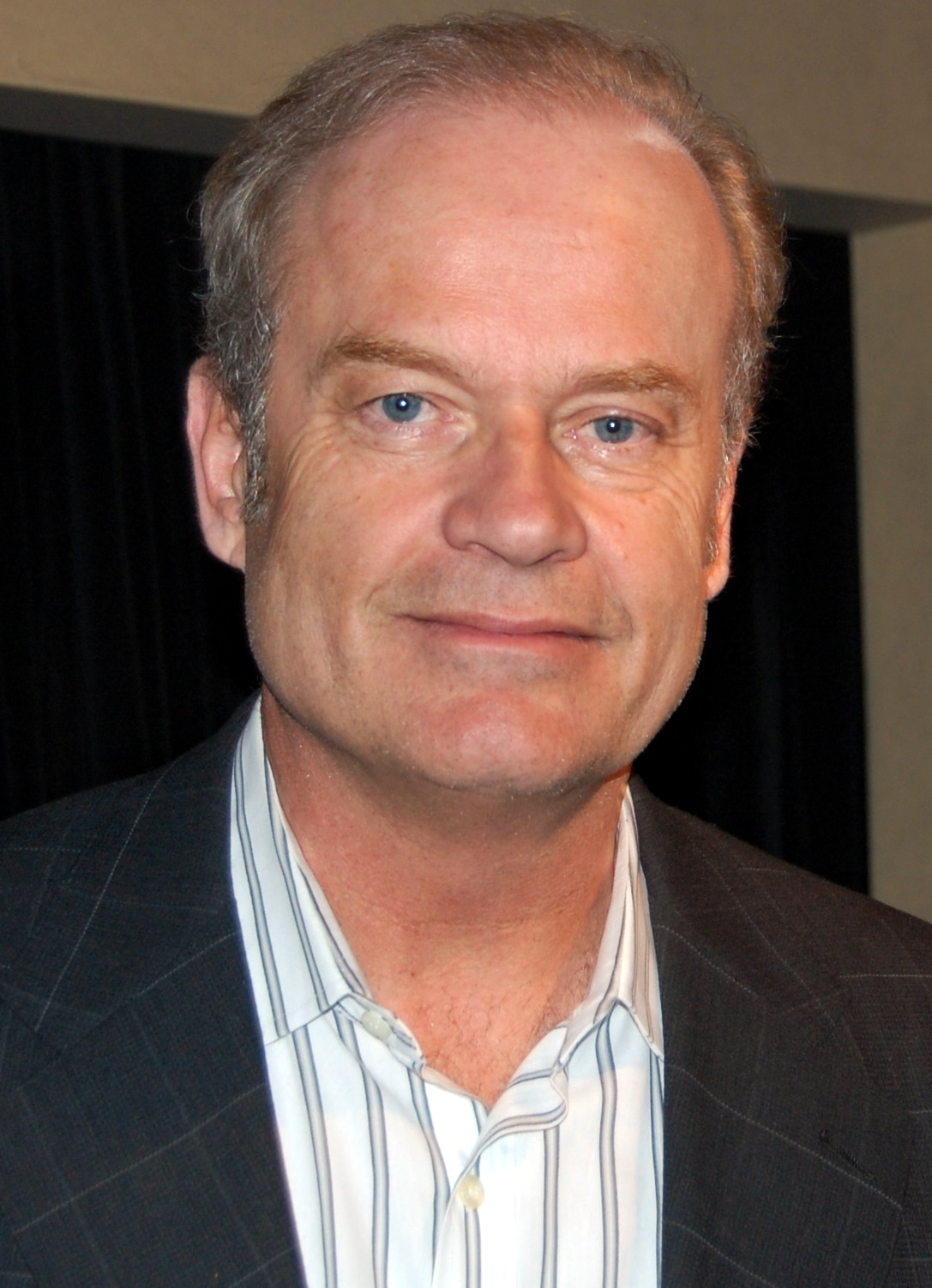
Kelsey Grammer – Best Actor in a Television Series, Musical or Comedy winner

Cybill Shepherd – Best Actress in a Television Series, Musical or Comedy winner

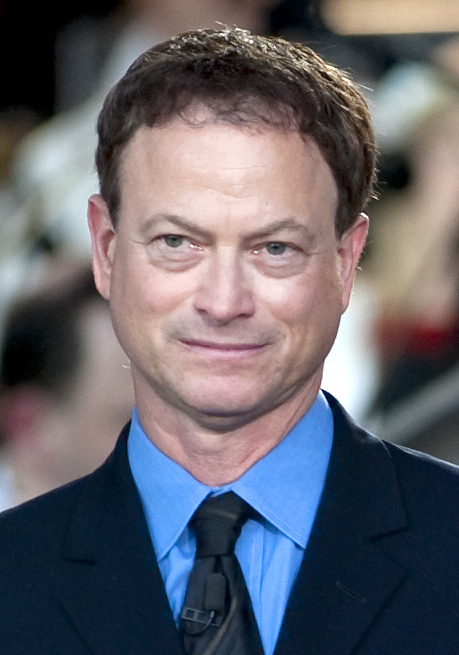
Gary Sinise – Best Actor in a Miniseries or Television Film winner

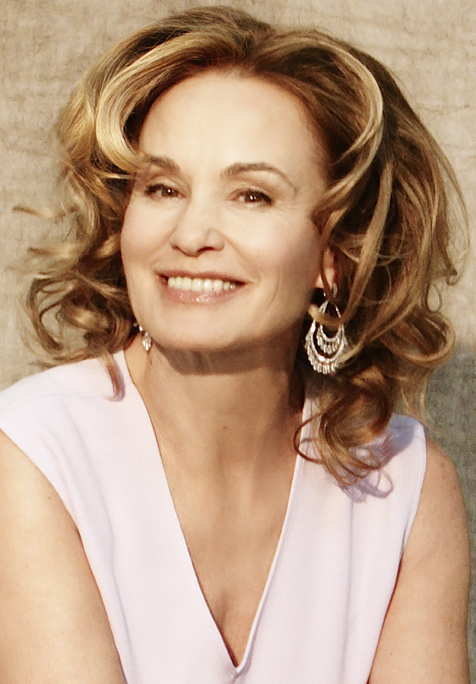
Jessica Lange – Best Actress in a Miniseries or Television Film winner

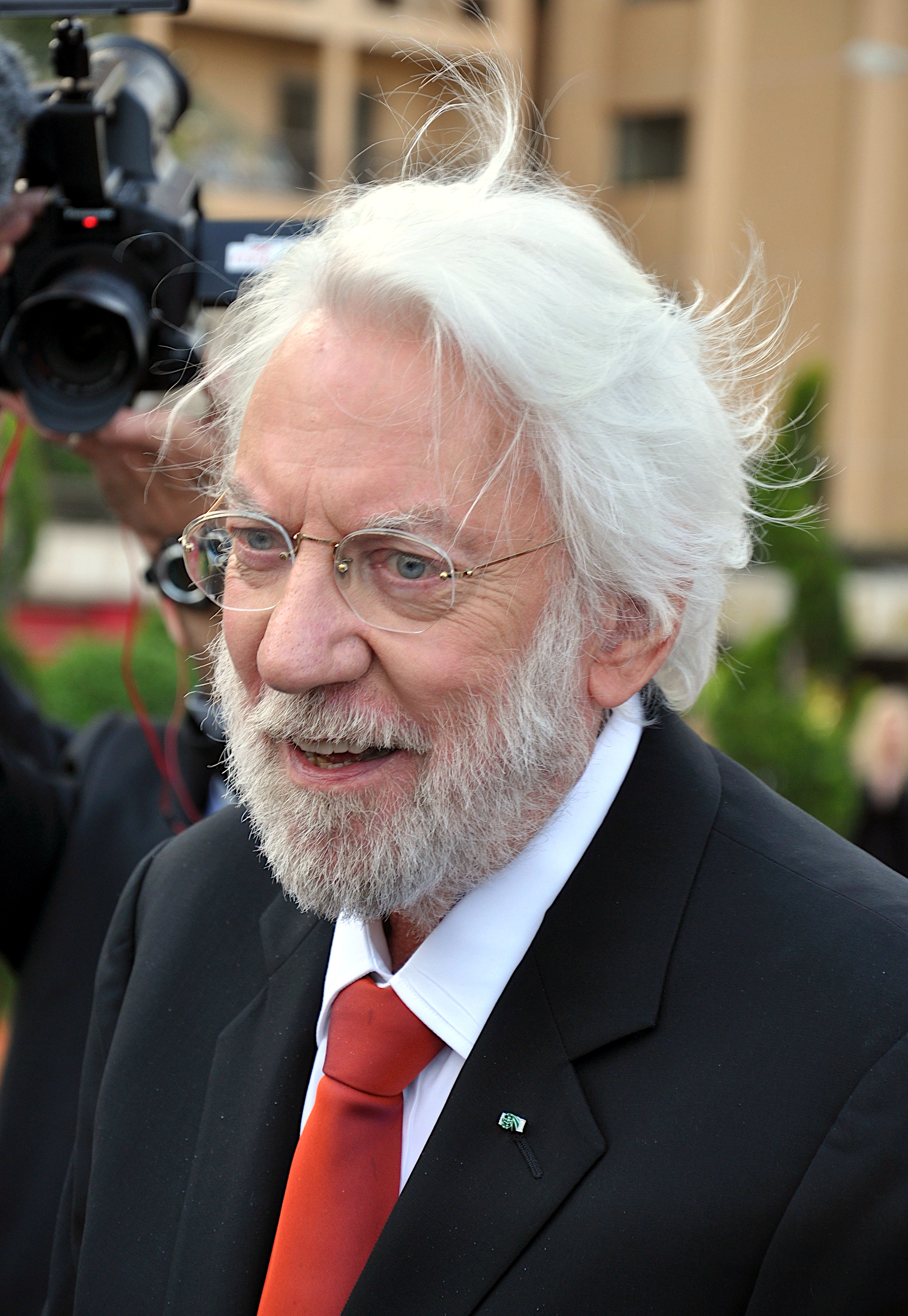
Donald Sutherland – Best Supporting Actor in a Series, Miniseries, or Television Film winner

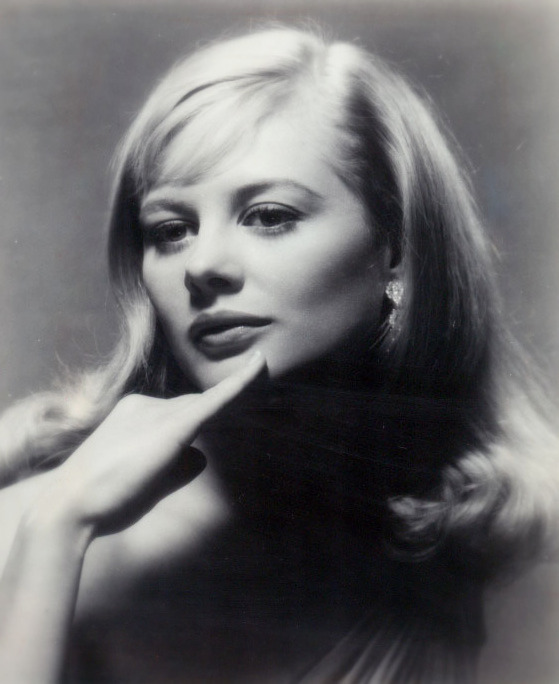
Shirley Knight – Best Supporting Actress in a Series, Miniseries, or Television Film winner

=== Film ===
Best Motion Picture
Drama	Musical or Comedy
Sense and Sensibility: Apollo 13; Braveheart; The Bridges of Madison County; Leaving Las Vegas	Babe: The American President; Get Shorty; Sabrina; Toy Story
Best Performance in a Motion Picture – Drama
Actor	Actress
Nicolas Cage – Leaving Las Vegas as Ben Sanderson: Richard Dreyfuss – Mr. Holland's Opus as Glenn Holland; Anthony Hopkins – Nixon as Richard Nixon; Ian McKellen – Richard III as Richard III of England; Sean Penn – Dead Man Walking as Matthew Poncelet	Sharon Stone – Casino as Ginger McKenna: Susan Sarandon – Dead Man Walking as Sister Helen Prejean; Elisabeth Shue – Leaving Las Vegas as Sera; Meryl Streep – The Bridges of Madison County as Francesca Johnson; Emma Thompson – Sense and Sensibility as Elinor Dashwood
Best Performance in a Motion Picture – Musical or Comedy
Actor	Actress
John Travolta – Get Shorty as Ernesto "Chili" Palmer: Michael Douglas – The American President as President Andrew "Andy" Shepard; Harrison Ford – Sabrina as Linus Larrabee; Steve Martin – Father of the Bride Part II as George Banks; Patrick Swayze – To Wong Foo, Thanks for Everything! Julie Newmar as Vida Boheme	Nicole Kidman – To Die For as Suzanne Stone-Marretto: Annette Bening – The American President as Sydney Ellen Wade; Sandra Bullock – While You Were Sleeping as Lucy Moderatz; Toni Collette – Muriel's Wedding as Muriel Heslop; Vanessa Redgrave – A Month by the Lake as Miss Bentley
Best Supporting Performance in a Motion Picture – Drama, Musical or Comedy
Supporting Actor	Supporting Actress
Brad Pitt – 12 Monkeys as Jeffrey Goines: Ed Harris – Apollo 13 as Gene Kranz; John Leguizamo – To Wong Foo, Thanks for Everything! Julie Newmar as Chi-Chi Rodriguez; Tim Roth – Rob Roy as Archibald Cunningham; Kevin Spacey – The Usual Suspects as Roger "Verbal" Kint / Keyser Söze	Mira Sorvino – Mighty Aphrodite as Leslie "Linda" Ash: Anjelica Huston – The Crossing Guard as Mary; Kathleen Quinlan – Apollo 13 as Marilyn Lovell; Kyra Sedgwick – Something to Talk About as Emma Rae King; Kate Winslet – Sense and Sensibility as Marianne Dashwood
Best Director	Best Screenplay
Mel Gibson – Braveheart: Mike Figgis – Leaving Las Vegas; Ron Howard – Apollo 13; Ang Lee – Sense and Sensibility; Rob Reiner – The American President; Martin Scorsese – Casino	Sense and Sensibility – Emma Thompson: The American President – Aaron Sorkin; Braveheart – Randall Wallace; Dead Man Walking – Tim Robbins; Get Shorty – Scott Frank; Mr. Holland's Opus – Patrick Sheane Duncan
Best Original Score	Best Original Song
A Walk in the Clouds – Maurice Jarre: Braveheart – James Horner; Don Juan DeMarco – Michael Kamen; Pocahontas – Alan Menken; Sense and Sensibility – Patrick Doyle	"Colors of the Wind" by Alan Menken (music) and Stephen Schwartz (lyrics) – Pocahontas: "Have You Ever Really Loved a Woman?" by Michael Kamen, Bryan Adams, and Robert John Lange – Don Juan DeMarco; "Hold Me, Thrill Me, Kiss Me, Kill Me" by Adam Clayton (music), The Edge (music), Larry Mullen Jr. (music), and Bono (lyrics) – Batman Forever; "Moonlight" by John Williams (music), Alan Bergman (lyrics), and Marilyn Bergman (lyrics) – Sabrina; "You've Got a Friend in Me" by Randy Newman – Toy Story
Best Foreign Language Film	
Les Misérables • France: Brother of Sleep (Schlafes Bruder) • Germany; French Twist (Gazon maudit) • France; Like Two Crocodiles (Come due coccodrilli) • Italy; Shanghai Triad (Yao a yao yao dao waipo qiao) • China	

The following films received multiple nominations:

Nominations	Title
6	Sense and Sensibility
5	The American President
4	Apollo 13
4	Braveheart
4	Leaving Las Vegas
3	Dead Man Walking
3	Get Shorty
3	Sabrina
2	The Bridges of Madison County
2	Casino
2	Don Juan DeMarco
2	Mr. Holland's Opus
2	Pocahontas
2	To Wong Foo, Thanks for Everything! Julie Newmar
2	Toy Story

The following films received multiple wins:

Wins	Film
2	Sense and Sensibility

=== Television ===
Best Television Series
Drama	Comedy or Musical
Party of Five: Chicago Hope; ER; Murder One; NYPD Blue	Cybill: Frasier; Friends; Mad About You; Seinfeld
Best Lead Actor in a Television Series
Drama Series	Comedy or Musical Series
Jimmy Smits – NYPD Blue: Daniel Benzali – Murder One; George Clooney – ER; David Duchovny – The X-Files; Anthony Edwards – ER	Kelsey Grammer – Frasier: Tim Allen – Home Improvement; Paul Reiser – Mad About You; Jerry Seinfeld – Seinfeld; Garry Shandling – The Larry Sanders Show
Best Lead Actress in a Television Series
Drama Series	Comedy or Musical Series
Jane Seymour – Dr. Quinn, Medicine Woman: Gillian Anderson – The X-Files; Kathy Baker – Picket Fences; Heather Locklear – Melrose Place; Sherry Stringfield – ER	Cybill Shepherd – Cybill: Candice Bergen – Murphy Brown; Ellen DeGeneres – Ellen; Fran Drescher – The Nanny; Helen Hunt – Mad About You
Best Supporting Performance – Series, Miniseries, or Television Film
Best Supporting Actor – Series, Miniseries, or Television Film	Best Supporting Actress – Series, Miniseries, or Television Film
Donald Sutherland – Citizen X: Sam Elliott – Buffalo Girls; Tom Hulce – The Heidi Chronicles; David Hyde Pierce – Frasier; Henry Thomas – Indictment: The McMartin Trial	Shirley Knight – Indictment: The McMartin Trial: Christine Baranski – Cybill; Judy Davis – Serving in Silence: The Margarethe Cammermeyer Story; Melanie Griffith – Buffalo Girls; Lisa Kudrow – Friends; Julianna Margulies – ER
Best Actor – Miniseries or Television Film	Best Actress – Miniseries or Television Film
Gary Sinise – Truman: Alec Baldwin – A Streetcar Named Desire; Charles S. Dutton – The Piano Lesson; Laurence Fishburne – The Tuskegee Airmen; James Woods – Indictment: The McMartin Trial	Jessica Lange – A Streetcar Named Desire: Glenn Close – Serving in Silence: The Margarethe Cammermeyer Story; Jamie Lee Curtis – The Heidi Chronicles; Sally Field – A Woman of Independent Means; Linda Hamilton – A Mother's Prayer
Best Miniseries or Television Film	
Indictment: The McMartin Trial: Citizen X; The Heidi Chronicles; Serving in Silence: The Margarethe Cammermeyer Story; Truman	

The following programs received multiple nominations:

Nominations	Title
5	ER
4	Indictment: The McMartin Trial
3	Cybill
3	Frasier
3	The Heidi Chronicles
3	Mad About You
3	Serving in Silence: The Margarethe Cammermeyer Story
2	Buffalo Girls
2	Citizen X
2	Friends
2	Murder One
2	NYPD Blue
2	Seinfeld
2	A Street Car Named Desire
2	Truman
2	The X-Files

The following programs received multiple wins:

Wins	Series
2	Cybill
2	Indictment: The McMartin Trial

== Ceremony ==
=== Presenters ===
- Anne Archer
- Tom Arnold
- Kevin Bacon
- Angela Bassett
- Nicolas Cage
- Michael Crichton
- Jamie Lee Curtis
- David Duchovny
- Laurence Fishburne
- Joely Fisher
- Faith Ford
- Jodie Foster
- Dennis Franz
- Tom Hanks
- Teri Hatcher
- Joanna Kerns
- Eriq La Salle
- Martin Landau
- Angela Lansbury
- Chris O'Donnell
- Edward James Olmos
- David Paymer
- Jane Seymour
- Alicia Silverstone
- Lea Thompson
- John Travolta
- Vanessa Williams

=== Cecil B. DeMille Award ===
- Sean Connery

=== Mr. Golden Globe ===
- Freddie Prinze Jr. (son of Freddie Prinze and Katherine Prinze)

=== Miss Golden Globe ===
- Jaime Dudney (daughter of Barbara Mandrell and Ken Dudney)

== Awards breakdown ==
The following networks received multiple nominations:

Nominations	Network
19	NBC
13	CBS
10	HBO
6	ABC
4	Fox
3	TNT

The following networks received multiple wins:

Wins	Network
2	CBS
2	HBO

== See also ==
- 68th Academy Awards
- 16th Golden Raspberry Awards
- 2nd Screen Actors Guild Awards
- 47th Primetime Emmy Awards
- 48th Primetime Emmy Awards
- 49th British Academy Film Awards
- 50th Tony Awards
- 1995 in film
- 1995 in American television
