= Stacey Pensgen =

American figure skater and meteorologist

Personal information
- Full name: Stacey Elizabeth Pensgen
- Born: May 25, 1982 (age 44) Fairport, New York, U.S.
- Height: 5 ft 3 in (1.59 m)

Figure skating career
- Country: United States
- Began skating: 1988
- Retired: 2004
Medal record
Figure skating: Ladies' singles
Representing the United States
Four Continents Championships
Silver medal – second place	2000 Osaka	Ladies' singles

Stacey Elizabeth Pensgen (born May 25, 1982) is an American former competitive figure skater who won the silver medal at the 2000 Four Continents Championships. She is currently the evening meteorologist for WHEC-TV News10NBC in Rochester, New York.

== Personal life and education ==
Pensgen was born in Fairport, New York. She trained in gymnastics from the age of three until she was fifteen. She was a regional champion in 1994 and 1995.

Pensgen studied at Lahser High School in Bloomfield Hills, Michigan. She later attended Oakland Community College, and the University of Colorado. In 2007, she graduated with a Bachelor of Science degree in meteorology from SUNY Brockport.

She is a fan of the Buffalo Bills National Football League team.

== Skating career ==
Pensgen began skating at the age of six after watching figure skating on television. From 1998, she was coached mainly by Richard Callaghan at the Onyx in Rochester. She was also coached by Mitch Moyer at the Detroit Skating Club in Bloomfield Hills, Michigan. She represented Genesee Figure Skating Club.

Competing in single skating, Pensgen won the bronze medal at the 1999 ISU Junior Grand Prix in Canada and the silver medal at the 2000 Four Continents Championships. Her highest placement at the U.S. Championships was sixth in 2000.

In the 2001–02 season, Pensgen was coached by Callaghan and Sergei Petrovsky in Michigan. In 2003, she trained under Diana Ronayne in Colorado Springs, Colorado.

Pensgen also competed in pair skating. Early in her career, she skated with her brother, Nathan Pensgen. In 2002, she teamed up with Derek Trent and placed 14th at the 2003 U.S. Championships.

=== Programs ===
Season	Short program	Free skating
1999–2000	A Walk in the Clouds by Maurice Jarre	Martin Guerre by Claude-Michel Schönberg; Homeward Bound
2003	Tribute by Yanni	Steam; Kama Sutra

=== Results ===
==== Single skating ====
International
Event	97–98	98–99	99–00	00–01	01–02
Four Continents			2nd		
Golden Spin				4th	
Nebelhorn Trophy				4th	
International: Junior
JGP Canada			3rd		
JGP Sweden			4th		
National
U.S. Champ.	13th	9th	6th	13th	17th

==== Pair skating with Trent ====
National
Event	2002–03
U.S. Championships	14th

== Meteorology and broadcast career ==
=== 13 WHAM TV ===
13 WHAM TV hired Pensgen in August 2006 as a part-time meteorologist and reporter. She quit working at WHAM in January 2011.

=== WROC-TV News 8 ===
Pensgen was hired by WROC-TV News 8 in February 2011. She was the weekend meteorologist for News 8 at 6, and News 8 at 11. She also filled in for former chief meteorologist Scott Hetsko and morning meteorologist John DiPasquale. Pensgen has also done some reporting work for WROC, including "Living Here" segments featuring distinctive small towns in Western New York and "Around Town" segments on weekend events around Rochester, New York. On August 10, 2016, she became the chief meteorologist for WROC-TV News 8 after Scott Hetsko left the station.

=== WHEC Rochester 10 ===
The Rochester D&C announced on July 24, 2019, Pensgen will be moving to WHEC-TV. Pensgen will join the NBC affiliate the week of Aug. 5, according to a press release from the station. She will make her first on-air appearance Aug.12 and anchor forecasts weekdays at 4, 5, 6, 7 and 11 p.m.
