= Truman (1995 film) =

1995 film

- Genre: Biography; Drama
- Based on: Truman by David McCullough
- Written by: Thomas Rickman
- Directed by: Frank Pierson
- Starring: Gary Sinise; Diana Scarwid; Tony Goldwyn; Colm Feore
- Music by: David Mansfield
- Country of origin: United States
- Original language: English

Production
- Executive producers: Anthea Sylbert; Paula Weinstein
- Producer: Doro Bachrach
- Production locations: Independence, Missouri; Kansas City, Missouri; Leavenworth, Kansas; Lee's Summit, Missouri; Topeka, Kansas; Weston, Missouri
- Cinematography: Paul Elliott
- Editor: Lisa Fruchtman
- Running time: 135 minutes
- Production companies: HBO Pictures; Spring Creek Productions
- Budget: $8 million

Original release
- Network: HBO
- Release: September 9, 1995

Truman is a 1995 American biographical drama television film directed by Frank Pierson and written by Thomas Rickman, based on David McCullough's Pulitzer Prize-winning 1992 book, Truman. Starring Gary Sinise as Harry S. Truman, the film centers on Truman's humble beginnings, his rise to the presidency, World War II, and his decision to use the first atomic bomb. The film aired on HBO on September 9, 1995.

== Cast ==
- Gary Sinise as Harry S. Truman
- Diana Scarwid as Bess Truman
- Richard Dysart as Henry L. Stimson
- Colm Feore as Charlie Ross
- James Gammon as Sam Rayburn
- Tony Goldwyn as Clark Clifford
- Pat Hingle as Boss Tom Pendergast
- Harris Yulin as General George C. Marshall
- Leo Burmester as Frank Vassar
- Amelia Campbell as Margaret Truman
- Virginia Capers as Elizabeth Moore
- John Finn as Bob Hannegan
- Željko Ivanek as Eddie Jacobson
- David Lansbury as Lieutenant Jim Pendergast
- Remak Ramsay as Dean Acheson
- Marian Seldes as Eleanor Roosevelt
- Lois Smith as Madge Wallace Gates
- Richard Venture as J. Lester Perry
- Daniel von Bargen as General Douglas MacArthur
- Michael Murphy as Dinner Speaker (uncredited)

== Reception ==
On Rotten Tomatoes, the film has an 89% rating based on reviews from 9 critics. Steve Crum of the Dispatch-Tribune Newspapers rated it 5 out of 5, calling it a "Superb production with memorable Sinise performance in title role." TV Guide said, "Over-applauded by many critics, Truman is sturdy, standardized biographical moviemaking elevated by incontestably brilliant acting. Unfortunately, this cavalcade of facts and figures is conceived and executed impersonally like a docent delivering a speech in front of the waxworks at a Presidential museum. … [The audience lacks] a sense that Truman's travails have been shaped on screen by a filmmaker's passion. … Truman offers the satisfaction of textual thoroughness and seamless storytelling, but few flashes of inspiration or imagination."

=== Accolades ===
Year	Award	Category	Nominee(s)	Result	Ref.
1996	American Cinema Editors Awards	Best Edited Motion Picture for Non-Commercial Television	Lisa Fruchtman	Nominated	
1996	American Society of Cinematographers Awards	Outstanding Achievement in Cinematography in Movie of the Week or Pilot	Paul Elliott	Won	
1996	Artios Awards	Outstanding Achievement in Movie of the Week Casting	Mary Colquhoun	Won	
1996	CableACE Awards	Movie or Miniseries		Won	
1996	CableACE Awards	Actor in a Movie or Miniseries	Gary Sinise	Won	
1996	Directors Guild of America Awards	Outstanding Directorial Achievement in Dramatic Specials	Frank Pierson	Nominated	
1996	Golden Globe Awards	Best Miniseries or Motion Picture Made for Television		Nominated	
1996	Golden Globe Awards	Best Actor in a Miniseries or Motion Picture Made for Television	Gary Sinise	Won	
1996	Golden Reel Awards	Best Sound Editing – Television Movies of the Week – Sound Effects & Foley	Brady Schwartz and Jeffrey Kaplan	Nominated	
1996	Primetime Emmy Awards	Outstanding Made for Television Movie	Paula Weinstein, Anthea Sylbert, and Doro Bachrach	Won	
1996	Primetime Emmy Awards	Outstanding Lead Actor in a Miniseries or a Special	Gary Sinise	Nominated	
1996	Primetime Emmy Awards	Outstanding Supporting Actress in a Miniseries or a Special	Diana Scarwid	Nominated	
1996	Primetime Emmy Awards	Outstanding Writing for a Miniseries or a Special	Thomas Rickman	Nominated	
1996	Primetime Emmy Awards	Outstanding Casting for a Miniseries or a Special	Mary Colquhoun	Won (Note: Tied with Robi Reed-Humes for The Tuskegee Airmen.)	
1996	Primetime Emmy Awards	Outstanding Editing for a Miniseries or a Special – Single Camera Production	Lisa Fruchtman	Nominated	
1996	Primetime Emmy Awards	Outstanding Makeup for a Miniseries or a Special	Ashlee Petersen, Gordon J. Smith, Russell Cate, Evan Penny, Joe Ventura, Raymond Mackintosh, Heidi Seeholzer, Louise Mackintosh, and Benjamin Robin	Nominated	
1996	Primetime Emmy Awards	Outstanding Sound Mixing for a Drama Miniseries or a Special	Reinhard Stergar, Wayne Heitman, James Bolt, and Joel Fein	Nominated	
1996	Producers Guild of America Awards	Outstanding Producer of Long-Form Television	Paula Weinstein, Anthea Sylbert, and Doro Bachrach	Won	
1996	Screen Actors Guild Awards	Outstanding Performance by a Male Actor in a Television Movie or Miniseries	Gary Sinise	Won	

== See also ==
- List of Primetime Emmy Awards received by HBO
