= Sensibile =

Sensibile (pl. Sensibilia) may refer to:

- Leading tone, in music
- Sense and Sensibilia (disambiguation)

== See also ==
- Sense data
