= Truman (book) =

1992 book by David McCullough

- First edition
- Author: David McCullough
- Language: English
- Subject: History/U.S. History
- Published: June 15, 1992; Simon & Schuster
- Publication place: United States
- Pages: 1120 pages
- ISBN: 0-671-86920-5 (paperback); 0-671-45654-7 (hardcover)
- Preceded by: Brave Companions
- Followed by: John Adams

Truman is a 1992 biography of the 33rd president of the United States, Harry S. Truman, by the American historian David McCullough. It won the 1993 Pulitzer Prize for Biography or Autobiography and was made into a 1995 television film by HBO.

== Plot summary ==
The book provides a biography of Truman in chronological fashion from his birth to his rise to U.S. senator, vice president, and president. It follows his activities until death, exploring many of the major decisions he made as president, including his decision to drop the atom bomb on Hiroshima and Nagasaki, his meetings and confrontation with Joseph Stalin during the end of World War II, his decision to create the Marshall Plan, his decision to send troops to the Korean War, his decision to recognize the State of Israel, and his decision to racially desegregate the U.S. Armed Forces.

== Production ==
"Writing history or biography, you must remember that nothing was ever on a track. Things could have gone any way at any point. As soon as you say 'was,' it seems to fix an event in the past. But nobody ever lived in the past, only in the present. The difference is that it was their present. They were just as alive and full of ambition, fear, hope, all the emotions of life. And just like us, they didn't know how it would all turn out. The challenge is to get the reader beyond thinking that things had to be the way they turned out and to see the range of possibilities of how it could have been otherwise."
- David McCullough

After writing Mornings on Horseback, which was his first biography and consisted of an in-depth look at a small period in the life of U.S. President Theodore Roosevelt, McCullough wanted to do a more full biography, "a mural instead of a Vermeer." At first, McCullough attempted to write a biography about Pablo Picasso, but abandoned the project in favor of doing a book on Truman.

McCullough decided that he would structure the story of Truman's biography in chronological fashion. He explained his reasoning: "It's been very fashionable lately to begin biographies anywhere but at the beginning, heaven forbid. But I didn't want to do anything tricky or fashionable because [Truman] was neither of those things. Harry Truman was a 19th-century man and I decided I would proceed as a great 19th-century biographer would, or as Dickens would."

In effort to better understand his subject, McCullough took several actions to emulate the life and activities of Truman. For instance, he would begin each day with a brisk early-morning walk, just as Harry S. Truman did. He also lived in Truman's hometown, Independence, Missouri, for a little while. He also raced through the United States Capitol retracing the path Truman ran when he was summoned to the White House after the death of Franklin D. Roosevelt.

In his research for the book, McCullough interviewed hundreds of people who knew Truman, including relatives and U.S. Secret Service agents, read numerous letters and documents, and read almost all the books written about Truman.

While working on the book McCullough would read every draft page aloud to his wife and have her read the pages back to him. McCullough explained this practice by stating: "You can hear things that you cannot see. Redundancies, awkward expressions. Painters often look at their work in the mirror because you can see flaws that you don't see looking straight at a canvas."

McCullough wrote Truman over a period of 10 years. He stated that during that 10 years many things changed in his life, "In those 10 years, my youngest daughter changed from a girl into a woman, both my parents died, grandchildren were born, we moved our residence twice, we put a child through college and law school, and paid off a mortgage."

McCullough felt a compulsion to get the book finished before the 1992 presidential election period in response to the shallow political debates that were occurring in Washington, D.C. McCullough said, "I felt that something needed to be said before people made a choice. This book is about the country, not just about Harry Truman. It's about who we are and what we can be."

While McCullough was able to gain insights into Truman based on his research, there were questions that remained unanswered to McCullough, such as why Truman's wife left him alone in Washington so often. The usual explanation among historians was that Bess hated the heat and her mother was ill, but McCullough has expressed doubts about this explanation stating that "[Bess] was away so often and [Truman's] letters to her were so plaintive, his need for her to be there so real. I don't know."

McCullough has stated that he intended Truman to be not only for "the Arthur Schlesingers and the academics" but instead intended the book for "your grandmother," and other common folk including present and future politicians so "they may see, even when flawed, how great a man in [the office of the President] can be."

== Reception ==
External videos
- Organization of American Historians panel on Truman biographies, including Robert Ferrell's Harry S. Truman: A Life, Alonzo Hamby's Man of the People: A Life of Harry S. Truman and David McCullough's Truman.", C-SPAN

After the book was published, McCullough went on a book-tour. One of the largest crowds he encountered was when he went to the Harry S. Truman Presidential Library and Museum in Independence, Missouri.

Most reviewers praised the book when it came out. One notable dissent was an article in The New Republic titled "Harry of Sunnybrook Farm" by Ronald Steel, in which Steel called the book a "1000 page valentine."

Gene Lyons at Entertainment Weekly gave the book an A, stating that "No brief review can begin to do justice either to Truman or to the monumentally persuasive job McCullough has done re-creating his life and times.... Immeasurably aided by Truman's vividly written diaries and letters to his beloved wife, Bess, McCullough brings the man and his times to life with painstaking clarity."

The book won McCullough his first Pulitzer Prize, in the category of "Best Biography or Autobiography".

== Adaptation ==
In 1995, the book was adapted into Truman, a television film by HBO, starring Gary Sinise as Truman.
