= Brave Companions: Portraits in History =

1991 book by David McCullough

- First edition
- Author: David McCullough
- Language: English
- Subject: History
- Publisher: Prentice Hall
- Publication date: 1991
- Publication place: United States
- Media type: Paperback
- ISBN: 0-671-79276-8
- OCLC: 27006373
- Preceded by: Mornings on Horseback
- Followed by: Truman

Brave Companions: Portraits in History is a 1991 book by the American historian David McCullough. The book consists of previously published essays, most of which are biographical portraits of a specific historical figure or group of figures. It is divided into five sections.

== Contents ==
I. Phenomena

"Journey to the Top of the World" is a portrait of German scientist and explorer Alexander von Humboldt, with particular attention paid to the expedition to Latin America he undertook in 1799–1804 with Aimé Bonpland.

"The American Adventure of Louis Agassiz", about the 19th-century scientist and educator Louis Agassiz, focuses on the latter part of his life when he became established in the United States.

"The Unexpected Mrs. Stowe" is a biographical portrait of Harriet Beecher Stowe, the author of the novel Uncle Tom's Cabin.

II. The Real West

"Glory Days in Medora" focuses on the town of Medora, North Dakota and the people who inhabited the area in the 1880s, including Theodore Roosevelt and the Marquis de Mores.

"Remington" is a biographical portrait of the Western artist Frederic Remington.

III. Pioneers

"Steam Road to El Dorado" is about the construction of the original Panama Railway in the 1850s.

"The Builders" concerns the construction of the Brooklyn Bridge in the 1870s, and particularly the life of engineer John A. Roebling and his son, Washington Roebling.

"The Treasure from the Carpentry Shop" concerns the rediscovery of the original plans for the Brooklyn Bridge in 1969.

"Long-Distance Vision" is about the experiences and literary works of several early aviators, including Charles Lindbergh, Antoine de Saint-Exupéry, and Beryl Markham.

IV. Figures in a Landscape

In this section, McCullough profiles individuals he is acquainted with personally.

"Cross the Blue Mountain" is a portrait of American author Conrad Richter.

"The Lonely War of a Good Angry Man", written in 1969, concerns the destructive environmental impact of strip mining in eastern Kentucky, and profiles Harry M. Caudill, local author and anti-strip mining political activist.

"Miriam Rothschild" is about the English zoologist and entomologist Miriam Rothschild.

"South of Kankakee: A Day with David Plowden" is a profile of American photographer David Plowden.

V. On We Go

"Washington on the Potomac" is a personal tribute to the city of Washington, DC, where McCullough lived for many years.

"Extraordinary Times", written in 1986, is a look back at the fifty years of world history since 1936.

"Recommended Itinerary" is an address McCullough gave to the 1986 graduating class of Middlebury College, in which he urged graduates to travel abroad to gain a better appreciation of the United States, and to study history in order to gain a better appreciation of their own time.

"Simon Willard's Clock" is an essay concerning the history of the United States Congress, in which McCullough writes that legislators must have a sense of their own institution's history.
