= The Greater Journey =

2011 book by David McCullough

- Author: David McCullough
- Language: English
- Subject: History
- Genre: Non-fiction
- Published: May 24, 2011; Simon & Schuster
- Publication place: United States
- Pages: 576 pages
- ISBN: 1-4165-7176-0 (hardcover)
- Preceded by: 1776
- Followed by: The Wright Brothers

The Greater Journey: Americans in Paris is a 2011 non-fiction book by the Pulitzer Prize-winning author David McCullough. In a departure from McCullough's previous works, Founding Fathers like Benjamin Franklin and Thomas Jefferson, who spent time in Paris, are not covered. Instead, the book is about 19th-century Americans like James Fenimore Cooper and Samuel Morse, who migrated to Paris and went on to achieve importance in culture or innovation. Other subjects include Elihu Washburne, the American ambassador to France during the Franco-Prussian War, Elizabeth Blackwell, the first female doctor in the United States, Charles Sumner who studied at the Sorbonne and went on to become an American politician, and American artists who worked in Paris such as George Healy, Mary Cassatt, and Augustus Saint-Gaudens.
