= John Adams (book) =

2001 book by David McCullough

John Adams.
- The cover of John Adams.
- Author: David McCullough
- Language: English
- Subject: History, U.S. history, American Revolution
- Genre: Non-fiction
- Published: May 22, 2001; Simon & Schuster
- Publication place: United States
- Pages: 751 pages
- ISBN: 978-1-4165-7588-7 (paperback) 0684813637 (hardcover)
- OCLC: 191069913
- Preceded by: Truman
- Followed by: 1776

John Adams. is a 2001 biography of the Founding Father and second U.S. President John Adams, written by the popular American historian David McCullough, which won the 2002 Pulitzer Prize for Biography or Autobiography and the 2002 Ambassador Book Award for Biography or Autobiography. It was adapted into the 2008 television miniseries of the same name by HBO Films. Since the TV miniseries debuted, an alternative cover has been added to the book showing Paul Giamatti as John Adams. The book is available as both hardcover and paperback.

== Production ==
The problem with Adams is that most Americans know nothing about him.

— David McCullough

Although the book was originally intended to be a dual biography of Adams and Jefferson, McCullough was increasingly drawn to Adams and away from Jefferson. The author spent six years studying Adams, reading the same books he had read and visiting the places he had lived.

Perhaps the greatest treasure trove was the enormous amount of correspondence between John Adams and his wife, Abigail Adams, a marriage McCullough calls "one of the great love stories of American history." Also invaluable was his long correspondence with his successor as president, Thomas Jefferson, which McCullough calls "one of the most extraordinary correspondences in the English language."

== Praise ==
- Walter Isaacson for Time: "America's most beloved biographer, David McCullough, has plucked Adams from the historical haze...and produced another masterwork of storytelling that blends colorful narrative with sweeping insights."
- Booklist: "[A] wonderfully stirring biography; to read it is to feel as if you are witnessing the birth of a country firsthand."
- Library Journal: "This life of Adams is an extraordinary portrait of an extraordinary man....This excellent biography deserves a wide audience."
- Kirkus Reviews: "Despite the whopping length, there's not a wasted word in this superb, swiftly moving narrative, which brings new and overdue honor to a Founding Father."
- The New Yorker: "David McCullough's portrait may not quite give us the battered titan in all his raw, sulfurous asperity, but his vivid storytelling will surely persuade a generation to look again at this obstinate, brave, and most deeply philosophical of American patriarchs."
- Publishers Weekly: "Here a preeminent master of narrative history takes on the most fascinating of our founders to create a benchmark for all Adams biographers."
- Book Reporter: "Lavish and abundant in documentation, readers will be delighted with the fascinating, colorful narrative in John Adams."
- The New York Times: "...a lucid and compelling work."
- The New York Review of Books: "This big but extremely readable book is by far the best biography of Adams ever written."

== Criticism ==
- The New Republic: "McCullough barely mentions Adams's political writings; and what he has to say about the two major works consists of brief quotations surrounded by utterly conventional plot summary and commentary."
- Claremont Institute: "Oddly, McCullough has almost nothing to say about Adams's political thought."

== Awards ==
- Ambassador Book Award/English-Speaking Union of the US (2002)
- American Academy of Diplomacy Award (2001)
- American Revolution Round Table Book Award (2001)
- Christopher Award
- The Colonial Dames of America Award (2002)
- Comm. of Mass. Board of Library Commissioners Certificate of Commendation (2001)
- Dutch Treat Club Gold Medal for Lifetime Creative Achievement (2002)
- Fraunces Tavern Museum Book Award (2002)
- New England Library and Information Network Award (2001)
- Palm Beach Laureate Award (2002)
- Phi Beta Kappa Book Award
- Pulitzer Prize
- Ruth Bogan Creative Living Award, M.V. (2002)
- The Henry James Award/ Edith Wharton Women of Achievement Awards (2001)
- The Holland Society Gold Medal for Distinguished Literacy Achievement (2002)
- The Los Angeles Public Library Literary Award (2002)
- Theodore H. White Lecturer/Joan Shorenstein Center, JFK School of Government/Harvard University (2002)
- Townsend Honoree/New England Society in the City of New York (2001)
- William Bradford Award/Pilgrim Society

== Errors ==
In 2009, McCullough acknowledged that he misquoted Thomas Jefferson in John Adams. He was criticized in a Harper's Magazine review of the book, which claimed that McCullough had mistakenly attributed Jefferson as having referred to the second president as a "colossus of independence." Upon being confronted with the accusation, McCullough admitted that he had, in fact, "erred". "It's hard work; you're trying to get the truth about distant times," he told the Associated Press. "When you make the mistakes, it's very painful, but you will make mistakes. We're imperfect, in an imperfect world."
