= 1776 (book) =

2005 book by David McCullough

- The cover's artwork is The Capture of the Hessians at Trenton by John Trumbull.
- Author: David McCullough
- Language: English
- Subject: History/U.S. History/American Revolution/Military History
- Genre: Non-fiction
- Published: May 24, 2005; Simon & Schuster, Inc.
- Publication place: United States
- Pages: 386
- ISBN: 978-0-7432-2671-4 (hardcover); 978-0-7432-2672-1 (paperback); 978-1-4165-4210-0 (Illustrated Edition)
- OCLC: 57557578
- Dewey Decimal: 973.3 22
- LC Class: E208 .M396 2005
- Preceded by: John Adams
- Followed by: The Greater Journey

1776 (released in the United Kingdom as 1776: America and Britain at War) is a book written by David McCullough, published by Simon & Schuster on May 24, 2005. The work is a companion to McCullough's earlier biography of John Adams, and focuses on the events surrounding the start of the American Revolutionary War. While revolving mostly around the leadership (and often indecisiveness) of George Washington, there is also considerable attention given to King George III, William Howe, Henry Knox, and Nathanael Greene. Some Revolutionary War engagements detailed in the book include the Fortification of Dorchester Heights, the Battle of Long Island, and the Battle of Trenton. The activities of the Second Continental Congress and the signing of the Declaration of Independence are treated in less detail, as the focus is on military rather than political events. The book includes multiple pages of full color illustrations, including portraits and historical battlefield maps made by British engineers at the time.

== Illustrated edition ==
1776: The Illustrated Edition

1776: The Illustrated Edition was released on October 2, 2007. The Illustrated Edition contains 140 images and thirty-seven removable replicas of source documents. More than three dozen source documents—including a personal letter George Washington penned to Martha about his commission, a note informing the mother of a Continental Army soldier that her son has been taken prisoner, and a petition signed by Loyalists pledging their allegiance to the King—are re-created in uniquely designed envelopes throughout the book and secured with the congressional seal.

The text closely mirrors the original book, but omits or summarizes some parts deemed too long. The Illustrated Edition comes with its own protective slipcase, decorated with The Capture of the Hessians at Trenton, December 26, 1776 by John Trumbull and has a "fake watermark" of the Great Seal of the United States on the back and front. The book is plain covered in blue with the golden embossed numbers "1776".

== Reception ==
1776 was selected as part of the 2005 and 2006 CSAF Professional Reading Program. 1776 is also a New York Times and Amazon bestseller.
