= The Wright Brothers (book) =

2015 book by David McCullough

- The Wright Brothers book
- Author: David McCullough
- Language: English
- Genre: History
- Publisher: Simon & Schuster
- Publication date: October 14, 2016
- Pages: 320
- ISBN: 1476728747
- Preceded by: The Greater Journey

The Wright Brothers is a 2015 non-fiction book written by the popular historian David McCullough and published by Simon & Schuster. It is a history of the American inventors and aviation pioneers Orville and Wilbur Wright. The book was on The New York Times Non-Fiction Best Sellers list for seven weeks in 2015.

== Production ==
McCullough first became interested in writing a book on the Wright brothers while researching for his book The Greater Journey, which explored the history of various notable Americans who lived in Paris during the 19th century. In an interview with The Seattle Times, McCullough recalled, "I didn't know when (chronologically) I was going to end that book, and who do I run into in France but the Wright brothers." He continued, "I was delighted to find that Wilbur, at every chance, went to the Louvre to look at paintings, and the degree that he was moved by the great Gothic works of France was far beyond that of an ordinary tourist. [...] Much of what has been written about the Wright brothers (in French) has been ignored. That's what pulled me into doing the book."

McCullough has had a lifelong interest in aviation. In an interview with the Santa Barbara Independent, he remarked, "I loved to make model airplanes when I was a young boy and I took flying lessons later on; I would have continued if they weren’t so expensive. But I have to say in all candor that I knew very little about [the Wright brothers]. I knew they were from Ohio, I knew they were bicycles mechanics, and I knew they invented the airplane. But I really didn’t know anything beyond that of any substance..." He added, "Once I got into their lives and into all that they went through and the truly admirable human qualities that they personified, I would have wanted to write the book even if they hadn't succeeded in inventing the flying machine."

== Reception ==
The Wright Brothers has been praised by literary critics and historians. Janet Maslin of The New York Times described it as a "concise, exciting and fact-packed book [that] sees the easy segue between bicycling and aerial locomotion, which at that point was mostly a topic for bird fanciers and dreamers." She added, "Mr. McCullough presents all this with dignified panache, and with detail so granular you may wonder how it was all collected." In The New York Review of Books, the novelist James Salter wrote, "Having twice won both the National Book Award and the Pulitzer Prize for his best-selling histories and biographies, McCullough is a much-loved dean of Americana, and his new book, a dual biography, has a warm appeal." Writing in The Washington Post, Reeve Lindbergh, daughter of the famed aviator Charles Lindbergh, called The Wright Brothers a "superb new book" and wrote, "McCullough's magical account of their early adventures — enhanced by volumes of family correspondence, written records, and his own deep understanding of the country and the era — shows as never before how two Ohio boys from a remarkable family taught the world to fly." Bruce Watson of the San Francisco Chronicle observed, "The Wright Brothers will do more than help Americans tell Orville from Wilbur. Fighting the persistent myth of invention's 'aha' moment, McCullough shows the importance of experiment, error and inspiration in nature. Although they studied early gliders, Orville and Wilbur also watched birds. 'Learning the secret of flight from a bird,' Orville said, 'is a good deal like learning the secret of magic from a magician.' Likewise, to learn history from a master storyteller is to relive the past."

Bob Hoover of the Star Tribune was slightly more critical of the work, remarking, "Although this new biography, The Wright Brothers, refreshes their often-told story in McCullough's upbeat, minutely researched manner, something's lacking — interesting characters. While the brothers accomplished their goal of powered flight, they missed out on the stuff that makes life interesting — relationships, children, hobbies, fun and, most of all, self-reflection." He concluded, "Despite their old-fashioned manners and plain style, the Wright brothers were reticent and difficult people, traits that McCullough seemed unwilling to explore in his search for the virtues and strengths he values so much in American life." Buzzy Jackson of The Boston Globe similarly described it as "a tidy and relatively short history" of the Wright brothers and praised the author's attention to detail, despite noting, "While there is much to like here, McCullough's gee-whiz attitude toward America's favorite flying Boy Scouts does feel a bit retro."
