= Accolades received by Sense and Sensibility =

Accolades received by Sense and Sensibility may refer to:

- Accolades received by Sense and Sensibility (2008 TV serial)
- Accolades received by Sense and Sensibility (film)

== See also ==
- Sense and Sensibility (disambiguation)
