= Smithsonian World =

American TV series

Smithsonian World was a one-hour science, arts, and humanities documentary series which aired on PBS television stations in the United States from 1984 to 1988. The series was co-produced by the Smithsonian Institution and WETA-TV and periodically hosted by future Pulitzer Prize-winning author and historian David McCullough. The program addressed topics related to the Smithsonian Institution in some way. The New York Times described it as being similar to the Smithsonian Institution, "ambitious, eclectic and chockablock". It was nominated for and won an Emmy for Outstanding Informational Series in 1987.

== See also ==
- Smithsonian magazine
