= Edward Jacobson =

American businessman

- Born: June 17, 1891; New York City, New York, U.S.
- Died: October 25, 1955 (aged 64)
- Cause of death: Heart attack
- Occupation: Businessman
- Known for: Close friend and business partner of Harry S. Truman; advocacy for U.S. recognition of Israel
- Parents: David Jacobson; Sarah Rubin Jacobson

Edward Jacobson (June 17, 1891 – October 25, 1955) was an American Jewish businessman. He is best known as an Army comrade, business partner, and close friend of President Harry S. Truman.

== Biography ==
Jacobson was born in New York City's Lower East Side. His parents, David (1851–1935) and Sarah Rubin Jacobson (1862–1941) were impoverished Jewish immigrants from Lithuania. Jacobson had three brothers and two sisters. The family moved to Kansas in 1893, settling in Leavenworth, before finally relocating to Kansas City, Missouri in 1905.

Jacobson met Truman in 1905, when both worked in downtown Kansas City. They renewed their acquaintance during World War I, when in 1917 they reported for basic training at Fort Sill, near Lawton, Oklahoma, with a unit of soldiers from the Kansas City area. They successfully managed a canteen together, and were thus inspired to open a haberdashery together after the war. The business failed as a result of the post-war recession and the resulting debts burdened both for many years. Jacobson spent the rest of his career as a traveling salesman, which enabled him periodically to visit Truman in Washington. According to David McCullough, Jacobson had open access to the Oval Office.

When Jacobson first heard about what was happening to the Jews in Germany before and during World War II, he took to discussing it with Truman. After he heard the post-war reports regarding the Holocaust and its survivors, his talks with Truman about how to help the Jewish people became more intense. Because Jewish leaders in the U.S. knew Jacobson was a friend of the President, they approached him to lobby Truman with even more fervor.

On March 13, 1948, Jacobson visited Truman at the White House, and persuaded him to meet with Zionist leader Dr. Chaim Weizmann. Truman had been increasingly irritated by lobbying from Zionists, and had issued instructions that he did not want to see any more Zionist spokesmen, but Jacobson reminded him about his admiration for Andrew Jackson. He said "Your hero is Andrew Jackson. I have a hero too. He's the greatest Jew alive. I'm talking about Chaim Weizmann. He's an old man and very sick, and he has traveled thousands of miles to see you. And now you're putting him off. This isn't like you, Harry." Truman then agreed to meet with Weizmann. Partly as a result of Jacobson's efforts, the United States became the first nation to grant diplomatic recognition to the new state of Israel on May 14, 1948.

In 1949, Jacobson visited Israel, where he met with Prime Minister David Ben-Gurion and President Weizmann. One Kansas City rabbi told reporters that Jacobson should become President of Israel, and Truman wrote him that while Israel "couldn't nominate a better man, I sincerely hope you won't take it." Jacobson rejected the suggestion, saying that it was just "a silly dream of a very emotional rabbi", and that he was "too proud of my American citizenship to trade it for any office in the world."

After Truman's retirement in 1953, Jacobson had wanted to be his escort for his first visit to Israel. However, before he had the chance, he died of a heart attack in 1955.

== Timeline ==
- 1893: Moved with his family to Leavenworth, Kansas
- 1905: Moved with his family to Kansas City, Missouri
- 19-teens: Worked as a clerk in a Kansas City clothing store
- 1917–1919: Served as a private in Supply Company, 129th Field Artillery, 60th Brigade, 35th Division, U.S. Army
- 1919–1922: Partnered with Harry S. Truman in the Truman & Jacobson haberdashery, 104 West 12th St., Kansas City, Missouri
- 1922–1945: Traveling salesman in the clothing business
- 1945–1955: Proprietor, Eddie Jacobson's Westport Menswear, Kansas City, Missouri
- 1947–1948: Urged President Truman to support the creation of a Jewish homeland in the British Mandate of Palestine – now Israel
