= The Path Between the Seas =

1977 nonfiction book by David McCullough

- Cover of the first edition.
- Author: David McCullough
- Language: English
- Genre: History
- Publisher: Simon & Schuster
- Publication date: 1977
- Publication place: United States
- Pages: 698
- ISBN: 978-0-671-22563-6
- Preceded by: The Great Bridge
- Followed by: Mornings on Horseback

The Path Between the Seas: The Creation of the Panama Canal, 1870–1914 (1977) is a book by the American historian David McCullough, published by Simon & Schuster. The 698-page book contains 80 photographs, two maps and extensive source references. It won the U.S. National Book Award in History, the Francis Parkman Prize, the Samuel Eliot Morison Award, and the Cornelius Ryan Award.

The book details people, places, and events involved in building the Panama Canal. The title refers to the connection between the Atlantic and Pacific oceans that the opening of the canal created.

Making extensive use of letters and interviews with participants and their surviving relatives, the author presents the personal side of the difficulties of the original French effort, and the massive financial losses caused by the failure of that effort; the American negotiations with Colombia, and the machinations that brought about the independence of Panama; and the personalities and conflicts of the principal players in the American effort. This personal aspect is set against the backdrop of the gigantic scale of the construction and the enormous technical difficulties that were surmounted to reach the eventual goal, the prospective benefit of which had long been recognized.

U.S. President Jimmy Carter has said that the treaties passing control of the Canal to Panama would not have passed the U.S Senate had it not been for McCullough's book. “All through the Senate debates on the issue,” McCullough observes, “the book was quoted again and again, and I’m pleased to say that it was quoted by both sides. Real history always cuts both ways."

== See also ==
- History of the Panama Canal
