= The Johnstown Flood (book) =

1968 book by David McCullough

The Johnstown Flood: The Incredible Story Behind One of the Most Devastating Disasters America Has Ever Known
- Author: David McCullough
- Language: English
- Subject: Biography/U.S. History
- Genre: Non-fiction
- Publisher: Simon & Schuster
- Publication date: 1968
- Publication place: U.S.
- Pages: 302
- ISBN: 9780090874903
- OCLC: 36853
- Followed by: The Great Bridge (book)

The Johnstown Flood: The Incredible Story Behind One of the Most Devastating Disasters America Has Ever Known is a 1968 book written by popular historian David McCullough about the Great Flood of 1889 which devastated the town of Johnstown, Pennsylvania. For this, his first book, McCullough spent time speaking with individuals who lived through the flood on top of his other research in preparation for writing. Upon its publication The Johnstown Flood rekindled national interest in the flood and was the catalyst to McCullough's accomplished career. Following the success of his book, McCullough decided to devote his time entirely toward writing.

== See also ==
- The Johnstown Flood (1989 film)
