= The Great Bridge (book) =

1972 book by David McCullough

The Great Bridge: The Epic Story of the Building of the Brooklyn Bridge
- Author: David McCullough
- Language: English
- Subject: Biography/U.S. History
- Genre: Non-fiction
- Publisher: Simon & Schuster
- Publication date: 1972
- Publication place: U.S.
- Pages: 636 pages
- ISBN: 978-0671457112
- OCLC: 482678
- Preceded by: The Johnstown Flood
- Followed by: The Path Between the Seas

The Great Bridge: The Epic Story of the Building of the Brooklyn Bridge is a 1972 book about the construction of the Brooklyn Bridge written by popular historian David McCullough. It provides a history of the engineering that went into the building of the bridge as well as the toils John A. Roebling, the designer of the bridge, went through with his son Washington Roebling to bring the bridge to its completion. The book went on to win two awards in 1973; the Certificate of Merit Municipal Art Society, NY, and the New York Diamond Jubilee Award.

The documentary film, Brooklyn Bridge, released in 1981 by Ken Burns, Roger Sherman, Buddy Squires, and Amy Stechler drew inspiration from McCullough's work. He was also chosen to be the narrator for the film.
