= David McCullough =

American historian and author (1933–2022)

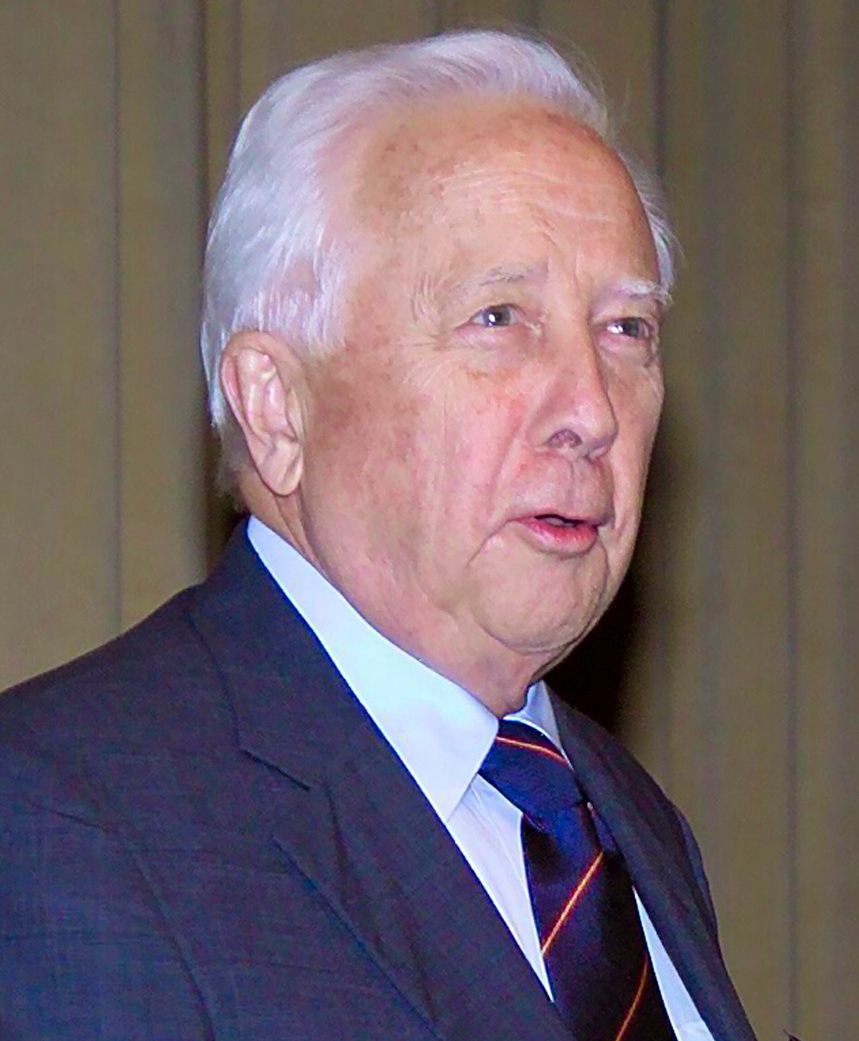
- McCullough in 2005
- Born: David Gaub McCullough; July 7, 1933; Pittsburgh, Pennsylvania, U.S.
- Died: August 7, 2022 (aged 89); Hingham, Massachusetts, U.S.
- Education: Yale University (BA)
- Occupations: Historian; narrator
- Spouse: Rosalee Barnes (m. 1954; died 2022)
- Children: 5
- Writing career
- Period: 1968–2019
- Subject: American history
- Notable awards: Presidential Medal of Freedom (2006); Pulitzer Prize (1993, 2002); National Book Award (1978, 1982)

David Gaub McCullough (/məˈkʌlə/ mə-KUL-ə; July 7, 1933 – August 7, 2022) was an American popular historian and author. He was a two-time winner of both the Pulitzer Prize and the National Book Award. In 2006, he was given the Presidential Medal of Freedom, the United States' highest civilian award.

Born and raised in Pittsburgh, McCullough earned a bachelor's degree in English literature from Yale University. His first book was The Johnstown Flood (1968), and he wrote nine more on such topics as Harry S. Truman, John Adams, Theodore Roosevelt, the Brooklyn Bridge, the Panama Canal, and the Wright brothers. McCullough also narrated numerous documentaries, such as The Civil War by Ken Burns, as well as the 2003 film Seabiscuit, and he hosted the PBS television documentary series American Experience for twelve years. McCullough's two Pulitzer Prize–winning books—Truman and John Adams.—were adapted by HBO into a television film and a miniseries, respectively.

== Early life and education ==
David Gaub McCullough was born in the Point Breeze neighborhood of Pittsburgh, Pennsylvania, to Ruth (née Rankin; 1899–1985) and Christian Hax McCullough (1899–1989) on July 7, 1933. He was of Scots-Irish, German, and English descent. He was educated at Linden Avenue Grade School and Shady Side Academy in Pittsburgh.

One of four sons, McCullough had a "marvelous" childhood with a wide range of interests, including sports and drawing cartoons. McCullough's parents and his grandmother, who read to him often, introduced him to books at an early age. His parents often talked about history, a topic he said should be discussed more often. McCullough "loved school, every day"; he contemplated many career choices, ranging from architect, actor, painter, writer, to lawyer, and considered attending medical school for a time.

In 1951, McCullough began attending Yale University. He said that it was a "privilege" to study English at Yale because of faculty members such as John O'Hara, John Hersey, Robert Penn Warren, and Brendan Gill. McCullough occasionally ate lunch with the Pulitzer Prize–winning novelist and playwright Thornton Wilder. Wilder, said McCullough, taught him that a competent writer maintains "an air of freedom" in the storyline, so that a reader will not anticipate the outcome even if the book is non-fiction.

While at Yale, he became a member of Skull and Bones, the secret society known for its powerful alumni. He served apprenticeships at Time and Life magazines, the United States Information Agency, and American Heritage magazine, where he enjoyed research. He said: "Once I discovered the endless fascination of doing the research and of doing the writing, I knew I had found what I wanted to do in my life." While attending Yale, McCullough studied Arts and earned his bachelor's degree in English with the intention of becoming a fiction writer or playwright. He graduated with honors in English literature in 1955.

== Writing career ==
=== Early career ===
After graduation, McCullough moved to New York City, where Sports Illustrated hired him as a trainee in 1956. He later worked as an editor and writer for the United States Information Agency in Washington, D.C. After working for twelve years in editing and writing, including a position at American Heritage, McCullough "felt that [he] had reached the point where [he] could attempt something on [his] own."

McCullough "had no anticipation that [he] was going to write history, but [he] stumbled upon a story that [he] thought was powerful, exciting, and very worth telling." While working at American Heritage, McCullough wrote in his spare time for three years. The Johnstown Flood, a chronicle of one of the most severe flood disasters in American history, was published in 1968 to high praise by critics. John Leonard of The New York Times said of McCullough, "We have no better social historian." Despite rough financial times, he decided to become a full-time writer, encouraged by his wife, Rosalee.

People often ask me if I'm working on a book. That's not how I feel. I feel like I work in a book. It's like putting myself under a spell. And this spell, if you will, is so real to me that if I have to leave my work for a few days, I have to work myself back into the spell when I come back. It's almost like hypnosis.

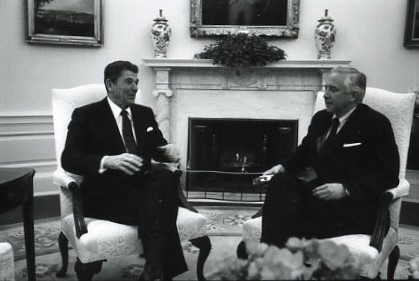
McCullough interviews U.S. President Ronald Reagan in 1981

=== Gaining recognition ===
After the success of The Johnstown Flood, two new publishers offered him contracts, one to write about the Great Chicago Fire and another about the San Francisco earthquake. Simon & Schuster, publisher of his first book, also offered McCullough a contract to write a second book. Trying not to become "Bad News McCullough", he decided to write about a subject showing "people were not always foolish and inept or irresponsible." He remembered the words of his Yale teacher: "[Thornton] Wilder said he got the idea for a book or a play when he wanted to learn about something. Then, he'd check to see if anybody had already done it, and if they hadn't, he'd do it." McCullough decided to write a history of the Brooklyn Bridge, which he had walked across many times. It was published in 1972.

He also proposed, from a suggestion by his editor, a work about the Panama Canal; both were accepted by the publisher. Five years later, The Path Between the Seas: The Creation of the Panama Canal, 1870–1914 was released, gaining McCullough widespread recognition. The book won the National Book Award in History, the Samuel Eliot Morison Award, the Francis Parkman Prize, and the Cornelius Ryan Award. Later in 1977, McCullough travelled to the White House to advise Jimmy Carter and the United States Senate on the Torrijos-Carter Treaties, which would give Panama control of the Canal. Carter later said that the treaties, which were negotiated to transfer ownership of the Canal to Panama, would not have passed had it not been for the book.

=== "The story of people" ===
McCullough's fourth work was his first biography, reinforcing his belief that "history is the story of people". Released in 1981, Mornings on Horseback tells the story of seventeen years in the life of Theodore Roosevelt, the 26th president of the United States. The work ranged from Roosevelt's childhood to 1886, and tells of a "life intensely lived." The book won McCullough's second National Book Award (Note: Mornings on Horseback won the 1982 award for hardcover "Autobiography/Biography". From 1980 to 1983 in National Book Award history there were dual hardcover and paperback awards in most categories, and several nonfiction subcategories including General Nonfiction. Most of the paperback award-winners were reprints, including the 1982 Autobiography/Biography.) and his first Los Angeles Times Prize for Biography and New York Public Library Literary Lion Award. Next, he published Brave Companions, a collection of essays that "unfold seamlessly". Written over twenty years, the book includes essays about Louis Agassiz, Alexander von Humboldt, John and Washington Roebling, Harriet Beecher Stowe, Conrad Richter, and Frederic Remington.

With his next book, McCullough published his second biography, Truman (1992) about the 33rd U.S. president, Harry S. Truman. The book won McCullough his first Pulitzer Prize, in the category of "Best Biography or Autobiography", and his second Francis Parkman Prize. Two years later, the book was adapted as Truman (1995), a television film by HBO, starring Gary Sinise as Truman.

I think it's important to remember that these men are not perfect. If they were marble gods, what they did wouldn't be so admirable. The more we see the founders as humans the more we can understand them.

– David McCullough

Working for the next seven years, McCullough published John Adams (2001), his third biography about a United States president. One of the fastest-selling non-fiction books in history, the book won McCullough's second Pulitzer Prize for "Best Biography or Autobiography" in 2002. He started it as a book about the American Founding Fathers and back-to-back presidents John Adams and Thomas Jefferson, but dropped Jefferson to focus on Adams. HBO adapted it as a seven-part miniseries by the same name. Premiering in 2008, it starred Paul Giamatti in the title role. The DVD version of the miniseries includes the biographical documentary David McCullough: Painting with Words.

McCullough's 1776 tells the story of the founding year of the United States, focusing on George Washington, the amateur Continental Army, and other struggles for independence. Because of McCullough's popularity, its initial printing was 1.25 million copies, many more than the average history book. Upon its release, the book was a number one best-seller in the United States. A miniseries adaptation of 1776 was rumored.

McCullough considered writing a sequel to 1776. However, he signed a contract with Simon & Schuster to do a work about Americans in Paris between 1830 and 1900, The Greater Journey, which was published in 2011. The book covers 19th-century Americans, including Mark Twain and Samuel Morse, who migrated to Paris and went on to achieve importance in culture or innovation. Other subjects include Benjamin Silliman, who had been Morse's science teacher at Yale, Elihu Washburne, the U.S. Ambassador to France during the Franco-Prussian War, and Elizabeth Blackwell, the first female doctor in the United States.

McCullough's The Wright Brothers was published in 2015. The Pioneers: The Heroic Story of the Settlers Who Brought the American Ideal West followed in 2019, the story of the first European American settlers of the Northwest Territory, a vast American wilderness to which the Ohio River was the gateway.

== Personal life ==
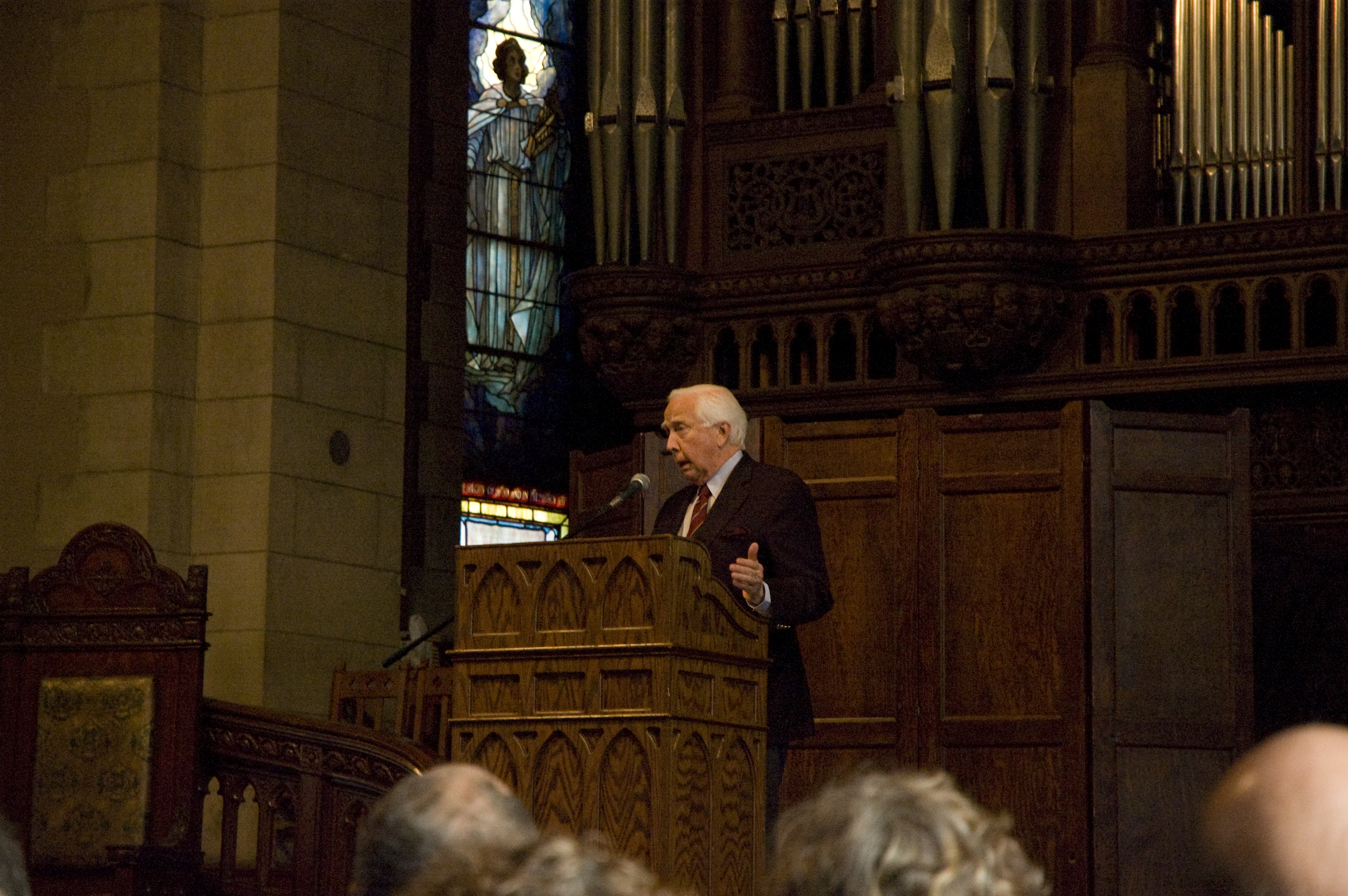
McCullough speaking at Vassar College in 2008

In 1954, McCullough married Rosalee Barnes; the couple had first met as teenagers, and they remained together until her death on June 9, 2022. They had five children, nineteen grandchildren and two great-grandchildren. In 2016, the couple moved from the Back Bay of Boston to Hingham, Massachusetts; three of his five children also lived there as of 2017. He had a summer home in Camden, Maine. McCullough's interests included sports, history, and visual art, including watercolor and portrait painting.

His son David Jr., a retired English teacher at Wellesley High School in the Boston suburbs, achieved sudden fame in 2012, when he gave a commencement speech in which he repeatedly told graduating students that they were "not special"; his speech went viral on YouTube. Another son, Bill, is married to the daughter of the former governor of Florida Bob Graham. McCullough's grandson David McCullough III is the founder of the American Exchange Project.

A registered independent, McCullough typically avoided publicly commenting on contemporary political issues. When asked to do so, he would repeatedly say, "My specialty is dead politicians." During the 2016 U.S. presidential election season, he broke with his custom to criticize Donald Trump, whom he called "a monstrous clown with a monstrous ego."

McCullough taught a writing course at Wesleyan University and was a visiting scholar at Cornell University and Dartmouth College.

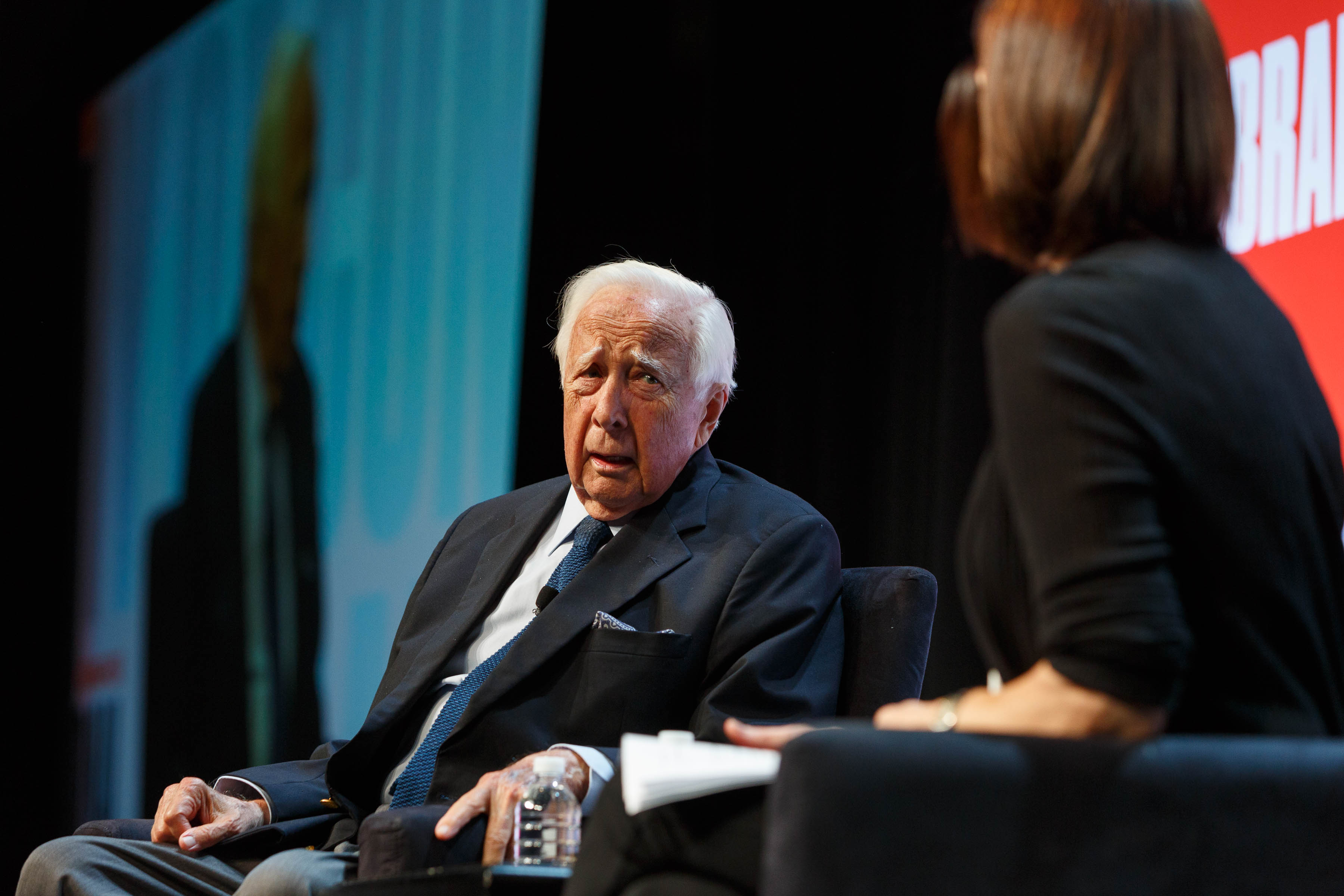
McCullough speaking with Marie Arana on the National Book Festival Main Stage in 2019

After a period of failing health, McCullough died at his home in Hingham on August 7, 2022, at the age of 89, two months after his wife's death.

== Awards and accolades ==
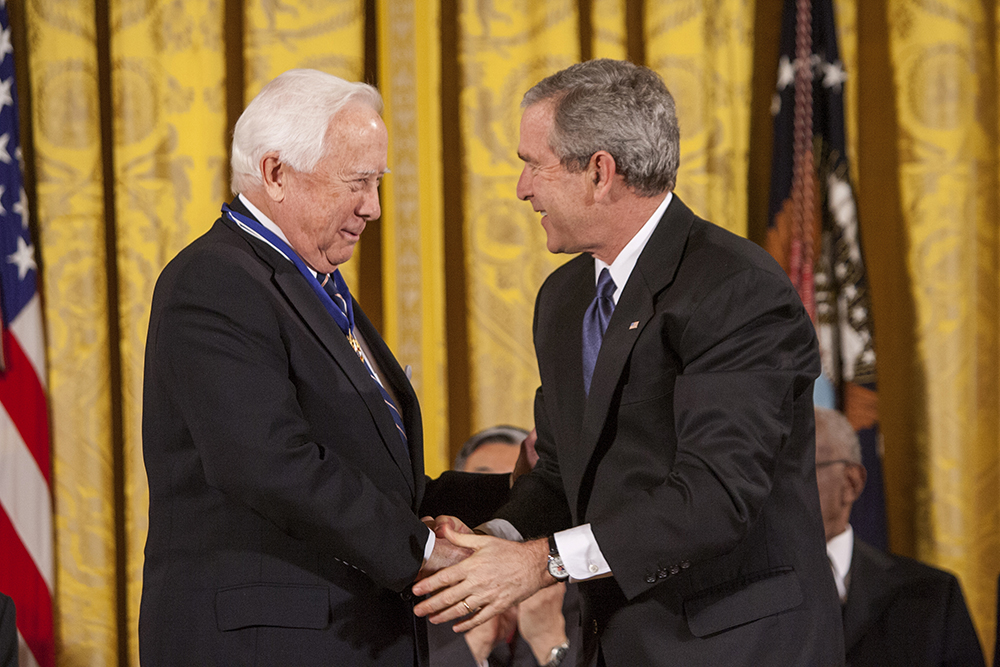
McCullough is presented the Presidential Medal of Freedom by President George W. Bush in 2006

McCullough received numerous awards, including the Presidential Medal of Freedom in December 2006, the highest civilian award that a United States citizen can receive. In 1995, the National Book Foundation conferred its lifetime Medal for Distinguished Contribution to American Letters.

McCullough was awarded more than 40 honorary degrees, including one from the Eastern Nazarene College in John Adams' hometown of Quincy, Massachusetts.

McCullough received two Pulitzer Prizes, two National Book Awards, two Francis Parkman Prizes, the Los Angeles Times Book Prize, New York Public Library's Literary Lion Award, and the St. Louis Literary Award from the Saint Louis University Library Associates, among others. McCullough was chosen to deliver the first annual John Hersey Lecture at Yale University on March 22, 1993. He was a member of the John Simon Guggenheim Fellowship and the Academy of Achievement. In 2003, the National Endowment for the Humanities selected McCullough for the Jefferson Lecture, the U.S. federal government's highest honor for achievement in the humanities. McCullough's lecture was titled "The Course of Human Events".

In 1995, McCullough received the Peggy V. Helmerich Distinguished Author Award. The Helmerich Award is presented annually by the Tulsa Library Trust.

McCullough was referred to as a "master of the art of narrative history." The New York Times critic John Leonard wrote that McCullough was "incapable of writing a page of bad prose." His works have been published in ten languages, over nine million copies have been printed, and all of his books are still in print.

In December 2012, Allegheny County, Pennsylvania, announced that it would rename the 16th Street Bridge in Pittsburgh in honor of McCullough.

In a ceremony at Maxwell Air Force Base in Alabama on November 16, 2015, the Air University of the United States Air Force awarded McCullough an honorary Doctorate of Humane Letters degree. He was also made an honorary member of Phi Beta Kappa at Yale University in 2015.

On May 11, 2016, McCullough received the United States Capitol Historical Society's Freedom Award. It was presented in the National Statuary Hall.

In September 2016, McCullough received the Gerry Lenfest Spirit of the American Revolution Award from the Museum of the American Revolution.

In 2017, McCullough was inducted into the DC Chapter of the Sons of the American Revolution (SAR) and received the National Society SAR Good Citizenship Award.

== Works ==
=== Books ===
Title	Year	Subject matter	Awards	Interviews and presentations
The Johnstown Flood: The Incredible Story Behind One of the Most Devastating Disasters America Has Ever Known	1968	Johnstown Flood		
The Great Bridge: The Epic Story of the Building of the Brooklyn Bridge	1972	Brooklyn Bridge		Presentation by McCullough on The Great Bridge, September 17, 2002, C-SPAN
The Path Between the Seas: The Creation of the Panama Canal, 1870–1914	1977	Panama Canal, History of the Panama Canal	National Book Award – 1978; Francis Parkman Prize – 1978; Samuel Eliot Morison Award – 1978; Cornelius Ryan Award – 1978	
Mornings on Horseback	1981	Theodore Roosevelt	National Book Award – 1982	
Brave Companions: Portraits in History	1991	Previously published biographical essays		
Truman	1992	Harry S. Truman	Pulitzer Prize for Biography or Autobiography – 1993; The Colonial Dames of America Annual Book Award – 1993; Francis Parkman Prize	Booknotes interview with McCullough on Truman, July 19, 1992, C-SPAN; Presentation by McCullough on Truman at the National Press Club, July 7, 1992, C-SPAN
John Adams.	2001	John Adams	Pulitzer Prize for Biography or Autobiography – 2002	Presentation by McCullough on John Adams at the Library of Congress, April 24, 2001, C-SPAN; Presentation by McCullough on John Adams at the National Book Festival, September 8, 2001, C-SPAN
1776	2005	American Revolution, American Revolutionary War	American Compass Best Book – 2005	Presentation by McCullough on 1776 to the Mount Vernon Ladies' Association, June 9, 2005, C-SPAN; Q&A interview with McCullough on 1776, August 7, 2005, C-SPAN; Presentation by McCullough on 1776 at the National Book Festival, September 24, 2005, C-SPAN; Presentation by McCullough on 1776 at the Texas State Capital, October 29, 2005
In the Dark Streets Shineth: A 1941 Christmas Eve Story	2010	Winston Churchill, Franklin D. Roosevelt, Arcadia Conference		
The Greater Journey: Americans in Paris	2011	Americans in Paris during the 19th century, including James Fenimore Cooper and Samuel Morse		Part one and Part two of Q&A interview with McCullough on The Greater Journey, May 22 & 29, 2011, C-SPAN; Presentation by McCullough on The Greater Journey at the National Book Festival, September 25, 2011, C-SPAN; Interview with McCullough on The Greater Journey at the National Book Festival, September 25, 2011, C-SPAN
The Wright Brothers	2015	The Wright Brothers	National Aviation Hall of Fame Combs Gates Award – 2016	Q&A interview with McCullough on The Wright Brothers, May 31, 2015, C-SPAN
The American Spirit: Who We Are and What We Stand For	2017			Q&A interview with McCullough on The American Spirit, April 23, 2017, C-SPAN
The Pioneers: The Heroic Story of the Settlers Who Brought the American Ideal West	2019	American pioneers to the Northwest Territory		Q&A interview with McCullough on The Pioneers, May 19, 2019, C-SPAN

=== Narrations ===
McCullough narrated many television shows and documentaries throughout his career. In addition to narrating the 2003 film Seabiscuit, McCullough hosted PBS's American Experience from 1988 to 1999. McCullough narrated numerous documentaries directed by Ken Burns, including the Emmy Award–winning The Civil War, the Academy Award–nominated Brooklyn Bridge, The Statue of Liberty, and The Congress. He served as a guest narrator for The Most Wonderful Time of the Year, a Mormon Tabernacle Choir Christmas concert special that aired on PBS in 2010.

McCullough narrated, in whole or in part, several of his own audiobooks, including Truman, 1776, The Greater Journey, and The Wright Brothers.

==== List of films presented or narrated ====
- Brooklyn Bridge (1981)
- Smithsonian World (five episodes, 1984–1988)
- The Shakers: Hands to Work, Hearts to God (1985)
- The Statue of Liberty (1985)
- Huey Long (1985)
- A Man, a Plan, a Canal: Panama (NOVA) (1987)
- The Congress (1988)
- American Experience (1988–1999)
- The Civil War (nine episodes, 1990)
- The Donner Party (1992)
- Degenerate Art (1993)
- Napoleon (2000)
- George Wallace: Settin' the Woods on Fire (2000)
- Seabiscuit (2003)
- The Most Wonderful Time of the Year (2010)
