= Mornings on Horseback =

1981 book by David McCullough

Mornings on Horseback: The Story of an Extraordinary Family, a Vanished Way of Life, and the Unique Child Who Became Theodore Roosevelt
- Author: David McCullough
- Language: English
- Subject: Biography/U.S. History
- Genre: Non-fiction
- Publisher: Simon & Schuster
- Publication date: May 1982
- Publication place: U.S.
- Pages: 370 pages
- ISBN: 9780671447540
- Preceded by: The Path Between the Seas
- Followed by: Brave Companions: Portraits in History

Mornings on Horseback is a 1981 biography of the 26th President of the United States Theodore Roosevelt written by popular historian David McCullough, covering the early part of Roosevelt's life. The book won McCullough's second National Book Award and his first Los Angeles Times Prize for Biography.

== Summary ==
"The process by which a spindly, ailing boy grew into this man is one of the enduring American mysteries." – Geoffrey Ward

The story begins in New York in 1869 by introducing the family: father Theodore Roosevelt, Sr., mother Mittie Bulloch Roosevelt and their children Anna (called Bamie), Theodore, Elliott (who becomes the father of Eleanor Roosevelt) and Corinne (called Conie). McCullough then flashes back to the backgrounds of Theodore, Sr. and Mittie, followed by their courtship and marriage, then the stories of their children, ending with Theodore's engagement to Edith Carow.

== Writing process ==
"My intention was not to write a biography of him. What intrigued me was how he came to be." – David McCullough

During his research for The Path Between the Seas, describing the history of the Panama Canal and Theodore Roosevelt's role in its construction, McCullough says "I was interested in knowing what was involved in the metamorphosis of this most conspicuous animate wonder."

Discovering thousands of letters in the Theodore Roosevelt Collection at Harvard's Houghton Library between the members of the Roosevelt family, "I realized what a truly marvelous and very large subject I had." The wealth of correspondence allowed him to reveal the life of a well-to-do Victorian American family in depth heretofore unseen. He says "I've tried to see that individual, not just in the context of his family who were the closest to him and most important to him, but also to see the family in the context of a particular social class in which they were prominent." McCullough speaks of the value in knowing who raised the future President: "If there was one discovery or revelation that meant the most, it was coming to know Theodore Roosevelt, Sr., who is central to this book, as he was in the life of his small namesake. I think it is fair to say that one can not really know Theodore Roosevelt...without knowing the sort of man his father was. Indeed, if I could have one wish for you the reader, it would be that you come away from the book with a strong sense of what a great man Theodore Roosevelt, Sr. was" McCullough chose to end the story "when I thought he was formed as a person, when I felt I could say, when the reader could say, there he is."
