= Sense and Sensibility (2026 soundtrack) =

2026 film soundtrack album

Sense and Sensibility (Original Motion Picture Soundtrack)

Film score by Roger Goula
- Released: 16 October 2026
- Recorded: 2026
- Venue: London
- Studios: Urchin Studios; AIR Studios
- Genre: Film score
- Length: 49:05
- Label: Back Lot Music
- Producer: Roger Goula

Roger Goula chronology
Shark Whisperer (2025)	Sense and Sensibility (2026)	Above the Below (2026)

Sense and Sensibility (Original Motion Picture Soundtrack) is the film score to the 2026 film Sense and Sensibility directed by Georgia Oakley based on Jane Austen's 1811 novel starring Daisy Edgar-Jones, Esmé Creed-Miles, Caitríona Balfe, Frank Dillane, Herbert Nordrum, George MacKay and Fiona Shaw. The original score is composed by Roger Goula and performed by the London Contemporary Orchestra. The score was released through Back Lot Music on 16 October 2026.

== Background and development ==
In June 2026, it was announced that Roger Goula would score the music for Sense and Sensibility. Georgia Oakley came in touch with Goula owing to her liking the score he composed for the documentary Ecosystems and felt that the music also had a connection with the nature, which was also the case with Sense and Sensibility. This is also Goula's maiden score for a period film, which excited Oakley as both "were stepping into the unknown [territory]". Oakley suggested Goula not to score in a way that announce the period or tell the audience how to feel, instead wanting to have an emotion and soul of its own, that connected with the performances as well.

Roger wrote initial sketches of the music inspired by watching the rushes, though they did not meant for particular scenes that provided a rawness and spontaneity, which were responses to the material rather than specific narrative function. Goula initially discussed about the music played in parties and piano pieces that Marianne played were in the end of Baroque era and he composed such pieces that are stylistically inspired by the music of that time. The transitional period from the Baroque to Romantic era intrigued Goula, especially in the setting of late-18th century, where several changes happened—music played in the courts of kings, French Revolution era and most people started to learn piano which was new for people at that time.

This transition made Goula to explore on music inspired by late-Baroque sounds, especially the "Leaving Norland" piece which had a solo violin inspired by Baroque Sonata or minimalistic violin. He also noticed on how the sisters are in the transition period of both eras, where Elinor is the end of Baroque and Marianne represented the Romantic era. Hence, musical cues for the latter were much looser and more romantic, while Elinor's cues were strict and structured. For the romance between Elinor and Edward, Goula wanted a swelling, romantic music of sweeping crescendos, but Oakley interrupted to have a new change, which Goula added: "When Elinor runs up the hill, when we see Edward, and the music stops, normally you would have another cue. I think it's very clever of Georgia to say, no, don't score it, let's see her, let's listen to her breathing going uphill, struggling to go there."

Some of Goula's earlier sketches ended in the final score, especially for the sequence where the Dashwoods leave Norland, where the strings provided a fragility and emotional directness that resonated with her leading to the structure of the musical language being developed. To make the score a bit contemporary, and while discussing with Oakley, Goula decided to use more electronic sounds and less classical, as well as using synthesizers and modifying it with samplers, so that the music could also resonate in the contemporary setting as well.

== Release ==
The soundtrack was released through Back Lot Music on 16 October 2026.

== Reception ==
Jonathan Broxton of Movie Music UK wrote "this version of Sense and Sensibility is an appealing addition to the distinguished musical history of Austen adaptations. Goula does not attempt to recreate [Patrick] Doyle's beloved 1995 score, and that is unquestionably the correct decision. Instead, his contemporary perspective offers a complementary interpretation, one more closely aligned with Oakley's emphasis on emotional realism and the complex bond between the Dashwood sisters. Admirers of sophisticated, intimate period-drama scoring should find much to appreciate here, and the album represents a step forward in Goula's career that could lead to more high-profile international assignments in the coming years, especially if the film itself becomes a player in the upcoming awards season." Ryan Lattanzio of IndieWire called it a "supple string score", while Beatrice Loayza of Variety and Mamta Raut of Mashable India called it a "wistful score".

Vaughan Noble of The Eagle wrote "The unsung hero of the film is its composer Roger Goula, whose beautiful orchestral score reaches the heights of past adaptations of Austen's stories. The emotional tension from the strings balanced with the tenderness of the piano mix perfectly on screen, adding an auditory elegance to the film's visual beauty." Hannah Petit of London Evening Standard wrote "swoony, stirring score". Therese Lacson of Collider called it an "expressive soundtrack". Clarisse Loughrey of The Independent wrote "Roger Goula's score is suitably swooning, too."

== Track listing ==
No.	Title	Length
1.	"The Will"	2:33
2.	"Someone Is Coming"	0:53
3.	"Excessively Comfortable"	1:45
4.	"Elinor and Edward"	0:55
5.	"Meeting the Colonel"	1:38
6.	"Leaving Norland"	2:57
7.	"Barton Life"	1:20
8.	"Meeting Willoughby"	1:18
9.	"A Gentleman Saved Her"	1:31
10.	"Sad Girl"	1:12
11.	"Preparing for the Trip"	1:00
12.	"Trip to London"	2:16
13.	"As Expected"	0:54
14.	"As Your Sister"	1:20
15.	"She Hides Her Feelings"	1:49
16.	"Mr. Ferrar's Christmas Ball"	2:28
17.	"Calm Marianne"	1:46
18.	"The Greatest Distress"	1:47
19.	"At the Gallery"	1:58
20.	"Rage – Lost"	2:02
21.	"Marianne Falls Ill"	2:45
22.	"Pistols!"	1:01
23.	"The Duel"	1:19
24.	"No One Knows Your Heart Like a Sister"	2:59
25.	"In Time I Can Feel Much More"	1:40
26.	"Run to Edward"	1:06
27.	"Elinor and Edward Kiss"	1:47
28.	"Sense and Sensibility"	3:06
Total length:		49:05

== Personnel ==
Credits adapted from Film Music Reporter:

- Music composer and producer: Roger Goula
- Music supervisor: Connie Farr
- On-camera music consultant and additional arrangements: Graham McCusker
- Music editor: David Rodger
- Conductor and lead orchestrator: Hugh Tieppo-Brunt
- Additional orchestrators: Ananda Chatterjee, Harry George, Talia Morey
- Score recording and mixing engineer: Tom Bailey
- Score recordist: John Prestage
- Assistant engineers: Rebecca Hordern, Joey Price
- Score mix assistant: Wil Jones
- Scoring crew: Charlotte Matthews, Katy Jackson
- Additional song engineer: Dan Cox
- Orchestra and choir: London Contemporary Orchestra
- Music preparation: Ananda Chatterjee, Daniel D’Mello Goodwin
- Orchestra leader: Mandhira De Saram
- Vocal coach to Esmé Creed-Miles and Frank Dillane: Pamela Kuhn
- Music coordinator: Georgiamae Bromley
- Musical assistance: Joaquim Badia

Featured on-camera musicians

- Violins: Richard Blayden, Krystof Kohout, Richard Montgomery
- Viola: Elliot Kempton
- Cello: Findlay Spence
- Piano: Graham McCusker
- Flute: Lluís Domènech Plana
- Guitar: Fred Lawton
- Double bass: Louis van der Westhuizen
- Tabor: Sam Nicholls

Featured score musicians

- Violin: Max Baillie
- Piano: Nathan Williamson
- Cello: Brian O’Kane
- Vocalist: Héloïse Werner

== See also ==
- Sense and Sensibility (1995 soundtrack)
