= Great Bridge, Zrenjanin =

Great Bridge Велики мост
- Bridge in 1930s
- Coordinates: 45°22′46″N 20°23′51″E

Characteristics
- Design: Henrik Fekete
- Material: Steel
- Total length: 31.9m

History
- Construction start: April 1904
- Opened: December 1904
- Demolished: 1969
- Replaced by: Pedestrian Bridge

Location
- Interactive map of Great Bridge

The Great Bridge (Serbian: Veliki most, Велики мост) was a steel drawbridge in Bečkerek (known as Zrenjanin after 1948), modern day Serbia. It crossed the Begej river and was built at the same time as the Small bridge.

== History ==
=== Old Bridges ===
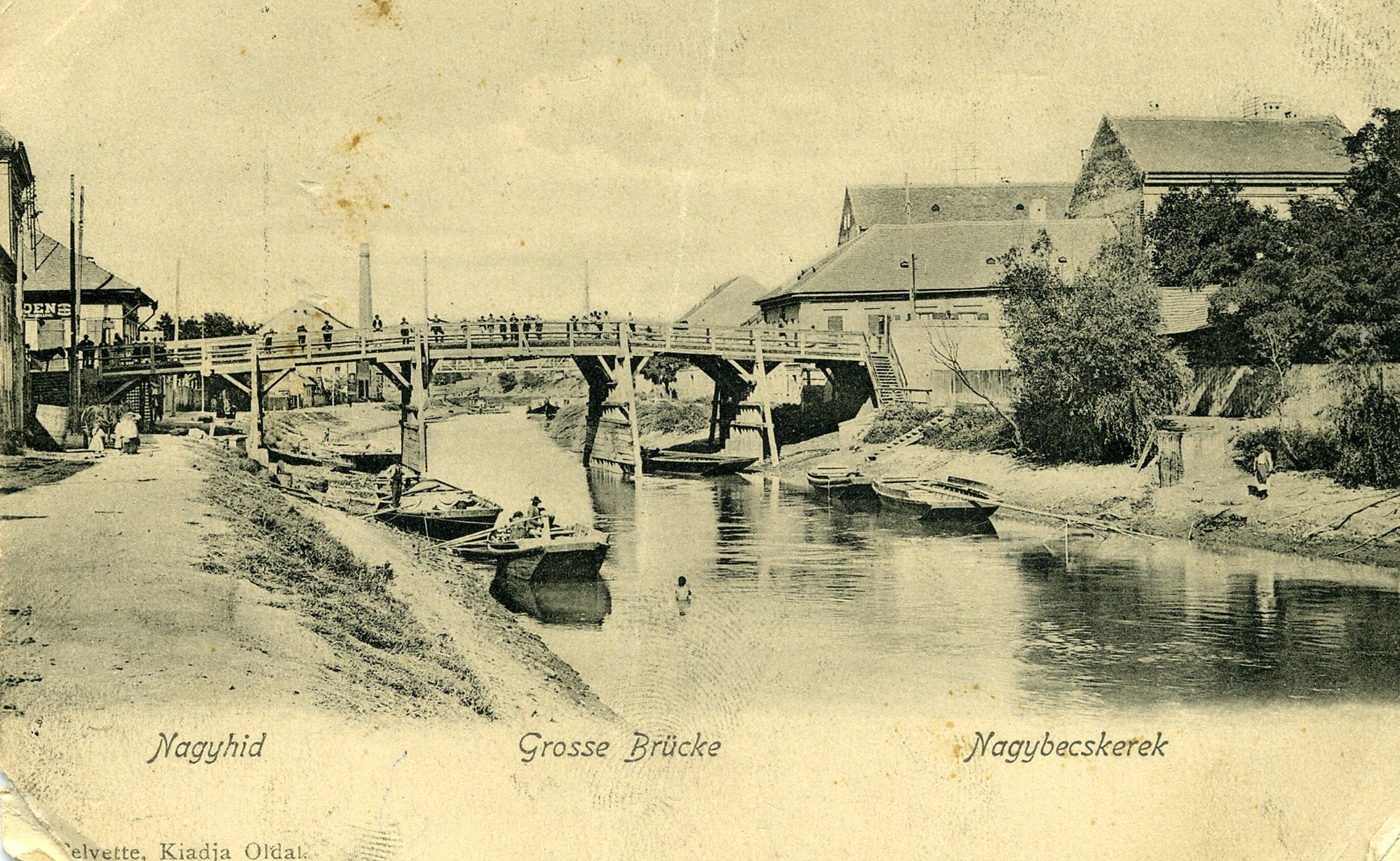
Old wooden Great Bridge around 1895

The first reliable data regarding the existence of the Great Bridge which connected the settlement of Opovo with the city’s historic core, is found on a map from 1769 to 1772. In addition to the Great Bridge, five smaller bridges were built to improve communication between the scattered settlements of Bečkerek. All of them were made of wood.

It is assumed that most of these bridges were heavily damaged or completely destroyed in the fire of 1807. Due to strong winds, the fire quickly spread from the Pivarska mahala to the Great Wooden Bridge, and subsequently to the surrounding town buildings.

Among the first structures rebuilt after the great fire, as early as 1808, was the new Great Bridge on the Begej River. It connected the southeastern part of the town, known as the Opovo with the strict city centre. It directly linked two already established squares: Gabna-tér and Erszébet-tér.

=== New Bridge ===
By the late 1890s cost of frequent repairs and increasingly busy passenger traffic crossing over it have led city authorities to start considering construction of a new bridge. But due to bureaucratic issues construction did not begin until April 1904. It was opened in December of the same year officially named Elisabeth Bridge (Erzsébeth-híd), named after Empress Elisabeth of Austria.

Plans for the Great Bridge were signed by contractors from Budapest: Henrik Fischer, a civil engineer; Árpád Rauch, an engineer; and Henrik Fekete, a designer. The total length of the bridge was 31.9 m. The middle section, spanning 10 m, could be raised by 5.54 m. The width of the roadway was 6 m, while the pedestrian walkway measured 1.4 m.

After World War I, the new authorities renamed the bridge "Dositejev most" (Доситејев мост), after Dositej Obradović.

=== Removal ===
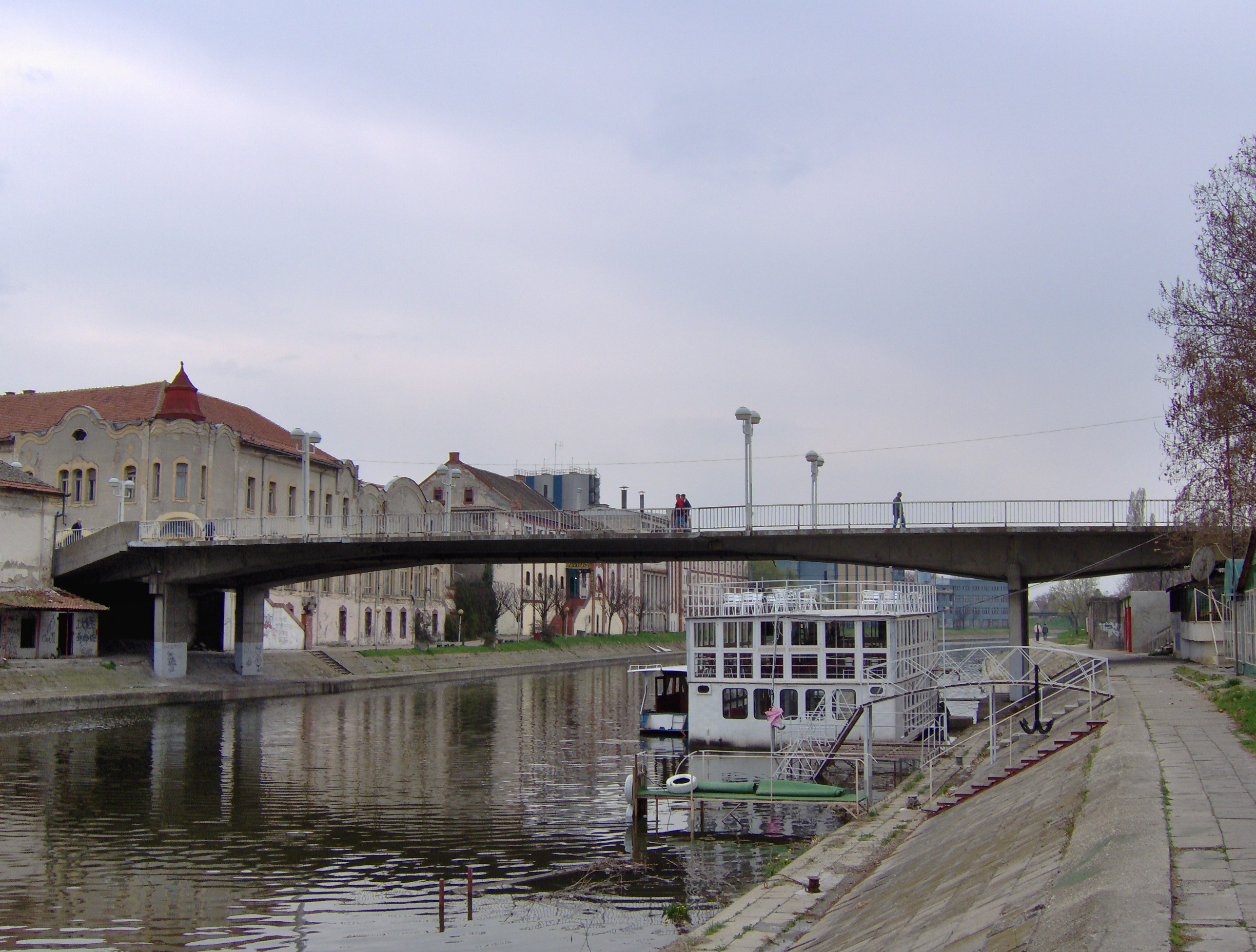
Today's pedestrian bridge at the place where the Great Bridge used to stand

Despite opposition from a segment of the public and experts including the filing of a criminal complaint, the bridge was dismantled in 1969. This was done to regulate the flow of the Begej River and to facilitate new urban interventions in the old city centre, based on the 1958 General Urban Plan. The city authorities argued that the bridge was unsafe and that it lacked sufficient clearance for larger vessels to pass underneath.

In 1971 Great Pedestrian Bridge was erected in place of the Great Bridge.

== Legacy ==
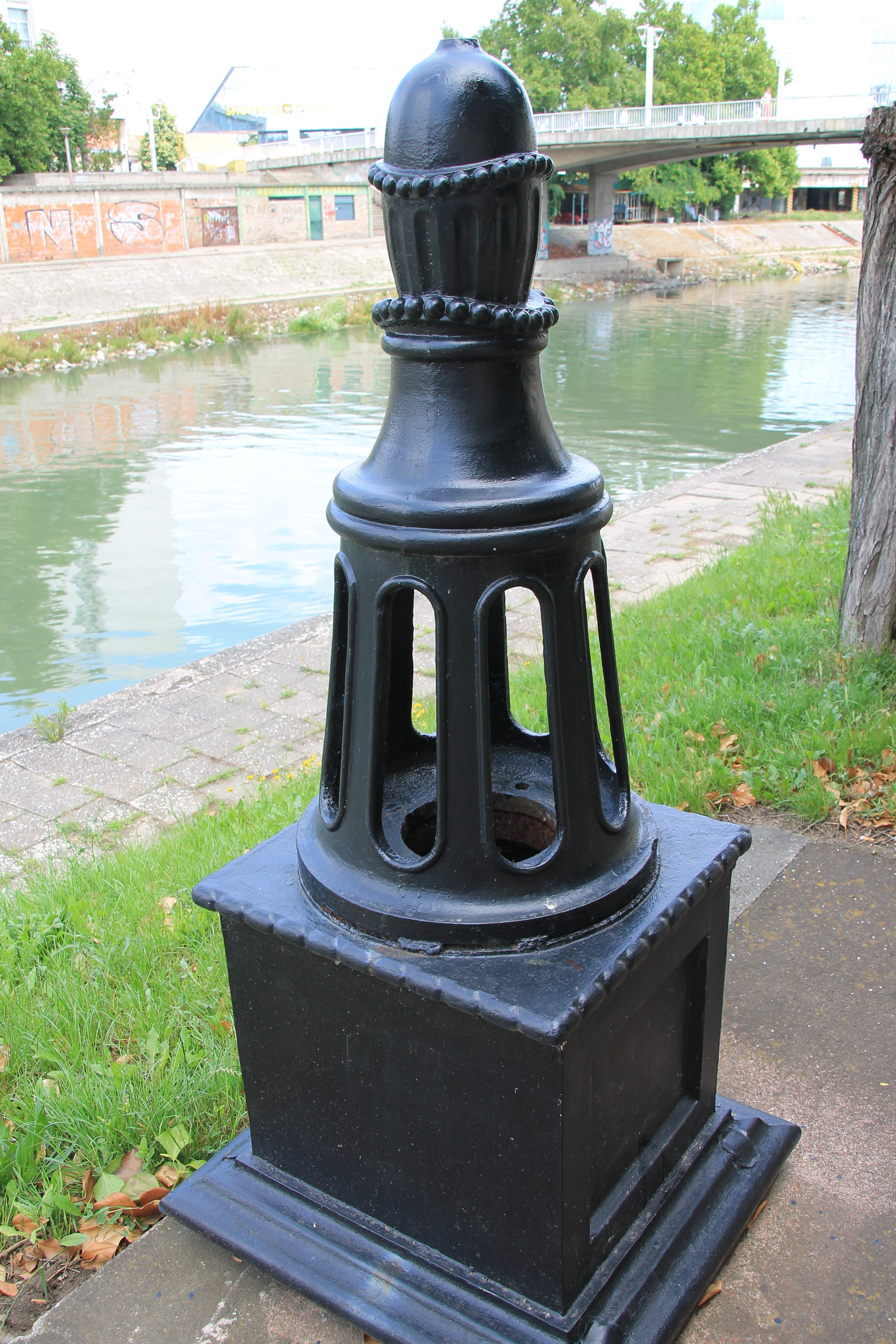
One of four decorative finials near the original location of the bridge

In 2008 town authorities planned to reconstruct the bridge, but the project was denied by the Centre for Preservation of Monuments of Culture because it was inadequate. Reconstruction of the bridge would demand vast corresponding changes in the surrounding area due to dramatic changes after the second world war.

In 2015 bridge's surviving decorative finials were moved near the site of the 1971 replacement pedestrian bridge.

This bridge in often incorrectly called Eiffel bridge, suggesting that Gustav Eiffel or his company were involved in its construction process. However, no archival documentation exists to substantiate this claim.

== See also ==
- Zrenjanin
