= A Walk in the Clouds (soundtrack) =

Soundtrack album by Maurice Jarre
- Released: 1995
- Length: 35:07
- Label: Milan
- Producer: Maurice Jarre

A Walk in the Clouds is the original soundtrack recording of the 1995 Golden Globe-winning film A Walk in the Clouds starring Keanu Reeves, Aitana Sánchez-Gijón, Anthony Quinn, Giancarlo Giannini and Debra Messing. Released on the Milan Records label, the original score and songs were composed by Maurice Jarre, except "Crush the grapes" and the famous "Mariachi Serenade,” which were composed by Leo Brouwer (music) and Alfonso Arau (lyrics). The film won the Golden Globe Award for Best Original Score.

== Track listing ==
1. "Victoria" – 7:29
2. "Butterfly Wings" – 2:54
3. "The Harvest" – 3:01
4. "Crush the Grapes" – 2:17
5. "First Kiss" – 3:15
6. "Mariachi Serenade" – 2:49
7. "Fire and Destruction" – 10:17
8. "A Walk in the Clouds" – 3:05

== Credits ==
- Maurice Jarre – producer, composer (1,2,3,5,7,8)
- Liona Boyd – guitar (classical guitar solo)
- Febronio Covarrubias – performer (4,6)
- Ismael Gallegos Color D' Luna – performer (4,6)
- Juan Jimenez – performer (4,6)
- Roberto Huerta – performer (4,6)
- Alfonso Arau – lyrics (4,6)
- Leo Brouwer – composer (4,6)
