= Sense and Sensibilia =

Sense and Sensibilia is the title of:

- Sense and Sensibilia (Aristotle), one of the treatises by Aristotle that make up the Parva Naturalia
- Sense and Sensibilia (Austin book), a 1962 work of ordinary language philosophy by J. L. Austin

== See also ==
- Sense and Sensibility, a novel by Jane Austen
