= Sense and Sensibility (1995 soundtrack) =

1995 film soundtrack album

Film score by Patrick Doyle
- Released: 1995
- Genres: Stage & Screen
- Length: 42:41
- Label: Sony Music Entertainment

Patrick Doyle chronology
A Little Princess (1995)	Sense and Sensibility (1995)	Mrs. Winterbourne (1996)

Sense and Sensibility is the original soundtrack of the 1995 film of the same name starring Emma Thompson, Alan Rickman, Hugh Grant, Kate Winslet and Tom Wilkinson. The original score was composed by the Scottish composer Patrick Doyle, a friend of Thompson's who had worked with her on many previous films. Director Ang Lee tasked Doyle with creating a gentle score reflecting the emotional suppression of the society featured in the film. Doyle subsequently created a score which he described as "suppressed" with "occasional outbursts of emotion", in keeping with the film's storyline.

The score also includes two songs sung by the character of Marianne Dashwood, which Doyle adapted from two poems. His musical score earned the composer his first nominations for the Academy Award for Best Original Score and the BAFTA Award for Best Film Music. He lost both awards to Luis Enríquez Bacalov's score of the Italian film Il Postino. Sony Music Entertainment released the soundtrack to Sense and Sensibility on 12 December 1995. Due to his work in Sense and Sensibility and other films based on novels, Doyle has become best known for his work composing literary adaptations.

== Development and composition ==
The film's original score was written by the Scottish composer Patrick Doyle. Doyle was friends with actors Kenneth Branagh and Emma Thompson, and had worked on many films directed by the former, including Henry V (1989) and Much Ado About Nothing (1993). Thompson hired him to score the 1995 film Sense and Sensibility, in which she was writing and starring. Sense and Sensibility's director, Ang Lee, requested Doyle write a score that was gentle, intimate, and a reflection of "the suppressed emotions of that society".

Doyle later described the film as "more stifled; the music had to be suppressed to match what was happening onscreen. You had this middle-class English motif, and with the music you would have occasional outbursts of emotion". Marianne Dashwood, one of the film's protagonists, uses music as her primary expressive outlet, a characteristic that is emphasised in the film. She sings two songs which Doyle composed before filming began. Ang Lee felt the songs helped convey the duality of the story. The first song's lyrics were taken from a 17th-century poem by John Dowland entitled "Weep You No More Sad Fountains". Its lyrical content represents Marianne's innocence, romantic outlook, and connection to nature, according to the Austen scholar Sue Parrill. The song's melody also appears in the beginning of the film and during certain points of the story marking transition.

Marianne's second song, which she learns from her suitor Colonel Brandon, is adapted from a poem by Ben Jonson, and refers to discovering love in a dream and being filled with feelings of desire and guilt. As the song is sung later in the film, Ang Lee felt it portrayed Marianne's "mature acceptance". The dramatic soprano Jane Eaglen also sang the song in the closing credits. As the story reaches its conclusion, Doyle's music gradually changes from depicting youth and innocence to adulthood; after Marianne survives a fever, the score shifts to representing "maturity and an emotional catharsis".

== Release and reception ==
Professional ratings
Review scores
Source	Rating
AllMusic	4/5 stars

Sony Music Entertainment released the soundtrack to Sense and Sensibility on 12 December 1995. For his work in the film, Doyle earned his first nominations for the Academy Award for Best Original Score and the BAFTA Award for Best Film Music. He lost both to Luis Enríquez Bacalov's score of the Italian film Il Postino. In a review of Doyle's work in various films, Glen Chapman of the website Den of Geek wrote that "the [Sense and Sensibility] score itself works fine within the context of the film, and is suitably romantic, but it's a shame that it's a score like this that got him a nomination and not a truly original one like his debut".

Similarly, AllMusic writer Darryl Cater did not feel the film represented Doyle's best work, explaining that "most of it simply recycles melodic phrases from his previous stuff. Nonetheless, Sense and Sensibility has a pleasant romanticism in its orchestrations, and the vocal solos by renowned soprano Jane Eaglen are quite good". Writing for The Daily Telegraph, Alan Titchmarsh called the score a "delicious masterpiece" and recommended it to film music fans. National Public Radio's Liane Hansen and Andy Trudeau felt the score's portrayal of restricted emotion was an accurate reflection of the novel's gradual storytelling style. They compared the music in Sense and Sensibility to Doyle's score for Henry V, and described the former as possessing less instrumentation and sounding more wistful and sentimental.

The score has also been reviewed by film and Austen scholars. Sue Parrill described the soundtrack as "stunning", though Kathryn L. Shanks Libin felt that aspects of the film's musical authenticity were "sacrificed to the general richness of the soundtrack". Thomas S. Hischak referred to it as "Doyle's most classically influenced score", observing that the soundtrack "encompasses both lighthearted and sorrowful emotions". Due in part to Doyle's work in Sense and Sensibility, he has become best known for his work composing literary film adaptations.

== Track listing ==
Adapted from:

1. Weep You No More Sad Fountains 3:05 (featuring Jane Eaglen)
2. A Particular Sum 1:15
3. My Father's Favorite 5:27
4. Preying Penniless Woman 1:32
5. Devonshire 1:04
6. Not A Beau For Miles 1:57
7. All The Better For Her 1:17
8. Felicity 1:22
9. Patience 1:42
10. Grant Me An Interview 1:05
11. All The Delights Of The Season 1:14
12. Steam Engine 1:19
13. Willoughby 1:39
14. Miss Grey 2:21
15. Excellent Notion 1:39
16. Leaving London 2:12
17. Combe Magna 2:59
18. To Die For Love 2:55
19. There Is Nothing Lost 0:59
20. Throw The Coins 3:08
21. The Dreame 2:30 (featuring Jane Eaglen)

Total Album Time: 42:41

== See also ==
- Sense and Sensibility (2026 soundtrack)
