= Clanville =

Hamlet in Hampshire, England

Coordinates: 51.23809°N 1.54419°W

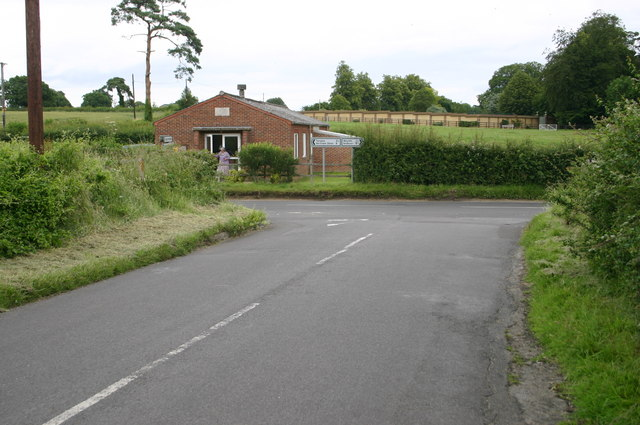
- Coronation Hall, Clanville

- Location within Hampshire
- OS grid reference: SU319488
- Civil parish: Penton Grafton
- District: Test Valley
- Shire county: Hampshire
- Region: South East
- Country: England
- Sovereign state: United Kingdom
- Post town: ANDOVER
- Postcode district: SP11
- Dialling code: 01264
- Police: Hampshire and Isle of Wight
- Fire: Hampshire and Isle of Wight
- Ambulance: South Central
- UK Parliament: North West Hampshire

Clanville is a hamlet in the civil parish of Penton Grafton in the Test Valley district of Hampshire, England. The hamlet lies within the North Downs Area Of Outstanding Natural Beauty on the Hampshire-Wiltshire border. Its nearest town is Andover, which lies approximately 5.6 miles (9.1 km) south-east from the village.

Clanville has a village pub, the Lion, and a village hall, known as the Coronation Hall, which dates from 1953. The former St Margaret's Chapel dates from c1860 and is now a private residence.

Clanville House is a Grade II* listed mansion, dating from the early 18th century.

Blissamore Hall is a modernised stately home, with parts dating from the 17th century. An earlier manor on the site is listed in the 1086 Domesday Book. Also known as Clanville Lodge, its former residents include General Edward Mathew, and the High Sheriff of Hampshire, Henry Bosanquet. In 1967, it was developed as an equestrian stud which from 1995 was operated by Sir Christopher and Lady (Jennie) Bland.

== Notable former residents ==
- Archie Bland – writer, journalist and former Deputy Editor of The Independent newspaper
- Lady Georgia Byng – children's author
- The Hon. Jamie Byng – owner of Canongate Books
- Sir Christopher Bland – former chairman of British Telecom, the BBC and the RSC
