= Canongate (disambiguation) =

The Canongate is a district in Edinburgh, Scotland.

Canongate may also refer to:

- Canongate Books, a publisher
- A district in Jedburgh, Scotland
- Canongate, a suburb of St Andrews in Scotland
- Canongate Myth Series, a series of short novels
