= List of Molly Moon characters =

This is a list of characters from Georgia Byng's Molly Moon series of children's novels, which consist of Molly Moon's Incredible Book of Hypnotism, Molly Moon Stops the World, Molly Moon's Hypnotic Time-Travel Adventure, Molly Moon, Micky Minus and the Mind Machine, Molly Moon and the Morphing Mystery, and Molly Moon and the Monster Music.

== Main protagonists ==
=== Molly Moon ===
Molly Moon is an intelligent 11-year-old orphan with purple-pink blotchy legs, curly brown hair, a steady droning voice, large, hypnotic green eyes, and a "potato nose." She likes eating ketchup sandwiches and drinking orange squash concentrate. She is played by Raffey Cassidy in the movie. Molly Moon's name derives from the fact that she was found on the doorstep of the Hardwick House in a Moon's Marshmallows box. She got her name because there was a lollipop stick in the marshmallow box, so Ms. Trinklebury, the orphanage nanny named her Lolly. Ms. Adderstone, the headmistress, forbade Lolly as a name, so she was renamed, Molly.

Throughout the series, Molly learns to hypnotize, stop time, time travel, mind read, and morph.

=== Micky Minus ===
Micky Minus is the twin brother of Molly Moon. He was named Micky after the St. Michael's Hospital tag he wore around his wrist. During the travel to the 26th century, this tag is snapped in half - one half reading "ST. MICHAEL'S HOSPITAL MALE LO" and the other half reading "GAN TWIN."

Like his sister, Micky has huge hypnotic potential. Once in the 26th century, his powers are harnessed for a large empire. To ensure the young hypnotist doesn't revolt, Princess Fang and Miss Cribbins pretend that he is very sick and would die without their medication. Even his last name suggests that the boy is worthless.

Micky changes his last name to Moon to match his sister.

=== Petula ===
Petula is Molly's cute, lovable black pug and a main character in the book series. She was once owned by Miss Agnes Adderstone but was rescued by Molly. Before, Petula was grumpy, lazy, and didn't like anyone. Once Molly hypnotized her, Petula was nicer and more caring (to certain people). Afterward, Petula learned to hypnotize, and in book two, she learned how to freeze the world just like her owner; by doing this, she even saved Molly's life.

In book four, Petula helped Molly enter the mind machine room by hypnotizing Miss Cribbins' evil pet, Taramasalata, and hypnotizing Miss Terryaki to be a guinea pig and save Molly's brother, Micky, and Lily Black.

=== Forest ===
Forest is Sinclair Cell's yoga teacher, who's a stereotypical hippie with dreadlocks and likes meditating. He plays a secondary role in books two and five but is one of the protagonists in book three. Though he has a weird personality, he can be wise. He taught Molly many aspects of meditation that helped her in book two and suggested some useful ideas about time-traveling in book three.

=== Ojas ===
Ojas is a Hindu Indian boy from 1870 who speaks almost perfect English. He has green eyes like Molly's and a straight nose. After both of his parents died, he began stealing to survive. Molly first met him in book three when he stole her crystals for time traveling. They made a deal, and he returned them to her; they soon became friends. Ojas is one of book three's main characters and appears episodically in book four.

=== Rocky Scarlet ===
Rocky Scarlet is Molly's best friend with a talent for voice-only hypnotism. He first appears in book one and plays an important role in all the books.

== Main antagonists ==
=== 'Professor' Simon Nockman ===
Simon Nockman (Professor Nockman) is a chubby, ill-groomed man who wears a gold scorpion pendant. He has 'bulbous' eyes and greasy black hair; he doesn't shower much; instead, he uses cologne to cover up the smell, giving him a terrible odor.

Simon Nockman's cruel way of life began at an early age when his pet budgerigar, Fluff, was caught in a rat trap set out by his landlord. His immoral parents didn't console him (his mother actually laughed). Because of his parents' and the landlord's lack of sympathy, he became a hateful person. Since then, he has committed a range of crimes and schemes. At the age of eleven, he learned how to steal goods. When he was an adult, he tricked an old lady into giving him her life's savings which she thought were for a stray-dog home. With that money, he bought his warehouses in Manhattan and started his business of dealing in smuggled goods and designer rip-offs.

After the Shorings Bank incident, he was hypnotized by Rocky to be kind and good. Molly also hypnotized him to have a German accent, as the police might recognize his original Chicago accent.

To make him a better person, Molly told him that he could have a budgerigar whenever he did a good deed. He managed to get 20 budgerigars between books one and two. His German accent wore off at the end of book two, and he now speaks in his original scruffy Chicago accent. At the end of book two, Nockman and Miss Trinklebury get engaged but have not appeared in the subsequent books.

=== Primo Cell ===
Primo Cell is the hypnotist father of Molly and Micky. He is good at heart but was unfortunately hypnotized by Lucy Logan to control celebrities, become president, and build a time-traveling crystal mine for his master's master while killing people who got in his way. He is rich (his money accumulated from his brands and products while being controlled) and ran for the American president. He won the election and became President-Elect but stepped down after being woken from his hypnotism. Primo became a different man when Molly released him from his bonds and showed remorse for what he'd done; he even confessed to his daughter (though unknowingly) and her friends that he now felt very lonely as he had no real friends and was loved by no one.

=== Maharaja of Waqt ===
The Maharaja of Waqt ('Waqt' is Hindi for time) is a power-crazy man who kidnaps 11-year-old Molly and Petula from the 21st century. The Maharaja resides in 1870 India, and is a large and scaly man (He is scaly due to so much time-traveling). He is the villain of book three. Waqt was only able to speak in spoonerisms "...had something wrong with the way he talked. He got his words back to front - frack to bunt. He spoke in 'spoonerisms'."

To scare Molly, Waqt kidnapped four younger Mollys (aged 1, 3, 6, and 10), Petula as a puppy, as well as Rocky and Forest from the 11-year-old Molly's time. He has a servant called Zackya, and he is the first enemy of Molly that doesn't get reformed.

After Molly escapes from Waqt, she begins to use her newly found time travelling skills. She also finds that time traveling makes your skin dry and wrinkly but finds a way to go to the beginning of time and hovers in the "Bubble of Light," which makes all who enter it younger.

She brings Waqt back in time, showing him her secret to traveling time extremely quickly but decides to leave him where there is only vegetation so he can survive. He will only be able to return to his time when he learns to love and care for others, and his crystal will "open", allowing for quicker and more precise time travel.

=== Princess Fen Fang Feng Fong Yang Yong Yin Ying Kai-Ying Qingling ===
Also known as Princess Fang, this dangerous character is the villain of book four, who resides in Mont Blanc. On the outside, she seems like an excitable, over-intelligent 6-year-old descendant of brilliant 26th Century scientists. In reality, she is a vain, 60-year-old nightmare. After traveling to the Bubble of Light at the beginning of time to feed her unhealthy obsession with beauty, Princess Fang's outward appearance became that of a child. In the process, parts of her brain became childlike, and she surrounded herself with sickening toys.

Fang has a dangerous machine that can suck knowledge out of a person's head and put it into another's. Using time-travelling hypnotists, Fang kidnapped Molly Moon's twin brother and hypnotised all the residents of Mont Blanc. Similar to the Maharaja of Waqt (who talks in spoonerisms), Fang has a speech impediment which causes her to pronounce her 'r's as 'w's and her 'th's as 'f's, making her sound even more childlike.

=== Miss Hunroe and her followers ===
Miss Hunroe and her followers, Miss Teryaki, Miss Speal, Miss Suzette, and Miss Oakkton, are the antagonists of book five. They appear good at the start, tricking Molly and Micky by saying they are average hypnotists trying to stop the man Theobald Black. They send Molly and Micky to stop him, although he is just a person who funds orphanages, unlike the cunning con-man hypnotist they portray him as. However, things soon turn, and they are revealed to be witches bent on controlling the weather with the mysterious four Logan Stones. They had actually planned to steal a book in Mr. Black's Possession: ''Hypnotism, Volume Two: The Advanced Arts, as Miss Hunroe wished to learn how to morph into other humans. Apparently Miss Hunroe had known who Molly Moon was and most of her life. Miss Hunroe is revealed to have been a very popular woman who lives off having her followers around, and it is suggested that she has always been a "bully," and she had a condition to hate everyone but herself. Her followers are desperate to gain love and attention and will do anything to get this, and Miss Hunroe tends to use this to her advantage.

== Minor antagonists ==
=== Agnes Adderstone ===
Miss Agnes Adderstone is a bone skinny, mean woman with false teeth. She is the headmistress of the Hardwick House Orphanage, dislikes children, especially babies, and hates Molly, especially out of all the orphanage children. However, she favors Hazel because it is learned that she looked like her when she was dropped off on the doorstep of Hardwick House. Later on, Molly hypnotizes her to love planes and flying.

Agnes was absent during book two but returned in book three when Molly traveled back in time to return her past selves to their proper times. Molly instructed her to fart, burp in company, and be kind to the children under her care when she was very drunk. Before hypnotised by Molly, Petula the pug belonged to Miss Adderstone, and was fed chocolate cookies that caused stomach aches.

=== Edna ===
Edna (surname unknown) is a mean, grumpy older woman. She is the cook of Hardwick House and was in the Navy as a sailor. She is rumored to have a tattoo of a sailor on her thigh. Later on, Molly hypnotizes her to develop a passion for Italian cooking and the country of Italy. Molly also hypnotizes Edna to favor Molly and cook good food for all the orphans except Mrs. Adderstone, Hazel Hackersly, and Hazel's friends, who are served painfully spicy food.

== Minor characters ==
=== Davina Nuttel ===
Davina Nuttel is a spoiled, not particularly pretty, child star whose lead part in Stars on Mars was stolen by Molly. She has dirty blond hair, blue eyes, and a weak ability to hypnotize to get what she wants; however, she isn't conscious of this. After Molly left New York, Davina got her part back. In book two, she was kidnapped by Primo Cell.

=== Mrs. Trinklebury ===
Mrs. Trinklebury is a kind, stuttering old widow from the village of Hardwick. She took care of Molly and Rocky when they were babies. It is also revealed that she is an orphan herself. In book two, she and Nockman fell in love and became engaged.

=== Mrs. Toadley ===
Mrs. Toadley is a chubby, half-bald woman who is 'blubbery-faced.' She is a teacher and is notorious for sneezing when she gets worked up (allowing Molly and Rocky to copy each other's answers). All of her students strongly dislike her. Molly hypnotizes her to tell people she is a terrible teacher, getting her fired.

=== Orphanage children ===
- Hazel Hackersly is a 13-year-old girl who's not that pretty with a whiny voice. She is the most favored by Miss Adderstone out of the orphanage children. While Molly and Rocky were away, she took over Miss Adderstone's bedroom. Her parents were actors who didn't spend time with or care about her. When Haze first came to the orphanage, Molly was kind to her, but she pushed her away. It's revealed that she was mean to Molly because she was jealous that Rocky and Molly had Mrs. Trinklebury to love them as a mother. In book two, she dyes her hair platinum blonde and gets a walk-on part in an American film, so she has a fake American accent.
- Roger Fibbin is a 12-year-old boy who is Hazel's informant and spy and updates her on all the goings-on behind her back. In book two, it was revealed that he was hypnotized after seeing an argument between Cornelius and Lucy Logan. About a year later, Molly restored him to his normal self. While Molly and Rocky were away, he took over the sanitorium after a fight with Hazel.
- Cynthia and Craig Redmon are 13-year-old twins.
- Ruby Able is a five-year-old girl and one of the few people who is nice to Molly at Hardwick House. In book two, it is revealed that she sticks her pictures up with bubble gum.
- Jinx Eames is a five-year-old boy who is good friends with Ruby.
- Gordon Boils is the second oldest at the Hardwick House and a messenger of Hazel. Gordon invented the names 'Drono', 'Zono,' and 'Bog Eyes' for Molly, which were later discovered to be key hypnotists' abilities.
- Gerry Oakley is 6-years-old, and Gemma's eager best friend. He loves mice, and at the beginning of book two, he has ten; his favorite is called Victor.
- Gemma Patel is Gerry's 7-year-old best friend. At the end of book one, Gemma is the one who tells Molly all that has happened at Hardwick House. She was also the one who found the copy of the hypnotism book in Book two.

=== Cornelius Logan ===
Cornelius Logan, a twin to Lucy Logan, is a brilliant hypnotist who hypnotized and controlled Primo Cell for 11 years so that Primo would become President of America and he could rule the world. He stole Molly and put her in the orphanage because he was jealous of Lucy's happiness and wanted to ruin her life. Molly later hypnotised Cornelius to believe that he was a lamb. In book three, it was revealed Cornelius had been controlled by the Maharaja of Waqt at a very young age.

=== Lucy Logan ===
Lucy Logan is the great-granddaughter of Dr. Logan, the hypnotist who wrote the book Molly discovered. In book one, she is portrayed as the librarian in Briersville Library and has a major role in leading her daughter to uncover her hypnotic talent (using hypnosis). It was revealed in book two that Lucy had been hypnotized, put in a deep trance, and controlled for 11 years by her twin brother, Cornelius Logan. It was also revealed in the third book that Lucy is the mother of Molly and Micky Logan, and her husband is Primo Cell. Primo Cell (who was also hypnotized by Cornelius Logan) is also a hypnotist. A fake Lucy (Cornelius) tried to kill Molly in book two because Primo had been de-hypnotized.

=== Sinclair Cell ===
Sinclair was an orphan. Until the age of four, he and his sister Sally were under the care of a circus ringleader who adopted them (Sinclair and Sally bear no blood ties). The ringleader was a powerful hypnotist to pose a potential threat to Primo Ce l. Primo hypnotized the ringleader and his wife, who became gardeners at Cell's mansion. Primo also adopted Sinclair and Sally. Sinclair pretended to love Primo as a father, but he always hated him. Loving Primo was the only way Sinclair wouldn't be hypnotized (unfortunately, Sally crossed the line and was hypnotized).

Sinclair appears in book two and is fit and tanned with shoulder-length blond hair and blue eyes. He saved Molly and Rocky from the "magpie killer." He hypnotized them for 7 1/2 months to be safe from Primo. Once released from their hypnotic bounds, Molly, Rocky, and Sinclair hypnotized Primo. If it weren't for Sinclair, Molly and Rocky would be dead, and Primo would theoretically rule the world.

=== Lily Black ===
Lily Black is a minor heroine from book five. She is a spoilt and sulky girl with black curly hair and blue eyes. She is determined and desires to be part of the action, annoyed that her father won't teach her the art of hypnotism. She plays an important role in the book's plot, particularly in the second half.

=== Nurse Meekles ===
Nurse Ai Mu Meekles is a kind, friendly woman at the palace where Princess Fang ruled. She respected Molly and watched Micky in his early childhood. Nurse Meekles helped the twins escape using a secret laundry chute. Her husband's name is Axel, also known as Professor Selkeem (Meekles spelled backward.)

=== Professor Selkeem/Axel ===
He's the degenerated and good mad child genius, formerly known as the good hypnotist Axel. He is the husband of Nurse Meekles and lost his hypnotic abilities - a side effect of traveling to the Bubble of Light at the beginning of time too often. His skin is like leather, and he has a habit of drinking tomato juice which appears like blood to Molly, leaving her to believe he is evil. He consumes rotten eggs and moldy toast, and is said to keep shriveled hearts in his treehouse laboratory, but they turn out to be sun-dried tomatoes. He always speaks in riddles and rhymes and likes talking to himself. After he lost his hypnotic skills, his mind, and became ugly in the Princess' eyes, he was sent to live with the Zooeys (the mutated former Royal family) as his servants. Here, he experimented harmlessly, though crazily. He has pet dognakes (snakes with Labrador heads), and his favorite is called Schnapps. He loathes Princess Fang and deeply distrusts Wildgust, a member of the mutated Royal family, since he believes he is evil. His intentions are misunderstood for a great part of the story.

== Hypnotized people ==
=== Hypnotized by Primo Cell ===
Primo Cell, in the 11 years he was hypnotized, managed to hypnotize 3000 people (that is what he tells Molly when she hypnotizes him), including:

- Suky Champagne – a young film actress. She wins an Oscar in book two and comments on the bathroom attendant.
- Hercules Stone – a Hollywood actor. An African American, he is named after the mythical Greek character Hercules, who was the son of Zeus. In March 2003, he was on the cover of Welcome To My World standing on a high cliff by the sea, wearing a Tarzan-like a toga, with his black hair in dreadlocks. The headline said, Hercules Stone Invites Us Into His Malibu Villa. He wears a special kind of deodorant. He is known to flirt with women, as he was seen with a beautiful Chinese woman at the 2003 Oscar Awards. In 2003 he bought an instant hair growth product called Bye Bye Bald. Hercules likes hamburgers, but he is nit-picky about how to make them, and in March 2003, he tipped his whole burger off his plate when he was not satisfied with how it was made. It is unknown what happened to him. He was later seen with Mrs. Trinklebury that November and went out for dinner with the series's main characters at a French restaurant, along with the rest of the famous Hollywood stars.
- Billy Bob Bimble – child singing star, friendly with Rocky.
- King Moose – boxer
- Cosmo Ace – actor
- Tony Wam – karate expert
- Shaggy Haired Boy and Girl – friends with Billy Bob Bimble
- Gloria Heelheart – an actress nicknamed "Queen of Hollywood."
- Stephanie Goulash – a singer

=== Hypnotized by Molly Moon ===
- Petula
- Edna
- Ms. Adderstone
- The Kids of Hardwick House (including Rocky but in another book)
- Airport staff
- The Staff of Shorings Bank
- Mr. Nockman
- The Actors and Staff of "Stars on Mars" and anyone watching the Broadway show
- Anyone who watched the "Check Out the Kids In Your Neighborhood" commercial (Made by Molly and Rocky to make kids' lives better)
- Anyone watching the Briersville Talent Show
- A taxi driver
- Primo Cell
- Cornelius Logan
- An Indian policeman in the year 1870
- Two shopkeepers in 1870
- Zackya
- Two bossy teenage girls in 2250
- Guards of Princess Fang's Castle
- Ms. Cribbins
- Princess Fen Fang Feng Yang Yong Win Ying Kai-Ying Qingling
- The iris machines of the Shorings Bank vaults

=== Rocky hypnotised ===
- Molly Moon
- His adoptive parents
- Everybody who watched the "Check out the Kids in your Neighborhood" ad.

=== Petula hypnotised ===
- Gerry's mice
- The guard at the Hollywood awards
