= Ragnarok (disambiguation) =

Ragnarök is a series of events in Norse mythology resulting in the fiery destruction and fertile rebirth of the world.

Ragnarok can also refer to:

== Arts and entertainment ==
=== Anime, manga, and light novels ===
- Ragnarok (manhwa), a manhwa series upon which the MMORPG, Ragnarok Online, is based
- Ragnarok the Animation, an anime series based upon the MMORPG, Ragnarok Online
- Sword of the Dark Ones, known as Ragnarok in Japan, a manga series based on a series of Japanese fantasy novels
- Record of Ragnarok, a Japanese manga series

=== Books and short stories ===
- "Ragnarok", a short story written by Argentine writer Jorge Luis Borges
- Ragnarok: The Age of Fire and Gravel, a book by Ignatius L. Donnelly
- Ragnarok: The End of the Gods, novel by A. S. Byatt
- Voyager: Ragnarok, a Star Trek: Voyager novel by Nathan Archer

=== Film and television ===
- Gåten Ragnarok, or simply Ragnarok, a 2013 Norwegian film about the legendary story of Ragnarok
- John Hodgman: Ragnarok, a 2013 American comedy special starring John Hodgman
- Thor: Ragnarok, a 2017 American film featuring the Marvel Comics superhero Thor
- Ragnarok (TV series), a Netflix series first released in 2020

=== Games ===
- Ragnarok (video game), a rogue-like video game
- Ragnarok (board game), a fantasy wargame published by SPI in a 1981 issue (#8) of Ares
- Ragnarok Online, a MMORPG
  - Ragnarok Online 2: Legend of the Second, a MMORPG, sequel to Ragnarok Online
- Rag'Narok, a large-scale tabletop wargame based on the skirmish game Confrontation
- Fate of the Norns: Ragnarok, a table-top RPG set during the Viking Age
- God of War Ragnarök, an action-adventure video game in the God of War series

=== Music ===
- Ragnarok (Norwegian band), a black metal band from Norway
- Ragnarök (Swedish band), a progressive rock band, also their self-titled first album
- Ragnarök (Gwar album), an album by the band Gwar
- Ragnarok (Týr album), a concept album by the band Týr
- Runaljod – Ragnarok, an album by the band Wardruna
- "Ragnarok", a song from the Leaves' Eyes album Njord
- "Ragnarok", a song from the Periphery album Periphery II: This Time It's Personal
- "Ragnarok", a song from the Worm Shepherd album In the Wake ov Sòl
- Ragnarock, a record label in Sweden

=== Fictional characters and elements ===
- Ragnarök (comics), a clone of Thor in the Marvel Comics continuity
- Ragnarok (Soul Eater character), a fictional character in the manga and anime series Soul Eater
- Ragnarök, a creator-owned depiction of Thor by Walt Simonson
- Project Ragna Rok, a Nazi plan to win World War II in the Hellboy comics

=== Events ===
- Ragnarok (gaming event), an annual week-long gaming event held by the Dagorhir Battle Games Association
- Ragnarök Festival, a pagan metal festival in Germany

== Other uses ==
- Ragnarök, the HTML parser in newer versions of the Opera web browser
- Ragnarok, a professional wrestling maneuver used by the Bruderschaft des Kreuzes
- Ragnarok, a satellite cannon in the video game Mega Man Zero 4
