= King's Worthy railway station =

Disused railway station in Hampshire, England

Coordinates: 51.0861°N 1.3018°W

King's Worthy
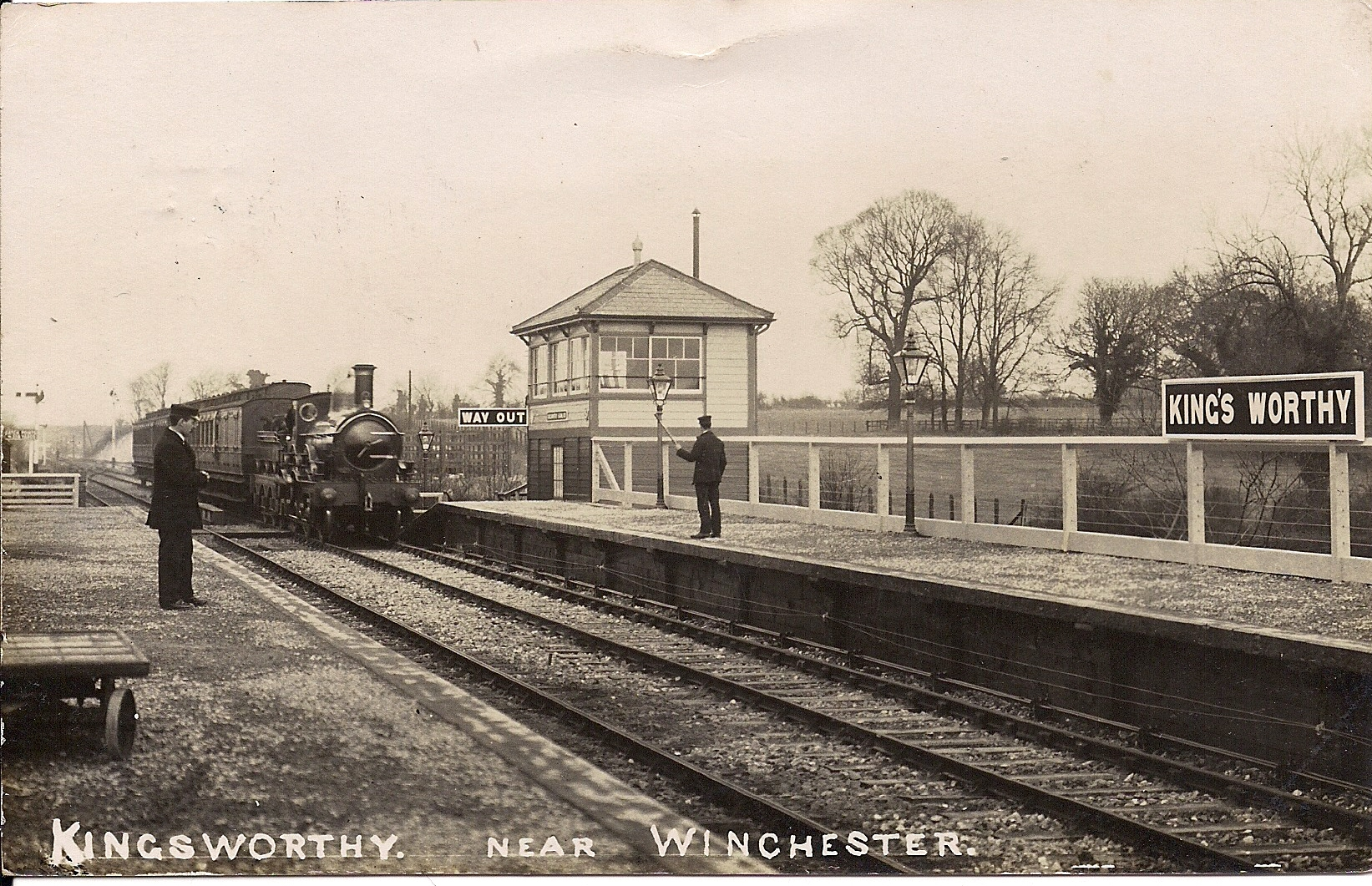
- Station in the 1900s.

General information
- Location: Kings Worthy, Winchester; England
- Grid reference: SU490321
- Platforms: 2

Other information
- Status: Disused

History
- Original company: Didcot, Newbury and Southampton Railway
- Pre-grouping: Didcot, Newbury and Southampton Railway
- Post-grouping: Great Western Railway

Key dates
- 1 February 1909: Opened
- 4 August 1942: Closed
- 8 March 1943: Re-opened
- 7 March 1960: Closed
Location

King's Worthy railway station was a station on the Didcot, Newbury and Southampton Railway in England. It was built in 1909 as a direct petition from local residents of Easton and Abbots Worthy.

Construction of the station resulted in the addition of another passing loop on the line and a single siding which was later provided with a goods shed. Five years before the closure of the station the passing loop was removed leaving the station building on the remaining single platform (previously the northbound platform). The station was demolished after closure and the site is now under the A34 dual carriageway.

== Map ==
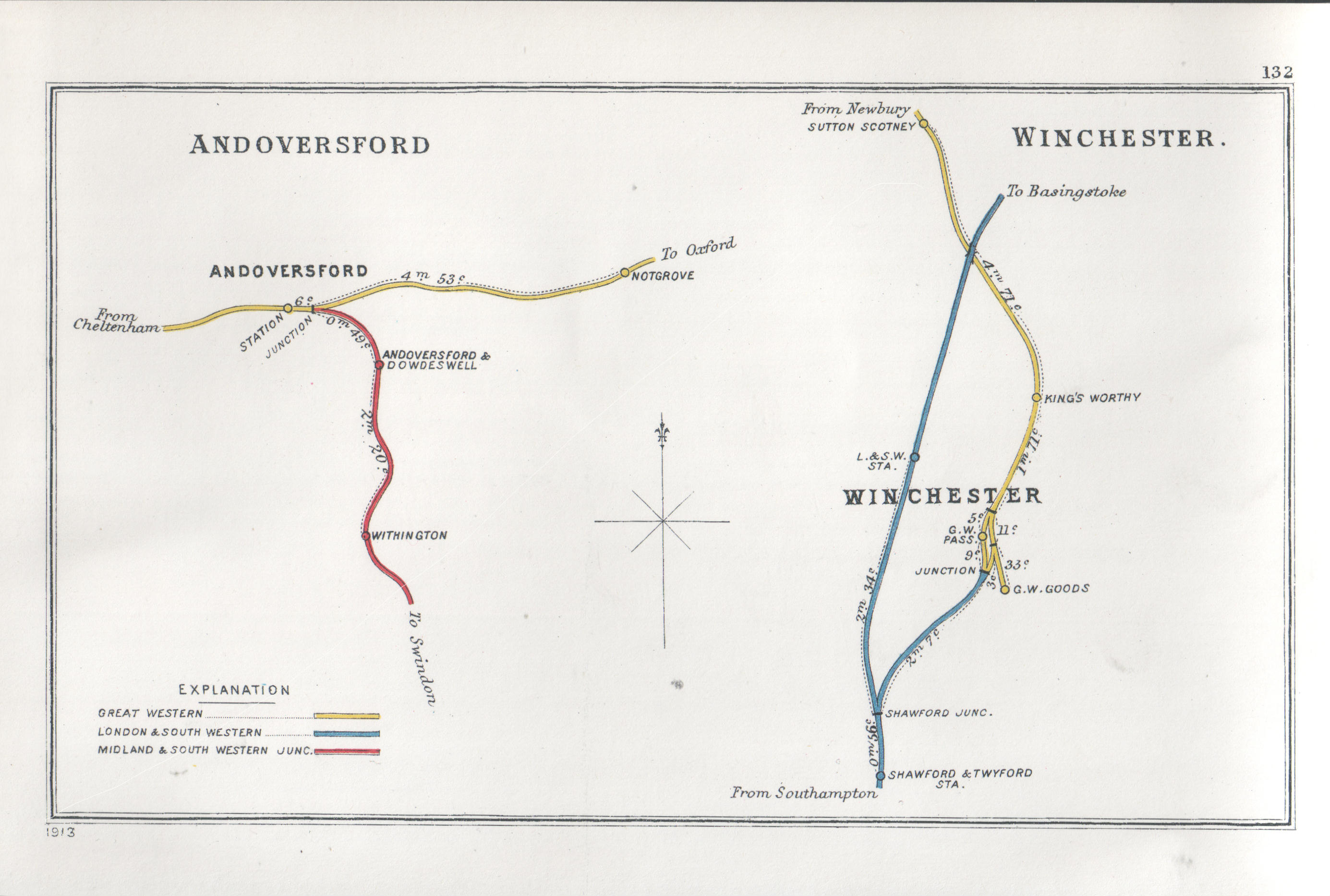
A 1913 Railway Clearing House map showing (right) railways in the vicinity of King's Worthy

== Routes ==
Preceding station	Disused railways	Following station
Worthy Down; Line and station closed	Great Western Railway; Didcot, Newbury and Southampton Railway	Winchester (Chesil); Line and station closed
