= Archie Bland =

British journalist and newspaper editor (born 1983)

- Born: James Franklin Archibald Bland; 7 October 1983 (age 42); Abbots Worthy, Hampshire, England
- Education: Winchester College, Hampshire (Private boarding school)
- Alma mater: Emmanuel College, Cambridge; Columbia University Graduate School of Journalism
- Occupations: Journalist; editor; author
- Employer: The Guardian
- Spouse: Ruth Spencer (m. 2019)
- Father: Christopher Bland

James Franklin Archibald "Archie" Bland (born 7 October 1983), is a British newspaper journalist who wrote The Guardian's daily morning newsletter First Edition from 2022 to 2025.

Bland was previously the deputy editor of The Independent, a national British newspaper, a post to which he was appointed in April 2012, at the age of 28. He was also the editor of the Saturday edition of The Independent. He was one of the youngest people to have ever been appointed to a senior editorial post in the British national newspaper industry, described as "easily the youngest deputy editor in the paper's history, the youngest in national newspapers today and perhaps ever on Fleet Street".

== Early life ==
Bland was born in 1983, the only child of Sir Christopher Bland, the former chairman of the BBC's Board of Governors (the forerunner of the BBC Trust), British Telecom, the Royal Shakespeare Company, London Weekend Television and a number of other companies, as well as Deputy Chairman of the former Independent Broadcasting Authority, and Lady Bland (née Jennifer Mary Denise May).

Bland is the half-brother of four siblings, through his mother's earlier marriage to Thomas Byng, who became the 8th Earl of Strafford. Among the siblings are the author (Lady) Georgia Byng and (The Hon.) Jamie Byng, the owner of publishing house Canongate Books, who attended the same boarding school as Archie Bland, Winchester College.

== Education ==
Between the years 1997 and 2002, Bland was educated at Winchester College, a boarding independent school for boys in Winchester in Hampshire, where he stayed at Boarding House I, known as Turner's (and informally as Hopper's). At Winchester, Bland received high marks, followed by Emmanuel College, Cambridge, at which he became the editor of Varsity, the student newspaper of the university. He was named Guardian Student Columnist of the Year in 2004 (part of the Guardian Student Media Award), for his work as Varsity's editor, and elected to a Senior Exhibition in the years 2004 – 2005, gaining a First in English Literature (BA). He received the Fulbright Alistair Cooke Award in Journalism (part of the Fulbright Program) for 2006–7, a scholarship which enabled him to study at the Columbia University Graduate School of Journalism in New York City, from which he received a master's degree in journalism in 2007. He graduated from Columbia with honors, receiving the school's Henry N. Taylor Award.

== Life and career ==
Bland joined The Independent on Sunday newspaper in 2007 as a graphics researcher. In October 2010, he became Foreign Editor, replacing Katherine Butler, and Deputy Editor of the paper in April 2012. He was a regular columnist in the Independent, and a contributor to the Columbia Journalism Review.

In July 2013, Bland took up a new role as senior writer at both The Independent and The Independent on Sunday newspapers, and in September 2014, he joined The Guardian newspaper. He later became Deputy National Editor of The Guardian before taking up his role writing the newsletter.

Bland won the last-ever episode of the BBC television game show The Weakest Link, in March 2012. He had previously appeared on the programme in 2003, at the age of 19.

In 2019, Bland married Canadian journalist Ruth Spencer.
