= The Worthys =

Coordinates: 51.087808°N 1.295302°W

- Location within Hampshire
- OS grid reference: SU493323
- Civil parish: Headbourne Worthy Itchen Valley Kings Worthy
- District: Winchester
- Shire county: Hampshire
- Region: South East
- Country: England
- Sovereign state: United Kingdom
- Post town: Winchester
- Postcode district: SO
- Dialling code: 01962
- Police: Hampshire and Isle of Wight
- Fire: Hampshire and Isle of Wight
- Ambulance: South Central
- UK Parliament: Winchester

The Worthys is a cluster of villages in the City of Winchester district of Hampshire, located north and north-east of the city itself.

- Abbots Worthy
- Headbourne Worthy
- Kings Worthy
- Martyr Worthy

== Governance ==
Since 2016, three of the villages constitute The Worthys ward of Winchester City Council, with Martyr Worthy lying within the Alresford and Itchen Valley ward; both wards elects three councillors each, and are both within the Itchen Valley ward of Hampshire County Council.

Headbourne Worthy has its own Parish Council, whilst Abbots Worthy is part of the Kings Worthy Parish Council and Martyr Worthy is part of the Itchen Valley parish.
