= Greek mythology retelling =

Genre of fiction

Greek mythology retelling is a literary genre where stories from classic Greek mythology are retold, placed in either a contemporary or futuristic setting. Stories from this genre aim to combine mythological themes like birth, death, and love with modern philosophies of feminism and empowerment.

== History ==
Some early examples of retellings used Greek mythology's Cassandra as the main character. Ukrainian writer Lesia Ukrainka wrote a play, Cassandra, in 1908; East Germany's Christa Wolf wrote a novel in 1983. Recent examples of the genre include The Penelopiad (2005) written by Margaret Atwood that tells the events of Homer's The Odyssey, specifically the tragedy of Penelope, in the 21st century. The book was part of the Canongate Myth Series where contemporary authors rewrite ancient myths. Another influential series in the genre is Rick Riordan's Percy Jackson series, which tells the story of Greek gods and their children living in the modern world. Subsequent series tackling other myths like Norse and Egyptian were also published by Riordan. Ursula K. Le Guin also published a book entitled Lavinia (2008) that retells the story of the Aeneid through the eyes of a minor female character, Lavinia.

Madeline Miller's The Song of Achilles (2011) became the first book to be coined the term. Although the series takes place in the Trojan War, the book gained popularity for its focus on LGBTQ+ relationships. Another popular book was Mythos (2017) by Stephen Fry which is composed of several Greek tales retold and modernized. Recently, the genre was put into scrutiny during the release of the controversial book Crown of Starlight by Cait Corran.

Other examples include:

- Circe by Madeline Miller
- Lore Olympus by Rachel Smythe
- A Thousand Ships by Natalie Haynes
- The Silence of the Girls by Pat Barker

== See also ==
- Mythic fiction
