= Whitney McVeigh =

American artist (born 1968)

- Born: Whitney Osborn McVeigh; 1968 (age 57–58); New York City, U.S.
- Education: Bedales School; Edinburgh College of Art
- Occupation: Multimedia artist
- Spouse: Jamie Byng (sep. 2001)
- Children: 2
- Website: whitneymcveigh.com

Whitney Osborn McVeigh (born 1968) is an American multimedia artist living and working in London, England. Born in New York City, she grew up in London from the age of seven.

== Early life ==
McVeigh is the daughter of Pamela Osborn and Charles McVeigh III, an American banker. She attended Bedales School from 1980 to 1985. While studying for a BA degree at Edinburgh College of Art from 1995 to 1998, McVeigh ran a funk, reggae, and rare groove night club named "Chocolate City" with her then boyfriend Jamie Byng, publisher and managing director of Canongate Books, whom she married in 1996 and with whom she has two children, Leo and Marley. Byng and McVeigh separated in 2001.

== Exhibitions ==
She has travelled extensively to carry out her practice and has held residencies in India, Mexico, China and the Nirox Foundation in South Africa. McVeigh considers herself an autobiographical artist. Exhibitions include Plato in L.A.: Contemporary Artists' Visions at the Getty Villa, Los Angeles, Inventory: Invisible Companion at St Peter's Church, Kettle's Yard, Cambridge, solo project at the Gervasuti Foundation for the 55th Venice Biennale Hunting Song, and New Work at the A Foundation, London (2009).

McVeigh made a film-based artwork during a trip to Syria to create Sight of Memory, screened in Icastica Arezzo 2013. In 2015, she produced a film in collaboration with Pulse Films, 'Birth': Origins at the end of life, shown at the Reynolds Room at Royal Academy as part of an annual event with St Christopher's. McVeigh exhibited Language of Memory at Summerhall Arts Centre, Edinburgh, in 2015–16. In 2009 she was featured in BBC Four Where is Modern Art Now. From 2014 to 2019, McVeigh was Fellow in Creative Practice at the London College of Fashion.
