= Burgham =

Burgham is a surname. Notable people with the surname include:

- Ian Burgham (born 1950), Canadian poet
- Oliver Burgham (1885–1967), English rugby footballer
