= Molly Moon and the Incredible Book of Hypnotism =

- Theatrical release poster
- Directed by: Christopher N. Rowley
- Screenplay by: Tom Butterworth; Simon Bosanquet; Georgia Byng; Christopher N. Rowley; Chris Hurford
- Based on: Molly Moon's Incredible Book of Hypnotism by Georgia Byng
- Produced by: Simon Bosanquet; Georgia Byng; Lawrence Elman; Ileen Maisel
- Starring: Dominic Monaghan; Lesley Manville; Emily Watson; Joan Collins; Raffey Cassidy
- Cinematography: Remi Adefarasin
- Edited by: Dan Farrell; Lesley Walker
- Music by: Peter Raeburn
- Production companies: Amber Entertainment; Lipsync Productions; Constantin Film
- Distributed by: ARC Entertainment
- Release date: 11 April 2015 (Canada)
- Running time: 98 minutes
- Country: United Kingdom
- Language: English

Molly Moon and the Incredible Book of Hypnotism is a 2015 British fantasy film directed by Christopher N. Rowley and starring Dominic Monaghan, Lesley Manville, Emily Watson, Joan Collins and Raffey Cassidy. It is based on Georgia Byng's 2002 novel Molly Moon's Incredible Book of Hypnotism.

== Plot ==
Molly Moon (Raffey Cassidy) lives in an orphanage with her best friend Rocky (Jadon Carnelly-Morris) and her pug dog, Petula. After discovering a book about hypnotism, and learning how to hypnotise, she uses her powers to escape to London and star in a play on the West End. She eventually realises that being a star is not what she wants, and returns to the orphanage.

== Cast ==
- Raffey Cassidy as Molly Moon
- Dominic Monaghan as Nockman
- Lesley Manville as Miss Adderstone
- Emily Watson as Miss Trinklebury
- Celia Imrie as Edna the Cook
- Anne-Marie Duff as Lucy Logan the Librarian
- Ben Miller as Mr Alabaster
- Sadie Frost as Mrs Alabaster
- Omid Djalili as Barry Rix
- Gary Kemp as Cregg
- Tom Wisdom as Charlie Cooper
- Fern Deacon as Hazel
- Jadon Carnelly-Morris as Rocky
- Tallulah Evans as Davina Nuttel
- Joan Collins as Nockman's Mother Tracey
- Jake Swift as Roger

== Reception ==
=== Box office ===
Molly Moon and the Incredible Book of Hypnotism grossed a worldwide total of $41,158. Its 2016 re-release in the United Kingdom grossed a further $1,018.

=== Critical response ===
The film has a 29% approval rating on review aggregator Rotten Tomatoes based on reviews from 14 critics, with an average rating of 4.90 out of 10. On Metacritic, the film has a weighted average score of 30 out of 100, based on 4 critic reviews, indicating "generally unfavorable reviews".

David Noh of Film Journal International praised the performances of Cassidy and Carnelly-Morris, and described the film as "Starting out deep in the 'Harry Potter' vein, but then getting sidetracked into desperately glitzy showbiz shenanigans". Noh concluded that "the movie doesn’t seem to know what it wants to be: teen musical, an adolescent fantasy of fame and fortune, a family-friendly heart-warmer or noisily rambunctious caper film. End result: Despite a handsome, well-designed production, but with a mediocre score of mostly whining emo ditties, Molly Moon succeeds in being none of these things on a satisfying level."

Reviewing the film for Variety, Scott Tobias deemed it "a chintzy children’s fantasy that summons the powers of suggestion, but falls well short of mesmeric." Frank Scheck of The Hollywood Reporter called it "a mostly wan affair that will have little appeal beyond its target audience of young girls." Dave Aldridge of Radio Times awarded the film three stars out of five and wrote, "Molly Moon is easy to criticise but hard to hate. It's corny, but it also represents an ideal fantasy fulfilment for pre-teen girls."

While praising the film's cast, Leslie Felperin of The Guardian described the adaptation as "a rebarbative mess – mirthless and shoddy like a disposable Christmas stocking novelty" and awarded it two stars out of five. Yip Wai Yee of The Straits Times awarded it two stars out of five, finding Molly's character unlikeable and the film's storytelling approach too "over-the-top and in-your-face". Sandie Angulo Chen of Common Sense Media also awarded it two stars out of five.
