= Molly Moon's Incredible Book of Hypnotism =

2002 novel by Georgia Byng

- First edition (UK)
- Author: Georgia Byng
- Cover artist: Amy Ryan
- Language: English
- Series: Molly Moon
- Genre: Children's novel Fantasy fiction
- Publisher: Macmillan Children's Books (UK); HarperCollins (US)
- Publication date: 2002
- Publication place: UK, US
- Media type: Print (Hardcover, paperback)
- Pages: 371
- ISBN: 0-330-39985-3
- OCLC: 52146106
- Followed by: Molly Moon Stops the World

Molly Moon's Incredible Book of Hypnotism is a 2002 children's novel by British author Georgia Byng. It is the first instalment in the Molly Moon six-book series. Amber Entertainment and Lipsync Productions produced a film adaptation, Molly Moon and the Incredible Book of Hypnotism, which was released on April 11, 2015.

== Plot ==
Molly Moon, an orphan at Hardwick House Orphanage in Briersville, England, is living a "boring and plain" life with her best friend Rocky Scarlet, another orphan. She is described as being plain looking with a large "potato" nose, wobbly knees and green eyes. She is usually beaten down upon by Ms. Adderstone, the woman in charge of the orphanage, and Hazel, a snobby orphan girl. During school, Molly and Rocky have a fight and Molly storms away to the town library. As she walks in, she finds a man yelling at the librarian about a book he ordered, but ignores him. While looking in a curious compartment of the restricted section, she finds a book on hypnotism, placed in the wrong section because the "H" was ripped off the spine. Intrigued, she steals it and sneaks out of the library. She takes it back with her to the orphanage to read it.

She fakes being ill so that she can study the book better. Curiously, she finds that chapters 7 and 8 ("Voice-Only Hypnosis" and "Long Distance Hypnosis") are missing. Not long after her discovery of the book, she learns that Rocky has been adopted and taken to America with his new family. Determined to see her friend again, she gains the actual ability to hypnotize from the lessons in her book, first successfully hypnotizing the orphanage dog, Petula. Later on, she is able to hypnotize both Ms. Adderstone and their orphanage chef Edna. Using her ability, Molly wins a large sum of money from a local talent competition, by hypnotizing the crowd into believing that she is a talented singer and dancer. She uses the money to fly to New York City, taking Petula with her. Before leaving, she buys a large gold pendulum, where the mysterious professor from the library learns about her, after he bought some anti-hypnosis glasses. She also hypnotizes Ms. Adderstone and Edna to be nice to all children.

Soon after arriving, Molly hypnotizes her way onto Broadway, landing the lead role in a musical called "Stars on Mars". However, she steals this part from a real child star, named Davina Nuttel, in the process. The show is a roaring success, and catches the attention of a man named Simon Nockman, who has passed himself off as a "professor" of hypnosis, but is truly just a criminal. He theorizes Molly must have obtained the book and learned hypnosis, and formulates a plan. After one performance of "Stars on Mars", Nockman kidnaps Petula, threatening to kill her if Molly does not comply with his orders, and she cannot hypnotize him because he always wears the anti-hypnotic glasses he bought in Briersville. He orders her to use her talents to steal some rare jewels from a bank for him.

Having no choice, Molly agrees. All goes as planned with the robbery until she finds Rocky, who much to her surprise has also learned hypnosis. He had previously stolen and learned from the missing chapters of Molly's hypnotism book, "Long Distance Hypnosis" and "Voice-Only Hypnosis". He also reveals that he had intended to take Molly with him when he was adopted, but had not been able to hypnotize his parents. Since then, he left them as they were not much fun. Working together, the two successfully pull off the robbery, but later form a plan to return the jewels. Rocky uses his power of voice-only hypnotism to hypnotize Nockman into giving up his life of crime. He then helps Molly return the stolen jewels by placing them in hollow garden gnomes and placing them around the city. However, Molly keeps one diamond, which Petula found in her jacket.

Molly gives her part in "Stars on Mars" back to Davina, and returns home with Rocky. Out of sympathy for the broken man, she takes Nockman with her. Before leaving, they work together to record a commercial, using their hypnotic powers to convince people to be kind to their kids. However, when they return, they find Ms. Adderstone and Edna have disappeared, believing that the children there will be happier without any grownups around to tell them what to do, leaving the orphanage in chaos. The older children, once close, have fought amongst themselves, and the younger children have hidden themselves away upstairs, too scared of the older children and the rats they think are living in the orphanage to venture down into the kitchen. With Nockman's help, Molly and Rocky get the orphanage back into a livable condition, and get the sweet-natured Ms. Trinklebury, the orphanage maid, to run it along with Nockman. The orphanage is renamed 'Happiness House' and the money that Molly earned in New York is used to buy new things and redecorate the orphanage. However, it is implied that Nockman has returned to his old ways as he steals a camera, a lollipop and five pounds from children in the orphanage.

At the end of the book, Molly is mysteriously summoned to the library by the librarian, Lucy Logan. Lucy explains that she is the descendant of Professor Logan, the man who originally wrote the hypnotism book, and is a skilled hypnotist herself. She had purposely hypnotized Molly into finding Professor Logan's hypnotism book and keeping it for a month. Now, Molly has come back to return it.

In an epilogue, it is revealed what happened to Ms. Adderstone and Edna; Ms. Adderstone left to become a pilot, and Edna is now an Italian chef.

== Characters ==
- Molly Moon
- Rocky Scarlet
- Petula the Pug
- Agnes Adderstone
- Edna
- Simon Nockman
- Ms. Trinklebury

=== Minor characters ===
==== The New Yorkers ====
- Rixey Bloomey
- Davina Nuttel (pronounced divin-a)
- Barry Brag
- Mr Snuff

==== Orphanage characters ====
- Hazel Hackersley
- Ruby Azle
- Cynthia Redmon
- Craig Redmon
- Gordon Boils
- Roger Fibbin
- Gerry Oakly
- Gemma Patel
- Jinx
- Mrs. Toadley
- Ms. Trinklebury
- Roxy Ronald McDonald
- Molly moon

== Background ==
Author Georgia Byng completed the book in 2001 while nursing her new-born child. David Heyman, producer of the Harry Potter films, bought the book's film rights in 2002. That same year, HarperCollins bought the rights to publish the book in the United States for a six-figure amount.

== Reception ==
In 2003, 85,945 copies of the book were sold by HarperCollins. In 2004, sales for the book increased to 102,589. The book won the Massachusetts Children's Book Award in 2006.

In a starred review, Publishers Weekly stated the novel "offers delightfully dastardly villains, a sympathetic heroine who lives out every child's dream and plenty of fast-paced action." Terry Miller Shannon from Kidsreads.com, in a positive review, felt that themes of friendship and responsibility added meaning to the story. A reviewer from Kirkus Reviews stated that although "Molly’s solutions to problems are amusing", "[t]he salvation of archetypically evil (and archetypically disgusting) villains is dissatisfying". Susan Rogers, writing in School Library Journal, compared the novel to A Series of Unfortunate Events, stating "Molly Moon's story doesn't match their clever and elegant way with words, but it does have something they lack—a satisfying and very moral ending." Mary Thomas, in CM: An Electronic Reviewing Journal of Canadian Materials for Young People, gave the book two stars out of four, calling the book trite and derivative.

== Film ==
A film based on the book titled Molly Moon and the Incredible Book of Hypnotism was released on April 11, 2015.
