= Girl Meets Boy =

Book by Ali Smith

- First edition with quote from Joyce Carol Oates
- Author: Ali Smith
- Cover artist: Tracey Emin
- Language: English
- Publisher: Canongate Books
- Publication date: 1 Nov 2007
- Publication place: United Kingdom
- Media type: Print & eBook
- Pages: 164
- ISBN: 1-84767-264-7

Girl Meets Boy is a 2007 novel by Scottish author Ali Smith and published by Canongate in the Canongate Myth Series. It was one of the "best books of 2007" according to critics at The Independent.

== Plot ==
A modern-day reinterpretation of Ovid's myth of Iphis, it concerns two sisters, Anthea and Imogen (Midge) living in Inverness. Imogen works in the marketing department of a large company producing bottled water, Anthea is on work experience in the same department but then falls in love with Robin, a genderqueer environmental activist. It also vividly portrays her sister Imogen and her joyful emergence from low self-esteem.

== Cover drawing ==
The cover drawing on the first edition is by Tracey Emin and entitled Self-portrait as a Small Bird.
