= The Penelopiad =

2005 novella by Margaret Atwood

- Book cover of the first Canadian edition
- Author: Margaret Atwood
- Cover artist: Isaac Haft
- Language: English
- Series: Canongate Myth Series
- Genre: Parallel novel, Greek mythology retelling
- Published: 11 October 2005 (Knopf Canada)
- Publication place: Canada
- Media type: Print (hardcover and paperback)
- Pages: 216 pp
- ISBN: 0-676-97418-X
- OCLC: 58054360
- Dewey Decimal: C813/.54 22
- LC Class: PR9199.3.A8 P46 2005

The Penelopiad is a novella by Canadian author Margaret Atwood. It was published in 2005 as part of the first set of books in the Canongate Myth Series where contemporary authors rewrite ancient myths. In The Penelopiad, Penelope reminisces on the events of the Odyssey, life in Hades, Odysseus, Helen of Troy, and her relationships with her parents. A Greek chorus of the twelve maids, who Odysseus believed were disloyal and whom Telemachus hanged, interrupt Penelope's narrative to express their view on events. The maids' interludes use a new genre each time, including a jump-rope rhyme, a lament, an idyll, a ballad, a lecture, a court trial and several types of songs.

The novella's central themes include the effects of story-telling perspectives, double standards between the sexes and the classes, and the fairness of justice. Atwood had previously used characters and storylines from Greek mythology in fiction such as her novel The Robber Bride, short story "The Elysium Lifestyle Mansions'", and poems "Circe: Mud Poems" and "Helen of Troy Does Countertop Dancing." She used Robert Graves' The Greek Myths and E. V. Rieu and D. C. H. Rieu's version of the Odyssey to prepare for this novella.

The book was translated into 28 languages and released simultaneously around the world by 33 publishers. In the Canadian market, it peaked on the best seller lists at number one in Maclean's and number two in The Globe and Mail, but did not place on the New York Times Best Seller List in the American market. Some critics found the writing to be typical of Atwood or even one of her finest works, while others found some aspects, like the chorus of maids, disagreeable.

A theatrical version was co-produced by the Canadian National Arts Centre and the British Royal Shakespeare Company. The play was performed at the Swan Theatre in Stratford-upon-Avon and the National Arts Centre in Ottawa during the summer and fall of 2007 by an all-female cast led by director Josette Bushell-Mingo. In January 2012, the show opened in Toronto at Nightwood Theatre, with an all-female cast led by director Kelly Thornton and starring Megan Follows as Penelope. Thornton reprised the production in January and February 2013.

== Background ==
Publisher Jamie Byng of Canongate Books solicited author Margaret Atwood to write a novella re-telling a classic myth of her choice. Byng explained it would be published simultaneously in several languages as part of an international project called the Canongate Myth Series. Atwood agreed to help the rising young publisher by participating in the project. From her home in Toronto, the 64-year-old author made attempts at writing the Norse creation myth and a Native American story but struggled. After speaking with her British literary agent about canceling her contract, Atwood began thinking about the Odyssey. She had first read it as a teenager and remembered finding the imagery of Penelope's twelve maids being hanged in the denouement disturbing. Atwood believed the roles of Penelope and her maids during Odysseus's absence had been a largely neglected scholarly topic and that she could help address it with this project.

== Plot ==
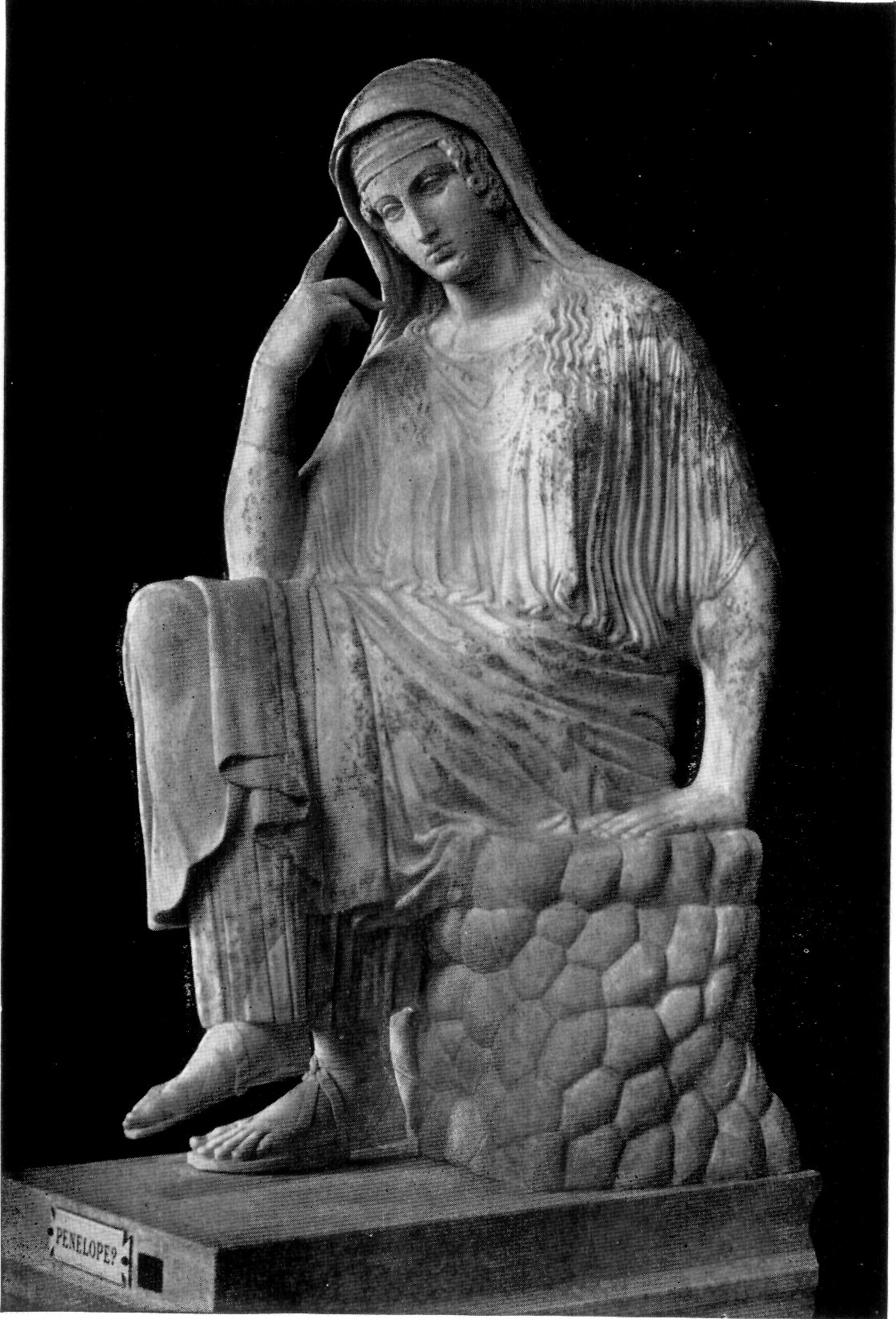
Penelope in the Vatican Museums

The novel recaps Penelope's life in hindsight from 21st-century Hades; she recalls her family life in Sparta, her marriage to Odysseus, her dealing with suitors during his absence, and the aftermath of Odysseus's return. The relationship with her parents was challenging: her father became overly affectionate after attempting to murder her, and her mother was absent-minded and negligent. At fifteen, Penelope married Odysseus, who had rigged the contest that decided which suitor would marry her. Penelope was happy with him, even though he was mocked behind his back by Helen and some maids for his short stature and less-developed home, Ithaca. The couple broke with tradition by moving to the husband's kingdom. In Ithaca, neither Odysseus's mother Anticleia, nor his nurse Eurycleia, liked Penelope but eventually Eurycleia helped Penelope settle into her new role and became friendly, but often patronising.

Shortly after the birth of their son, Telemachus, Odysseus was called to war, leaving Penelope to run the kingdom and raise Telemachus alone. News of the war and rumours of Odysseus's journey back sporadically reached Ithaca and with the growing possibility that Odysseus was not returning an increasing number of suitors moved in to court Penelope. Convinced the suitors were more interested in controlling her kingdom than loving her, she stalled them. The suitors pressured her by consuming and wasting much of the kingdom's resources. She feared violence if she outright denied their offer of marriage so she announced she would make her decision on which to marry once she finished her father-in-law's shroud. She enlisted twelve maids to help her unravel the shroud at night and spy on the suitors. Odysseus eventually returned but in disguise. Penelope recognised him immediately and instructed her maids not to reveal his identity. After the suitors were massacred, Odysseus instructed Telemachus to execute the maids who he believed were in league with them. Twelve were hanged while Penelope slept. Afterwards, Penelope and Odysseus told each other stories of their time apart, but on the issue of the maids Penelope remained silent to avoid the appearance of sympathy for those already judged and condemned as traitors.

No sooner had I performed the familiar ritual and shed the familiar tears than Odysseus himself shambled into the courtyard [...] dressed as a dirty old beggar. [...] I didn't let on I knew. It would have been dangerous for him. Also, if a man takes pride in his disguising skills, it would be a foolish wife who would claim to recognize him: it's always an imprudence to step between a man and the reflection of his own cleverness.

— The Penelopiad, pp. 135–137.

During her narrative, Penelope expresses opinions on several people, addresses historical misconceptions, and comments on life in Hades. She is most critical of Helen whom Penelope blames for ruining her life. Penelope identifies Odysseus's specialty as making people look like fools and wonders why his stories have survived so long, despite being an admitted liar. She dispels the rumour that she slept with Amphinomus and the rumour that she slept with all the suitors and consequently gave birth to Pan.

Between chapters in which Penelope is narrating, the twelve maids speak on topics from their point-of-view. They lament their childhood as slaves with no parents or playtime, sing of freedom, and dream of being princesses. They contrast their lives to Telemachus' and wonder if they would have killed him as a child if they knew he would kill them as a young man. They blame Penelope and Eurycleia for allowing them to unjustly die. In Hades, they haunt both Penelope and Odysseus.

== Style ==
Judge (leafing through book: The Odyssey): It's written here, in this book — a book we must needs consult, as it is the main authority on the subject [...] it says right here — let me see — in Book 22, that the maids were raped. The Suitors raped them. [...] Your client knew all that — he is quoted as having said these things himself. [...] However, your client's times were not our times. Standards of behaviour were different then. It would be unfortunate if this regrettable but minor incident were allowed to stand as a blot on an otherwise exceedingly distinguished career. Also, I do not wish to be guilty of an anachronism. Therefore, I must dismiss the case.

— A court trial acted out by the maids, The Penelopiad, pp. 179–180, 182.

The novella is divided into 29 chapters with introduction, notes, and acknowledgments sections. Structured similarly to a classical Greek drama, the storytelling alternates between Penelope's narrative and the choral commentary of the twelve maids. Penelope narrates 18 chapters with the Chorus contributing 11 chapters dispersed throughout the book. The Chorus uses a new narrative style in each of their chapters, beginning with a jump-rope rhyme and ending in a 17-line iambic dimeter poem. Other narrative styles used by the Chorus include a lament, a folk song, an idyll, a sea shanty, a ballad, a drama, an anthropology lecture, a court trial, and a love song.

Penelope's story uses simple and deliberately naive prose. The tone is described as casual, wandering, and street-wise with Atwood's dry humour and characteristic bittersweet and melancholic feminist voice. The book uses the first-person narrative, though Penelope sometimes addresses the reader through the second person pronoun. One reviewer noted that Penelope is portrayed as "an intelligent woman who knows better than to exhibit her intelligence". Because she contrasts past events as they occurred from her perspective with the elaborations of Odysseus and with what is recorded in myths today, she is described as a metafictional narrator.

== Major themes ==
=== Perspectives ===
The novella illustrates the differences perspectives can make. The stories told in the Odyssey by Nestor and Menelaus to Telemachus, and Odysseus to a Scherian court make Odysseus into a hero as he fights monsters and seduces goddesses. According to Penelope in The Penelopiad, Odysseus was a liar who drunkenly fought a one-eyed bartender then boasted it was a giant cannibalistic cyclops. Homer portrays Penelope as loyal, patient, and the ideal wife, as he contrasts her to Clytemnestra who killed Agamemnon upon his return from Troy. In The Penelopiad, Penelope feels compelled to tell her story because she is unsatisfied with Homer's portrayal of her and the other myths about her sleeping with the suitors and giving birth to Pan. She rejects the role of the ideal wife and admits she was just trying to survive. The Odyssey makes the maids into traitors who consort with the suitors. From the maids' perspective, they were innocent victims, used by Penelope to spy, raped and abused by the suitors, and then murdered by Odysseus and Telemachus. Atwood shows the truth occupies a third position between the myths and the biased points of view.

=== Feminism and double standards ===
The book has been called "feminist", and more specifically "vintage Atwood-feminist", but Atwood disagrees, saying, "I wouldn't even call it feminist. Every time you write something from the point of view of a woman, people say that it's feminist." The Penelopiad's antagonistic relationship between Penelope and Helen is similar to the relationships of women in Atwood's previous novels: Elaine and Cordelia in Cat's Eye, and Iris and Laura in The Blind Assassin, and follows Atwood's doubt of an amicable universal sisterhood. The story does endorse some feminist reassessments of the Odyssey, like Penelope recognizing Odysseus while disguised and that the geese slaughtered by the eagle in Penelope's dream were her maids and not the suitors. Using the maids' lecture on anthropology, Atwood satirizes Robert Graves' theory of a matriarchal lunar cult in Greek myth. The lecture makes a series of connections, concluding that the rape and execution of the maids by men represent the overthrow of the matriarchal society in favor of patriarchy. The lecture ends with lines from anthropologist Claude Lévi-Strauss' Elementary Structures of Kinship: "Consider us pure symbol. We're no more real than money."

Double standards between genders and classes are exposed throughout the novella. Odysseus commits adultery with Circe while expecting Penelope to remain loyal to him. The maids' relations with the suitors are seen as treasonous and earn them an execution. Penelope condemns Helen for her involvement in getting men killed at Troy. At the same time, Penelope excuses her involvement in getting the maids killed even though, as Atwood reveals, Penelope enlisted the maids to spy on the suitors and even encouraged them to continue after some were raped.

=== Narrative justice ===
Penelope's story is an attempt at narrative justice to retribute Helen for her erroneously idealised image in the Odyssey as the archetypal female. Penelope acts like a judicial arbiter, a position she held in Ithaca as the head of state and, during Odysseus' absence, as head of the household. The ancient form of justice and punishment, which was swift and simple due to the lack of courts, prisons, and currency, is tempered by more modern concepts of balanced distributions of social benefits and burdens. Penelope's chosen form of punishment for Helen is to correct the historical records with her own bias by portraying her as vain and superficial, as someone who measures her worth by the number of men who died fighting for her.

The maids deliver their version of narrative justice on Odysseus and Telemachus, who ordered and carried out their execution, and on Penelope who was complicit in their killing. The maids do not have the same sanctioned voice as Penelope and are relegated to unauthoritative genres, though their persistence eventually leads to more valued cultural forms. Their testimony, contrasted with Penelope's excuses while condemning Helen, demonstrates the tendency of judicial processes to not act upon the whole truth. When compared with the historical record, dominated by the stories in the Odyssey, the conclusion, as one academic states, is that the concepts of justice and penalties are established by "who has the power to say who is punished, whose ideas count", and that "justice is underwritten by social inequalities and inequitable power dynamics".

== Influences ==
[...] myths cannot really be translated with any accuracy from their native soil — from their own place and time. We will never know exactly what they meant to their ancient audiences.

— Margaret Atwood, "The Myths Series and Me" in Publishers Weekly.

Atwood's use of myths follows archetypal literary criticism and specifically the work of Northrop Frye and his Anatomy of Criticism. According to this literary theory, contemporary works are not independent but are part of an underlying pattern that re-invents and adapts a finite number of timeless concepts and structures of meaning. In The Penelopiad, Atwood re-writes archetypes of female passivity and victimization while using contemporary ideas of justice and a variety of genres.

The edition of the Odyssey that Atwood read was the E. V. Rieu and D. C. H. Rieu's translation. For research she consulted Robert Graves' The Greek Myths. Graves, an adherent to Samuel Butler's theory that the Odyssey was written by a woman, also wrote The White Goddess, which formed the basis of the Maid's anthropology lecture.

Atwood seems to have been unaware of A. D. Hope's earlier intense moral questioning of the story of Odysseus hanging the maids. In Hope's 1960s poem "The End of the Journey" Penelope and Odysseus pass an unhappy night after the slaughter of the suitors and the maids, and wake to a scene of horror: "Each with her broken neck, each with a blank,/Small strangled face, the dead girls in a row /Swung as the cold airs moved them to and fro".

Atwood had previously written using themes and characters from ancient Greek myths. She wrote a short story in Ovid Metamorphosed called The Elysium Lifestyle Mansions, re-telling a myth with Apollo and the immortal prophet the Sibyl, from the perspective of the Sibyl living in the modern age. Her 1993 novel The Robber Bride roughly parallels the Iliad but is set in Toronto. In that novel the characters Tony and Zenia share the same animosity and competition as Penelope and Helen in The Penelopiad. Her poem "Circe: Mud Poems", published in 1976, casts doubt on Penelope's honourable image:

She's up to something, she's weaving
histories, they are never right,
she has to do them over,
she is weaving her version[...]

Atwood published "Helen of Troy Does Counter Dancing" in her 1996 collection Morning in the Burned House in which Helen appears in a contemporary setting as an erotic dancer and justifies her exploitation as men fantasize over her:

You think I'm not a goddess?
Try me.
This is a torch song.
Touch me and you'll burn.

== Publication ==
The hardcover version of The Penelopiad was published on 21 October 2005 as a part of the launch of Canongate Myth Series, which also included A History of Myth by Karen Armstrong and a third title chosen by each publisher (most chose Weight by Jeanette Winterson). The Penelopiad was translated into 28 languages and released simultaneously around the world by 33 publishers, including Canongate Books in the UK, Knopf in Canada, Grove/Atlantic Inc. in the US, and Text Publishing in Australia and New Zealand. The French translation was published in Canada by Éditions du Boréal and in France by Groupe Flammarion. The trade paperback was released in 2006. Laural Merlington narrated the 3-hour unabridged audiobook which was published by Brilliance Audio and released alongside the hardcover. Merlington's narration was positively received, though sometimes upstaged by the unnamed actresses voicing the maids.

== Reception ==
On best seller lists in the Canadian market, the hardcover peaked at number one in Maclean's and number two in The Globe and Mail in the fiction category. In the American market the book did not place on the New York Times Best Seller list but was listed as an "Editors' Choice". The book was nominated for the 2006 Mythopoeic Fantasy Award for Adult Literature and long-listed for the 2007 International Dublin Literary Award. The book's French translation was nominated at the 2006 Governor General's Literary Awards for best English to French translation.

Some reviewers like Christopher Tayler and David Flusfeder, both writing for The Daily Telegraph, praised the book as "enjoyable [and] intelligent" with "Atwood at her finest". Robert Wiersema echoed that sentiment, adding that the book shows Atwood as "fierce and ambitious, clever and thoughtful". The review in the National Post called the book "a brilliant tour de force". Specifically singled out as being good are the book's wit, rhythm, structure, and story. Mary Beard found the book to be "brilliant" except for the chapter entitled "An Anthropology Lecture" which she called "complete rubbish". Others criticised the book as being "merely a riff on a better story that comes dangerously close to being a spoof" and saying it "does not fare well [as a] colloquial feminist retelling". Specifically, the scenes with the chorus of maidservants are said to be "mere outlines of characters" with Elizabeth Hand writing in The Washington Post that they have "the air of a failed Monty Python sketch". In the journal English Studies, Odin Dekkers and L. R. Leavis described the book as "a piece of deliberate self-indulgence" that reads like "over-the-top W. S. Gilbert", comparing it to Wendy Cope's limericks reducing T. S. Eliot's The Waste Land to five lines.

== Theatrical adaptation ==
Following a successful dramatic reading directed by Phyllida Lloyd at St James's Church, Piccadilly on 26 October 2005, Atwood finished a draft theatrical script. Peter Hinton-Davis, then Artistic Director of the National Arts Centre, and Michael Boyd (director), Artistic Director of the Royal Shakespeare Company, were instrumental in bringing the international collaboration to fruition. Funding was raised mostly from nine Canadian women, dubbed the "Penelope Circle", who each donated $50,000 to the National Arts Centre. An all-female cast was selected consisting of seven Canadian and six British actors, with Josette Bushell-Mingo directing and Veronica Tennant as the choreographer. For music a trio, consisting of percussions, keyboard, and cello, were positioned above the stage. They assembled in Stratford-upon-Avon and rehearsed in June and July 2007. The 100-minute play was staged at the Swan Theatre between 27 July and 18 August at the National Arts Centre in Ottawa between 17 September and 6 October. Atwood's script gave little stage direction allowing Bushell-Mingo to develop the action. Critics in both countries lauded Penny Downie's performance as Penelope, but found the play had too much narration of story rather than dramatisation. Adjustments made between productions resulted in the Canadian performance having emotional depth that was lacking in Bushell-Mingo's direction of the twelve maids. The play subsequently had runs in Vancouver at the Stanley Industrial Alliance Stage between October 26 and November 20, 2011, and in Toronto, produced by the Nightwood Theatre and staged at Buddies in Bad Times Theatre between January 10–29, 2012. The Nightwood Theatre show was directed by Kelly Thornton with choreography by Monica Dottor and starring Megan Follows. A review in The Globe and Mail gave the play 3.5 of 4 stars.

== See also ==
- Lavinia (novel) – first-person treatment of a minor character from the Aeneid, by Ursula Le Guin
- Return to Ithaca (novel) – treatment of The Odyssey with both Penelope's and Odysseus's viewpoints by Eyvind Johnson
