= The Helmet of Horror =

Novel by Victor Pelevin

- Author: Victor Pelevin
- Language: Russian
- Genre: Novel
- Publication date: 2005
- Publication place: Russia
- Media type: Print (Paperback)
- Pages: 288 pp
- ISBN: 184195912X

The Helmet of Horror (Russian: «Шлем ужаса: Креатифф о Тесее и Минотавре») is a novel by Victor Pelevin first published in 2005. The novel consists of 6 chapters, and was commissioned by the British publisher Canongate as part of the international Canongate Myth Series.

== Plot ==
The genre of this work is a piece written in the form of a chat between the characters. But in Pelevin's production, on his site, it is listed in the novel category, and several articles on the subject also use the name novel. But some critics refer to the work as a play genre, or as a dramatic narrative.

Eight characters are participants in a very strange chat. Each of them, in an unknown way, finds himself in one of the very similar rooms with a keyboard and a computer. Soon they understand that they have become participants in the myth of Theseus and the Minotaur. But the situation is much more complex than it seems at first glance.

Each character has his or her own labyrinth behind the door of his or her room.

== Analysis ==
Pelevin's play describes what happens before the birth of a person, it becomes clear what the parts of the personality are doing: they are naturally attracted to each other, trying to bring to life a new personality in which they will all unite. This identity is Theseus, whose necessity the characters talk about throughout the play: his appearance must coincide with their exit from the labyrinth. At the end of the play, Theseus appears for a moment, but immediately disintegrates again. Thus, Pelevin describes a joyous event for the Buddhist: the birth of an enlightened man.

With this interpretation, the seemingly contradictory behavior of the characters also becomes understandable. Why do some of them throughout the play express ideas close to Buddhism (Ariane, Sartrinet), while others rebuke them for it or try to stop them (UGLI 666, IsoldA)? Apparently Ariadne and Sartrinet retain the fragmented memory that in a past life this person sought enlightenment, while UGLI 666 and IsoldA express the simple egoistic desire of parts of the personality to continue to exist forever within an ever reborn structure.

Thus, the Buddhist interpretation of this text appears to be the most natural and consistent. Both of the myths stated in the title are rejected: Pelevin's helmet is able to generate terror not in those around him but in the person who might wear it—and remains unworn, while Pelevin's Theseus refuses to walk the labyrinth and does not take Ariadne with him.

It may be noted that despite the presence of Buddhist motifs in Pelevin's other books, Helmet of Terror is probably his only text in which enlightenment is presented as closely as possible to the way it is understood in classical Buddhism.

In almost all of the previous texts the transformation of the hero was more akin to symbolic death and rebirth than to enlightenment. This rebirth (as the Buddhists put it, "in accordance with the accumulated merits") took place either in a more romantic and spiritual world or, on the contrary, in a world that was extremely unpleasant and uncomfortable. Pelevin experimented with inner dialogue in The Life of Insects: In this novel, two characters (Dima and Mitya) have long philosophical dialogues with each other and gradually merge, turning out to be different parts of one soul; this merger is exactly the opposite of what, according to Buddhism, should happen to the parts of the personality at enlightenment.

In classical fantasy literature, the mind of the hero moves from one body to another or several personalities collide in one body. However, as a rule, if the text describes how the mind disintegrates into parts, these parts are unequal: one of them is more representative of the hero's ego than all the others.

A rare example that comes close to what happens in "Helmet of Horror" is the ironic "Journey of the Seventh" from Stanislaw Lem's "The Star Diaries": the author constructs this story in such a way that it is impossible in principle to say that of the many Ions who appear in this text, one is more real than the others.

"Helmet of Horror" is very important in Russian literature because this work presents a Buddhist picture of the world in the absence of Buddhist heroes (or preacher heroes) or specifically Buddhist environments.

For several decades after the Silver Age of Russian Poetry, Russian religious-mystical fiction was in crisis. After it revived, and until today, it is dominated by two types of stories: the return of the characters to Christianity or the appeal to pagan or New Age teachings, in which all teachings, from Indian to Native American, may be intermingled. However, Christian themes always remain dominant, which is natural for an Orthodox country.

In Pelevin's books, Buddhism appears not only as a full-fledged worldview (which, moreover, is not reduced to the idea of "if you die, you start over again"), but also as a method of literary writing. This becomes especially clear in the play-novel Helmet of Horror.
