= Christopher Bland =

British businessman (1938–2017)

Sir Christopher Bland
- Born: Francis Christopher Buchan Bland; 29 May 1938; Yokohama, Empire of Japan
- Died: 28 January 2017 (aged 78); Clanville, Hampshire, England
- Education: Sedbergh School, Cumbria; The Queen's College, Oxford
- Occupations: Chairman; administrator; author
- Family: Father of Archie Bland; husband of Lady Bland; stepfather of Georgia Byng and Jamie Byng

Sir Francis Christopher Buchan Bland (29 May 1938 – 28 January 2017) was a British businessman and politician. He was deputy chairman of the Independent Television Authority (1972), which was renamed the Independent Broadcasting Authority in the same year, and chairman of London Weekend Television (1984) and of the Board of Governors of the BBC (1996 to 2001), when he took up a position as chairman of British Telecommunications plc (BT). He left his position with BT in September 2007. Before leaving BT, he became chairman of the Royal Shakespeare Company, in 2004.

Bland held many concurrent chairmanships and directorships, including chairman of Century Hutchinson Group (1984), the Edinburgh-based Canongate Publishing, the National Freight Corporation, known as NFC PLC (1994), and Life Sciences International PLC (1987), and Directorship of National Provident (1978), and Storehouse PLC (1988) among others.

Bland had a long-standing interest in the cultivation of wine, and in 1995 bought a 19th-century house with a large wine cellar containing numbered alcoves to accommodate 1,000 bottles of Bordeaux, 100 bottles of Champagne, and 120 bins of white Burgundy. Two years later, he bought a small vineyard next to his home in Gascony in France, planting Cabernet Sauvignon and Merlot, producing about 1,000 litres a year. He was chairman of Leiths School of Food and Wine, which he bought jointly with Caroline Waldegrave in 1994.

== Early life and education ==
Bland was born in Yokohama, Japan, where he lived for his first two years. His father worked for Shell and moved around the world; Bland and his younger brother were largely brought up by relatives in Northern Ireland.

Bland was educated at Sedbergh School, a boarding independent school for boys (now co-educational) in Cumbria in North West England and The Queen's College at the University of Oxford. While at Oxford he was a member of the Irish Olympic fencing team in 1960; he captained the Oxford University Fencing and modern pentathlon teams. Bland spent his National Service with the 5th Royal Inniskilling Dragoon Guards and afterwards became involved in Conservative Party politics.

== Life and career ==
Together with Christopher Brocklebank-Fowler, he wrote a pamphlet in 1964 on immigration, urging fewer controls over entry and more effort to integrate immigrant communities. He worked as a management consultant with Booz Allen Hamilton.

Bland was elected as a member of the Greater London Council (GLC) for Lewisham from 1967, and later became Chairman of the Schools committee of the ILEA. He was elected chairman of the Bow Group think tank on 10 April 1969 to 1970 and also edited its magazine Crossbow. With his business career demanding more time, he stood down from the GLC at the 1970 election.

During the 1970s, Bland ran the construction and engineering firm Beyer Peacock and printers Sir Joseph Causton & Sons. On 29 June 1972, it was announced that he was to become deputy chairman of the Independent Television Authority – later the Independent Broadcasting Authority (IBA) – for a term from 1 July 1972 to 31 July 1976. Shortly afterwards, he moved from Booz Allen Hamilton to First National Finance Corporation (1973–74). Bland retained his involvement in politics and was critical of changes made by Margaret Thatcher to Conservative Central Office staff shortly after her election as Leader in 1975. In 1976, he put his name to a supporting statement issued by the National Campaign for Electoral Reform. He was given a second four-year term at the IBA from 1976 to 1980.

In 1981, Bland married Jennifer Mary Denise May, now known as Lady Bland (from 1963 to 1981 married to Viscount Enfield, when she was titled Lady Enfield), and the daughter of William May, the former Ulster Unionist Party MP for the Ards constituency in County Down, and Minister for Education for Northern Ireland in the 1950s. The Bland family, consisting of the couple, their son, Archie Bland, and four stepchildren, lived at Abbots Worthy House, the home of Lady Bland and her former husband, later the Earl of Strafford, in the village of Abbots Worthy in Hampshire, with a London flat in Catherine Place, near St James's Park, moving their main residence to Blissamore Hall in the village of Clanville near Andover (also in Hampshire), in 1998.

From 1 January 1982, Bland joined the board of LWT (Holdings) and on 1 January 1984 succeeded John Freeman as chairman of the main board of LWT. He was a director of ITN and GMTV, and Chairman of Century Hutchinson, then an LWT subsidiary. When, after the 1993 franchise renewal, LWT was taken over by Granada in a hotly contested hostile bid, Bland became a millionaire.

From 1982 to 1994, Bland was chairman of the Hammersmith and Queen Charlotte's Hospitals NHS special health authority, subsequently chairing Hammersmith Hospitals NHS Trust, including Charing Cross Hospital, from 1994 to February 1997. He was knighted for his work in the National Health Service in 1993. He was chairman of the BBC's board of governors between 1996 and 2001. He was chairman of the Royal Shakespeare Company between 2004 and 2011, during which time the Royal Shakespeare Theatre in Stratford upon Avon was rebuilt at a cost of around £113 million. Bland held other public sector roles: as chairman of the Private Finance Panel from 1995 to 1996, and as a member of the Prime Minister's Advisory Panel on the Citizen's Charter.

Bland was chairman of the BT Board from 1 May 2001 and until September 2007. He was a former senior adviser at Warburg Pincus (a private equity firm), chairman and a substantial shareholder in Canongate Press and Leiths School of Food and Wine, and was appointed chairman of the Royal Shakespeare Company in April 2004. Bland set about "his greatest extravagance: Buying books and anything by Eric Gill, the 20th-century British painter and sculptor".

Bland's first novel, Ashes in the Wind, was published by Head of Zeus in September 2014, when Bland was aged 76. His second novel, Cathar, has been characterised as "look[ing] mortality straight in the eye, with humanity, grace and courage", and was described by the Historical Novel Society as "a fast-moving, well-told, and honest novel". Bland also wrote a play, The Easter Rising and Thereafter, which was staged at London's Jermyn Street Theatre in 2016.

== Personal life ==
Bland was the father of print journalist and former deputy editor of The Independent newspaper, Archie Bland, and from 1981 became stepfather to four children, who include the 9th Earl of Strafford, the author Lady Georgia Byng, and the managing director of the Edinburgh-based publishing house Canongate Books, Jamie Byng, following his wife's earlier marriage to Viscount Enfield (1963–1981).

== Death and legacy ==
Bland's death, at the age of 78, was announced by his son Archie on Twitter on 28 January 2017. He had been suffering from prostate cancer.

Named in his honour, the RSL Christopher Bland Prize was launched in 2018 by the Royal Society of Literature to encourage the work of older writers and awarded annually to an author of a fiction or non-fiction book who was first published when aged 50 or over.

Media offices
Preceded by The Lord Hussey of North Bradley	Chairman of the BBC Board of Governors; 1996–2001	Succeeded by Gavyn Davies
Business positions
Preceded by Iain Vallance	Chairman of BT; 2001–2007	Succeeded by Sir Michael Rake
