= Capstick's Law =

1989 British television drama series

- Genre: Drama
- Starring: William Gaunt; Wanda Ventham; Christopher Villiers; Guy Scantlebury; Jason Carter; Lesley Dunlop; Robin Ellis; Georgia Byng
- Country of origin: United Kingdom
- Original language: English
- No. of series: 1
- No. of episodes: 6

Production
- Executive producer: June Howson
- Producer: Roderick Graham
- Production locations: Giggleswick, North Yorkshire, England, UK
- Running time: 50 minutes
- Production company: Granada Television

Original release
- Network: ITV
- Release: 9 April – 14 May 1989

Capstick's Law is a British television drama series that originally aired between 9 April and 14 May 1989. Produced by Granada Television for the ITV network, it centred on a firm of solicitors in the 1950s. The period drama used Russell Harty's old house in the village of Giggleswick, North Yorkshire, for filming.

== Premise ==
Edward and Madge Capstick are a happily married solicitor and his wife. The eldest son, Jonty, has just started his own practice. Their youngest son, Tony, is articled in London. It is May 1953. Eight years have passed since the Second World War ended, but changes in society are appearing and the pace of change is threatening family life too.

== Cast ==
- William Gaunt as Edward Capstick
- Wanda Ventham as Madge Capstick
- Robin Ellis as Henry Capstick
- Christopher Villiers as Jonty Capstick
- Jason Carter as Timothy Harger
- Georgia Byng as Vicky Colnay
- Gordon Gostelow as Posh Mitton
- Lesley Dunlop as Sarah Harger
- Nick Stringer as Birtles
- Simon Cowell-Parker as Ralph Ashton
- Madge Hindle as Mrs Birtles
- Cyd Hayman as Lizette Colnay
- Guy Scantlebury as Anthony Capstick
- Bryan Pringle as Geoff Turnbull
- Mary Healey as Myra Turnbull
- Phyllis Calvert as Rachel Wilson
- Liz Fraser as Florence Smith
- Jackie Shinn as Posh's crony
- Marlene Sidaway as Peggy
- Geoffrey Leesley as Arnold Mapeley
- Helen Anderson as Jess Birkett
- David Roper as Harry Clifton
- Lynda Rooke as Mrs Clifton
- James Warrior as chairman
- Bernard Kay as Birkett
- William Ivory as Ramsden
- David Fleeshman as Stanton
- Clive Wood as Roger Maitland
- Rachel James as Judy Maitland
- Patsy Rowlands as Miss Foster
- Janet Henfrey as Miss Price
- June Ellis as Mrs Webley
- Paul Chapman as Gilbert Clegg
- Paul Ratcliffe as Harry
- Helen Howard as Lynne
- Frances Cox as landlady
- Tommy Boyle as Jack Collins
- Julie-Kate Olivier as Pat Schofield
- Michael Hughes as Supt Meadows
- Martin Benson as maitre d'hôtel
