= Thomas Byng, 8th Earl of Strafford =

Thomas Edmund Byng, 8th Earl of Strafford (26 September 1936 – 12 November 2016) was a British peer, a member of the House of Lords from 1984 until 1999.

The son of the 7th Earl by his first wife, Maria Magdalena Elizabeth Cloete, he was educated at Eton College and Clare College, Cambridge, then was commissioned as a Lieutenant into the Royal Sussex Regiment.

He married firstly, on 2 August 1963, Jennifer Mary Denise May, daughter of William Morrison May MP, and they had two sons and two daughters, the elder of whom is Lady Georgia Byng. They were divorced in 1981 and on 30 May 1981 he married secondly Julia Mary Howard, the daughter of Sir Dennis Pilcher, formerly married to Derek Howard.

He succeeded as Earl of Strafford, Viscount Enfield, and Baron Strafford of Harmondsworth, on 4 March 1984.

Strafford's younger son, the publisher Jamie Byng, has described his childhood in Abbots Worthy, Hampshire, living in a large but dilapidated house which the family could barely afford to live in. Strafford worked as a gardener at a local nursery and later became a river-keeper on the River Itchen. He was "as un-earl-like a person as you could imagine".

Strafford was succeeded by his elder son, William Robert Byng, Viscount Enfield.
