= Ian Burgham =

Canadian poet

Ian Burgham (born 1950 in Auckland, New Zealand) is a poet. He is the son of Lt. Cmdr. Allen Russell Burgham, DSC, MiD, CD. and Jean Wallace. He has lived in New Zealand and Scotland, but currently resides in Canada. He spent his formative years in Kingston, Ontario and graduated from Queen's Universityin 1972. While at Queen's he studied poetry and poetic process with Professor George Whalley, poet, writer and well-known Coleridge scholar. In 1973, Burgham moved to New Zealand where he taught at Wellington College (New Zealand). In 1975 he moved to Scotland to attend Edinburgh University, taking an M. Litt. degree in Blake studies. His thesis, written under the supervision of Professor Michael Phillips, focussed on William Blake's theory of imagination and the origins of Blake's poetry and theories.

== History ==
Burgham, a member of Canada's The League of Canadian Poets, worked in Edinburgh with the publishing company Canongate Publishing as a book salesman and an editor. During his two years at Canongate, he assisted Stephanie Wolfe Murray and Charles Wyld in the development of their list of authors which included Iain Crichton Smith, Sorley MacLean, Andrew Greig, Lady Naomi Mitchison, Harry Horse, Robin Jenkins, Alasdair Gray and Alastair Reid.

In 1980 Burgham became Publishing Manager of Macdonald Publishers of Loanhead. He worked with the publisher and literary icon, Callum Macdonald and founder of Lines Review. With Macdonald, Ian Burgham published the work of Robert Garioch, Iain Crichton Smith, Nigel Tranter, Alexander McCall Smith and others, and re-released out-of-print novels from authors such as Eric Linklater and John Buchan.

In 1982 Burgham returned to Canada to pursue a career in general list, business and medical publishing. He co-founded the publishing company Grosvenor House Press and later became a partner in an international healthcare communications, medical education agency. Later after assisting Dr. Walter Rosser, OC in the formation of the Centre for Effective Practice within the Department of Family and Community Medicine at the University of Toronto Burgham began work as an adjunct assistant professor in the Centre for Studies in Primary Care at Queen's University. He resigned that position in 2012 to work with Dr Fred Tudiver in establishing the International Centre for Evidence-Based Medicine, Canada.

For a short time he helped to promote the Griffin Prize for Poetry to international markets. Burgham also collaborated with artist Uno Hoffmann in 2011. Up until 2012 Burgham volunteered as a director of the Rowers' Pub Reading Series, one of Ontario's foremost literary venues for readings by recognized writers and poets. The Reading Series has been in operation since 2008.

Burgham has published six poetry collections; A Confession of Birds, The Stone Skippers (Tightrope Books), The Grammar of Distance (Tightrope Books), The Unquiet (Quattro Books), and Midnight (Quattro Books and MacLean Dubois of Edinburgh), the Sophia Poems (LyricalMyrical Press, Toronto). His poems continue to appear in literary journals and anthologies. Journals in which his work has appeared include; the "Literary Review of Canada", "Queen's Quarterly", "Precipice", dANDdelion, "Harpweaver", "Prairie Fire", "Jones Avenue", "Contemporary Verse2" (CV2), "The New Quarterly", "Ascent Aspirations", the Dalhousie Review, Northern Poetry Review, the Toronto Quarterly, ARC Magazine, Five Bells Review, (AUS), Gutter Magazine (UK) and others.

In 2012 he moved to Quattro Books of Toronto. His first collection under the Quattro Books imprint, FourPoints Editions The Unquiet was edited by A. F. Moritz and Allan Briesmaster and was published in November 2012. His second work under the imprint of Quattro Books, "Midnight" was published in 2015.

In the summer of 2012 he read with Scottish poet Douglas Dunn OBE, at the Edinburgh Festival and with Todd Swift. A. F. Moritz, and Catherine Graham at Canada House in London, England. In 2015 Burgham was part of a poetry tour of the UK comprising Canadian poets Catherine Graham, Jeanette Lynes, Stephen Heighton along with Mike Garry of the UK) with readings in Manchester, London, Stratford-upon-Avon, Edinburgh and Glasgow in 2015.

== Plaudits ==
In 2004 he won the Queen's University Well-versed Poetry Award. In that same year, with the support of two principals of MacLean Dubois, Charles MacLean and Alexander McCall Smith, a chapbook, "A Confession of Birds", was published in Edinburgh, Scotland. In 2007, Burgham's first full collection, "The Stone Skippers", (with an introduction by Australian poet Roland Leach) was published in the UK by MacLean Dubois, in Australia and New Zealand by SunLine Press and in Canada by Tightrope Books. These collections were followed by "The Grammar of Distance" in 2010 and "The Unquiet" in 2012. "The Stone Skippers" was nominated for the prestigious ReLit Awardin 2007. A review written by Christina Decarie appeared in the autumn edition (No. 159, 2009) of The Antigonish Review describing "The Stone Skippers":

"This (collection of poems) is hard work, but it is worth it. For always the opening poem, 'The Stone Skippers' is with us. Waking up panicked and rushed with no memory and only a sense of time slipping quickly through our fingers is an easy state to fall into, but it is a miserable one. Facing loss and the spaces it leaves us is painful, dreadful, and has its potential for despair. But it also comes with opportunities, connections and surprises. And this emptiness, in its own way, is full, and the loneliness complete. This collection is a coming to terms with loss, and it leaves us with comfort, not fear. It is a wonderful terrible collection."

A review, written by poet Kevin Gillam, appeared in Five Bells, Journal of the Poets Union of New South Wales:

"‘The Stone Skippers’ by Ian Burgham is a beautifully published hard-back, generously spaced poems on high quality paper. And the work itself in every way continues this attention to detail, employing word and silence in equal measure. Here is a writer capable of great subtlety, fusing the turning point moment of short story, depth and length of novel, ‘in-breath’ of exalted verse. A small ‘I’ captures nature, philosophy, the quiet moment, the fleeting thought, then magnifies and shapes into word. Many poems possess the intimacy of listening in on someone talking to themselves. Use of form, poetic device, economy and choice of language, blurring of fancy and fiction – all are employed with intelligence and readerly insight."

And again

"‘The Stone Skippers’ is a powerful, evocative, ‘real’ reading experience, quotes and de-construction somehow not doing it justice. Burgham demonstrates the dancing quality and length of well crafted poetry, like the skipping stone, well chosen and flung at the precise moment. The poems are to be savoured, lingered over, allowed to resonate and be remembered."

A second critically acclaimed collection of poems, "The Grammar of Distance", edited by poet Catherine Graham, with a Foreword by Jeanette Lynes, was published in 2010 by Tightrope Books, Canada and MacLean Dubois, Scotland.

== Bibliography ==
A Confession of Birds, Chapbook, MacLean Dubois, 2003/4

The Stone Skippers, Tightrope Books, 2007 ISBN 978-0-97386-45-8-8

The Grammar of Distance, Tightrope Books, 2010 ISBN 978-1-926639-09-3

The Unquiet, Fourpoints Editions, Quattro Books, 2012 ISBN 978-1-927443-24-8

Midnight, Quattro Books, 2105 ISBN 978-1-927443-76-7

" Sophia Poems", LyricalMyrical Press, 2015
