= The Fire Gospel =

Michel Faber novel

- First edition
- Author: Michel Faber
- Series: Canongate Myths
- Genre: Satire
- Publisher: Canongate Books
- Publication date: 6 November 2008
- Publication place: United Kingdom
- Media type: Print & eBook
- Pages: 213
- ISBN: 1-84767-279-5
- OCLC: 276306749

The Fire Gospel is a 2008 novel by Michel Faber published by Canongate Books in its Myth Series.

== Summary ==
The Fire Gospel is a reinterpretation of the myth of Prometheus that broadly satirises the publishing industry. The plot centres on an expert in Aramaic, Theo Griepenkerl, who discovers nine papyrus scrolls following the bombing of an Iraqi museum. The scrolls contain the lost gospel of Malchus, a servant who witnessed the Crucifixion of Jesus, and Theo's translation becomes a publishing sensation.
