= The Good Man Jesus and the Scoundrel Christ =

Novel by Philip Pullman

- Author: Philip Pullman
- Publisher: Canongate Books
- Publication date: 2010
- Pages: 245
- ISBN: 978-0-8021-2996-3
- OCLC: 456177369

The Good Man Jesus and the Scoundrel Christ is a novel by Philip Pullman.

Published in 2010 by Canongate Books, as part of the Canongate Myth Series, it retells the story of Jesus as if he were two people, twin brothers "Jesus" and "Christ", with contrasting personalities; Jesus being a moral and godly man, and his brother Christ a calculating figure who wishes to use Jesus' legacy to found a powerful Church.

== Critical reception ==
Pullman's historical understanding has been criticised by Jesuit theologian Gerald O'Collins.

While Christopher Hitchens, author of God Is Not Great, praised Pullman's His Dark Materials, he was more critical of The Good Man Jesus and the Scoundrel Christ, labelling Pullman "a Protestant atheist" for supporting the teachings of Christ but being critical of organised religion.

Diarmaid MacCulloch reviewed the book positively for Literary Review.
