= Martyr Worthy =

Village and parish in Hampshire, England

Coordinates: 51.093330°N 1.26548°W

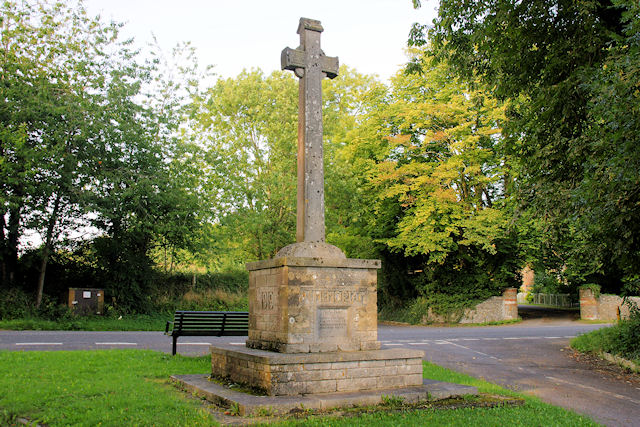
- War memorial in the village

- Location within Hampshire
- Population: 110
- OS grid reference: SU5153532925
- Civil parish: Itchen Valley
- District: Winchester
- Shire county: Hampshire
- Region: South East
- Country: England
- Sovereign state: United Kingdom
- Post town: WINCHESTER
- Postcode district: SO21
- Dialling code: 01962
- Police: Hampshire and Isle of Wight
- Fire: Hampshire and Isle of Wight
- Ambulance: South Central
- UK Parliament: Winchester

Martyr Worthy is a village in the civil parish of Itchen Valley, in the Winchester non-metropolitan district of Hampshire, England. It is part of the Worthys cluster of small villages. In 1931 the parish had a population of 350. On 1 April 1932 the parish was abolished to form Itchen Valley.

Martyr Worthy is located on the banks of the River Itchen to the northeast of the city of Winchester.

The place-name 'Martyr Worthy' is first attested in Episcopal Registers of 1243, where it appears as Wordia le Martre. 'Worthy' means 'enclosure', and Martyr Worthy is recorded as having been held by Henricus la Martre in 1201. 'Martre' may be Old French martre meaning martyr, or meaning marten and used as a nickname.

The village has a Church of England parish church – St Swithun's – which is Grade II* listed.

== Climate ==
Climate data for Martyr Worthy (1991–2020)
Month	Jan	Feb	Mar	Apr	May	Jun	Jul	Aug	Sep	Oct	Nov	Dec	Year
Record high °C (°F)	14.0 (57.2)	16.1 (61.0)	20.0 (68.0)	23.5 (74.3)	27.8 (82.0)	34.0 (93.2)	33.5 (92.3)	34.7 (94.5)	28.3 (82.9)	26.1 (79.0)	18.3 (64.9)	14.8 (58.6)	34.7 (94.5)
Mean daily maximum °C (°F)	7.8 (46.0)	8.4 (47.1)	11.1 (52.0)	14.2 (57.6)	17.8 (64.0)	20.5 (68.9)	22.9 (73.2)	22.6 (72.7)	19.7 (67.5)	15.2 (59.4)	10.9 (51.6)	8.3 (46.9)	15.0 (59.0)
Daily mean °C (°F)	4.7 (40.5)	4.9 (40.8)	6.9 (44.4)	9.2 (48.6)	12.3 (54.1)	15.1 (59.2)	17.2 (63.0)	17.2 (63.0)	14.6 (58.3)	11.3 (52.3)	7.5 (45.5)	5.1 (41.2)	10.5 (50.9)
Mean daily minimum °C (°F)	1.5 (34.7)	1.4 (34.5)	2.7 (36.9)	4.2 (39.6)	6.9 (44.4)	9.6 (49.3)	11.5 (52.7)	11.8 (53.2)	9.5 (49.1)	7.3 (45.1)	4.0 (39.2)	1.9 (35.4)	6.1 (43.0)
Record low °C (°F)	−13.0 (8.6)	−10.7 (12.7)	−9.4 (15.1)	−6.1 (21.0)	−4.1 (24.6)	−0.7 (30.7)	2.8 (37.0)	−0.1 (31.8)	−0.1 (31.8)	−4.7 (23.5)	−8.6 (16.5)	−11.8 (10.8)	−13.0 (8.6)
Average precipitation mm (inches)	81.6 (3.21)	57.6 (2.27)	50.9 (2.00)	50.9 (2.00)	49.2 (1.94)	45.2 (1.78)	52.9 (2.08)	57.8 (2.28)	54.6 (2.15)	86.0 (3.39)	91.4 (3.60)	75.6 (2.98)	753.6 (29.67)
Average precipitation days (≥ 1.0 mm)	12.7	10.2	9.3	9.7	8.6	8.4	9.0	9.0	8.9	11.7	12.9	12.5	123.0
Mean monthly sunshine hours	57.1	80.2	115.8	168.4	199.5	190.6	201.5	186.4	146.7	108.5	69.6	55.2	1,579.3
Source 1: Met Office
Source 2: Starlings Roost Weather
