= Molly Moon Stops the World =

2003 novel by Georgia Byng

- Author: Georgia Byng
- Language: English
- Genre: Children's novel
- Published: 2003 HarperCollins, Macmillan Children's Books
- Publication place: United Kingdom
- Media type: Print (Paperback)
- ISBN: 0-330-41577-8
- OCLC: 52621389
- Preceded by: Molly Moon's Incredible Book of Hypnotism
- Followed by: Molly Moon's Hypnotic Time-Travel Adventure

Molly Moon Stops the World is a 2003 children's novel by British author Georgia Byng. It is the second instalment in the Molly Moon six-book series.

== Premise ==
In Molly Moon Stops the World, Molly Moon is fixing the orphanage with the money she earned in New York City. Davina Nuttel, a famous child actress, and Molly Moon's rival, gets kidnapped by Primo Cell, a powerful leader and rich businessman.

Molly travels to Los Angeles, California and finds out she can stop time, a feat that enables her to stop an evil plot.

== Critical reception and audiobook ==
Several reviewers favoured this book to the previous novel in the series. Publishers Weekly gave the novel a positive review, stating "[a]long with twists and surprises, Byng also works in themes about the pervasiveness of advertising and the influence of celebrity endorsements." Kristi Olson from Kidsreads.com recommended the book especially for Lemony Snicket fans, stating there were many suspenseful twists throughout the story. Mary Thomas from CM: An Electronic Reviewing Journal of Canadian Materials for Young People gave the book a four out of four rating, stating "Molly's world may be unreal, but her friendships and feelings are genuine and add an extra dimension to a book that could otherwise be dismissed as totally fantastic."

An audiobook, read by Clare Higgins, was released in 2004. Lolly Gepson from Booklist stated her reading was magical, commenting that "[s]he is equally adept at sounding like upper-crust snobs and cockney orphans or Hollywood phonies."
