= The Hurricane Party =

2007 novel by Klas Östergren

- First edition
- Author: Klas Östergren
- Original title: Orkanpartyt
- Translator: Tiina Nunnally
- Language: Swedish
- Set in: future
- Published: 2007
- Publisher: Albert Bonniers förlag
- Publication place: Sweden
- English publication date: 2009

The Hurricane Party (Swedish: Orkanpartyt) is the eleventh novel by Swedish author Klas Östergren and was published in 2007. The English translation by Tiina Nunnally was published as part of the Canongate Myth Series in 2009. The novel is a reinterpretation of the Edda story about how Loki insults the Gods and gets his punishment.
