= Salley Vickers =

British novelist (born 1948)

- Born: 1948 (age 77–78); Liverpool, England
- Education: St Paul's Girls' School, Newnham College, Cambridge
- Occupation: Writer
- Writing career
- Genre: Fiction
- Website: www.salleyvickers.com

Salley Vickers (born 1948) is a British novelist whose works include Miss Garnet's Angel, Mr. Golightly's Holiday, The Other Side of You and Where Three Roads Meet, a retelling of the Oedipus myth to Sigmund Freud in the last months of his life. She also writes poetry.

== Early life and education ==
Vickers was born in Liverpool. Her year of birth was thought to be 1948, but an article about her in April 2020 gave her age as 70, which suggests she was born in 1949 or 1950. However, she mentions in a discussion on the 'Confessions' podcast with Giles Fraser that she was a "baby of the National Health Service", and her doctor's first "National Health baby" in 1948. Her mother Freddie, a social worker, and her father, J. O. N. Vickers, a trades union leader, were both members of the Communist Party of Great Britain until 1956. They were friends of J. B. S. Haldane, and T. H. White had taught her father English at school.

Her father was a committed supporter of Irish republicanism, and her first name 'Salley' is spelled with an 'e' because it is the Irish for 'willow' (cognate with Latin: salix, salicis), as in the W B Yeats poem, "Down by the Salley Gardens", a favourite of her parents.

She was brought up in Barleston Hall, Stoke-on-Trent, and in Chiswick where she attended Strand-on-the Green primary school, which she acknowledges as a first-rate state school with superb teachers. She won a state scholarship to St Paul's Girls' School, which caused her father some ideological consternation but her mother was supportive. Whilst at St Paul's, however, her father encouraged her to work to ensure that she experienced working life and society very different from that of her more affluent school peers.

Salley went on to read English Literature at Newnham College, Cambridge.

== Teaching ==
Following university she taught children with special needs. She also taught English literature at Stanford, Oxford and the Open University, specialising in Shakespeare, the 19th-century novel and 20th-century poetry. She was also a WEA and further education tutor for adult education classes. During 2012–13 she was a Royal Literary Fund fellow of her alma mater, Newnham College, Cambridge.

== Psychotherapy ==
After her initial teaching career, she retrained as a Jungian analytical psychotherapist, subsequently working in the NHS. She specialised in helping people who were creatively blocked. She gave up her psychoanalytic work in 2002 because she found "seeing patients" was incompatible with writing novels, although she still lectures on the connections between literature and psychology.

== Writing ==
In 2000 her first novel, Miss Garnet's Angel, was published to word-of-mouth acclaim, and she subsequently became a full-time writer. She widely contributes to newspaper and magazines, and to the BBC.

In 2002, she was a judge for the Booker Prize for Fiction.

In 2011 she contributed a short story, "Why Willows Weep", to an anthology supporting The Woodland Trust. The anthology had helped the Trust plant approximately 50,000 trees. She has also published two volumes of short stories, 'Aphrodite's Hat' and 'The Boy Who Could See Death.'

Recent novels include The Cleaner of Chartres (2012), which considers the plight of unmarried mothers whose children are taken from them; Cousins (2016), which explores the moral dilemmas of assisted suicide, a cause to which Vickers has put her name; The Librarian (2018), which includes biographical information in the author's notes; Grandmothers (2019), which is based on her work as a psychotherapist and which explores intergenerational relationships; and The Gardener, which was published in November 2021.

In The Librarian, Vickers describes Sylvia Townsend Warner as one of her role models.

== Personal life ==
She has two sons from her marriage with Martin Brown. In 2002, her brief second marriage to the Irish writer and broadcaster Frank Delaney ended, and was dissolved "just as her career as an author took off".

In April 2020 she wrote that she hoped to be infected by the COVID-19 virus 'in order to be granted the immunity to return to the world and lend a hand'.

== Fiction ==
- Vickers, Salley (2000). Miss Garnet's Angel. OCLC 799184817.
- Vickers, Salley (2001). Instances of the Number 3. Farrar, Straus and Giroux. ISBN 978-0-374-17702-7.
- Vickers, Salley (2003). Mr Golightly's Holiday. Harper Collins. ISBN 978-0-00-715648-1.
- Vickers, Salley (2006). The Other Side of You. Fourth Estate. ISBN 978-0-00-716544-5.
- Vickers, Salley (2007). Where Three Roads Meet. Canongate. ISBN 978-1-84767-018-2. (part of the Canongate Myth Series)
- Vickers, Salley (2009). Dancing Backwards. Fourth Estate.
- Vickers, Salley (November 2010). Aphrodite's Hat, The Collected Stories of Salley Vickers. Fourth Estate.
- Vickers, Salley (2010). The Indian Child. The Cuckoo Press. ISBN 978-0-954-26889-3. (reprinted from the collection Aphrodite's Hat)
- Vickers, Salley (1 November 2012). The Cleaner of Chartres. Viking. ISBN 978-0670922123.
- Vickers, Salley (3 November 2016). Cousins. Viking. ISBN 978-0241187715.
- Vickers, Salley (26 April 2018). The Librarian. Viking. ISBN 978-0241321737.

A projected non-fiction book about The Book of Common Prayer and entitled Sweet and Comfortable Words was never published.
