= Abbots Worthy =

Village in Hampshire, England

Coordinates: 51.090471°N 1.289549°W

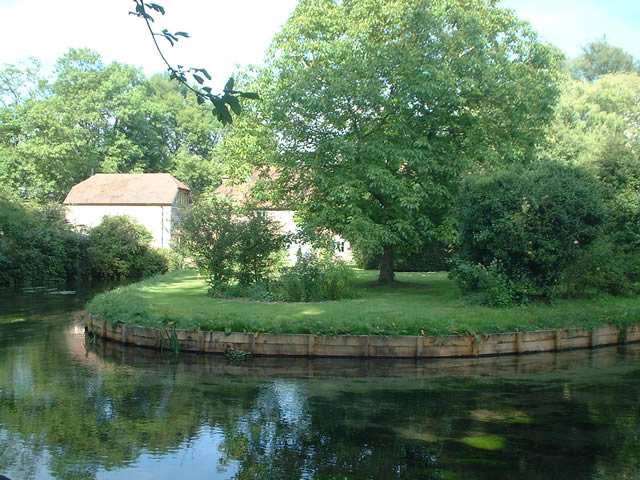
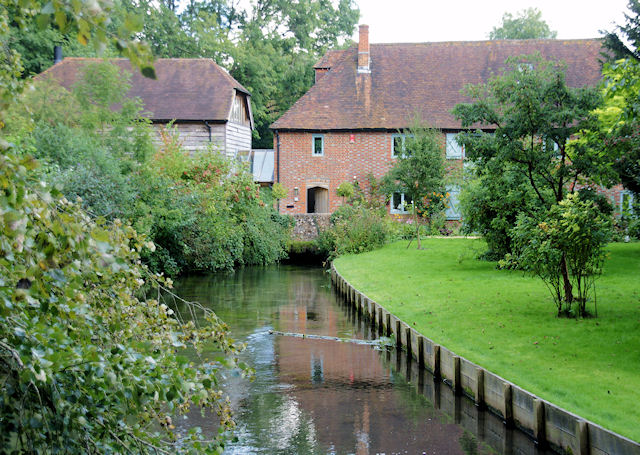
- The old mill in Abbots Worthy

- Location within Hampshire
- OS grid reference: SU497326
- Civil parish: Kings Worthy
- District: City of Winchester
- Shire county: Hampshire
- Region: South East
- Country: England
- Sovereign state: United Kingdom
- Post town: WINCHESTER
- Postcode district: SO21
- Dialling code: 01962
- Police: Hampshire and Isle of Wight
- Fire: Hampshire and Isle of Wight
- Ambulance: South Central
- UK Parliament: Winchester

Abbots Worthy is a small village in the City of Winchester district of Hampshire, England. It is in the civil parish of Kings Worthy.

Abbots Worthy lies on the A33 about 2 miles (3.2 km) to the north of Winchester. Abbots Worthy is included within the civil parish of Kings Worthy and is represented on Winchester City Council as part of The Worthys Ward, and on Hampshire County Council as part of the Itchen Valley division.

The Itchen Way, which is a 31.8-mile (51.2 km) long-distance footpath, passes through the village. The River Itchen lies just to the south of Abbots Worthy.

== History ==
In 1870–72, John Marius Wilson in the Imperial Gazetteer of England and Wales described Abbotts Worthy as:

ABBOTSWORTHY, a tything in the parish of Kings worthy, 2 miles NNE of Winchester, Hants.

The suffix "-worthy" is believed to be derived from the Saxon "wordie", referring to part of an estate or well-defined area. The town's name is also likely a result of it having been granted to the Monks of St Peter’s Abbey in the late 9th century.

== Notable former residents ==
- Archie Bland - Writer, journalist and Deputy Editor of The Independent newspaper
- Sir Christopher Bland - Former Chairman of British Telecom, the BBC and the RSC
- Lady Georgia Byng - Children's author
- The Hon. Jamie Byng - Owner of Canongate Books
- The 8th Earl of Strafford
- Robyn Hitchcock, musician
