= Ragnarok: The End of the Gods =

2011 novel by A. S. Byatt

- Author: A. S. Byatt
- Language: English
- Publisher: Cannongate
- Publication date: 2011
- ISBN: 978-0802120847

Ragnorak: The End of the Gods is a 2011 novel written by English critic and novelist A. S. Byatt. Written for the Canongate Myth Series, Byatt chose to make the book about Norse mythology so she could grapple the "appalling finality" of Ragnarök.

== Critical reception ==
Peter Conrad of The Guardian praised the book, stating that it took "Norse apocalypse Ragnarok and triumphantly forges it anew." Another critic, M. John Harrison, stated that Byatt added "value to the end of everything by adding her own experience of it", stating that "this sense of eternal conflict acts as an anchor." He also noted that Byatt's interwoven additions made the book "a kind of bildungsroman." This, according to him, made it "clever", "lucid", and "lovely".

Paul Binding of The Independent noted that the book presented "a vision of existence so widely reverberant and yet so at variance with the most dominant western Weltanschauungen". He praised Byatt's usage of the second device, stating that it was "brilliantly effective." Binding also noted that the pages on the period of Byatt's life was "surely among the most beautiful and incisive Byatt has ever written." Holly Kyte of The Daily Telegraph also praised the book, stating that it was "a majestic version of the Norse Armageddon".
