= Georgia Byng =

British children's writer (born 1965)

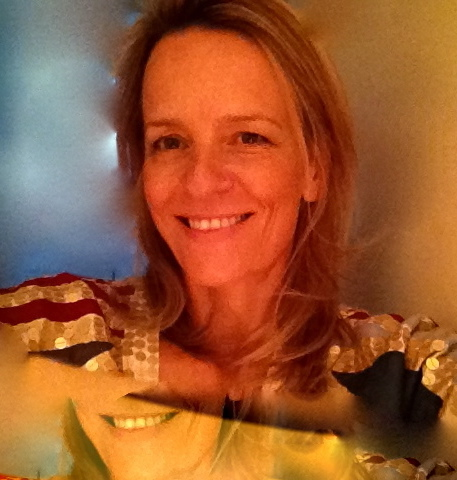
- Byng in 2022
- Born: Georgia Mary Byng (Note: Her birth was registered under her father's courtesy title, Viscount Enfield); 6 September 1965 (age 61); Chelsea, London, England
- Education: Westonbirt School
- Alma mater: Central School of Speech and Drama
- Occupations: Novelist; illustrator; actress; film producer
- Children: 3
- Relatives: Christopher Bland (step-father); Archie Bland (half-brother); Jamie Byng (brother)
- Writing career
- Genres: Children's literature; comic strip
- Notable work: Molly Moon's Incredible Book of Hypnotism (2002)
- Notable awards: Sheffield Children's Book Award; Stockton Children's Book Award; Salford Children's Book Award; Massachusetts Children's Book Award

Lady Georgia Mary Caroline Byng (born 6 September 1965) is a British children's writer, educator, illustrator, actress and film producer. Since 1995, she has published thirteen children's books, and co-written and co-produced one film. Byng has won the Stockton Children's Book Award, the Sheffield Children's Book Award, the Massachusetts Children's Book Award, the Salford Children's Book Award and the Best Kid's Film at the Peace And Love Festival, Sweden. Most of Byng's books are magical realism adventures, with protagonists who overcome self-doubt and become self-empowered. The themes are often bullying and its darkness, kindness and its light, friendship and its warmth, and the power of the mind.

== Early life ==
Georgia Byng was born on 6 September 1965, at her family's home in London, the elder daughter and second child of Thomas Byng, Viscount Enfield (later the 8th Earl of Strafford) and his first wife, Jennifer May (daughter of Irish politician William Morrison May). She grew in Abbots Worthy, near Winchester in Hampshire. She has three brothers and one sister. Byng is the elder sister of Jamie Byng, publisher of Canongate Books. Through her late stepfather, Sir Christopher Bland, Byng is the half-sister of Archie Bland, Guardian writer and sub-editor.

Byng was educated at Princess Mead School and Nethercliffe School, Winchester, then from the age of 12 at Westonbirt School, an independent boarding school for girls in Gloucestershire. She went to Peter Symonds, a sixth-form college in Winchester. From 1984 to 1987, she attended the Central School of Speech and Drama, a constituent college of the University of London in central London.

== Career ==
=== Acting ===
Byng worked as an actress from 1989 to 1990, appearing in the television series Screen Two, Dealers, and Capstick's Law.

=== Writing and illustration ===
Byng's first published book was a comic-strip story that she wrote and illustraited – The Sock Monsters, about the small monsters who live in houses and eat people's socks. She followed this with Jack's Tree, a comic-strip book about a boy who saves a tree from being cut down. Her next book was The Ramsbottom Rumble, a short novel about two boys who save their grandmother from a con man.

Byng's best-known work is Molly Moon's Incredible Book of Hypnotism, a children's novel about a girl who finds a hypnotism book in the library and learns how to hypnotise people. This book was followed by Molly Moon’s Hypnotic Holiday, then Molly Moon Stops the World in which Molly learns how to stop time. In the next book, Molly Moon's Time Travel Adventure, Molly gets the gist of time travelling. In Molly Moon, Micky Minus and the Mind Machine she becomes a mind reader. In Molly Moon and the Morphing Mystery Molly uses her powers to morph into other forms, both people and animals. In the seventh Molly Moon book, Molly Moon and The Monster Music, Molly finds she is able to hypnotise people and animals by playing hypnotic music. Each of the Molly Moon series is set in a different place, from the UK to New York, to Los Angeles, then India (this one in the 19th century) to Switzerland in the future to Ecuador and Japan. Byng co-wrote the screenplay for Molly Moon and the Incredible Book of Hypnotism, the movie of her first book.

After the Molly Moon books came Pancake Face, and The Girl with No Nose, and in January 2023, Albi, the Glowing Cow Boy, an illustrated novel for 8- to 12-year-olds about a calf who eats big white milk mushrooms, then becomes super-intelligent and escapes an abattoir. Like Byng's other books, this book travels across the world. Its protagonist, Albi champions compassion towards other beings and plant-based eating and this being a solution to climate change. Byng is with Caradoc King and Millie Hoskins at London literary agency United Agents.

=== Production ===
In 2015, Byng was the producer for Molly Moon and the Incredible Book of Hypnotism, the film adaptation of her book.

== Personal life ==
Byng married Daniel Chadwick in 1990; they divorced in 1995. They have a daughter.

Byng married artist Marc Quinn. They divorced in 2014. They have two sons.

Byng is now engaged to musician, Guy Pratt.

== Awards ==
- 2003: Sheffield Children's Book Award (for Molly Moon's Incredible Book of Hypnotism)
- 2004: Stockton Children's Book Award (for Molly Moon's Incredible Book of Hypnotism)
- 2004: Salford Children's Book Award (for Molly Moon's Incredible Book of Hypnotism)
- 2006: Massachusetts Children's Book Award (for Molly Moon's Incredible Book of Hypnotism)

== Publications ==
Selected works include:

- The Sock Monsters (Orion Publishing Group, 1995)
- Jack's Tree, illustrated by Lucy Su (A & C Black, 2000)
- The Ramsbottom Rumble, illustrated by Helen Flook (Black, 2001)
- Pancake Face, illustrated by Mike Phillips (Barrington Stoke, 2014)
- The Girl With No Nose, illustrated by Gary Blythe (Barrington Stoke, 2016)
- Albi, The Glowing Cow Boy (UCLan Books, 2023)

=== Molly Moon series ===
1. Molly Moon's Incredible Book of Hypnotism (2002)
2. Molly Moon's Hypnotic Holiday (2003)
3. Molly Moon Stops the World (2004)
4. Molly Moon's Hypnotic Time-Travel Adventure (2005)
5. Molly Moon, Micky Minus and the Mind Machine (2007)
6. Molly Moon and the Morphing Mystery (2010)
7. Molly Moon and the Monster Music (2012)
