= Kings Worthy =

Village and parish in Hampshire, England

Coordinates: 51.087808°N 1.295302°W

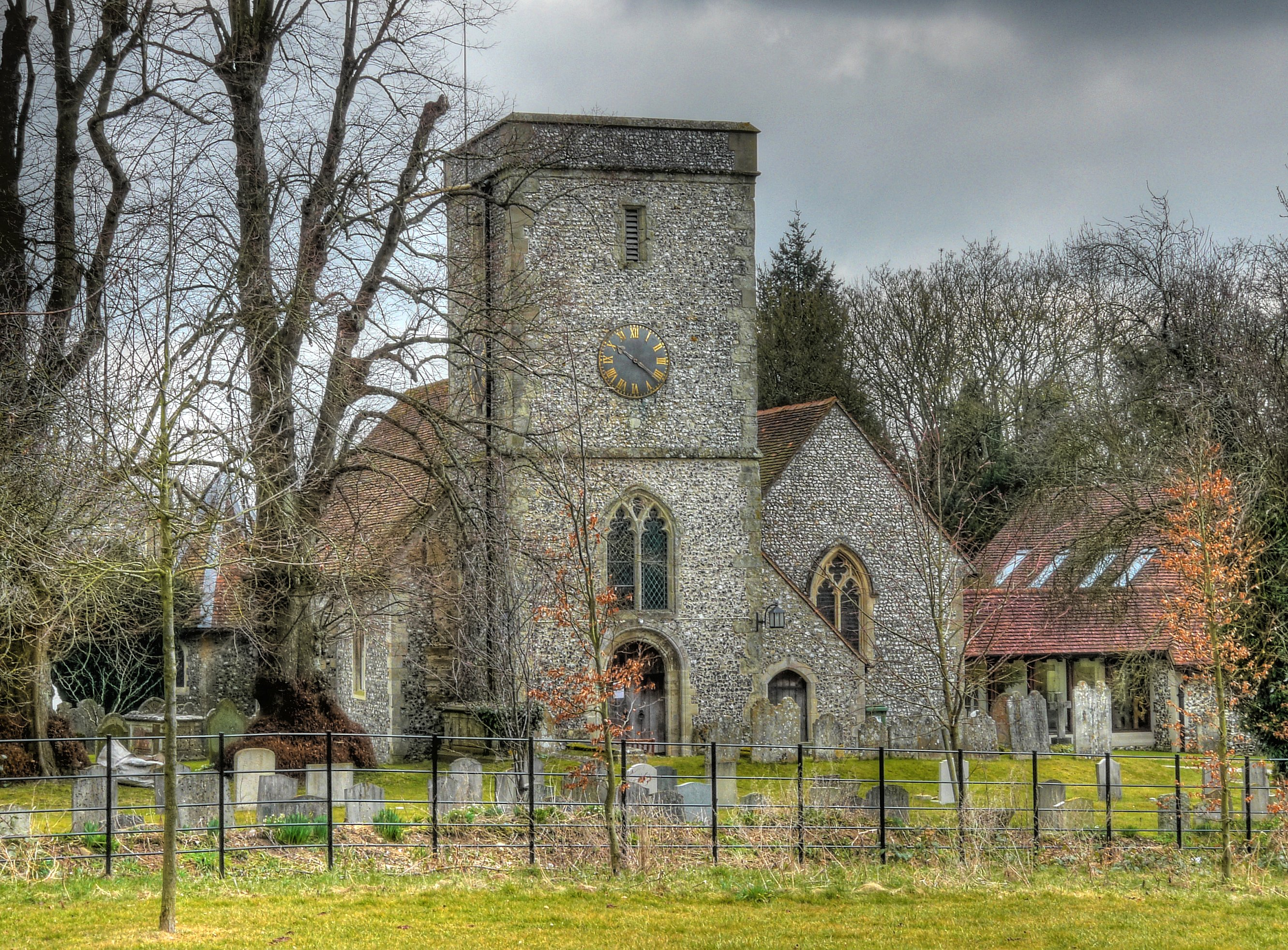
- St Mary's Parish Church

- Location within Hampshire
- Population: 4,000; 4,435 (2011 Census)
- OS grid reference: SU493323
- Civil parish: Kings Worthy
- District: City of Winchester
- Shire county: Hampshire
- Region: South East
- Country: England
- Sovereign state: United Kingdom
- Post town: WINCHESTER
- Postcode district: SO23
- Dialling code: 01962
- Police: Hampshire and Isle of Wight
- Fire: Hampshire and Isle of Wight
- Ambulance: South Central
- UK Parliament: Winchester

Kings Worthy is a village and civil parish in Hampshire, England, approximately two miles north-east of Winchester. Kings Worthy was a tithing of Barton Stacey when the Domesday Book was written.

== St Mary's church ==
The parish church, established in 1185, is found on London Road. A traditional village church, St Mary's caters to a range of worshippers from Anglo-Catholics to those of a more evangelical persuasion. The church is welcoming to families, with a dedicated room for younger children. A highlight of the church calendar is the Festival of Nine Lessons and Carols. This celebration of Christmas follows a traditional format with a wide selection of choir items, congregational carols and readings.

== Education ==
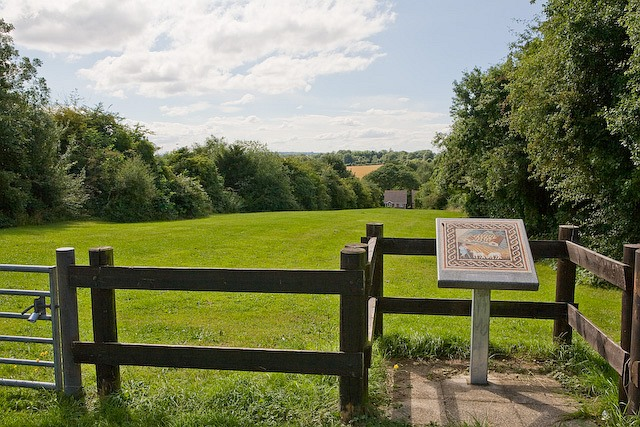
Broadview Recreation Ground

Kings Worthy Primary School

Location
- Church Lane; Kings Worthy; Winchester, Hampshire, SO23 7QS; England

Information
- Established: 1953
- Head teacher: Mr J. Dodson
- Gender: Mixed
- Age: 4 to 11
- Colour: Green
- Website: https://www.kingsworthy.hants.sch.uk/

The primary school is Kings Worthy Primary School. Most pupils from Kings Worthy Primary go on to study at Henry Beaufort School.

Sports within Kings Worthy are limited, however the Worthys Football club were runners up in the 2017 Jack West Cup Final.

=== Primary school ===
Kings Worthy Primary School is a medium-sized school in the heart of Kings Worthy, Winchester, England. It has around 420 pupils and 25 staff. It is a state school for pupils aged from 4–11. At the school, pupils finish by taking their year six SATS exams.

The school was established in 1953. It was originally one of two local schools: the other was in nearby Abbots Worthy. As the school started to grow they bought Hinton House, a Victorian house adjacent to the school site. This was then used to house five classrooms.

In September 2008 Hinton House was sold and work began on a brand new building consisting of five new modern classrooms, as well as purpose-built technology rooms. During this move some of the school grounds were lost, but they still have a wide area including a pond and a big sports field.

Every year the school puts on a Christmas production that involves everyone in the school and each class comes on and does their own little sketch. Every year the show is different but it always links in or around the Christmas story.

== Theatre ==
The Jubilee Hall on London Road is home to The Worthy Players, a amateur dramatics group that has been performing in the village since 1973. The Players have performed pantomimes, comedies, farces, thrillers, music hall, and serious plays among others for over 40 years.

== Transportation ==
The main road (Springvale Road) is fairly busy, and is served by regular buses going to the centre of Winchester. The main bus route serving the village is the number 6 (previously the 'Spring'), and is operated by Stagecoach. The parish is crossed by the A33, which merges with the A34 immediately to the south. Kings Worthy formerly had a station on the Didcot, Newbury and Southampton Railway. It was by-passed to the west by the London and South Western Railway (the surviving main line) and to the north by the Alton, Alresford and Winchester Railway, part of which survives to the east as the Watercress Line.

Costain built the A34 bypass from 1968.

== Conservation ==
Worthys Conservation Volunteers is the local group of practical conservationists working on the third Sunday of each month to care for the wildlife and natural environment in and around the village and The Worthys.

== Representation ==
Cllr Jackie Porter, Cllr Malcolm Prince and Cllr Jane Rutter (all Liberal Democrats) represent The Worthys ward on Winchester City Council.
