= Canongate Myth Series =

Novellas from the Scottish publisher featuring modern retellings of ancient legends

The Canongate Myth Series is a series of novellas published by the independent Scottish publisher Canongate Books, in which ancient myths from various cultures are reimagined and rewritten. The project was conceived in 1999 by Jamie Byng, owner of Canongate, and the first three titles in the series were published on 21 October 2005. Though the initial novellas received mixed-to-positive reviews, the project was heralded by many in the press as "bold" and "ambitious", with the tabloid Metro calling it "one of the most ambitious acts of mass storytelling in recent years".

The series is intended to have an international focus, with contributing authors that have included Russian writer Victor Pelevin and Israeli author David Grossman. Also, the first title in the series, Karen Armstrong's A Short History of Myth, was published the same day in 33 countries and 28 languages, in what The Washington Post called "the biggest simultaneous publication ever". As of 2008, nine books have been published in the series, with Byng hoping to eventually publish 100.

Three titles were published in the United Kingdom on 1 November 2007: Binu and the Great Wall by Su Tong, Girl Meets Boy by Ali Smith, and Where Three Roads Meet by Salley Vickers. Installments in the series are also forthcoming from the authors A. S. Byatt, Chinua Achebe and Natsuo Kirino.

Michel Faber's contribution, The Fire Gospel, was published in 2008. 2009 saw the publication of Baba Yaga Laid an Egg by Dubravka Ugrešić and The Hurricane Party by Klas Östergren.

Orphans of Eldorado by Milton Hatoum and The Good Man Jesus and the Scoundrel Christ by Philip Pullman were published in 2010.

== List of titles ==
| Title | Author | Mythological characters | Publication date |
|---|---|---|---|
| A Short History of Myth | Karen Armstrong | | (Serbia) (United Kingdom) (United States) 21 October 2005 (Brazil) 19 October 2005 |
| The Penelopiad | Margaret Atwood | Penelope, Odysseus | (Serbia) (United Kingdom) (United States) 21 October 2005 (Brazil) 19 October 2005 |
| Weight | Jeanette Winterson | Atlas, Heracles | (Serbia) (United Kingdom) (United States) 21 October 2005 |
| The Helmet of Horror | Victor Pelevin (trans. Andrew Bromfield) | Theseus, the Minotaur | (Russia) 2005 (United Kingdom) (United States) 2 March 2006 (Serbia) October 2006 (Brazil) 30 November 2006 |
| Lion's Honey | David Grossman (trans. Stuart Schoffman) | Samson | (Israel) 2005 (United States) 23 March 2006 (United Kingdom) 1 June 2006 (Serbia) October 2006 (Brazil) 4 December 2006 |
| Dream Angus | Alexander McCall Smith | Aengus | (United States) 12 September 2006 (United Kingdom) 5 October 2006 (Serbia) October 2006 |
| Anna In w grobowcach świata (Anna In in the Tombs of the World) | Olga Tokarczuk (not translated to English) | Inanna | (Poland) 2006 |
| Girl Meets Boy | Ali Smith | Iphis | (United Kingdom) 1 November 2007 (United States) 21 December 2007 (Brazil) 26 September 2008 |
| Binu and the Great Wall | Su Tong (trans. Howard Goldblatt) | Meng Jiang Nü | (China) 2006 (Serbia) October 2006 (United Kingdom) 1 November 2007 (United States) 18 February 2008 |
| Where Three Roads Meet | Salley Vickers | Oedipus, Tiresias | (United Kingdom) 1 November 2007 (United States) 10 August 2008 |
| Baba Yaga Laid an Egg | Dubravka Ugrešić | Baba Yaga | (Serbia) April 2008 (United Kingdom) May 2009 |
| The Fire Gospel | Michel Faber | Prometheus | (United Kingdom) November 2008 |
| The Goddess Chronicle | Natsuo Kirino (trans. Rebecca Copeland) | Izanagi, Izanami | (United Kingdom) 3 March 2013 |
| Orphans of Eldorado | Milton Hatoum | Mythology of Amazonia | (Brazil) January 2008 (Serbia) 2 July 2009 |
| The Hurricane Party | Klas Östergren | Norse mythology | (Sweden) August 2007; 2009 |
| The Good Man Jesus and the Scoundrel Christ | Philip Pullman | Christian mythology | April 2010 (Brazil) 28 October 2010 |
| Ragnarok: The End of the Gods | A. S. Byatt | Ragnarok | (United Kingdom) September 2011 |
| The Song of King Gesar | Alai (trans. Howard Goldblatt) (trans. Sylvia Li-chun Lin) | Epic of King Gesar | (United Kingdom) November 2013 |
