= Jamie Byng =

British publisher (born 1969)

James Byng
- Born: James Edmund Byng; 27 June 1969 (age 57)
- Education: Winchester College; University of Edinburgh
- Occupation: Publisher
- Employer: Canongate Books
- Spouses: Whitney McVeigh (divorced) Elizabeth Sheinkman (m. 2005; div. 2016) Silvia Gimenez Varela (m. 2021)
- Children: 5
- Relatives: Thomas Byng, 8th Earl of Strafford (father); Georgia Byng (sister); Sir Christopher Bland (stepfather); Archie Bland (half-brother)

James Edmund Byng (born 27 June 1969) is a British publisher. He works for the independent publishing firm Canongate Books, where he is the CEO and publisher.

== Early life ==
Byng grew up in the village of Abbots Worthy in Hampshire, England. The second son of the 8th Earl of Strafford and his first wife Jennifer May, he is a brother of the author Lady Georgia Byng, and through his stepfather, Sir Christopher Bland (the former chairman of the BBC, British Telecom and Royal Shakespeare Company), he is the half-brother of Archie Bland, print journalist and former deputy editor of The Independent.

== Education and family ==
Byng was educated at Winchester College, an independent boarding-school for boys in the cathedral city of Winchester in Hampshire, Southern England, followed by the University of Edinburgh. While attending the university, he ran a funk, reggae, and rare groove night club named "Chocolate City" (after the Parliament classic) at The Venue with his first wife, Whitney McVeigh, with whom he has two children – a daughter Marley and son Leo. Whitney McVeigh is the daughter of a socialite mother and her father is an American banker. Byng and McVeigh separated in 2001, and in 2005 Byng married literary agent Elizabeth Sheinkman, with whom he has two children, Ivy and Nathaniel. Byng separated from Sheinkman in 2016 and married Silvia Gimenez Varela in 2021 and they have one child.

== Publishing career ==
After graduating, he convinced Scottish publisher Stephanie Wolfe Murray to give him a job at Canongate, then a respected but still somewhat marginalised Scottish company founded in 1973, which he joined as an intern. When Canongate was on the verge of bankruptcy in 1994, Byng, then in his mid-20s, instigated a buyout, aided by his business partner Hugh Andrew, his stepfather (former BBC chairman Sir Christopher Bland) and then father-in-law (co-chairman of the multinational investment bank Salomon Smith Barney). His first move in overhauling the company's image was to establish the ultra-hip Payback and Rebel Inc imprints, dedicated to championing cult authors. The Pocket Canons (1998) published in partnership with Matthew Darby was Byng's first runaway success: selected books from the Bible individually packaged with new introductions by the Dalai Lama among others. In the wake of the two-million selling, Booker-winning Life of Pi (2001), Canongate won Publisher of the Year at the British Book Awards in 2003, reportedly posting pre-tax profits of more than £1 million for that year.

Byng is the initiator and chair of World Book Night, an event in which on 5 March 2011 (following World Book Day on 3 March) one million books – 40,000 copies of each of 25 carefully selected titles – were given away to members of the public in the UK and Ireland. It entailed 20,000 "givers" each distributing 48 copies of their chosen title to whomever they chose.
