= Raffey Cassidy =

English actress (born 2001)

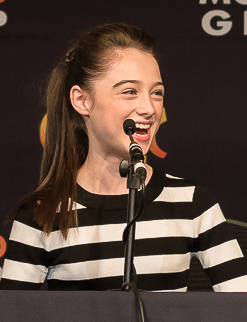
- Cassidy in 2015
- Born: Raffey Camomile Cassidy; 12 November 2001 (age 25); Worsley, Salford, England
- Occupation: Actress
- Years active: 2009–present
- Relatives: Grace Cassidy (sister)

Raffey Camomile Cassidy (born 12 November 2001) is an English actress. She first appeared as a child actress in the television movie Spanish Flu: The Forgotten Fallen (2009), adding her first brief film role in Dark Shadows (2012), her first main cast television role in 32 Brinkburn Street (2011), and main cast film role in Tomorrowland (2015). She followed this with a dual role in director Brady Corbet's Vox Lux (2018) and her first top billing in The Other Lamb (2019). She had another dual role in the 2024 drama film The Brutalist, also directed by Corbet.

== Early life ==
Raffey Camomile Cassidy was born on 12 November 2001 in Salford, England. Her father teaches acting, and she grew up in a family where her siblings were also involved in the entertainment business. Cassidy took acting classes at David Johnson Drama in Manchester. Her first part came unexpectedly as she was accompanying her older brother, Finney Cassidy on an audition for a role on a BBC drama. The casting crew needed a girl and, according to Cassidy, she "just happened to be there”.

== Career ==
Cassidy's credits in 2012 include brief film roles in Tim Burton's Dark Shadows, as well as Snow White and the Huntsman, portraying the young version of Kristen Stewart's Snow White. In 2015, Cassidy completed production as the title character of Molly in Amber Entertainment's Molly Moon and the Incredible Book of Hypnotism, and starred as the Audio-Animatronic Athena in Disney's Tomorrowland, as an assistant to Hugh Laurie's character. On television, she co-starred in Mr. Selfridge, alongside Jeremy Piven.

In 2013, Cassidy was named to Screen International magazine's Stars of Tomorrow. At that time, she was the youngest actor ever to be featured on the annual list.

== Filmography ==
Key
†	Denotes films that have not yet been released

=== Film ===
Year	Title	Role	Notes
2012	Dark Shadows	Young Angélique Bouchard	
2012	Snow White and the Huntsman	Young Snow White	
2013	The Beast	Mia	Short film
2015	Molly Moon and the Incredible Book of Hypnotism	Molly Moon	
2015	Tomorrowland	Athena	
2015	Rust	Georgie	Short film
2016	Miranda's Letter	Miranda	Short film
2016	Allied	Anna Vatan	
2017	The Killing of a Sacred Deer	Kimberly "Kim" Murphy	
2018	Vox Lux	Young Celeste / Albertine	
2019	The Other Lamb	Selah	
2020	Nightwalk	Girl	Short film
2022	White Noise	Denise Gladney	
2023	Kensuke's Kingdom	Becky (voice)	
2024	The Brutalist	Zsófia / Zsófia's daughter	
TBA	The Silence of Mercy †	Arild	Post-production
TBA	Black Palace †	—N/a	Post-production

=== Television ===
Year	Title	Role	Notes
2009	Spanish Flu: The Forgotten Fallen	Ellen	TV movie
2011	32 Brinkburn Street	Nora	Main cast
2012	Stepping Up	Freya	Episode: "The Cloudwatch Club"
2013	Mr Selfridge	Beatrice Selfridge	Recurring role (series 1)
2024	Secret Level	Felicity Karo	Episode: "The Outer Worlds: The Company We Keep" (voice and motion capture role)
