= Stephanie Wolfe Murray =

British publisher and charity worker (1941–2017)

Stephanie Vivian Wolfe Murray (née Todd; 27 April 1941 – 24 June 2017) was a British publisher and charity worker, who was co-founder of the Scottish publisher Canongate Books in 1973 and ran the company until it was bought out in 1993.

== Early life and education ==
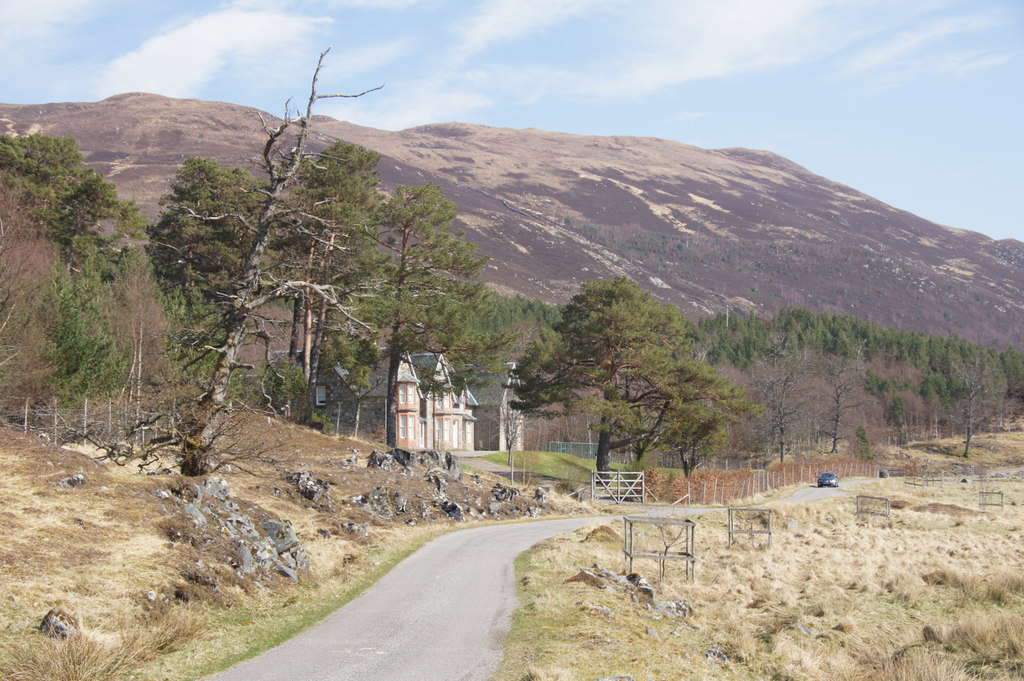
Braulen Lodge, Glen Strathfarrar

Stephanie Vivian Todd was born on 27 April 1941 in Blandford Camp, Dorset, England. Her father, Hadden Royden Todd (1910–1944), was an officer in the Royal Artillery who was killed during the Battle of Normandy. Her mother, Louisa May "Wendy" Todd (née Robins; 1914–1991), "came from a wealthy family linked to the Bibby Line shipping company". Her mother remarried after the war, first briefly to a New Zealander, and then to Henry George Villiers Greer, a Northern Irishman who had been a prisoner of war in Burma. She grew up in Shropshire and was educated at Overstone School, an all-girls independent boarding school in Northampton.

She left school at 16 and began to travel through Europe. She spent time in Paris, France, where she learned French, and then in Florence, Italy, where she studied and worked at the Hotel Savoy.

She returned to England, became a débutante and was featured on the cover of Queen magazine. Among her suitors was Anthony Armstrong Jones, later husband of Princess Margaret, but she fell in love with Angus Malcolm Wolfe Murray (born 1937), a journalist at The Yorkshire Post. Rather than be allowed to marry the "penniless journalist", her mother sent her to New York. However, upon Stephanie's return, she still wished to marry Wolfe Murray and was only allowed to do so when he made it known that he had titled relatives: his maternal grandfather was Patrick Boyle, 8th Earl of Glasgow. They married on 11 November 1961 at the Church of St Michael & Our Lady, Wragby. The couple lived at Braulen Lodge in Strathfarrar, Scotland, and soon had four sons.

== Career ==
In 1973, Wolfe Murray co-founded the publishing company Canongate Books and her husband, and after he left the following year she ran it almost alone.
