= Canongate Books =

Scottish independent publishing firm

Canongate Books Ltd.
- Founded: 1973; 53 years ago
- Country of origin: United Kingdom
- Headquarters location: Edinburgh, Scotland
- Distribution: The Book Service (UK); Grove Atlantic (US)
- Key people: Jamie Byng, Publisher and Managing Director
- Publication types: Books
- Imprints: Severn House Publishers
- Official website: canongate.co.uk

Canongate Books (trading as Canongate) is an independent publishing firm based in Edinburgh, Scotland.

It is named after the Canongate area of the city. It is most recognised for publishing the Booker Prize winning novel Life of Pi (2001). Canongate was named the British Book Awards Publisher of the Year in 2003 and 2009.

== Origins ==
Canongate was founded in 1973 by Stephanie Wolfe Murray and her husband Angus Wolfe Murray. Originally a speciality press focusing on Scottish-interest books, generally with small print runs, its most major author was Alasdair Gray. In 1994, it was purchased from the receiver in a management buyout led by Jamie Byng, using funds provided by his stepfather Christopher Bland and his father-in-law Charlie McVeigh, and began to publish more general works, including the Pocket Canons editions of books of the Bible, as well as the Payback Press and Rebel Inc. imprints. Byng is CEO of the company.

In June 2010 it was announced that a "living archive" of Canongate Books was to be established at the University of Dundee in collaboration with the University's Archive Services, which will be used for teaching and research.

== Partners and joint ventures ==
Canongate once had a sister company in Australia, Text Publishing; Canongate's majority interest was sold in 2011. It also has joint venture operations with the children's publisher Walker who will publish selected titles for their young adult fiction list. Grove/Atlantic, Inc. publishes under the Canongate U.S. imprint, also under a joint venture arrangement. In March 2010, Canongate and Dirtee Stank announced a joint venture agreement to publish Dizzee Rascal's memoir, although this agreement later fell through.

Canongate is part of the Independent Alliance, a global alliance of 10 UK publishers and their international publishing partners. In 2009, the Alliance was the UK's fifth-largest publisher.

Enhanced Editions and Canongate also work in partnership in the production of selected books enhanced for the iPhone and iPod Touch. The titles that have been released are: Dreams From My Father, The Audacity of Hope, The Death of Bunny Munro and The Good Man Jesus and the Scoundrel Christ.

== Notable authors and works ==
=== Before 1994 ===
Alasdair Gray

- Lanark: A Life in Four Books (1981)
- A Life in Pictures (2010)

Charles Palliser

- The Quincunx (1989)

=== Later ===
Julian Assange

- Julian Assange – the Unauthorised Autobiography (2011). Assange's autobiography was published without his consent, and Canongate and Assange gave differing accounts of the events surrounding publication.

The Mighty Boosh

- The Mighty Book of Boosh (2008) and The Pocket Book of Boosh (2009), a coffee-table style hardback and "pocket" edition of a tie-in to the TV series.

Noel Fielding (with Mighty Boosh member Dave Brown)

- The Scribblings of a Madcap Shambleton (2011).

Nick Cave

- The Death of Bunny Munro (2009), the second novel by musician Nick Cave, was announced in 2008. It was published in hardback, audiobook, ebook and iPhone application formats in September 2009.

David Eagleman

- Sum: Forty Tales from the Afterlives (2009), made famous by a Tweet from Stephen Fry and the subject of a live show by Brian Eno.

Michel Faber

- The Crimson Petal and the White (2002), a historical novel set in Victorian England. Faber followed this with a collection of stories, The Apple (2006).

Matt Haig

- The Radleys (2010)

Steven Hall

- The Raw Shark Texts (2007)

Miranda July

- No One Belongs Here More Than You (2007)

Ismail Kadare

- The Ghost Rider
- The Siege (2008)

Yann Martel

- Life of Pi (2001, Canongate edition 2002), the first Scottish-published book to win the Booker Prize or to sell a million copies in its first year. An illustrated hardback edition was published in 2007.
- Beatrice and Virgil (2010), an allegory of the Holocaust using a donkey named Beatrice and a howler monkey named Virgil.

James Meek

- The People's Act of Love (2005), winner of the Scottish Arts Council Book of the Year and the Ondaatje Prize.

Barack Obama

- Dreams from My Father (1995, Canongate edition 2007)
- The Audacity of Hope (2006, Canongate edition 2007) was acquired after a series of emails between Byng and then-Senator Obama and his team.
- Change We Can Believe In (2008, Canongate edition 2009)

Dizzee Rascal

- The Dizzee Rascal Story (2010)

David Shrigley

- What The Hell Are You Doing? (2010)

David Simon

- Homicide: A Year on the Killing Streets (1991, Canongate edition 2008)
- The Corner: A Year in the Life of an Inner-City Neighborhood (1997, Canongate edition 2009)

Martin C. Strong

- The Great Rock Discography, 1st ed. (1994)
- The Great Rock Discography, 2nd ed. (1995)
- The Great Rock Discography, 3rd ed. (1996)
- The Great Rock Discography, 4th ed. (1998)
- The Great Rock Discography, 5th ed. (2000)
- The Great Rock Discography, 6th ed. (2002)
- The Great Rock Discography, 7th ed. (2004)
- The Great Metal Discography, 1st ed. (1998)
- The Great Metal Discography, 2nd ed. (2002)
- The Wee Rock Discography (1996)
- The Great Alternative & Indie Discography (1999)
- The Great Indie Discography, 2nd ed. (2003)
- The Essential Rock Discography (2006)
- Lights, Camera, Soundtracks (2008)

Scarlett Thomas

- The End of Mr. Y (2007)
- PopCo (2004, Canongate edition 2009)
- Our Tragic Universe (2010)

Simon Tofield

- Simon's Cat (2009), the award-winning animation was published in book format in October 2009.

=== Canongate Myth Series ===
In which contemporary authors re-imagine ancient myths from a variety of cultures

- Karen Armstrong, A Short History of Myth (2005)
- Margaret Atwood, The Penelopiad (2005)
- Jeanette Winterson, Weight (2005)
- Michel Faber, The Fire Gospel (2008)
- David Grossman, Lion's Honey (2006)
- Alexander McCall Smith, Dream Angus (2006)
- Victor Pelevin, The Helmet of Horror (2006)
- Ali Smith, Girl Meets Boy (2007)
- Su Tong, Binu and the Great Wall (2007)
- Salley Vickers, Where Three Roads Meet (2007)
- Dubravka Ugrešić, Baba Yaga Laid an Egg (2009)
- Klas Östergren, The Hurricane Party (2009)
- Milton Hatoum, The Orphans of Eldorado (2010)
- Philip Pullman, The Good Man Jesus and the Scoundrel Christ (2010)

== Prizes ==
- 2007: No One Belongs Here More Than You by Miranda July won the Frank O'Connor International Short Story Award.
- 2008: The Boat by Nam Le won the Dylan Thomas Prize.
- 2009: Jeff in Venice, Death in Varanasi by Geoff Dyer won the Bollinger Everyman Wodehouse Prize.
- 2009: The Boat by Nam Le won the Australian Prime Minister's Literary Awards.
- 2015: Beatlebone by Kevin Barry won the Goldsmiths Prize.
- 2016: Solar Bones by Mike McCormack won the Goldsmiths Prize.
- 2016: The Outrun by Amy Liptrot won the Wainwright Prize.

== See also ==
- Canongate Myth Series
- List of largest book publishers of the United Kingdom
- Publishing Scotland
- Ian Burgham
