= Anya Taylor-Joy =

Actress (born 1996)

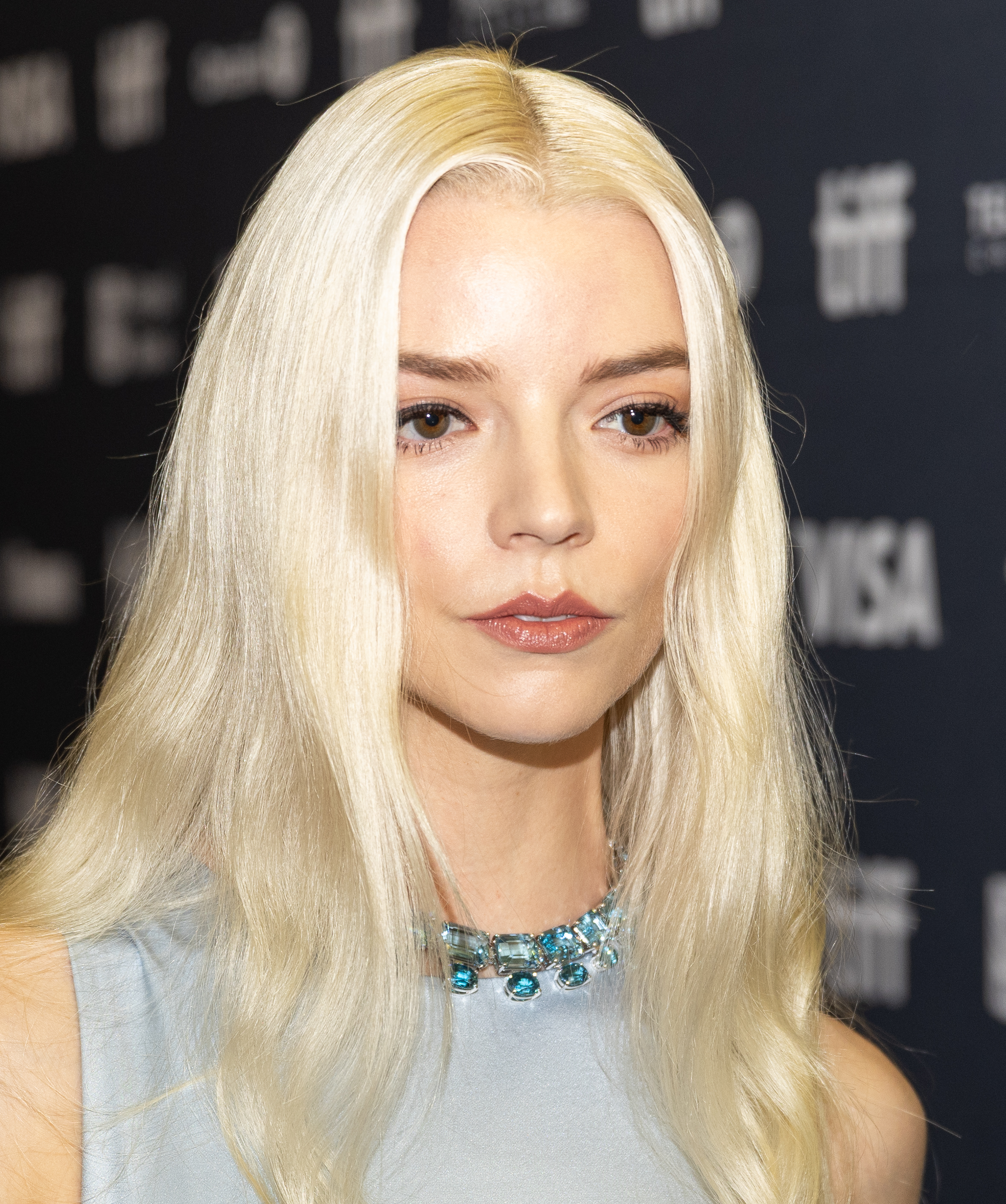
- Taylor-Joy in 2025
- Born: Anya-Josephine Marie Taylor-Joy; 16 April 1996 (age 30); Miami, Florida, U.S.
- Citizenship: United Kingdom; United States (Note: Taylor-Joy is a dual national of the United Kingdom and United States, born in Miami to an Argentine-British father and British-Spanish mother, and raised in Argentina and the United Kingdom. Sources conflict over her citizenship status in Argentina, with some claiming she is an Argentine national and others that she is merely a legal permanent resident without citizenship.)
- Occupation: Actress
- Years active: 2013–present
- Spouse: Malcolm McRae (m. 2022)
- Awards: Full list

Anya-Josephine Marie Taylor-Joy (/ˈænjə/; born 16 April 1996) is an actress. Born in Miami, she grew up in Buenos Aires and London. She began pursuing an acting career at the age of 16. After a series of small television roles, her breakthrough came with a leading role in the horror film The Witch (2015). She had roles in the horror film Split (2016) and its sequel Glass (2019), the black comedy film Thoroughbreds (2017), and the television crime drama series Peaky Blinders (2019–2022). Taylor-Joy also played Emma Woodhouse in the period drama Emma (2020).

She gained wide recognition for playing Beth Harmon in the period drama miniseries The Queen's Gambit (2020), receiving the Golden Globe and SAG Award for Best Actress, and a nomination for the Primetime Emmy for Outstanding Lead Actress. Then she starred in the horror film Last Night in Soho (2021), the action films The Northman (2022) and The Gorge (2025), the black comedy The Menu (2022); and the apocalyptic film Furiosa: A Mad Max Saga (2024) as Imperator Furiosa. She voiced Princess Peach in the animated films The Super Mario Bros. Movie (2023) and The Super Mario Galaxy Movie (2026).

== Early life ==
I didn't really feel like I fit in anywhere. I was too English to be Argentine, too Argentine to be English, too American to be anything... The kids just didn't understand me in any shape or form... I used to get locked in lockers.

— Taylor-Joy on her multicultural heritage

Anya-Josephine Marie Taylor-Joy was born 16 April 1996 in Miami, Florida, to Dennis Alan Taylor, a former banker and offshore powerboat racer who won two Union Internationale Motonautique (UIM) world offshore championships in the 1980s, and Jennifer Marina Joy, a psychologist. Her father is an Argentine of English and Scottish descent, the son of a British father and an Anglo-Argentine mother. Her mother was born in Zambia to an English diplomat father, David Joy, and a Spanish mother from Barcelona, Montserrat Morancho. Taylor-Joy says that her birth in Miami was a "fluke", since her parents had been vacationing in the city at the time. Because of her birthplace, she holds American citizenship due to U.S. jus soli nationality law. She is the youngest of six siblings, four of whom are from her father's previous marriage.

Taylor-Joy lived with her family in Buenos Aires, Argentina and attended Northlands School. When she was six, the family moved to the Victoria area of London. She is fluent in Spanish and English. She experienced the move as "traumatic" and initially refused to learn English in the hope of moving back to Argentina. She was a student at Hill House International Junior School in Knightsbridge, London and Queen's Gate School in South Kensington, London, acting in school productions. She struggled socially at school where she was bullied and ostracized.

Taylor-Joy initially trained in dance, studying ballet until the age of 15. At age 17, she was scouted as a model by Storm Management founder Sarah Doukas, while walking her dog outside Harrods department store in Knightsbridge. She signed with the agency on the condition that acting remain her first passion and pursuit. During a modelling shoot promoting the television series Downton Abbey, which she had almost rejected because she was studying for her GCSE examinations, Taylor-Joy was noticed by Allen Leech, an actor on Downton Abbey while running errands for the crew and while reciting the Seamus Heaney poem "Digging" for a forthcoming screentest. He later introduced her to his agent, with whom she signed as an actress.

== Career ==
=== 2013–2019: Early work and recognition ===
Taylor-Joy made her acting debut in the 2014 fantasy comedy-horror Vampire Academy, but her scenes as a background "Feeder Girl" were dropped from the final cut. Her television debut was portraying Philippa Collins-Davidson in an episode of the detective drama series Endeavour. That was followed by a multi-episode arc in Atlantis, a 2015 fantasty-adventure drama series. Also in 2015, she starred in The Witch, a period horror film directed by Robert Eggers, about a Puritan family which encounters forces of evil in the woods near their New England farm. It premiered at the 2015 Sundance Film Festival to critical acclaim. The role was her breakthrough. Anthony Lane of The New Yorker called Taylor-Joy "remarkable in the role, her wide-eyed innocence entwined with a thread of cunning—proof either of her quick wits, scarcely unusual in a clever and curious girl, or of some fell purpose." She won the Gotham Independent Film Award for Breakthrough Actor and the Empire Award for Best Female Newcomer.

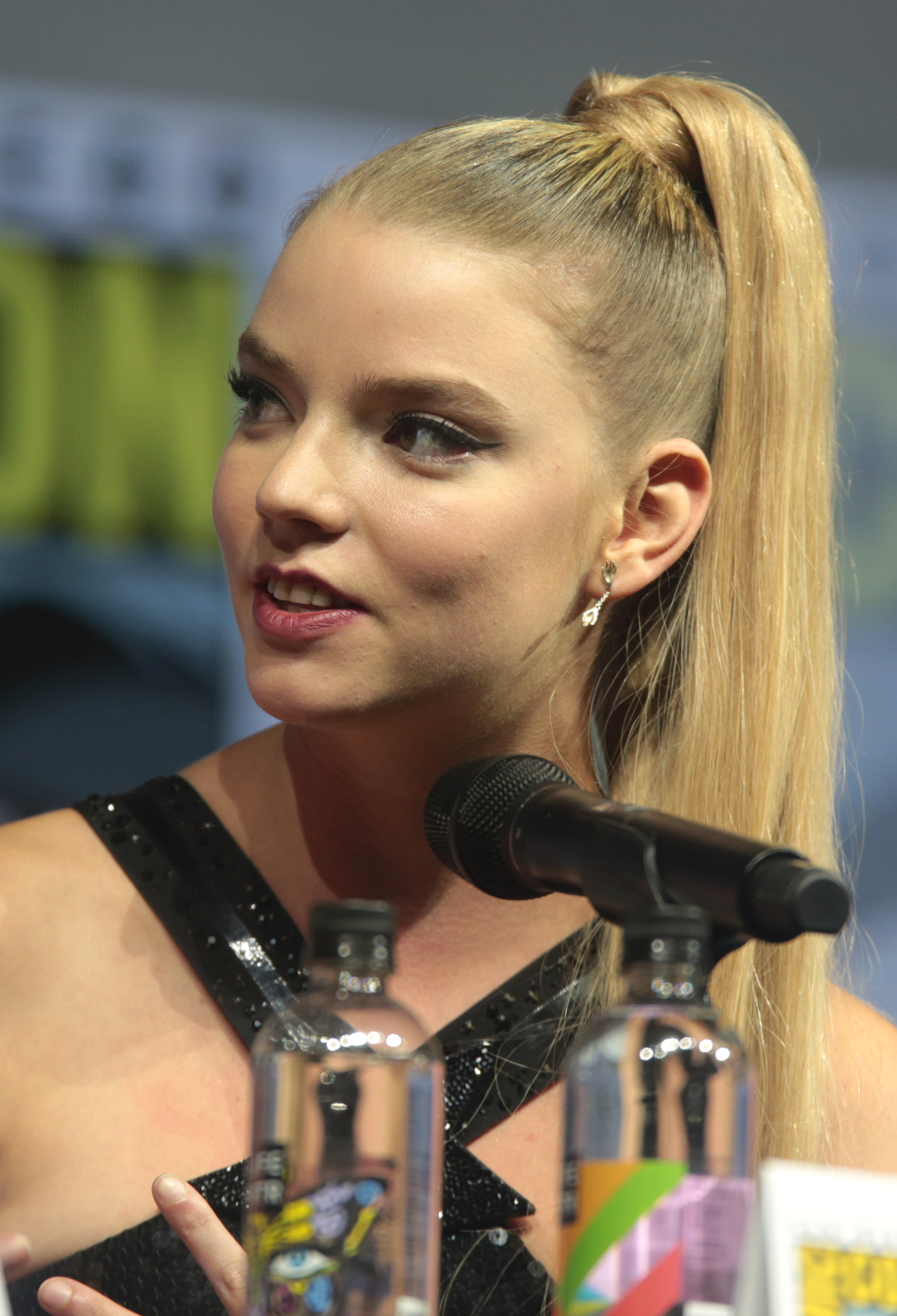
Taylor-Joy at the 2018 San Diego Comic-Con

In 2016, Taylor-Joy starred in Luke Scott's science fiction horror film Morgan, playing the title character. It received negative reviews and was a commercial failure, but Booth Michigan's John Serba wrote that "Taylor-Joy disarms us with a performance that keenly teeter-totters between little-girl innocent and dead-eyed viciousness." She next starred in the drama film Barry, which focused on a young Barack Obama during his first year at Columbia University in 1981; it premiered at the 2016 Toronto International Film Festival.

In 2016, Taylor-Joy's likeness was licensed from Storm Management to represent the character of Valkyrie Cain on the tenth anniversary book cover of Skulduggery Pleasant, and subsequently the covers of the seventh, eighth, ninth, and fourteenth books in the series, before appearing in the music video for Skrillex's remix of GTA's song "Red Lips".

In 2016, she was cast opposite James McAvoy in M. Night Shyamalan's Split, where she played Casey Cooke, a teenage girl abducted by a man with multiple personalities (McAvoy). It was a commercial success, grossing $278.5 million on a budget of $9 million. Her next film that year was Cory Finley's directorial debut Thoroughbreds. It co-starred Olivia Cooke and Anton Yelchin in his final film role. Taylor-Joy played Lily, a high-school student who schemes to kill her stepfather via a contract with a drug dealer. It premiered at the 2017 Sundance Film Festival; David Ehrlich of IndieWire called her performance "captivating".

Her third release in 2017 was Sergio G. Sánchez's horror mystery Marrowbone; Tasha Robinson of The Verge wrote that Taylor-Joy brought "a shy, appealing warmth" to an inconsistent character. Taylor-Joy was nominated for the BAFTA Rising Star Award, and was awarded the Trophée Chopard at the Cannes Film Festival that year. In December 2017, she portrayed Petronella Oortman in the BBC One period drama miniseries The Miniaturist, based on Jessie Burton's novel of the same name. Taylor-Joy reprised her role as Casey Cooke in the 2019 psychological superhero film Glass, the final film in the Unbreakable film trilogy, appearing with McAvoy, Samuel L. Jackson and Sarah Paulson. It was a commercial success, grossing $247 million worldwide, Later that year, she appeared in the documentary film Love, Antosha, on the life and career of her late co-star Anton Yelchin; and in Hozier's music video for his song "Dinner & Diatribes".

Her next two 2019 films, the animated musical adventure film Playmobil: The Movie and biographical drama film Radioactive, were commercial failures. She also voiced the character of Brea in the fantasy series The Dark Crystal: Age of Resistance. In her final role of 2019, she played the starring role of Gina Gray in the BBC One period crime drama series Peaky Blinders.

=== 2020–present: mainstream breakthrough ===
In 2020, Taylor-Joy starred as Emma Woodhouse in Autumn de Wilde's directorial debut Emma, an adaptation of Jane Austen's 1815 novel of the same name. Reviewing the film, Peter Travers of Rolling Stone deemed Taylor-Joy "incandescent". The Guardian critic Mark Kermode described Taylor-Joy as having created an "admirably spiky character who is less likable than some of her screen predecessors, and all the better for it". She received a Golden Globe Award nomination for her performance. Taylor-Joy also portrayed Illyana Rasputin/Magik, a Russian mutant and sorceress, in the superhero horror film The New Mutants. It was originally intended for release in April 2018 but experienced several delays; it was released in 2020.

Taylor-Joy starred in the Netflix miniseries The Queen's Gambit as Beth Harmon, an orphaned chess prodigy on her rise to the top of the chess world while struggling with drug and alcohol dependency. The series and her performance received widespread critical acclaim. Netflix announced that it had been seen by 62 million households in its first 28 days of release, becoming its "biggest scripted limited series to date." Darren Franich of Entertainment Weekly called Taylor-Joy's performance "darkly fascinating" and noted how she "excels in the quiet moments, [with] her eyelids narrowing as she decimates an opponent, [and] her whole body physicalizing angry desperation when the game turns against her." Similarly, Caroline Framke of Variety found her "so magnetic that when she stares down the camera lens, her flinty glare threatens to cut right through it." Taylor-Joy's portrayal won her the Golden Globe Award for Best Actress – Miniseries or Television Film and the Screen Actors Guild Award for Outstanding Performance by a Female Actor in a Miniseries or Television Movie and garnered her a nomination for the Primetime Emmy Award for Outstanding Lead Actress in a Limited or Anthology Series or Movie.

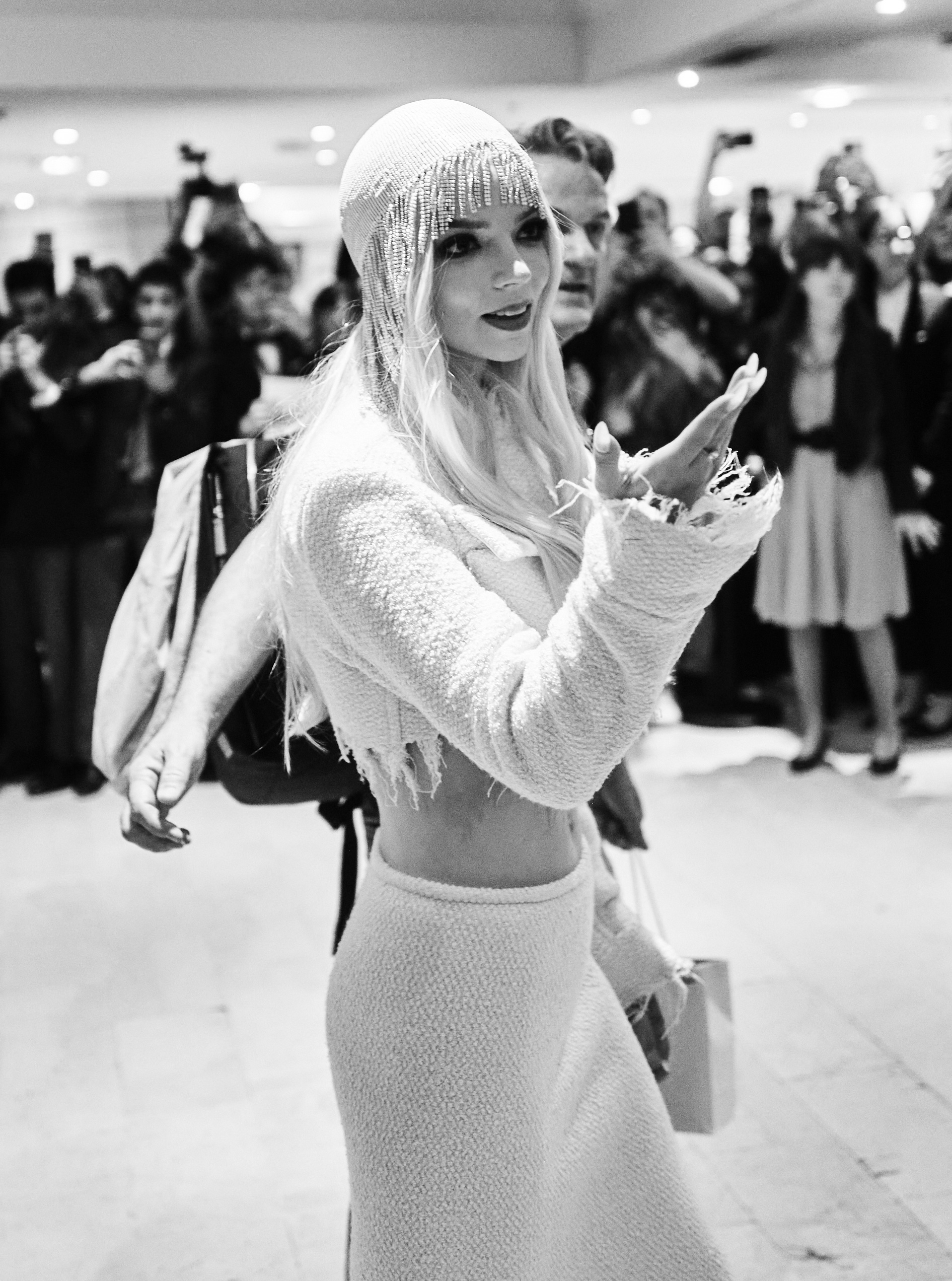
Taylor-Joy at the 2024 Cannes Film Festival in Cannes, France

Then she appeared in the drama film Here Are the Young Men (2020) directed by Eoin Macken and based on the novel of the same name by Rob Doyle. In 2021, she starred in Edgar Wright's psychological horror film Last Night in Soho. In the film, she performs the song "Downtown" by Petula Clark; a music video of Taylor-Joy's rendition was also released. Joe Morgenstern of The Wall Street Journal highlighted the "dazzling sense of purpose" in her portrayal. She was included in Time's 100 Next in 2021.

In 2022, Taylor-Joy reunited with The Witch director Robert Eggers for a starring role opposite Alexander Skarsgård in the historical epic The Northman. Based on the old Scandinavian legend of Amleth, the film was called "a Viking revenge saga set in Iceland at the turn of century". It received a positive critical reception. Taylor-Joy then appeared in David O. Russell's period comedy Amsterdam, which received mixed reviews and failed commercially.

Mark Mylod's black comedy thriller The Menu was released in November 2022. Taylor-Joy starred opposite Nicholas Hoult and Ralph Fiennes in it. The film received largely positive reviews and her performance garnered her a Golden Globe Award nomination. In 2023, she had a voice role as Princess Peach in the animated film The Super Mario Bros. Movie.

In 2024 she acted in a cameo role as Alia Atreides in Denis Villeneuve's Dune: Part Two, a casting that was initially kept secret and was not publicly announced until she walked the red carpet at the film's London premiere. Then she starred as the titular character in George Miller's action film Furiosa: A Mad Max Saga, which served as a prequel to the 2015 film Mad Max: Fury Road. Taylor-Joy declared the film to have been an unpleasant working endeavor: "I've never been more alone than making that movie... I don't want to go too deep into it, but everything that I thought was going to be easy was hard." Nevertheless, she was praised for her performance by Peter Bradshaw in The Guardian; he said she is "an overwhelmingly convincing action heroine"

In 2025, she starred opposite Miles Teller in Scott Derrickson's romantic action film The Gorge, which was released on Apple TV+. She starred alongside Chris Evans in the action comedy film Sacrifice. On 18 August 2025, it was reported that Taylor-Joy will portray a young Joni Mitchell in a Cameron Crowe-directed biopic; Meryl Streep is to play an older Mitchell.

In 2026, she reprised her role as Princess Peach in The Super Mario Galaxy Movie and starred as the title character in the Apple TV miniseries Lucky.

== Personal life and public image ==
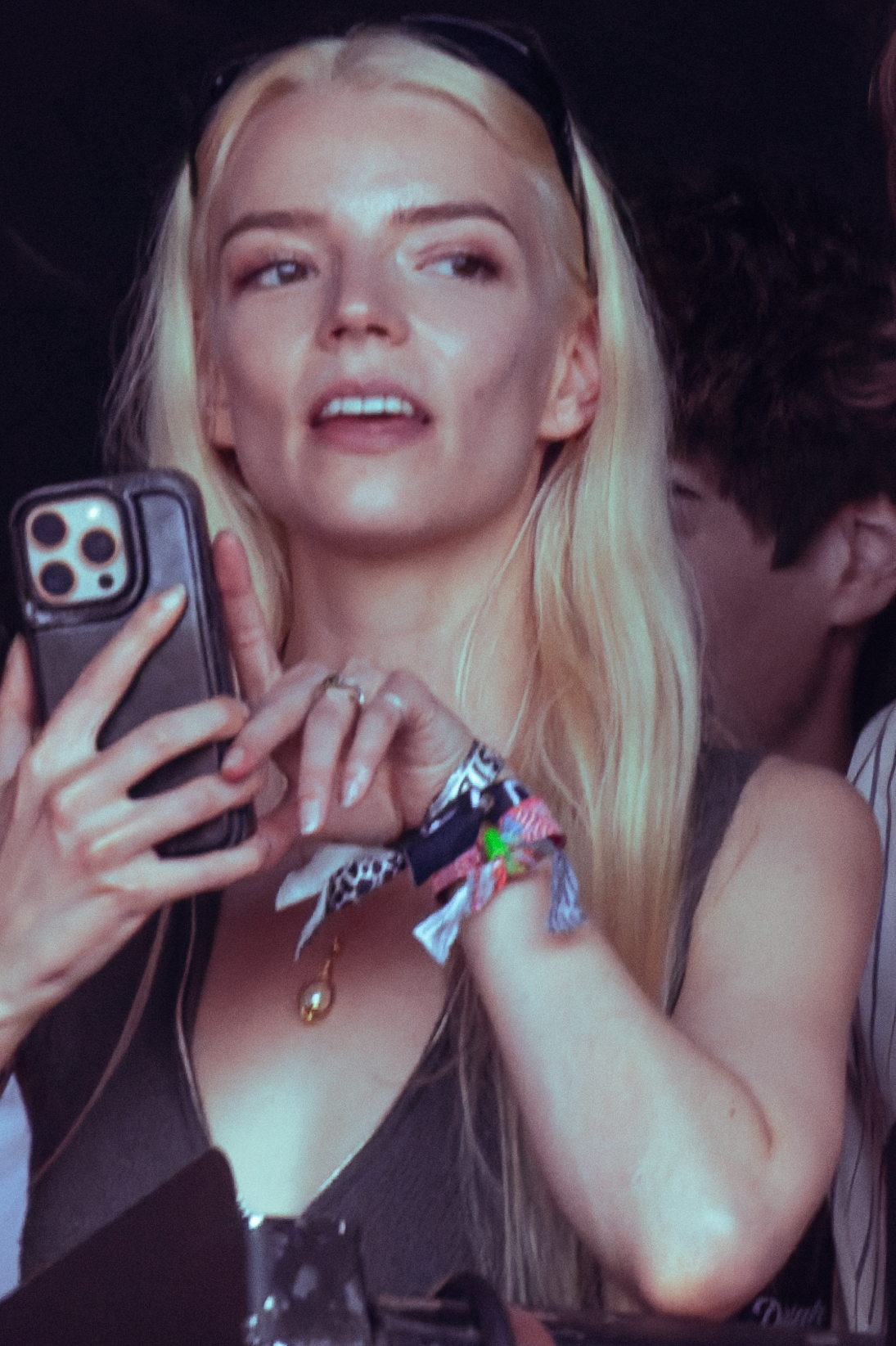
Taylor-Joy in 2025

Taylor-Joy and the musician Malcolm McRae began dating in 2021 and were married in a private ceremony on 1 April 2022 in New Orleans. They held a second ceremony in September 2023 at the Palazzo Pisani Moretta in Venice, Italy.

The Hollywood Reporter named Taylor-Joy on their list of 2016 Hollywood's Rising Stars 35 and Under, and she was included in a similar list compiled by W magazine in 2017. In 2019, she appeared on the annual Forbes 30 Under 30 list, a compilation of "the brightest young entrepreneurs, innovators and game changers in the world". In 2020, she was named "Breakthrough Entertainer" of the Year by the Associated Press. In 2021, Time included Taylor-Joy on its 100 Next list of "emerging leaders who are shaping the future", with a tribute written by former World Chess Champion Garry Kasparov. She has been an ambassador for brands including Viktor & Rolf, Tiffany & Co. Dior's fashion and makeup, and Jaeger-LeCoultre.

== Filmography ==
=== Film ===
Key
| † | Denotes projects that have not yet been released |

| Year | Title | Role | Notes | Ref. |
|---|---|---|---|---|
| 2014 | Vampire Academy | Feeder Girl | Uncredited | |
| 2015 | The Witch | Thomasin | | |
| 2016 | Morgan | Morgan | | |
| 2016 | Barry | Charlotte Baughman | | |
| 2016 | Split | Casey Cooke | | |
| 2017 | Marrowbone | Allie | | |
| 2017 | Thoroughbreds | Lily Reynolds | | |
| 2018 | Crossmaglen | Ana | Short film | |
| 2019 | Glass | Casey Cooke | | |
| 2019 | Love, Antosha | Herself | Documentary | |
| 2019 | Playmobil: The Movie | Marla Brenner | | |
| 2019 | Radioactive | Irene Curie | | |
| 2020 | Emma | Emma Woodhouse | | |
| 2020 | Here Are the Young Men | Jen | | |
| 2020 | The New Mutants | Illyana Rasputin / Magik | | |
| 2021 | Last Night in Soho | Sandie Collins | | |
| 2022 | The Northman | Olga of the Birch Forest | | |
| 2022 | The Menu | Margot Mills / Erin | | |
| 2022 | Amsterdam | Libby Voze | | |
| 2023 | The Super Mario Bros. Movie | Princess Peach (voice) | | |
| 2024 | Dune: Part Two | Alia Atreides | Uncredited cameo | |
| 2024 | Furiosa: A Mad Max Saga | Imperator Furiosa | | |
| 2025 | The Gorge | Drasa | | |
| 2025 | Sacrifice | Joan | Also executive producer | |
| 2026 | The Super Mario Galaxy Movie | Princess Peach (voice) | | |
| 2026 | Dune: Part Three † | Alia Atreides | Post-production | |
| 2027 | The Lord of the Rings: The Hunt for Gollum † | Seren | Filming | |

=== Television ===
| Year | Title | Role | Notes | Ref. |
|---|---|---|---|---|
| 2014 | Endeavour | Philippa Collins-Davidson | 1 episode | |
| 2015 | Viking Quest | Mani | Television film | |
| 2015 | Atlantis | Cassandra | Recurring role, 6 episodes | |
| 2017 | The Miniaturist | Petronella "Nella" Brandt | Miniseries, 3 episodes | |
| 2019–2022 | Peaky Blinders | Gina Gray | 11 episodes | |
| 2019 | The Dark Crystal: Age of Resistance | Brea (voice) | Main role, 10 episodes | |
| 2020 | The Queen's Gambit | Beth Harmon | Miniseries, 7 episodes | |
| 2021 | Saturday Night Live | Herself (host) | Episode: "Anya Taylor-Joy/Lil Nas X" | |
| 2026 | Lucky | Lucky Armstrong | Miniseries; also executive producer | |

=== Music videos ===
| Year | Title | Artist | Role | Ref. |
|---|---|---|---|---|
| 2015 | "Red Lips (Skrillex remix)" | GTA (featuring Sam Bruno) | Girl | |
| 2019 | "Dinner & Diatribes" | Hozier | Wife | |
| 2026 | "Jealous Lover" | The Rolling Stones | Girl | |

== Awards and nominations ==
Taylor-Joy has received several accolades. She won the Empire Award for Best Newcomer and being nominated for the Saturn Award for Best Performance by a Younger Actor in 2016. In 2017, she was a nominee for the BAFTA Rising Star Award and the recipient of the Trophée Chopard. She won the Golden Globe Award for Best Actress – Miniseries or Television Film, and the Screen Actors Guild Award for Outstanding Performance by a Female Actor in a Miniseries or Television Movie in 2021.
