= Skulduggery Pleasant: The Faceless Ones =

2009 novel by Derek Landy

The Faceless Ones
- Author: Derek Landy
- Cover artist: Tom Percival
- Language: English
- Series: Skulduggery Pleasant
- Genre: Children's novel, Fantasy novel, detective novel, comedy novel, adventure novel
- Publisher: HarperCollins
- Publication date: 6 April 2009
- Publication place: (Republic of Ireland) Ireland
- Media type: Print (hardcover)
- Pages: 395 pp (first edition, hardback)
- ISBN: 0-00-73062-37 (first edition, hardback)
- OCLC: 877986714
- Preceded by: Playing with Fire (2009)
- Followed by: Dark Days (2010)

Skulduggery Pleasant: The Faceless Ones is a young adult and fantasy novel written by Irish playwright Derek Landy, published in April 2009. It is the third of the Skulduggery Pleasant series and sequel to Skulduggery Pleasant: Playing with Fire.

The story follows the sorcerers and detectives Valkyrie Cain and Skulduggery Pleasant and numerous magic-wielding allies as they try to prevent Batu and the Diablerie from using the remains of the Grotesquery and the last teleporter to return the Faceless Ones to the world. The book would not see release in the US and Canada until 2018. HarperCollins Audio also publishes the unabridged CD sets of the books read by Rupert Degas.

== Characters ==
=== Batu ===
Batu, also known as Patrick "Paddy" Hanratty, is the mysterious force behind releasing the Faceless Ones.

=== Fletcher Renn ===
Fletcher Renn is a 17-year-old London kid and the last teleporter. He is the last of his kind and suddenly everyone is after him. He is smug, annoying, and big-headed, and if the Diablerie doesn't get to him, Valkyrie might very well strangle him anyway.

=== Kenspeckle Grouse ===
Kenspeckle Grouse, described as a cranky old man, is a doctor who fixes Skulduggery's and Valkyrie's injuries and continually lectures them both about Skulduggery's decision to train Valkyrie. Despite his disapproval, he has a soft spot for Valkyrie, strongly expressing his dislike for Skulduggery in his presence.

=== The Diablerie ===
The Diablerie was Mevolent's most ruthless group devoted to bringing the Faceless Ones back, the final active three members of which ally themselves with Batu to achieve their goal.

== Reviews ==
Skulduggery Pleasant: The Faceless Ones has opened to largely positive reviews by critics.

- Kirkus Reviews:

Earning plenty of style points for hardboiled dialogue and very scary baddies, the author gives his wonderfully tough, sassy youngster a real workout, and readers, particularly Artemis Fowl fans, will be skipping meals and sleep to get to the end.

- Sarah Webb (The Independent):

Full of brilliantly named and larger than life characters -- from Solomon Wreath to Ghastly Bespoke and Finbar Wrong -- the reader is caught up in the excitement and drama of every scene[;] Landy's dialogue crackles with authenticity and wit.

- Fergus Gunn (The Guardian):

If you enjoy battles of magic and humour popping up and making you laugh, this is just the book for you.
