= Skulduggery Pleasant: Death Bringer =

2011 novel by Derek Landy

Death Bringer
- Author: Derek Landy
- Cover artist: Tom Percival
- Language: English
- Series: Skulduggery Pleasant
- Genre: Children's novel, Fantasy novel, detective novel, comedy novel, adventure novel
- Publisher: HarperCollins
- Publication date: 1 September 2011
- Publication place: (Republic of Ireland) Ireland
- Media type: Print (hardcover)
- Pages: 603 pp (first edition, hardback)
- ISBN: 0-00-74582-07 (first edition, hardback)
- OCLC: 822992413
- Preceded by: Mortal Coil (2010)
- Followed by: Kingdom of the Wicked (2012)

Skulduggery Pleasant: Death Bringer is a young adult fantasy novel written by Irish playwright Derek Landy and published in September 2011. It is the sixth of the Skulduggery Pleasant series and sequel to Skulduggery Pleasant: Mortal Coil.

The story follows sorcerer-detectives Valkyrie Cain and Skulduggery Pleasant as they deal with emergence of the Death Bringer, Darquesse, and the return of Lord Vile.

The book was released in the US and Canada in 2018. HarperCollins Audio publishes the unabridged CD sets of the books read by Rupert Degas.

== Plot summary ==
Valkyrie attends the christening of her sister Alice. Later, during a fight while investigating a series of murders, Valkyrie momentarily becomes Darquesse, the woman foretold to destroy the world.

The necromancers discuss Valkyrie's apparent destiny of becoming their messiah, the Death Bringer. However, one necromancer has been secretly grooming disciple Melancholia St Clair to be the Death Bringer, and reveals her and her new powers.

On her way home Valkyrie sees vampire Caelan, who she's cheating on her boyfriend Fletcher with. At home, Valkyrie has conflicting feelings about her Reflection, an illusion of her that lives out her 'normal' life while Valkyrie is secretly on adventures. Later, Valkyrie is viciously attacked by Melancholia.

Skulduggery and Valkyrie discover that the necromancers plan to kill half the world's population as part of a plot to prevent both death and birth. It's also revealed that Skulduggery became the evil Lord Vile a few years after he died and was resurrected as a skeleton.

Valkyrie almost kills a man after learning that he mugged her mother. When the man is released and tracks Valkyrie to her house, he's apprehended by her Reflection, much to Valkyrie's surprise.

Valkyrie forgives Skulduggery for his past as Lord Vile, and they attend a ball at her uncle's mansion. Meanwhile, the necromancers are preparing to enact their plan to kill half the world. Skulduggery challenges Melancholia to a battle, and becomes Lord Vile. To stop him, Valkyrie persuades Melancholia to try to kill her, which awakens Darquesse. Darquesse and Lord Vile fight a long battle, and eventually revert to being Valkyrie and Skulduggery again.

Valkyrie breaks up with both Fletcher and Caelan, and ends up being forced to kill Caelan when he fights Fletcher. A reporter watches on, slowly gathering evidence of the magical world.

== Characters ==
=== Melancholia St. Clair ===
Melancholia is a necromancy disciple who seeks to embrace the mantle of Death Bringer, the necromancers' messiah.

=== Lord Vile ===
Lord Vile is a powerful necromancer and was thought to have died in a historic war. Lord Vile was also originally said to be the Death Bringer.

=== Darquesse ===
Darquesse is the True Name of Valkyrie Cain, and the foretold cause of the end of the world.

=== Caelan ===
Caelan is a vampire who has been obsessed with Valkyrie since tasting her blood in Mortal Coil.

== Reviews ==
Skulduggery Pleasant: Death Bringer opened to positive reviews by critics.

- Sarah Webb (The Independent):

Landy is being feted as the new J. K. Rowling, and for good reason. Whatever your age, read them and enjoy the ride. As Skulduggery says: “Embrace your inner lunatic. Fun times guaranteed.”

- Joseph Melda (The Book Zone):

Derek Landy has created so many great characters, but what makes them stand out so much is the banter between them, and especially between his two main protagonists. It is consistently funny, occasionally poignant, and shows the deep bond that has grown between these two over the course of their adventures together.

- Rhys Wolfgang (ThirstForFiction):

Landy bring[s] an excellent compromise between the dry humour of Skulduggery and Valkyrie and the brutal nature of the story to create an intense bathos. Plenty of scenes are deliciously violent and hard-hitting, but these are offset by some hilarious jokes. The Skulduggery Pleasant series has always been something of a black comedy, but none of the previous novels have ever truly gotten such a fantastic contrast between the funny and the deadly[...] Few authors manage to outdo themselves with every book they publish, but Landy seems to be one of them. Skulduggery Pleasant: Death Bringer is above and beyond what anyone could have expected. With one epic saga of a storyline and with characters who are growing to be ever shady-er, Death Bringer is an excellent novel. I can only hope that Landy continues to write so fantastically well.

- Vesuvius Blotch (Blotch's Reviews):

Death Bringer is my choice for the most emotionally harrowing book of the series. And that’s saying something. From an overall perspective, the storyline showcases the Necromancers at their best and most formidable, a brilliant core storyline surrounded and framed by a multitude of juicy plotlines. Perhaps the book’s greatest strength lies in the development of Skulduggery and Valkyrie as characters. Both endure hardships during the story’s events, and their relationship, which has stood the test of time, is pushed to its very limits. There’s a miscellany of excellent moments[, a] compelling story, a ton of character work and an emotional roller-coaster. Classic.
