= Skulduggery Pleasant: Mortal Coil =

2010 novel by Derek Landy

Mortal Coil
- Author: Derek Landy
- Cover artist: Tom Percival
- Language: English
- Series: Skulduggery Pleasant
- Genre: Children's novel, Fantasy novel, detective novel, comedy novel, adventure novel
- Publisher: HarperCollins
- Publication date: 2 September 2010
- Publication place: (Republic of Ireland) Ireland
- Media type: Print (hardcover)
- Pages: 571 pp (first edition, hardback)
- ISBN: 0-00-73773-12 (first edition, hardback)
- OCLC: 754058493
- Preceded by: Dark Days (2010)
- Followed by: Death Bringer (2011)

Skulduggery Pleasant: Mortal Coil is a young adult fantasy novel written by Irish playwright Derek Landy and published in September 2010. It is the fifth of the Skulduggery Pleasant series and the sequel to Skulduggery Pleasant: Dark Days, marking the first time two novels in the series had been released in one year.

The story follows the sorcerer-detectives Valkyrie Cain and Skulduggery Pleasant as Valkyrie fights to prevent her dark destiny and Remnants seek to fulfil it. The book would not see release in the US and Canada until 2018. HarperCollins Audio also publishes the unabridged CD sets of the books read by Rupert Degas.

== Plot summary ==
A group of necromancers agree that Valkyrie Cain is the prophesied Death Bringer, also known as Darquesse, and decide to read the future to learn more about her fate.

Skulduggery and Valkyrie capture the traitor Davina Marr, who destroyed the Sanctuary in the previous book. Valkyrie then visits her dead uncle to ask how to control her True Name, Darquesse, and is advised to visit a banshee.

When a necromancer uses a Remnant to possess a fortune-teller and see Valkyrie's future, the Remnant realises the importance of Valkyrie becoming Darquesse and goes to gather more Remnants, with the goal of controlling her. Meanwhile, Valkyrie visits vampire Caelan, who has a romantic interest in her.

At Christmas, Valkyrie sneaks away from her family to board a black carriage, as she was instructed by a banshee. Once in the carriage, her body dies, and she is taken to the mysterious Dr. Nye who gives her the ability to control her True Name by carving symbols into her heart. Nye refuses to let Valkyrie return to the land of the living, but she escapes using necromancy. Afterwards, she reveals to Skulduggery that she is Darquesse.

As more allies and enemies are possessed by Remnants, Valkyrie and her friends plan to activate a Soul-Catcher to capture the Remnants. They find the Soul-Catcher's key, but are gradually possessed and fight among themselves. When Valkyrie is possessed she momentarily becomes Darquesse, embarking on a killing spree until Skulduggery convinces her to destroy the Remnant inside her. The Soul-Catcher is activated and all the remnants are captured except for one, which possesses Tanith Low and flees the scene.

Valkyrie's boyfriend Fletcher apologises for attacking her while possessed, but Valkyrie continues to be interested in Caelan. Later, the possessed Tanith visits Valkyrie to tell her that she plans to help Valkyrie reach her destiny as Darquesse.

== Characters ==
=== Remnants ===
Remnants are beings of anger and hate that dream of a world of death where they do not have to hide in human bodies. They worship Darquesse as their messiah.

=== Dr. Nye ===
Dr. Nye is a genderless creature that assists Valkyrie in sealing her True Name.

=== Darquesse ===
Darquesse is the True Name of Valkyrie Cain, and the foretold cause of the end of the world.

== Reviews ==
Skulduggery Pleasant: Mortal Coil opened to largely positive reviews by critics.

- Bernice Harrison (The Irish Times):

The latest instalment in the Skulduggery series is everything Landy's fans have come to expect: tense, funny and – this is the crucial thing about the writer – magical[,] Landy is above all a superb storyteller with an imagination as full of glittering nuggets as King Solomon's Mines, and Mortal Coil is as thrilling, compelling and downright smart as its four predecessors.

- Alys Tandle (AlysTheBookWork.com)

[T]his book really deserves five stars, but it can't be read and understood without the others, so it only gets four. Sometimes I really dislike Derek Landy. He seems to punish my favourite characters the most, but I suppose that means that they're his favourites too.

- Joseph Melda (The Book Zone):

Derek Landy treats us to more nail-biting scene after nail biting scene, some of which had me completely stumped as to how our heroes would escape death, or something worse, and as for the final climactic scene....... you will just have to read it for yourself, but I have a very strong feeling it will shock you.

- Rhys Wolfgang (ThirstForFiction):

Story-wise, Mortal Coil really steps up from Dark Days[, with] plenty of twists and turns[...] while keeping it short and not dragging on. The last few pages were incredibly cinematic, and I could visualise the credits rolling after I finished the last word.

- Scott Wilson (The Fringe Magazine):

[T]here isn't any lack of witty banter and humour in this book and I found myself laughing a lot despite the darker tone. Whether it's the genuine laugh out loud funny parts or just the one liners and conversation from Skulduggery and Valkyrie, there's plenty to make you laugh.
