= Demon Road =

Novel series by Derek Landy

- Cover art of the trilogy
- Author: Derek Landy
- Illustrator: Alan Clarke
- Country: Ireland
- Language: English
- Genre: Adventure; Horror; Road trip
- Publisher: HarperCollins (English); Loewe Verlag (German)
- Published: August 27, 2015 (Demon Road); March 31, 2016 (Desolation); August 25, 2016 (American Monsters)
- Media type: Print (hardcover and paperback), audiobook, e-book

The Demon Road Trilogy, or simply Demon Road, is a horror-adventure-road trip trilogy of novels published by HarperCollins from 2015 to 2016. Written by Derek Landy and illustrated by Alan Clarke, the novel follows the journey of 16-year-old cursed demon girl Amber Lamont and her amnesiac guide Milo Sebastian, fleeing a family who wishes her dead, as they and passerby Glen travel the titular "demon road", on which exists all manner of supernatural beings from whom all horror fiction antagonist creators were subconsciously inspired by to create (primarily the villains of the works of Stephen King and 1980s slasher film villains in the first novel, from which Milo depicted as having been the "real" driver of Christine, with the second and third novels expanding to introduce versions of the Scooby-Doo gang, The Purge, The X-Files, and It Follows' entity). It consists of the novels The Demon Road Trilogy: Demon Road (originally known simply as Demon Road, and internationally as The Demon Road Trilogy: Hell and Highway), The Demon Road Trilogy: Desolation, and The Demon Road Trilogy: American Monsters (known in some regions as The Demon Road Trilogy: Infernal Finale).

Originally receiving a nine-book order from HarperCollins, Landy elected to conclude the series after its first trilogy in 2016 with Desolation and American Monsters, deciding to use the remaining six-book order to launch a sequel series to his previous book series, Skulduggery Pleasant, established to be set in the same shared fictional multiverse as Demon Road via Easter eggs throughout the trilogy. Demon Road has received a mixed to positive critical reception.

== Synopsis ==
Demon Road revolves around Amber, a seemingly ordinary 16-year-old YA fangirl from Florida who, after a shocking encounter, discovers a dark and twisted family secret: that her parents, their friends, and she herself are demons, out for her blood to fulfil a violent pact with a creature known as the Shining Demon. Forced to run for her life, Amber finds herself under the protection of Milo, a quiet, sarcastic and mysterious man driving a Dodge Charger, which seems to be alive. Tagging along for the ride is Glen, an annoying road trip companion from Hell, who has come to America from Ireland after being told he has forty days to live. Forced to flee across the United States of America via the eponymous Demon Road, from which all horror fiction is derived, the trio find themselves facing demonic and otherworldly dangers as they search for a way to stop Amber's parents; undead serial killers (Dacre Shanks, a parody/"real version" of Freddy Krueger), vampires, servants of hell, and the ebony-horned and red-skinned demons relentlessly hunting the trio.

In Desolation, Amber and Milo seek out sanctuary in the Alaskan town of Desolation Hill, a demon-free stop on the Demon Road where each yet the "real" version of the Purge takes place on its citizens being infused with demonic power; the Devil is also depicted as a monk in the likeness of Neil Patrick Harris, who allows for Amber to escape Hell, with Amber also crossing paths with a van-travelling group of mystery investigators/monster hunters (a parody/"real version" of the Scooby-Doo gang), forming a romance with one named Kelly (a parody/"real version" of Daphne).

In American Monsters, a selection of men in black (a parody/"real version" of The X-Files) founded by Amber's brother are revealed to be engaged in civil war.

== Development ==
In October 2015, ahead of the German language release of Demon Road, Carsten Biernat of Unique Voodoo Studios revealed that the institution had been commissioned to create the cover of the German version of the novel, sharing concept sculptures of Amber in her demon form they had created on being asked to "bring the character to life". In April 2016, Derek Landy and Unique Voodoo expressed interest in the concept models being produced as Demon Road collectable merchandise.

Promoting Desolation, elaborating on the series' premise of travelling the titular "Demon Road" from which all "the shining stars of horror [fiction], both on the page and on the screen" is derived, as "the perfect opportunity to tip my hat to Stephen King[,] Wes Craven[,] and a host of other creators", Landy described the trilogy as "a love letter to American horror, books, TV, comics, movies [where] every few chapters there’s a new character with a new story and each one of these encounters is a different trope of American horror. It’s Stephen King books, it’s Wes Craven movies… [for example] the Dacre Shanks character is influenced by Freddy Krueger[…] It meant it could be a litany of horror tropes[…] Over the course of the three books, there’ll be a Nightmare On Elm Street, there’ll be X-Files, there’ll be Buffy, there’ll be [more] Stephen King, Psycho… everything I loved as a horror fan is all in this series."

== Reception ==
Louisa Mellor of Den of Geek praised reading Demon Road as "like binge-watching an exciting Netflix series", expressing interest in a potential future television adaptation of the series. Track of Words described Demon Road as "a classic young adult chase novel[...] great fun [which] demonstrates Landy’s skill with world building and storytelling".

Angel Reads praised the "writing style [a]s easy to read and simple[...] nothing hard about it and even teens on the younger side will be able to read Demon Road. I loved the wit[…] the dialogue was sharp and hit you right in the chest, and it was different and fun", referring to "the characterisation of Landy characters [as] fun, different and bright", before concluding that "Demon Road was a fun, sassy and gruesome read [t]hat showed that sometimes the outside of people can be deceiving [and] that sometimes people can be good and evil all at the same time." Heart Full of Books meanwhile called Demon Road "the perfect mix of Percy Jackson and the TV show ‘Supernatural’[…] pacy and a little gory, [concluding] if you’re up for that, then I would definitely give it a go." Paper Fury similarly compared Demon Road to Supernatural, lauding its "snortingly good humour" and "fast moving wickedly captivating action scenes."
