= Skulduggery Pleasant: Playing with Fire =

2008 novel by Derek Landy

Playing with Fire
- Author: Derek Landy
- Cover artist: Tom Percival
- Language: English
- Series: Skulduggery Pleasant
- Genre: Children's novel, Fantasy novel, detective novel, comedy novel, adventure novel
- Publisher: HarperCollins
- Publication date: 1 April 2008
- Publication place: (Republic of Ireland) Ireland
- Media type: Print (hardcover)
- Pages: 351 pp (first edition, hardback)
- ISBN: 0-00-72570-58 (first edition, hardback)
- OCLC: 877986693
- Preceded by: Skulduggery Pleasant (2007)
- Followed by: The Faceless Ones (2009)

Skulduggery Pleasant: Playing with Fire is a young adult and fantasy novel written by Irish playwright Derek Landy, published in April 2008. It is the second of the Skulduggery Pleasant series and sequel to the novel of the same name.

The story follows sorcerer-detectives Valkyrie Cain and Skulduggery Pleasant and their magic-wielding allies as they try to prevent Baron Vengeous and his forces from resurrecting the Grotesquery and returning the Faceless Ones to the world. The book did not see release in the US and Canada until 2018. HarperCollins Audio also publishes the unabridged CD sets of the books read by Rupert Degas.

In 2009, it won the award of Senior Irish Children's Book of the Year.

== Characters ==
=== Baron Vengeous ===
A war criminal and one of Skulduggery's old enemies, determined to bring the Faceless Ones back into the world.

=== Billy-Ray Sanguine ===
The eyeless, straight razor-wielding Sanguine breaks The Baron out of prison using his digging abilities.

=== The Grotesquery ===
The Grotesquery is a monster made of the remains of a Faceless One and is capable of opening a portal for the Faceless Ones to return. It was revived using Lord Vile's armour and Valkyrie Cain's blood.

== Reviews ==
Skulduggery Pleasant: Playing with Fire has opened to largely positive reviews by critics.

- Jill Murphy (The Book Bag)

The continuing adventures of the skeleton detective and his sidekick are as full of action and terrible one liners as ever. There's a line of wry humour in these books which raise them way above the average bar.

- Fergus (Squishy Minnie):

All in all, I feel as though I could talk for five hours about this novel. It was a complete success, and I enjoyed every moment of it. Skulduggery is hilarious, Valkyrie is completely strong in both a physical and mental sense, and the perfect combination of humour, heart and horror cements Playing with Fire as my favourite Skulduggery Pleasant novel to date.

- Nathan Nicholls (Whitby Gazette):

The plot speeds along amid a whirl of chases, last-tick rescues, one high casualty melée after another and plenty of snappy, hard-boiled dialogue. Landy gives the term “deadpan humor” a whole new meaning; readers who prefer their heroes laconic and their action nonstop are in for a wild ride.

- Marya Jansen-Gruber (Through the Looking Glass):

The action is fast paced, the characters reveal interesting facts about themselves as the story unfolds, and readers will be hard pressed to find a more unique and surprising book.

- Karissa (Hidden In Pages):

If you are looking for a fast-paced, humorous, dark fantasy read I would recommend checking this out. It's a fun read with some neat magic in it.

== Awards ==
In 2009, Skulduggery Pleasant: Playing with Fire was awarded the title of Irish Senior Children's Book of the Year.
