= Skulduggery Pleasant: Dark Days =

2010 novel by Derek Landy

Dark Days
- Author: Derek Landy
- Cover artist: Tom Percival
- Language: English
- Series: Skulduggery Pleasant
- Genre: Fantasy novel, detective novel, comedy novel, adventure novel
- Publisher: HarperCollins
- Publication date: 1 April 2010
- Publication place: (Republic of Ireland) Ireland
- Media type: Print (hardcover)
- Pages: 415 pp (first edition, hardback)
- ISBN: 0-00-73471-62 (first edition, hardback)
- OCLC: 668251759
- Preceded by: The Faceless Ones (2009)
- Followed by: Mortal Coil (2010)

Skulduggery Pleasant: Dark Days is a young adult and fantasy novel written by Irish playwright Derek Landy, published in April 2010. It is the fourth of the Skulduggery Pleasant series and sequel to The Faceless Ones.

The story follows sorcerer-detective Valkyrie Cainas she attempts to track down the original skull of her mentor, Skulduggery Pleasant, and rescue him from the world of the Faceless Ones. A team of previously significant villains returns, joining forces to get their revenge upon the pair. The book did not see release in the US and Canada until 2018. HarperCollins Audio also publishes the unabridged CD sets of the books read by Rupert Degas.

== Plot summary ==
Valkyrie Cain and her friends have been searching for Skulduggery's skull for almost a year, during which time Valkyrie has been learning necromancy, a magic frowned upon by the other elemental magic users.

Villain Dreylan Scarab is released from prison and creates the 'Revengers' Club' with several villains from the previous books.

Valkyrie tracks down Skulduggery's skull and uses her necromancy powers to steal it from its new owner, Sanctuary detective Davina Marr. Valkyrie and her friends then use the skull to rescue Skulduggery from the realm he was trapped in.

While investigating the Revengers' Club, Valkyrie and Skulduggery are shown a vision of the future in which a woman called Darquesse destroys the world. At home, Valkyrie's parents tell her that her mother is pregnant. Meanwhile, the Revengers’ Club infiltrates the Sanctuary to steal a bomb.

With the help of Myron Stray - a man whose life was ruined when his True Name was revealed - Valkyrie and Skulduggery find the villains' lair and retrieve the bomb. However, the Revengers' Club has made a duplicate of the bomb, and reveal their plot to blow up a stadium and kill thousands of people. Valkyrie and her friends race to the stadium and Fletcher manages to teleport the duplicate bomb to the ocean, where it explodes safely. The Sanctuary arrests some of the Revengers' Club, but are then betrayed by Davina Marr, who uses Myron's True Name to force him to blow up the Sanctuary with the original bomb.

The story ends with Valkyrie dreaming of an earlier adventure in which she glimpsed the Book of Names, and realises she's known her True Name all along: Darquesse.

== Characters ==
=== Fletcher Renn ===
Fletcher Renn is Valkyrie's boyfriend, as well as the last known teleporter.

=== Dreylan Scarab ===
Dreylan Scarab is a powerful sorcerer and assassin, who seeks revenge after being framed for murder.

=== The Revengers' Club ===
The Revengers' Club is led by Dreylan Scarab, with the goal of destroying the Sanctuary.

== Reviews ==
Skulduggery Pleasant: Dark Days has opened to largely positive reviews by critics.

- Alys Tandle (AlysTheBookWork.com)

Landy has a talent for balancing his stories with just the right amount of light and dark, but as the title suggests, things are heading down the path of darkness. Dark Days indeed.

- Jessica Alben (Danville Public Library):

This series has always been a lot of fun. Pleasant’s dry humor is spot-on and unlike the Harry Potter series (which also famously involves a child who learns about the magical world and his place in it), this is a little more grim from the get-go.

- Joseph Melda (The Book Zone):

It contains all of the Derek Landy trademarks that we have come to love so much - great characters, both good and evil; tense action scenes that will have your heart beating so fast you will think it is about to explode; great dialogue laced with the scintillating banter that we have to come love so much; and, of course, many many moments of spine-tingling horror.

- Rhys Wolfgang (ThirstForFiction):

Dark Days moves towards a grittier, darker, perhaps more character driven story that will be enjoyed by teens and preteens alike. Derek Landy’s magical world continues to widen its boarders, and nearly every book seems to improve on the last.

- Leanne Hall (Readings.com):

This is smart, funny, contemporary fantasy that’s up there with the best, easily as good as the books of Cassandra Clare or Eoin Colfer.
