= Skulduggery Pleasant: Last Stand of Dead Men =

Novel by Derek Landy

Last Stand of Dead Men
- Author: Derek Landy
- Cover artist: Tom Percival
- Language: English
- Series: Skulduggery Pleasant
- Genre: Fantasy novel, detective novel, comedy novel, adventure novel
- Publisher: HarperCollins
- Publication date: 29 August 2013
- Publication place: Ireland
- Media type: Print (hardcover)
- Pages: 604 pp (first edition, hardback)
- ISBN: 0-00-75343-61 (first edition, hardback)
- OCLC: 869549346
- Preceded by: Kingdom of the Wicked (2012)
- Followed by: The Dying of the Light (2014)

Skulduggery Pleasant: Last Stand of Dead Men is a young adult and fantasy novel written by Derek Landy published in August 2013. It is the eighth book in the Skulduggery Pleasant series and the sequel to Skulduggery Pleasant: Kingdom of the Wicked.

The story follows sorcerer-detectives Valkyrie Cain and Skulduggery Pleasant as they work to uncover the conspiracy behind the war between the Sanctuaries. Meanwhile, Valkyrie's alter-ego, Darquesse, is on the verge of bringing about the end of the world.

In 2013, Skulduggery Pleasant: Last Stand of Dead Men won the Senior Irish Children's Book of the Year, and was released in the US and Canada in 2018. HarperCollins Audio published the unabridged audio book, read by Rupert Degas.

== Plot summary ==
Sanctuary detective Valkyrie Cain visits a witch, and learns that a dark warlock named Charivari is recruiting witches for an approaching war. Afterwards, Valkyrie and her family celebrate her eighteenth birthday.

Supreme Council members are discovered in the Irish Sanctuary attempting to destroy the Accelerator, a device that temporarily heightens sorcerers' powers. Valkyrie investigates a mysterious man with golden eyes, and learns that he could be using magic crystals to erase himself from people's memories. Skulduggery and Valkyrie realise that the man could have been using a crystal held in the Sanctuary, meaning he could be someone they know.

Skulduggery reforms his group 'The Dead Men', with Valkyrie as a new member. They plan to shut down the Accelerator, which left unchecked will cause an explosion of magic that will cause the end of humanity. The Irish Grand Mage, Ravel, kills some of the Dead Men and is revealed to be the man with golden eyes, who plots to rule over humans using the power of the Accelerator.

Skulduggery and Valkyrie witness a vision of the future, in which Valkyrie's evil alter-ego Darquesse kills Valkyrie's family. Valkyrie returns home, and learns that her reflection Stephanie (a copy of her that lives out her 'normal' life while she is on adventures) has killed Valkyrie's cousin. They fight, but Valkyrie is forced to flee when her parents arrive.

The Supreme Council plots to assassinate sorcerers associated with the Irish Sanctuary, including Fletcher Renn, Valkyrie's ex-boyfriend. When he is kidnapped and Valkyrie goes to rescue him, she is captured and tortured by the Brides of Blood Tears. Valkyrie unwillingly transforms into Darquesse and uses her necromancy powers to kill all the Brides. Skulduggery rescues Fletcher, but Darquesse flies away.

Fletcher talks to Stephanie, and the two end up kissing. Stephanie introduces herself to Skulduggery, asserting herself as an independent person. Skulduggery threatens to kill her for murdering Valkyrie's cousin, but lets her live in order to not disrupt Valkyrie's 'normal' life.

Skulduggery and some of his allies are captured by Ravel, and a battle ensues. Stephanie fights Charivari and kills him. Darquesse joins the battle and defeats Ravel, cursing him to live in agony. Before Darquesse vanishes, she tells the others that Valkyrie is gone.

The new Grand Mage orders Skulduggery to apprehend Darquesse. Skulduggery recruits Stephanie, who is eager for the opportunity to kill Darquesse.
