= List of awards and nominations received by Anya Taylor-Joy =

Anya Taylor-Joy awards and nominations
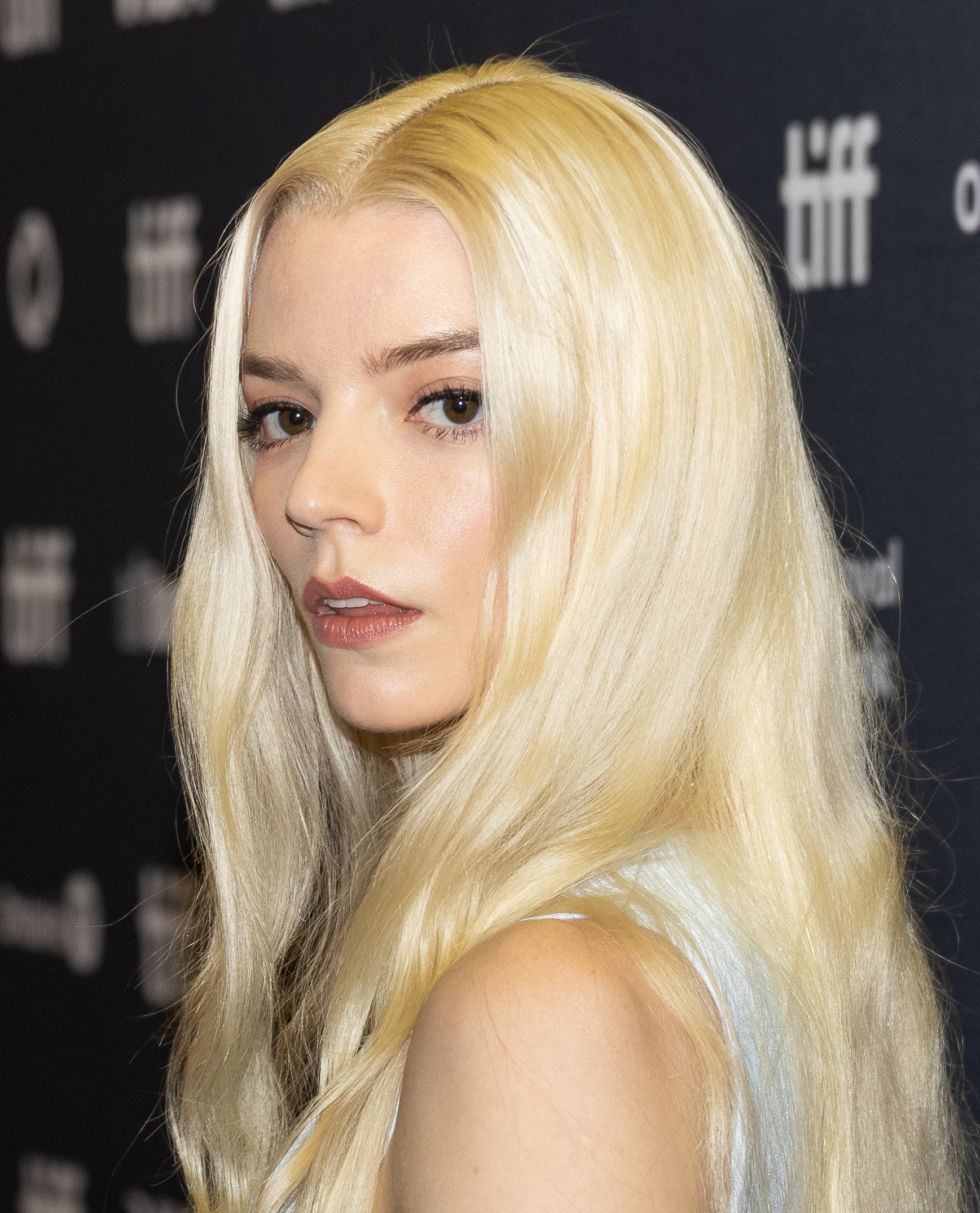
- Taylor-Joy in 2025
Awards and nominations
Award	Wins	Nominations
Primetime Emmy Awards	0	1
Golden Globe Awards	1	3
Screen Actors Guild Awards	1	1

Totals (Note: Certain award groups do not simply award one winner. They acknowledge several different recipients, have runners-up, and have third place. Since this is a specific recognition and is different from losing an award, runner-up mentions are considered wins in this award tally. For simplification and to avoid errors, each award in this list has been presumed to have had a prior nomination.)
- Wins: 15
- Nominations: 47

Anya Taylor-Joy (born 16 April 1996) is an actress and model, who has received several accolades, including an Actor Award, a Critics' Choice Television Award, and a Golden Globe Award as well as a nomination for a Primetime Emmy Award.

Taylor-Joy made her debut in the fantasy series Atlantis (2015), and had her breakthrough for starring as Thomasin in the horror film The Witch (2015), which earned her the Empire Award for Best Newcomer and a nomination for the Saturn Award for Best Performance by a Younger Actor. She starred in the psychological horror films Split (2016) and Glass (2019), and Lily Reynolds in the black comedy Thoroughbreds (2017). In 2017, she earned a nomination for the BAFTA Rising Star Award, and won the Trophée Chopard at the Cannes Film Festival.

Taylor-Joy garnered praise for her roles as Emma Woodhouse in the Autumn de Wilde directed comedy-drama film Emma. (2020) and Beth Harmon in the Netflix coming-of-age period drama miniseries The Queen's Gambit (2020). For Emma., she earned nominations for the Golden Globe Award for Best Actress – Motion Picture Comedy or Musical and the Satellite Award for Best Actress – Motion Picture. For The Queen's Gambit, she won the Golden Globe Award for Best Actress – Miniseries or Television Film, the Critics' Choice Television Award for Best Actress in a Movie/Miniseries and the Screen Actors Guild Award for Outstanding Actress in a Television Movie or Miniseries.

She played an aspiring singer in the 1960s in the Edgar Wright directed psychological horror film Last Night in Soho (2022) for which she was nominated for the Best Actress in a Horror Movie. She played the title role of Furiosa in the George Miller directed post-apocalyptic action epic Furiosa: A Mad Max Saga (2024) for which she was nominated for the Best Actress in an Action Movie. She played a working class woman who attends a mysterious and exclusive dinner in the Mark Mylod directed comedy horror thriller The Menu (2022) for which she was nominated for the Golden Globe Award for Best Actress in a Motion Picture – Musical or Comedy.

== Major associations ==
=== Actor Awards ===
Year	Category	Work	Result	Ref.
2020	Outstanding Actress in a Miniseries or Television Movie	The Queen's Gambit	Won	

=== Critics' Choice Awards ===
Year	Category	Work	Result	Ref.
Critics' Choice Television Awards
2020	Best Actress in a Movie/Miniseries	The Queen's Gambit	Won	
Critics' Choice Super Awards
2022	Best Actress in a Horror Movie	Last Night in Soho	Nominated	
2025	Best Actress in an Action Movie	Furiosa: A Mad Max Saga	Nominated	

=== Emmy Awards ===
Year	Category	Work	Result	Ref.
Primetime Emmy Awards
2021	Outstanding Lead Actress in a Limited Series or Movie	The Queen's Gambit	Nominated	

=== Golden Globe Awards ===
Year	Category	Work	Result	Ref.
2020	Best Actress in a Motion Picture - Comedy or Musical	Emma.	Nominated	
2020	Best Actress in a Miniseries or Television Film	The Queen's Gambit	Won	
2022	Best Actress in a Motion Picture - Comedy or Musical	The Menu	Nominated	

== Miscellaneous awards ==
Year	Award	Category	Nominated work	Result	Ref.
2016	Gotham Awards	Breakthrough Actor	The Witch	Won	
2016	London Critics Circle	Young British/Irish Performer of the Year	The Witch	Nominated	
2016	Washington D.C. Film Critics Association	Best Youth Performance	The Witch	Nominated	
2016	San Diego Film Critics Society	Breakthrough Artist	The Witch	Nominated	
2016	Austin Film Critics Association	Breakthrough Artist Award	The Witch	Nominated	
2016	Phoenix Film Critics Society	Breakthrough Performance	The Witch	Won	
2016	Fright Meter Awards	Best Actress in a Leading Role	The Witch	Won	
2016	Golden Shmoes Awards	Breakthrough Performance of the Year	The Witch	2nd Place	
2016	BloodGuts UK Horror Awards	Breakthrough Artist Award	The Witch	Nominated	
2016	IGN Summer Movie Awards	Best Movie Actress	The Witch	Nominated	
2016	International Online Cinema Awards	Best Actress	The Witch	Nominated	
2016	New Mexico Film Critics	Best Young Actress	The Witch	Won	
2017	Empire Awards	Best Female Newcomer	The Witch	Won	
2017	Saturn Awards	Best Performance by a Younger Actor	The Witch	Nominated	
2017	Fangoria Chainsaw Awards	Best Actress	The Witch	Won	
2017	Online Film & Television Association	Best Breakthrough Performance - Female	The Witch	Nominated	
2017	Seattle Film Critics Society	Best Youth Performance	The Witch	Won	
2017	Central Ohio Film Critics Association	Breakthrough Film Artist	Herself	Nominated	
2017	British Academy Film Awards	Rising Star Award	Herself	Nominated	
2017	Cannes Film Festival	Trophée Chopard	Herself	Won	
2018	BloodGuts UK Horror Awards	Best Supporting Actress	Split	Nominated	
2018	London Critics Circle	Young British/Irish Performer of the Year	Thoroughbreds	Nominated	
2020	Hollywood Critics Association	Best Actress	Emma.	Nominated	
2021	Indiana Film Journalists Association	Best Actress	Emma.	Nominated	
2021	Satellite Awards	Best Actress in a Motion Picture – Comedy or Musical	Emma.	Nominated	
2021	Satellite Awards	Best Actress in a Miniseries or TV Film	The Queen's Gambit	Nominated	
2021	IGN Awards	Best Dramatic Performance in a TV Series	The Queen's Gambit	Nominated	
2021	Time 100 Next	Phenoms	—N/a	Won	
2021	AACTA International Awards	Best Actress in a Series	The Queen's Gambit	Won	
2021	MTV Movie & TV Awards	Best Performance in a Show	The Queen's Gambit	Nominated	
2021	TCA Awards	Individual Achievement in Drama	The Queen's Gambit	Nominated	
2021	Hollywood Critics Association TV Awards	Best Actress in a Limited Series, Anthology Series, or Television Movie	The Queen's Gambit	Won	
2021	Online Film and Television Association	Best Actress in a Motion Picture, Limited or Anthology Series	The Queen's Gambit	Won	
2022	Dead Meat Awards	Best Supporting Performer	Last Night in Soho	Nominated	
2022	Hollywood Critics Association Midseason Film Awards	Best Supporting Actress	The Northman	Nominated	
2023	Hawaii Film Critics Society	Best Actress	The Menu	Nominated	
2024	Saturn Awards	Best Actress in a Film	The Menu	Nominated	
2024	Nickelodeon Kids' Choice Awards	Favorite Female Voice From an Animated Movie	The Super Mario Bros. Movie	Nominated	
2024	Astra Midseason Movie Awards	Best Actress	Furiosa: A Mad Max Saga	Runner-up	
2025	Astra TV Awards	Best Actress in a Limited Series or TV Movie	The Gorge	Nominated	
