= Christine (King novel) =

1983 novel by Stephen King

- First edition cover
- Author: Stephen King
- Cover artist: Craig DeCamps
- Language: English
- Genre: Horror
- Publisher: Viking
- Publication date: April 29, 1983
- Publication place: United States
- Media type: Print (Hardcover)
- Pages: 526
- ISBN: 978-0-670-22026-7

Christine is a horror novel by American writer Stephen King, published in 1983. It tells the story of a car (a 1958 Plymouth Fury) possessed by malevolent supernatural forces.

== Background ==
King has said that he got the inspiration for the story one night while driving, when he saw the numbers on his car's odometer go from 9999.9 to 10,000. This led him to the idea of an odometer that ran backwards, thus making the car "younger" instead of older.

== Synopsis ==
In the fictional Pittsburgh suburb of Libertyville, Pennsylvania, in 1978, nerdy teen Arnold "Arnie" Cunningham and his friend, Dennis Guilder, notice a dilapidated 1958 Plymouth Fury parked on a neglected lawn. The car is for sale: its owner, Roland D. LeBay, is a bitter old man with a back brace, who explains to Arnie that he has been forced to sell the car, which he refers to as Christine. Dennis warns Arnie against buying the car: it has a damaged engine block, cracked windscreen, flat tires: even the odometer runs backwards. Despite his friend's reservations, Arnie buys Christine for $250, having already fallen in love with the car. While Arnie finishes the paperwork, Dennis sits inside the Fury and experiences a psychic glimpse into its past. Frightened, Dennis decides he dislikes Christine.

Arnie brings Christine to a do-it-yourself garage run by small-time criminal Will Darnell, who is using the garage as a front for illicit operations. As Arnie begins to work on the car, his personality changes: he grows confident and his acne disappears, but he also becomes withdrawn, humorless and cynical; all attributes connected with LeBay. Soon after this, the two friends learn of LeBay's death. Dennis, curious and suspicious of LeBay's influence over Arnie, arranges a meeting with the old man's younger brother George, who reveals LeBay's history of anger and violence. He tells Dennis that LeBay's young daughter choked to death in Christine, and that his wife subsequently committed suicide in its front seat by carbon monoxide poisoning.

Dennis observes that Arnie is taking on LeBay's personality traits and dressing like a 1950s greaser. Arnie also becomes close to Darnell, acting as a courier in Darnell's smuggling operations. When Arnie has almost finished restoring Christine, he begins dating an attractive new student named Leigh Cabot. His parents, who disapprove of his activities, force him to keep Christine in an airport parking lot. Clarence "Buddy" Repperton, a bully who blames Arnie for his expulsion from school, learns where Christine is being kept and, together with his gang, destroys the car.

Arnie, who on some level knows that Christine is no ordinary car, pushes the ruined Fury through Darnell's garage, watching the odometer run backwards. Little by little, the damage begins to reverse. As soon as Christine is able to run, Arnie then drives her round and round the junkyard until she is fully restored. He strains his back in the process and begins wearing a back brace as LeBay did. During a date with Arnie, while riding in Christine, Leigh nearly chokes to death, and is saved only by the intervention of a hitchhiker. Leigh sees Christine's dashboard lights appear as glaring green eyes, watching her during the incident. Believing she and Christine are competing for Arnie's affection, Leigh vows to never get into the car again.

Darnell, Buddy, and all but one of his accomplices in the vandalism are killed in mysterious car-related incidents. The police link Christine to the murders, but no evidence is found on the car. State Police detective Rudolph Junkins grows suspicious of Arnie despite his alibis. Christine, possessed by LeBay's spirit, is committing these murders and then reversing the damage.

Leigh and Dennis become friends while unearthing details of Christine and LeBay's past. Arnie stumbles upon Leigh and Dennis together in Dennis' car, and is enraged. Soon after this, Junkins is killed in a car crash, run off the road by an unknown vehicle. Fearing they are to be the next targets, Dennis and Leigh devise a plan to destroy the car and save Arnie.

While Arnie is out of town, Dennis and Leigh lure Christine to the garage and batter her to pieces using a septic tanker truck. Dennis sees LeBay's spirit attempting to make him stop before the wreckage is crushed. Dennis learns that Arnie and his mother were both killed in a highway accident after Christine killed Arnie's father. Witness accounts lead Dennis to believe that LeBay's spirit, tied to Arnie through Christine, fled the car and attempted to possess Arnie, but Arnie fought him, causing the wreck. Dennis is informed by a police detective that Christine's remains were fed into the crusher in the back of the garage by two police officers, adding that one received a bad cut that needed stitches, and said "it bit him".

Four years later, Dennis and Leigh have ended their relationship. Dennis reads about a car accident in Los Angeles, in which a drive-in theater employee—the last surviving member of Buddy's gang—was killed by a car that smashed through a cinderblock wall. Dennis speculates that Christine may have rebuilt herself and is going after everyone who stood against her, saving him for last.

== Reception ==
Reviews for Christine were mixed, with The New York Times criticizing the effects as "creaky", the dialogue as "phony and manipulative", but acknowledging the authenticity of the 1950s atmosphere, and Kirkus Reviews describing it as over-long, but "popcorn-readable".

The American Library Association named Christine the 95th most banned and challenged book in the United States between 1990 and 1999.

== Adaptations ==
Eight months after the release of the novel, a film adaptation was released in December, directed by John Carpenter. It received generally positive reviews from critics and grossed $21 million at the box office. The film has since become a cult classic.

In 2003, Stephen King expressed dissatisfaction with the film of Christine, calling it: "...sort of boring. Speaking for myself, I'd rather have bad than boring." In June 2021, Sony Pictures Entertainment and Blumhouse Productions announced the development of a remake of the film with Bryan Fuller set to write and direct the film and Jason Blum, Vincenzo Natali and Steve Hoban producing.

== See also ==
- Killdozer!, 1944 science fiction novella written by Theodore Sturgeon
- "Sally", a 1953 short story by Isaac Asimov
- "You Drive", a 1964 episode of the original The Twilight Zone series
- "Trucks", a 1973 short story by Stephen King, featuring homicidal sentient trucks
- The Car, a 1977 horror film about a killer car
- The Twilight Zone: Season 2, Episode 15 "Joy Ride", aired 21 May 1987
- Star Trek: Voyager: Season 6, Episode 5 "Alice (Star Trek: Voyager)", aired 20 October 1999
- Futurama: Season 2, Episode 18 "The Honking" (2000)
- From a Buick 8 (2002), another novel by Stephen King about a mysterious car
- Black Cadillac, a 2003 film about a car that stalks its victims relentlessly
- Demon Road, a 2015 novel by Derek Landy featuring the "real" Christine and her driver as main characters
- "Route 666", a 2006 episode of Supernatural about a possessed truck
