= Skulduggery Pleasant: Kingdom of the Wicked =

2012 young adult novel by Derek Landy

Kingdom of the Wicked
- Author: Derek Landy
- Cover artist: Tom Percival
- Language: English
- Series: Skulduggery Pleasant
- Genre: Children's novel, Fantasy novel, detective novel, comedy novel, adventure novel
- Publisher: HarperCollins
- Publication date: 24 July 2012
- Publication place: (Republic of Ireland) Ireland
- Media type: Print (hardcover)
- Pages: 607 pp (first edition, hardback)
- ISBN: 0-00-74802-10 (first edition, hardback)
- OCLC: 829062124
- Preceded by: Death Bringer (2011)
- Followed by: Last Stand of Dead Men (2013)

Skulduggery Pleasant: Kingdom of the Wicked is young adult and fantasy novel written by Irish playwright Derek Landy, published in July 2012. It is the seventh of the Skulduggery Pleasant series and sequel to Skulduggery Pleasant: Death Bringer. The story follows sorcerer-detectives Valkyrie Cain and Skulduggery Pleasant as they investigate a group of people who have suddenly developed magic powers.

The book would not see release in the US and Canada until 2018. HarperCollins Audio also publishes the unabridged CD sets of the books, read by Rupert Degas.

== Plot summary ==
Sanctuary detectives Skulduggery Pleasant and Valkyrie Cain are tasked with tracking down a group of people who have mysteriously gained magic powers. One of them tells Skulduggery that he was given the powers in a dream, by a man called Argeddion.

Skulduggery and Valkyrie find a serial killer with the power to transport between dimensions, who helps lead them to Argeddion. After Valkyrie's arm is grabbed by the killer, she is also transported into another dimension, and is told that it is ruled by the evil sorcerer Mevolent.

Skulduggery realises that Argeddion has been imprisoned so that he doesn't use his powers. He and Valkyrie set off to visit the prison, the Cube. Skulduggery and Valkyrie plan to use the Cube to one day imprison Darquesse, Valkyrie's dangerous alter-ego who is destined to destroy the world.

A group of new magic users, Doran, Kitana, and Elsie, go to Doran's house, where he kills his older brother. Elsie sees that their powers are leading them to violence, and leaves the group. When Valkyrie and Skulduggery investigate the murder, they are attacked by Kitana, who steals Valkyrie's trademark jacket.

The Sanctuary plans to find the Sceptre of the Ancients and use it to erase Argeddion from existence. Meanwhile, Argeddion kills some of his new magic users after realising they have become too powerful.

Valkyrie is again transported into the alternate dimension, 'The Kingdom of The Wicked'. She and Skulduggery journey to Mevolent's palace, where they steal the Sceptre and rescue Valkyrie's reflection, Stephanie (a copy of Valkyrie that lives out her 'normal' life while she's on adventures).

Kitana helps the Council of Elders capture Aggredion, but then betrays them and attacks the Sanctuary. Skulduggery and Valkyrie transform into their alter-egos, Lord Vile and Darquesse, to defeat her. Darquesse is transported to the Kingdom of the Wicked during the battle, where she fights Mevolent and is almost killed before escaping to her own dimension. She kills Kitana, then battles Lord Vile. Skulduggery returns to his senses, and helps Valkyrie revert to her true self as well.

The novel ends with Skulduggery, Valkyrie, and the Council of Elders preparing for war. In the epilogue, Stephanie, who has secretly stolen the Sceptre, plots to murder Valkyrie and permanently take her place in her family.

== Reception ==
Patrick Wan, writing in SF's Crow's Nest, complimented the skilful use of cliffhangers, saying "[it's] almost impossible to put this book down."

In 2012, Kingdom of the Wicked was shortlisted for the Senior Irish Children's Book of the Year, losing to Artemis Fowl and the Last Guardian.
