= Skulduggery Pleasant: Resurrection =

2017 novel by Derek Landy

Resurrection
- First edition
- Author: Derek Landy
- Cover artist: Tom Percival
- Language: English
- Series: Skulduggery Pleasant
- Genre: Children's novel, Fantasy novel, detective novel, comedy novel, adventure novel
- Publisher: HarperCollins
- Publication date: 1 June 2017
- Publication place: Ireland
- Media type: Print (hardcover)
- Pages: 432 pp (first edition, hardback)
- Preceded by: The Dying of the Light (2014)
- Followed by: Midnight (2018)

Skulduggery Pleasant: Resurrection is a 2017 young adult fantasy novel by Derek Landy. It is the first book in the Skulduggery Pleasant sequel series, and tenth book in the franchise overall. In October 2019, at Easons' Department 51 at Liberty Hall, Dublin in a Q&A following an interview alongside Eoin Colfer, Landy confirmed the original title of Resurrection and the sequel series as a whole as Valkyrie Cain, after both series' main protagonist.

== Synopsis ==
The book takes place a five years after The Dying of the Light. In addition to continuing the story of the now 24-year-old Valkyrie Cain, the novel introduces Omen Darkly, a younger main character (included at Landy's publisher's request to make the series a little closer to a children's series) whose subplot storylines over the following six books satirises the Harry Potter series by J. K. Rowling, as Omen (inspired by Ron Weasley) stands aside while his "Chosen One" brother Auger (inspired by Harry Potter) has a series of misadventures with his friends, which include Omen's best friend Never (inspired by Hermione Granger).

Temper Fray is an agent who works for Skulduggery Pleasant who, having gone undercover to spy on the anti-sanctuary, a group of sorcerers who want to initiate war between mortals and sorcerers. He is captured by agents of the Anti-sanctuary, including Lethe, Azzedine Smoke, Memphis, Razzia, Cadaverous Gant and Destrier.

Skulduggery Pleasant then, once Temper is missing re-enlists Valkyrie Cain, who is staying at Grimwood House, her Uncle Gordon's former home.

Sebastian Tao then thinks to himself in Roarhaven that he needs to bring Darquesse back.

Valkyrie and Skulduggery then travel to Roarhaven, the magical city, where Corporal Yonder attempts to prevent their access to the High Sanctuary, before Seargent Larrup overrides Yonder and grants them access.

== Reception ==
The Times gave the audiobook a positive review, saying that the series is "witty and edgy" and enthralling.

The Irish Times gave the novel a mixed review saying that it is "very much reliant on fans’ knowledge of previous titles" and that while "existing fans will be delighted", Omen Darkly feels "slightly flat" and "the action- and dialogue-heavy scenes leave little room for thoughtful characterisation".

The Irish Independent gave the novel a positive review saying that the book "sizzles with whip-smart dialogue and dark humour galore" and that they "highly recommend" the book.
