= Skulduggery Pleasant (novel) =

Novel by Derek Landy

- Author: Derek Landy
- Cover artist: Tom Percival
- Language: English
- Series: Skulduggery Pleasant
- Genre: Children's novel, Fantasy novel, detective novel, comedy novel, adventure novel
- Publisher: HarperCollins
- Publication date: 3 April 2007
- Publication place: (Republic of Ireland) Ireland
- Media type: Print (hardcover)
- Pages: 368 pp (first edition, hardback)
- ISBN: 0-00-724161-5 (first edition, hardback)
- OCLC: 77012018
- Followed by: Playing with Fire (2008)

Skulduggery Pleasant (also known as Skulduggery Pleasant: Scepter of the Ancients, or simply The Scepter of the Ancients) is the debut novel of Irish playwright Derek Landy, published on 2 April 2007. It is the first of the Skulduggery Pleasant novels. The novel crosses the horror, comedy, mystery, and fantasy genres.

The story follows the characters Skulduggery Pleasant — a skeleton, sorcerer and detective — and his partner Stephanie Edgley, who also goes by Valkyrie Cain. They and their numerous magic-wielding allies try to prevent the necromancer Nefarian Serpine from unleashing a powerful weapon called The Sceptre of Ancients. The book was re-titled Sceptre Of The Ancients for the 2009 paperback release in the US and Canada. HarperCollins Audio also publishes the unabridged CD sets of the books read by Rupert Degas.

It won the Red House Children's Book Award and the Hampshire Book Award in 2008. Warner Bros. considered creating a live-action musical film based on the book, before Derek Landy bought back the rights.

== Plot summary ==
When horror novelist Gordon Edgley dies, his niece, Stephanie, is called out on his will. Present at the reading of the will is a man in an overcoat, hat, frizzy wig, sunglasses, and scarf, named Skulduggery Pleasant. Stephanie's none-too-well-liked uncle and aunt Fergus and Beryl are given a brooch, a boat, and a car (none of which they wanted), while her parents are left a villa in France. Stephanie herself is left with all of Gordon's remaining estate, including the royalties to his best-selling books, and a mansion filled with his possessions.

After visiting the mansion, Stephanie and her mother Melissa are stranded by car issues and a rainstorm. Melissa calls a tow truck and opts to return while letting Stephanie spend time in her new property. After reading some of her uncle's latest manuscripts (to be published posthumously), Stephanie receives a threatening phone call. The caller demands she hand over a "key". When she refuses, the man breaks in and tries to kill her. She is saved by Mr. Pleasant, who casts a fireball at the man. Upon discovering the man is impervious to flames, Pleasant shoots him with a gun, forcing him to flee the scene. During the fight, Skulduggery's disguise is knocked off, revealing him to be a skeleton held together by nothing but magic.

Upon realizing that her uncle was murdered and learning about the extensive nature of the secret world of mages and sorcerers, Stephanie decides to escape her previously tedious life and join this new one. She begins by helping Skulduggery investigate Gordon's death. Over the course of their search, Skulduggery and Stephanie uncover a greater plot for world domination by a previous general in the magical war in attempt to bring back the Faceless Ones. Stephanie's uncle unearthed an ancient weapon used by the first sorcerers, the Ancients, to defeat their tyrannical gods. He sealed this deadly weapon, the Sceptre of the Ancients, in a maze beneath his house. The "key" is in fact the brooch given to Fergus and Beryl.

Because of the power that can be held over people by sorcerers who know that person's real name, Stephanie starts going by Valkyrie Cain. Aided by boxer/tailor Ghastly Bespoke and the librarian/informant China Sorrows, Skulduggery and Stephanie meet with the strong Mr. Bliss and the professional swordswoman Tanith Low in the hopes that they can help keep the Sceptre away from Nefarian Serpine, who want to bring back their retired evil gods. Serpine, the originator of the plot and murder of Gordon, once served under the evil wizard Mevolent and worshiped the Faceless Ones. In an attempt to spread the evil religion and possibly bring back the Faceless Ones from their extra-dimensional banishment, Mevolent waged a secret war on the wizard community. Skulduggery opposed Mevolent in this war four hundred years ago, when he was still alive. He became ensnared in a trap Serpine set by murdering Skulduggery's wife and child, then suffered days of torture until he was finally killed by Serpine. Due to his extreme desire for revenge, rage and ties with unfinished business, Skulduggery resurrected himself. Now being made entirely out of bones, Skulduggery put himself back together and finished the war.

After a race against Serpine to find the Sceptre in the caves, Mr. Bliss betrays them, handing it to Serpine. Sagacious Tome, one of the Elders of the Magical Sanctuary that heads Ireland's wizard government, also reveals himself to be a traitor, and allows the two other Elders, Eachan Meritorious and Morwenna Crow, to be murdered by Serpine. Serpine invades the Sanctuary and enters the Repository, a storage of magical objects. Serpine's original plan was to use the Book of Names housed there to control the world, thus being able to simultaneously enforce Faceless One worship while searching unhindered for one who could show him how to bring them back. However the spell protecting the book is too strong, and only all three Elders' consent - or their deaths - would allow anyone to even approach it. In response to this, Serpine murders Tome. Mr. Bliss has been playing against Serpine all along, but is repelled when he tries to stop Serpine. Skulduggery and Stephanie, having snuck into the Sanctuary, witness the unfolding double and triple-crossing. Skuldggery attacks Serpine, with the Book of Names being destroyed in the ensuing struggle. Angered at his loss, Serpine tortures Stephanie with his Red Hand, but Skulduggery destroys him with the Sceptre, breaking its power in the process.

Skulduggery then offers to take Stephanie on as his assistant, partner, and student in sorcery. Stephanie, meanwhile, has discovered that her family are descendants of the Ancients and she herself has unknown magical abilities.

== Characters ==
=== Skulduggery Pleasant ===
In the novel, Skulduggery Pleasant is a 443-year-old skeleton detective, magician, and warrior. He fought against Mevolent under Grand Mage Meritorious during the secret war as one of the leaders, and is in a group called The Dead Men but was caught in a deadly trap by Nefarian Serpine under Mevolent's command. He killed Skulduggery's wife and child in front of him. Furious, Skulduggery grabbed a dagger to kill Serpine with, but Serpine had planned this, and the handle of the dagger was poisoned. Serpine tortured Skulduggery for a few days then killed him. After Skulduggery's death, his body was impaled on a spike and burned as an example to Mevolent's other enemies. Though as a result of a necromancer's experiment, Skulduggery did not move on after his death, but stayed and watched the war progress; to his horror, the tide turned and Mevolent gained advantage. In the books, Skulduggery's past life name (given name) has not been revealed, though author Derek Landy says his taken name was "Skulduggery Pleasant" before he died. Skulduggery accepts the sacrifice of individuals as a necessary part of war, but he is highly reluctant to allow this to happen to Stephanie (aka Valkyrie Cain). He protects her diligently throughout the novel.

Skulduggery has been a part of a group called The Dead Men, a group that consisted of Skulduggery Pleasant, Ghastly Bespoke, Erskine Ravel, Dexter Vex, Saracen Rue, Anton Shudder, and later in "Last Stand Of The Dead Men", Valkyrie Cain, Larrikin Fetter, Luke Skywalker and Tanith Low.

=== Stephanie Edgley (Valkyrie Cain) ===
Stephanie is a twelve-year-old girl, who, in the book, lives in the quiet Irish seaside town of Haggard. With the events of the books she is forced into maturing at a much faster pace. She is also the niece of Gordon Edgley, a recently deceased horror novelist, whose novels, she discovers, were not completely fictional. She first meets Skulduggery at Gordon's funeral; Gordon was a friend of Skulduggery. Skulduggery tells Stephanie how Gordon once described her as "strong-willed, intelligent, sharp-tongued, doesn't suffer fools gladly", traits Gordon himself possessed. Stephanie proves herself to have all these qualities in spades, clashing wits with Skulduggery and annoying him to no end. She refuses to be left behind by Skulduggery after he saves her, despite his advice that she keep out of danger. He later comes to respect her abilities, recognizing them when she herself does not. Stephanie despised her boring, ordinary life; she did not have anything in common with her peers, and though not disruptive at school, has a healthy disregard for authority. She takes great enjoyment in Skulduggery's more criminal escapades, such as breaking into a museum vault. She constantly proves herself to be every bit the equal of the adults, though some people underestimate her – her pet peeve is being called "child".

Though possessing no immediately obvious special abilities, other than fundamental running, swimming, and fighting instincts which help her out of trouble at the outset of the novel, Stephanie later learns she is a descendant of the Last of the Ancients, who was one of the first to discover magic. She begins to develop her magic skills, manipulating air in a climactic battle scene, and managing to create fire at the end of the novel. Skulduggery offers to help her master her magical abilities, so that she can assist him in adventures to come. Her main strengths, however, are her intelligence, her will and determination.

According to the novel's magical premise, knowing someone's given name gives you a limited amount of power over them. China Sorrows knows Stephanie's name, and uses this knowledge to prevent Stephanie from rescuing Skulduggery. Stephanie is thus forced to take on the name Valkyrie Cain. Taking this name seals her given name, keeping others from controlling her, and breaks China's hold on her, allowing her to save Skulduggery. Although known as Valkyrie by other characters from this point onwards, Landy continues to refer to her in the third-person as Stephanie in the first book, and Skulduggery chooses to call her Valkyrie. However, for the rest of the series, she is known as Valkyrie.

She was given her name from the Norse warrior women who, in-universe, guard Valhalla (she is familiar with the term, and even recognizes the "Ride of the Valkyries", when she is woken by it at her house), and she got her last name from the word Cain. Skulduggery Pleasant introduced the word to her, claiming that she had a "penchant for raising Cain", meaning that she makes trouble.

=== Tanith Low ===
Tanith Low is a master swordswoman who is first introduced within the text whenever the character is battling a troll on Westminster Bridge in the first book. Tanith does not work for the Elders (who are the leaders of the magical communities which are mainly divided by country), because she has a natural distrust of authority. Instead she merely, as Springheeled Jack says in 'Playing With Fire', "deals out what she calls justice". She is English and originally lived in London. Tanith Low's job is to apprehend or otherwise kill criminals and evil creatures who threaten national security.

Originally Derek Landy planned to kill off Tanith Low in the first book, but when he brought it to his editors they said it would be "too sad for the readers." So Derek Landy agreed that he would keep her alive as long as he can torture her in some way in every book she is in. Despite common belief, he does not hate Tanith Low, as he stated in his Down Under tour in Perth on 20 August 2012.

She befriends Valkyrie/Stephanie in Book 1. During a conversation with Valkyrie, Tanith expresses a desire for a little sister and she and Valkyrie develop an affectionate sisterly relationship. Valkyrie refers to Tanith as being like a sister to her in the fourth book. Tanith is also known to have an elder brother whom she states she 'loves to death'.

=== Nefarian Serpine ===
The villain of the first book, Serpine, is an evil sorcerer who once served under Mevolent as one of his Infamous Three Generals. He dabbles in necromancy. He accidentally destroys the Book of Names with the Sceptre, foiling his own scheme for the return of the Faceless Ones, and then attempts to kill Stephanie, but Skulduggery stops him and avenges the death of his family by turning Serpine to dust with the Sceptre.

Serpine is highly intelligent and a skilled manipulator who managed to persuade Sagacious Tome to join him. He is a fanatic who is believed by many (Skulduggery included) to be insane.

The greatest weapon in Serpine's arsenal is his Red Right Hand which has the dark power to cause individuals great pain, eventually killing them, when pointed at. He was taught this by High Priest Tenebrae after Serpine surrounded the necromancer's temple.

=== China Sorrows ===
China is magically beautiful, and her power is to make anyone fall in love with her at first sight. She is fluent in the language of magic and has hidden symbols all over her body and the library that she owns. She is quite secretive, but as time goes on Valkyrie gets to know her. China used to worship the Dark Gods (The Faceless Ones), as her whole family did (including Mr. Bliss, her brother). China helps Skulduggery and Valkyrie out many times, and has fought alongside them, though she calls herself neutral, stating '"I am loyal to one person only. That person is me.'" She is also perceived by Skulduggery as "not to be trusted".

=== Ghastly Bespoke ===
Ghastly Bespoke is a tailor and close friend of Skulduggery Pleasant. He makes clothes that were very hard to destroy and were of use to Valkyrie Cain and many other central characters.

== Reviews ==
Skulduggery Pleasant has opened to largely positive reviews by critics.

- April Spisak (Project MUSE)

The result is a rich fantasy that is as engaging in its creative protagonists and villains as it is in the lightning-paced plot and sharp humor.

- Phillip Ardagh (The Guardian):

It's exciting, pacy, nicely handled and it's fun. There's nothing worthy about it, and it's all the better for that. And, I might add, it's self-contained. Landy may well revisit these characters – I sincerely hope he does – but it's a pleasingly rounded tale, which is refreshing in these days of endless open-ended books of never-ending series.

- Nathan Nicholls (Whitby Gazette):

There is no expense spared by Landy in this book and I would have to say that everyone who could be bothered to read it, would definitely be drawn into it and certainly enjoy it. ... Something for everyone and everything for someone, Skulduggery Pleasant is easily my book of the year so far. Read it!

- Christina Hardyment (The Independent):

Landy is an established writer, and the combats between Skulduggery, Serpine and his legions of Hollow Men rival the climaxes of the Potter films for hair-raising effects; it isn't often that writing makes you feel as if you are watching a film.

- The Times:

Derek Landy's debut, Skulduggery Pleasant ... has a distinctly Horowitzian humour and verve to it, being a detective story featuring a sorcerer skeleton as hero.

== Awards ==
Skulduggery Pleasant has received the following accolades:

- 2008 - Won the Red House Children's Book Award
- 2008 - Received the American Library Association's (ALA) Amazing Audiobooks for Young Adults Award
- 2008 - Received the Odyssey Award for Excellent in Audiobook Production
- 2008 - Named one of the top ten books for young adults by the ALA
- 2008 - Received recognition as a Notable Children's Recording by the ALA
- 2008 - Won the Portsmouth Book Award
- 2009 - Won the Kernow Youth
- 2009 - Won the Grampian Book Awards
- 2008 - Finalist for the Mythopoeic Fantasy Award
- 2009 - Richard & Judy Children's Book Club recommended Skulduggery Pleasant for confident readers (9+)
- 2010 - Won Bord Gais Energy Irish Book of the Decade award
- Won the Bolton Children's Book Award
- Won the Staffordshire Young Teen Fiction Award.
