= Badgered =

- Directed by: Sharon Colman
- Written by: Sharon Colman
- Produced by: Jamie Wolpert
- Starring: Rupert Degas
- Edited by: Agnieszka Liggett
- Music by: Peter Gosling
- Release date: 23 February 2005
- Running time: 6 minutes
- Country: United Kingdom
- Language: English

Badgered is a 2005 animated short film, nominated on 31 January 2006 for the Academy Award for Best Animated Short Film. The film was written, animated and directed by Sharon Colman at the National Film and Television School and is voiced by Rupert Degas.

The film is about a solitary Eurasian badger who just wants to get some sleep. It attempts to make an environmental statement by showing the interaction between the badger and USA Trident nuclear missiles that are stored inside the hill in Scotland where the badger lives.

It was included in the Animation Show of Shows.
