= Derek Landy =

Irish author and screenwriter

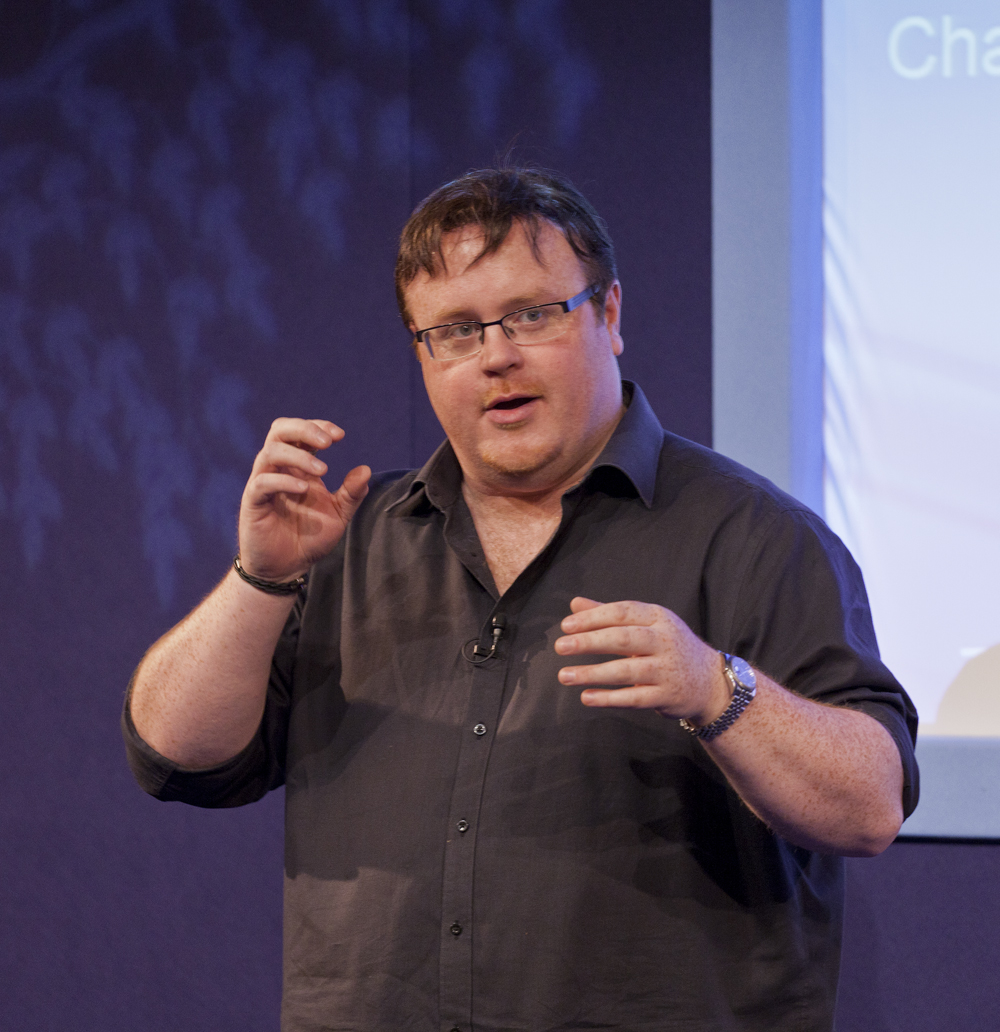
- Landy in Edinburgh, August 2011
- Born: Lusk, County Dublin, Ireland
- Writing career
- Genre: Children's fantasy
- Notable works: Skulduggery Pleasant and Demon Road series
- Notable awards: Red House Children's Book Award; 2008 Skulduggery Pleasant

Derek Landy is an Irish author and screenwriter, known for the Skulduggery Pleasant and Demon Road book series. Since 2018, he has also written numerous comic book series at Marvel Comics.

== Career ==
Landy has written two screenplays that have been made into films, the IFTA award-winning Dead Bodies and the IFTA-nominated Boy Eats Girl starring Samantha Mumba. Landy himself was nominated for an IFTA for Best Script for Dead Bodies.

Frustrated with the collaborative process of filmmaking, Landy moved on to writing the Skulduggery Pleasant series, starting with the novel of the same name. The novel was published by HarperCollins, who paid £1.8 million for the publishing rights, growing to comprise a nine-book series, a six-book sequel series, a spin-off, and a prequel, with a third (three-book) series in development.

In 2007, he signed a deal with Warner Bros. worth an estimated US$1.1 million for the rights to adapt his Skulduggery Pleasant series, which he intended to adapt himself. However, his script was constantly rewritten and Landy, unhappy with the results, bought back the rights. He sold the rights to another company which could not make it, then worked with another company that "petered out". As of 2020, he was working on an adaptation with an undisclosed film making company.

Landy is a fan of Joss Whedon's works, notably Buffy the Vampire Slayer, as well as Philip Pullman's His Dark Materials series. He is also a fan of Gilmore Girls and Doctor Who.

Landy wrote a short story based on the Tenth Doctor from Doctor Who as part of a short story collection celebrating the show's 50th anniversary. The story was published by Puffin in 2013, titled "The Mystery of the Haunted Cottage". Landy was consequentially hired to write an episode for the second series of the Doctor Who spinoff Class, only for the series to be cancelled before the episode he wrote could be produced.

== Personal life ==
Landy attended Drogheda Grammar School, and later studied animation at Ballyfermot College. He also has a black belt in kenpo karate. Prior to his contract with HarperCollins, he worked on his parents' vegetable farm. Since 2013, he has been dating Laura Jordan, a fellow writer from Sittingbourne, Kent, and they are now engaged. The couple lives in Dublin with their dog, ten cats, and a feral cat that keeps showing up at their window.

== Reception ==
In a review of his first book, Skulduggery Pleasant, Sarah Webb of the Irish Independent wrote that it "is taut, full of zippy dialogue and fantastical visuals".

=== Awards ===
In 2008, Landy won the Red House Children's Book Award. Playing with Fire, Mortal Coil and Last Stand of Dead Men each won the senior Irish Children's Book Award, in 2009, 2010 and 2013. In addition in 2010 Skulduggery Pleasant (Sceptre of the Ancients) was voted as Irish book of the decade.

== Bibliography ==
=== Skulduggery Pleasant series ===
==== First series (Phase 1) ====
- Skulduggery Pleasant (April 2007); US title Sceptre of the Ancients for distinction from the series name
- Playing With Fire (April 2008)
- The Faceless Ones (April 2009)
- Dark Days (April 2010)
- Mortal Coil (September 2010)
- Death Bringer (September 2011)
- Kingdom of the Wicked (August 2012)
- Last Stand of Dead Men (August 2013)
- The Dying of the Light (August 2014)

==== Second series (Phase 2) ====
- Resurrection (June 2017)
- Midnight (June 2018)
- Bedlam (May 2019)
- Seasons of War (April 2020)
- Dead or Alive (April 2021)
- Until the End (April 2022)

==== Third series (Phase 3) ====
- A Mind Full of Murder (March 2024)
- A Heart Full of Hatred (March 2025)
- A Soul Full of Shadows (March 2026)

==== From the World of Skulduggery Pleasant ====
- Tanith Low in... The Maleficent Seven (March 2013)
- Armageddon Outta Here (July 2014)
- Hell Breaks Loose (March 2023)
- Bad Magic: A Skulduggery Pleasant Graphic Novel (September 2023)
- The Haunted House on Hollow Hill (September 2024)
- A Small Matter Of Impending Catastrophe (October 2025)

=== The Demon Road Trilogy ===
- The Demon Road Trilogy: Demon Road (August 2015) (also titled The Demon Road Trilogy: Hell and Highway)
- The Demon Road Trilogy: Desolation (March 2016)
- The Demon Road Trilogy: American Monsters (August 2016) (also titled The Demon Road Trilogy: Infernal Finale)

=== Marvel Comics ===
Stories

- Marvel Comics #1000: "Deadpool Locked" (August 2019)

Comic series

- The Black Order: The Warmasters Of Thanos (November 2018–April 2019)
- The Falcon & the Winter Soldier: Cut Off One Head (February 2020–January 2021), tie-in
- Captain America/Iron Man: The Armor & The Shield (December 2021–May 2022)
- All-Out Avengers (September 2022–January 2023)
- Avengers: Beyond (March 2023–July 2023)
- The Infinity Watch (December 2024–May 2025)
- Doctor Strange of Asgard (March 2025–July 2025), tie-in
- Doctor Strange (December 2025-Present)

=== Miscellaneous ===
- Doctor Who: "The Mystery of the Haunted Cottage" (2013), short story
