= Skulduggery Pleasant: The Dying of the Light =

2014 novel by Derek Landy

The Dying of the Light
- First edition
- Author: Derek Landy
- Cover artist: Tom Percival
- Language: English
- Series: Skulduggery Pleasant
- Genre: Children's novel, Fantasy novel, detective novel, comedy novel, adventure novel
- Publisher: HarperCollins
- Publication date: 28 August 2014
- Publication place: (Republic of Ireland) Ireland
- Media type: Print (hardcover)
- Pages: 605 pp (first edition, hardback)
- ISBN: 0-00-74892-50 (first edition, hardback)
- OCLC: 36074312
- Preceded by: Last Stand of Dead Men (2013)
- Followed by: Resurrection (2017)

Skulduggery Pleasant: The Dying of the Light is young adult and fantasy novel written by Irish author Derek Landy, published in August 2014. It is the ninth and final of the first Skulduggery Pleasant series and follows to Skulduggery Pleasant: Last Stand of Dead Men.

The book was planned to be released in the US and Canada in 2018.

In 2014, The Dying of the Light was shortlisted for the Senior Irish Children's Book of the Year.

== Plot summary ==
The story follows the sorcerer and detective Skulduggery Pleasant after the loss of Valkyrie Cain, as he allies with his former protegé's murderous reflection to track down and stop Darquesse before she destroys the world.

== Critical response ==
Sarah Webb, writing for The Independent, said "With plot twists that had me gasping at Landy's audacity, whip-smart dialogue, and enough clever popular culture references to impress even the most jaded teenager, this is a world class book not to be missed.".
