= Skulduggery Pleasant =

Irish young adult novel series

- Covers of Skulduggery Pleasant books 1–9
- Author: Derek Landy
- Country: Ireland
- Language: English
- Genre: Children's literature; Young adult fiction; Urban fantasy
- Publisher: HarperCollins
- Published: 2007–2026
- Media type: Print (hardcover and paperback); Audiobook; eBook
- No. of books: 9 (Phase I); 6 (Phase II); 3 (Phase III); 9 (Anthology)

Skulduggery Pleasant is a series of dark fantasy novels written by Irish author Derek Landy. Tom Percival is the series' illustrator. The books revolve around the adventures of fledgling detective Valkyrie Cain and her mentor Skulduggery Pleasant, along with other friends and allies. The central story concerns Valkyrie's struggle to stop evil forces threatening the world and her internal struggle to resist the darkness within.

The novels are broken up into three phases with multiple prequels and short tales. Since the release of the first novel in 2007, Skulduggery Pleasant, the series has been praised by both readers and critics.

== History ==
The first novel was published in April 2007. The following novels were released each year afterward, with the exception of the fourth and fifth novels, Dark Days and Mortal Coil, which were both released in 2010. Landy was initially contracted to write three books, with any further books depending on how well the first trilogy sold. The success of the first novels ensured that the deal was extended first to six books and in 2011, HarperCollins signed the deal for the third and final trilogy. The final book in the first series was published in August 2014. The new books in the second series began to be published annually in June 2017.

The first three novels in the series were released in the United States by HarperCollins, but later entries in the series have not been published there, remaining available primarily in the United Kingdom, Ireland, and other international markets.

In July 2016, Derek Landy announced via a video blog that, although the first Skulduggery Pleasant series was complete, the series as a whole was still set to continue with a sequel series. The first book of this sequel was released in June 2017, titled Resurrection. While nine books were planned, the series was cut down to six books by HarperCollins after the publication of Seasons of War. The final book, Until the End, was released in April 2022. In October 2022, Landy announced via YouTube livestream that a "one-off prequel" and "Book 0·1", Hell Breaks Loose, would release in March 2023.

In September 2023, Derek Landy announced via Twitter that there would be a third phase consisting of three books of the Skulduggery Pleasant series. The first book of the new trilogy A Mind Full of Murder was published in March 2024, followed by A Heart Full of Hatred in 2025, and A Soul Full of Shadows in 2026.

In early March 2024, Derek Landy announced via Twitter that there would be a podcast, titled The Haunted House on Hollow Hill. It was released in the summer of 2024, containing six half-hour episodes, with audiobook, e-book and print versions coming out in September 2024. The printed version will be a cross between a book and a screenplay.

A number of supplementary short tales, taking place a few months after the plot of each book, were included with certain paperback releases, which also had fresh covers. In addition, Derek has been crafting many novellas that are longer than a full-length book, beginning in February 2012 with The End of the World. Tanith Low starred in the 2013 book The Maleficent Seven, which was released in March. A compilation of all previously released short stories as well as fresh material, titled Armageddon-Outta-Here, was released on 3 July 2014. Get Thee Behind Me, Bubba Moon, a short story that grew into a novella, was also featured. Another short story, Apocalypse Kings, was published in March 2021 in honor of World Book Day.

== Overview ==
| No. | Title | Publication date | Counts | ISBN |
|---|---|---|---|---|
First phase
| 1 | Skulduggery Pleasant | 3 April 2007 | 67,393 words / 384 pages | 978-0-06-123115-5 |
| 2 | Playing with Fire | 1 April 2008 | 69,683 words / 352 pages | 978-0-06-124088-1 |
| 3 | The Faceless Ones | 6 April 2009 | 69,689 words / 416 pages | 978-0-06-124091-1 |
| 4 | Dark Days | 1 April 2010 | 77,335 words / 416 pages | 978-0-00-732597-9 |
| 5 | Mortal Coil | 2 September 2010 | 104,000 words / 576 pages | 978-0-00-732601-3 |
| 6 | Death Bringer | 1 September 2011 | 118,000 words / 608 pages | 978-0-00-732603-7 |
| 7 | Kingdom of the Wicked | 30 August 2012 | 134,765 words / 608 pages | 978-0-00-748021-0 |
| 8 | Last Stand of Dead Men | 29 August 2013 | 164,848 words / 608 pages | 978-0-00-748923-7 |
| 9 | The Dying of the Light | 28 August 2014 | 159,149 words / 624 pages | 978-0-00-748928-2 |
Second phase
| 10 | Resurrection | 1 June 2017 | 111,323 words / 448 pages | 978-0-00-816902-2 |
| 11 | Midnight | 1 June 2018 | 104,443 words / 432 pages | 978-0-00-828460-2 |
| 12 | Bedlam | 30 May 2019 | 592 pages | 978-0-00-830396-9 |
| 13 | Seasons of War | 2 April 2020 | 560 pages | 978-0-00-838624-5 |
| 14 | Dead or Alive | 1 April 2021 | 608 pages | 978-0-00-838629-0 |
| 15 | Until the End | 14 April 2022 | 656 pages | 978-0-00-838635-1 |
Third phase
| 16 | A Mind Full of Murder | 28 March 2024 | 416 pages | 978-0-00-858582-2 |
| 17 | A Heart Full of Hatred | 27 March 2025 | 417 pages | 978-0-00-858593-8 |
| 18 | A Soul Full of Shadows | 26 March 2026 | 487 pages | 978-0-00-858599-0 |
Novellas / Stand-alone novels
| 6–7 | The End of the World | 23 February 2012 | 128 pages | 978-0-00-746677-1 |
| 7–8 | Tanith Low in... The Maleficent Seven | 28 March 2013 | 288 pages | 978-0-00-751237-9 |
| 8–9 | Armageddon-Outta-Here | 3 July 2014 | 480 pages | 978-0-00-755954-1 |
| 13–14 | Apocalypse Kings | 18 February 2021 | 96 pages | 978-0-00-846374-8 |
| 14–15 | The Skulduggery Pleasant Grimoire | 27 May 2021 | 416 pages | 978-0-00-847241-2 |
| 0–1 / 15–16 | Hell Breaks Loose | 5 April 2023 | 320 pages | 978-0-00-858603-4 |
| 15–16 | Bad Magic | 1 November 2023 | 144 pages | 978-0-00-858578-5 |
| 16–17 | The Haunted House on Hollow Hill | 26 September 2024 | 240 pages | 978-0-00-871655-4 |
| 16–17 | A Small Matter of Impending Catastrophe | 28 October 2025 | 240 pages | 978-0-00-877668-8 |

Release timeline Phase I in red, Phase II in green, Phase III in purple
| 2007 | Skulduggery Pleasant |
| 2008 | Playing with Fire |
| 2009 | The Faceless Ones |
| 2010 | Dark Days |
| 2010 | Mortal Coil |
| 2011 | Death Bringer |
| 2012 | The End of the World |
| 2012 | Kingdom of the Wicked |
| 2013 | The Maleficent Seven |
| 2013 | Last Stand of Dead Men |
| 2014 | Armageddon Outta Here |
| 2014 | The Dying of the Light |
2015
2016
| 2017 | Resurrection |
| 2018 | Midnight |
| 2019 | Bedlam |
| 2020 | Seasons of War |
| 2021 | Apocalypse Kings |
| 2021 | Dead or Alive |
| 2021 | Grimoire |
| 2022 | Until the End |
| 2023 | Hell Breaks Loose |
| 2023 | Bad Magic |
| 2024 | A Mind Full of Murder |
| 2024 | The Haunted House on Hollow Hill |
| 2025 | A Heart Full of Hatred |
| 2025 | A Small Matter of Impending Catastrophe |
| 2026 | A Soul Full of Shadows |

== Phase I novels ==
=== Skulduggery Pleasant (2007) ===
Stephanie Edgley's uncle died leaving her a fortune including his mansion. While staying there, she was attacked by a strange man and was rescued by Skulduggery Pleasant, a mysterious skeleton mage. Together with Ghastly Bespoke, China Sorrows, and Tanith Low, Stephanie and Skulduggery tried to stop a plot for world domination of Serpine, an evil sorcerer. Serpine wanted to rule the world with the Scepter of the Ancients, a weapon used to defeat the tyrannical gods called the Faceless Ones. Serpine was the murderer of Skulduggery and his family in a war four hundred years ago. But Skulduggery returned from death mysteriously as a living skeleton.

At Stephanie's uncle Gordon's house, Serpine attacks with Hollow Men and captures Skulduggery, hoping Skulduggery knows where the key to the caves of the void (caves under Gordon's house and where the Scepter is rumored to be) is. Stephanie goes to China Sorrows to see if she can get Skulduggery back, and China uses her given name against her. In desperation, Stephanie takes the name Valkyrie Cain (Valkyrie is a warrior woman, and Cain means trouble).

Valkyrie gets a team of Ghastly, Tanith, and two cleavers (Sanctuary police-army). They break into Serpine's Castle and extract Skulduggery. On the way in, Tanith sacrifices a cleaver so they can sneak past an army of Hollow Men. When they try to escape, Hollow men block their path. Tanith demonstrates an ability to walk on walls and ceilings and they escape with Skulduggery.

After obtaining the Scepter, Serpine created an immortal fighter called the White Cleaver. During a fight with the White Cleaver, Ghastly used magic to petrify himself to avoid being killed. Serpine then invaded the Sanctuary and killed two Elders with the help of the other traitorous Elder. He tried to use the Book of Names to control the World but all three Elders' consent was needed to read from it.

During the fight with Serpine in the Sanctuary, Stephanie glimpsed her True name in the Book of Names but could not remember it before the Book of Names was destroyed. Skulduggery destroyed Serpine with the Scepter, breaking the Scepter's power in the process. Afterward, Skulduggery offered to take Stephanie on as his assistant and apprentice because she is a descendant of the Ancients. Stephanie decided to take the name of Valkyrie Cain.

=== Playing with Fire (2008) ===
With Serpine dead, the world is safe once more. At least, that is what Valkyrie and Skulduggery think, until the notorious Baron Vengeous makes a bloody escape from prison, and dead bodies and vampires start showing up all over Ireland. With Baron Vengeous after the deadly armour of Lord Vile, and pretty much everyone out to kill Valkyrie, the daring detective duo face their biggest challenge yet. But what if the greatest threat to Valkyrie is just a little closer to home...?

=== The Faceless Ones (2009) ===
As a number of teleporters are mysteriously murdered, Valkyrie and Skulduggery learn quickly that it is linked to a fanatical cult named the Diablerie, who seek to open a portal with the goal of returning the Faceless Ones to the world. With the assistance of cocky young teleporter Fletcher Renn, Valkyrie and Skulduggery have very little time to track down a mysterious man named Batu, stop the Diablerie, and prevent the return of the Faceless Ones. This one will have deadly consequences. Do panic. They are coming.

=== Dark Days (2010) ===
Skulduggery Pleasant is gone, sucked into a parallel dimension overrun by the Faceless Ones. If his bones have not already been turned to dust, chances are he's insane, driven out of his mind by the horror of the ancient gods. There is no official, Sanctuary-approved rescue mission. There is no official plan to save him. But Valkyrie's never had much time for plans. The problem is, even if she can get Skulduggery back, there might not be much left for him to return to. There's a gang of villains bent on destroying the Sanctuary, there are some very powerful people who want Valkyrie dead, and as if all that was not enough it looks very likely that a sorcerer named Darquesse is going to kill the world and everyone on it. Skulduggery is gone. All our hopes rest with Valkyrie. The world's weight is on her shoulders, and its fate is in her hands. These are dark days indeed.

=== Mortal Coil (2010) ===
Skulduggery Pleasant and Valkyrie Cain are back — just in time to see their whole world get turned upside down! While they struggle to protect a known killer from an unstoppable assassin, Valkyrie is on a secret mission of her own. This quest, to prevent her dark and murderous destiny, threatens to take her to the brink of death and beyond. And then the body-snatching Remnants get loose, thousands of twisted souls who possess the living like puppets, and they begin their search for a being powerful enough to lead them. Facing such insurmountable odds, Skulduggery, Valkyrie, Ghastly and Tanith can trust no one. Not even each other!

=== Death Bringer (2011) ===
The Necromancers no longer need Valkyrie to be their Death Bringer, and that is a good thing. There's just one catch. The reason the Necromancers do not need her anymore. Because they've found their Death Bringer already, the person who will dissolve the doors between life and death. And that is a very, very bad thing... Skulduggery and Valkyrie have seven days to uncover the Necromancers' secret before it is too late. The clock is ticking. Lord Vile is loose. And after this one, nothing will ever be the same again.

=== Kingdom of the Wicked (2012) ===
Magic is a disease. Across the land, normal people are suddenly developing wild and unstable powers. Infected by a rare strain of magic, they are unwittingly endangering their own lives and the lives of the people around them. Terrified and confused, their only hope lies with the Sanctuary. Skulduggery Pleasant and Valkyrie Cain are needed now more than ever. And then there's the small matter of Kitana. A normal teenage girl who, along with her normal teenage friends, becomes infected. Becomes powerful. Becomes corrupted. Wielding the magic of gods, they're set to tear the city apart unless someone stands up against them. Looks like it is going to be another one of those days...

=== Last Stand of Dead Men (2013) ===
War has finally come. But it is not a war between good and evil, or light and dark – it is a war between Sanctuaries. For too long, the Irish Sanctuary has teetered on the brink of world-ending disaster, and the other Sanctuaries around the world have had enough. Allies turn to enemies, friends turn to foes, and Skulduggery and Valkyrie must team up with the rest of the Dead Men if they're going to have any chance at all of maintaining the balance of power and getting to the root of a vast conspiracy that has been years in the making. But while this war is only beginning, another war rages within Valkyrie herself. Her own dark side, the insanely powerful being known as Darquesse, is on the verge of rising to the surface. And if Valkyrie slips, even for a moment, then Darquesse will rise and the world will burn.

=== The Dying of the Light (2014) ===
The final book of the first series. The War of the Sanctuaries has been won, but not without its casualties. Following the loss of Valkyrie Cain, Skulduggery Pleasant must use any and all means to track down and stop Darquesse before she turns the world into a charred, lifeless cinder, drawing together a team of soldiers, monster hunters, killers, criminals... and Valkyrie's own murderous reflection. The war may be over, but the final battle is about to begin. And not everyone will get out of here alive...

== Phase II novels ==
In October 2019, following an interview alongside Eoin Colfer, Landy confirmed the original and preferred title of Resurrection and the sequel series as a whole to be Valkyrie Cain, after both series' main protagonist, a title previously considered for both Playing with Fire and the first series as a whole. He attributed the names' continued official disuse to an unnamed HarperCollins executive.

=== Resurrection (2017) ===
A lot has changed. Roarhaven is now a magical city, where sorcerers can live openly. Valkyrie Cain has been out of action for years, recovering from the war against her alter-ego Darquesse, which nearly destroyed her and everyone else. Some things never change though: bad people still want to do bad things, and Skulduggery Pleasant is still there to stop them. When Skulduggery learns of a plot to resurrect a terrifying evil, he persuades Valkyrie to join him for just 24 hours. But they need someone else on their team, someone inconspicuous, someone who can go undercover. Enter Omen Darkly. Student at the new Corrival Academy. Overlooked. Unremarkable in every way. 24 hours to save the world. One sharply dressed skeleton. One grief-stricken young woman. One teenage boy who cannot remember which class he is supposed to be in. This cannot end well...

=== Midnight (2018) ===
For years, Valkyrie Cain has struggled to keep her loved ones safe from harm, plunging into battle — time and time again — by Skulduggery Pleasant's side, and always emerging triumphant. But now the very thing that Valkyrie fights for is in danger, as a ruthless killer snatches her little sister in order to lure Valkyrie into a final confrontation. With Skulduggery racing to catch up and young sorcerer Omen scrambling along behind, Valkyrie only has twelve hours to find Alice before it is too late. The clock is ticking...

=== Bedlam (2019) ===
On a desperate journey to recover her sister's lost soul, Valkyrie Cain goes up against the High Sanctuary itself, and there is nothing Skulduggery Pleasant can do to stop her. With Abyssinia's grand plan about to kick off in a night of magic, terror, and bloodshed, it falls to Omen Darkly to save the lives of thousands of innocent people. And as the madness unfolds around him, as hidden enemies' step into the light, and as Valkyrie is sucked into a desperate, lawless quest of her own, he has no choice but to become the hero he never really wanted to be — or die in the attempt.

=== Seasons of War (2020) ===
War is coming. To avert catastrophe, Skulduggery and Valkyrie are sent on a secret mission that takes them away from everything they know, to a forsaken land of magic, and grim unrelenting terror. With the last of the Dead Men (Dexter Vex and Saracen Rue), Tanith Low, and Dimensional Shunter "Luke Skywalker". It is here that Valkyrie will have to fight the hardest – not only against the enemies who want her dead but also against her own self-destructive impulses. And it is only by crawling through the darkness that she will be able to once again stand in the light...

=== Dead or Alive (2021) ===
In a matter of days, the world will change. Billions of lives will be wiped away in a final, desperate search for Alice, the Child of the Faceless Ones – she who is destined to bring about the return of humankind's ancient overlords. To prevent this, Skulduggery Pleasant and Valkyrie Cain have one last – terrible – option: the assassination of Damocles Creed. With protests stirring in the magical city of Roarhaven, with riots and revolutions on the horizon, Valkyrie must decide who she wants to be: the hero who risks everything for a noble ideal, or the killer who sacrifices her own soul for the fate of humanity. The decision must be made, and time is running out.

=== Until the End (2022) ===
The second cycle of the internationally bestselling Skulduggery Pleasant series is brought to an end. The Faceless Ones have returned to our universe. The bad guys have won. With the end of everything just days away – and no longer able to rely on Valkyrie Cain – Skulduggery must make allies of enemies if he's going to stand any chance of saving what is left of the world. And just when things are looking their bleakest, they manage to get even worse, with Omen Darkly suddenly having to step up when his brother, the Chosen One, falls.

== Phase III novels ==
=== A Mind Full of Murder (2024) ===
In September 2023 Derek Landy announced the third series of Skulduggery Pleasant. The first book of the third series is called Skulduggery Pleasant: A Mind Full of Murder and was published on 28 March 2024. It was released with this description:

SIX YEARS AGO, THE UNIVERSE ENDED.

When it restarted, blinking back into existence, it brought with it a darkness that remains hidden from the mortal population.

A week ago – fueled by unimaginable hatred and unstoppable rage – a masked sorcerer killed one of those mortals. Then he killed another. And another.

With their time running out, Skulduggery Pleasant and Valkyrie Cain must work to solve the puzzles the killer leaves behind before more innocents die, embarking on a journey that will force them to deal with the apocalypse they failed to prevent the first time around.

AND MURDER. LOTS AND LOTS OF MURDER.

=== A Heart Full of Hatred (2025) ===
A Heart Full of Hatred was published in March 2025. It was released with this description:

A killer is stalking and murdering sorcerers, and Valkyrie Cain is next on his list.

While hunting down a cult of magical terrorists intent on taking their revenge on the mortal world, Skulduggery and Valkyrie are drawn into a murder investigation with unsettling similarities to a case they just closed – the case that nearly took the lives of both Valkyrie's sister and girlfriend.

With the body count rising, a special night approaches – a night where the elite of sorcerer society will gather on a remote island to witness a ceremony that could change that society forever.

Speeches will be made, champagne will be sipped, and two things will become terribly, distressingly clear…

No one is safe. And not everyone will make it out alive.

=== A Soul Full of Shadows (2026) ===
A Soul Full of Shadows was published on March 26th, 2026. It was released with this description:

Skulldugery Pleasant has had many many enemies - and people try to kill him multiple times a day.

But when someone puts a price on his head, he finds himself going up against a foe not even he can beat. Not alone, anyway.

And where is his partner right when he needs her the most?

Valkyrie Cain is in prison, fighting to stay alive in a place where everyone wants to kill her.

With an island of sorcerers ready to cite themselves of from the rest of the world, a terrorist group enjoying unprecedented public support, and a showdown looming between Winter Grieving and the Child of the Ancients, Skulduggery Pleasant and Valkyrie find that their options, like their chances, are quickly running out.

Is this the end?

== Stand-alone novels ==
=== The End of the World (2012) ===
(6–7) In June 2011 Landy posted on his blog that he would be writing a short story about Skulduggery called The End of the World. It was released in late February 2012 to coincide with World Book Day 2012. The Australian release of this novella came with an additional short story titled Just Another Friday Night. Deleted scenes from Skulduggery Pleasant were included. It is set a few months after Death Bringer. It was included in the 2014's short story collection.

=== The Maleficent Seven (2013) ===
(7–8) A spin-off novel featuring Tanith Low taking place between the seventh and eighth books was released on 28 March 2013 in the U.K & Ireland and 1 April in other countries. The cover and title (Tanith Low in... The Maleficent Seven: From the World of Skulduggery Pleasant) were released on 7 December 2012 after several delays, with Landy stating it to be his favourite book cover ever.

This time, the bad guys take the stage. Tanith Low, now possessed by a remnant, recruits a gang of villains – many of whom will be familiar from previous Skulduggery adventures – in order to track down and steal the four God-Killer level weapons that could hurt Darquesse when she eventually emerges. Also on the trail of the weapons is a secret group of Sanctuary sorcerers, and doing his best to keep up and keep Tanith alive is one Mister Ghastly Bespoke. When the villains around her are lying and scheming and plotting, Tanith needs to stay two steps ahead of her teammates and her enemies. After all, she's got her own double-crosses to plan – and she's a villain herself... It is a good day to be a bad guy.

=== Armageddon Outta Here (2014) ===
Armageddon Outta Here is a collection of all the previous short stories and novellas published in the series along with 3 new short stories, 1 new novella and a sample chapter from the final book. It was released on 3 July 2014. The order below represents chronological order, as they as listed in the collection, as opposed to their original publication date.

- Across a Dark Plain: 1861: (–1) The Dead Men traversed South Dakota on the hunt for their target, Nefarian Serpine.
- The Horror Writers' Halloween Ball: 1986: (–1) Gordon Edgley and Skulduggery Pleasant attend the party of the enigmatic Sebastian Fawkes.
- The Lost Art of World Domination: (1–2) Set after Skulduggery Pleasant, Scaramouch Van Dreg manages to capture Skulduggery Pleasant. Originally included in Skulduggery Pleasant.
- Gold, Babies and the Brothers Muldoon: (2–3) Set after Playing with Fire, The Muldoons kidnap babies and hold them to ransom. Originally included in Playing with Fire.
- The Slightly Ignominious End to the Legend of Black Annis:(3–4) Set after The Faceless Ones, Tanith Low encounters Black Annis for the first time. Originally included in The Faceless Ones.
- Friday Night Fights: (3–4) Sometime before Dark Days, The story of how Valkyrie Cain and Caelan met each other.
- Myosotis Terra: (4–5) Set after Dark Days, Skulduggery and Valkyrie search for Myosotis Terra. As part of a competition, a short story was written in 2011 with the winning entry featuring as a character. Some European editions of Mortal Coil contained this story. It was re-released in the tour edition of the 2012 Australian tour edition.
- The Wonderful Adventures of Geoffrey Scrutinous: (5–6) Set after Mortal Coil, Geoffrey Scrutinous and Skulduggery Pleasant search for Elwood Satchel. Originally included in Mortal Coil.
- Just Another Friday Night: (5–6) Sometime before Death Bringer, Tane Aiavao and Hayley Skirmish meet with a cursed family.
- The End of the World: (6–7) Set after Death Bringer, Skulduggery and Valkyrie attempt to solve a mystery surrounding Deacon Maybury, Ryan and the Doomsday Machine.
- Trick or Treat: (7–7.5) Sometime before The Maleficent Seven, Tanith and Billy-Ray Sanguine continue their quest to destroy the God-Killers. In October 2011, Derek Landy posted a Halloween special on his blog, a short story featuring Tanith Low and Billy-Ray Sanguine, titled Trick or Treat. It is a prelude to The Maleficent Seven as it deals with the God-Killer weapons.
- Get Thee Behind Me, Bubba Moon: (7–7.5) Set after Kingdom of the Wicked, A haunted house is investigated.
- The Button: (7.5–8) Set after Theatre of Shadows: Skulduggery and Valkyrie attempt to avert the cause of the world's destruction. Derek Landy announced on 14 December 2012 that from 21 to 22 December, a short story relating to the Mayan 2012 apocalypse theory would be available on his blog, titled The Button. It was eventually included in the short story collection.

The paperback (29 January 2015) contains three more short stories:

- Death and Texas: (3–4) Set between Friday Night Fights and Dark Days.
- Theatre of Shadows: (7–7.5) Set between Get Thee Behind Me, Bubba Moon and The Maleficent Seven.
- Eyes of the Beholder: (7.5–8) Set between The Maleficent Seven and The Button.

The 2022 version contains even more short stories, while also removing Death and Texas:

- Going Once, Going Twice: (4–5) Set between Dark Days and Mortal Coil, an additional short story was later published to the Skulduggery Pleasant website in 2018: Going Once, Going Twice.
- Outside the Murder Cottage, By the Sea: A Valkyrie Cain Adventure: (13-14)
- Haunted: (13-14)
- Those Who Watch (formerly Skulduggery Bites): (13-14) On 20 March 2020, Landy started posting a "choose your own adventure"-type story to Twitter. It ended on 1 April 2020. It had readers vote in a poll at the end of each day he posted the tweets to decide something in the story. The story follows Valkyrie and Skulduggery going to America to investigate a witch. It introduces the concept of "Horts", essentially people outside of the fictional universe who consume entertainment (that is actually real in the fictional world) and have choices as to what happens.

=== Apocalypse Kings (2021) ===
(5–6) Set between Mortal Coil and Death Bringer, the novella Apocalypse Kings was published in February 2021.

=== The Skulduggery Pleasant Grimoire (2021) ===
A reference guidebook, The Skulduggery Pleasant Grimoire, was published on 27 May 2021.

=== Hell Breaks Loose (2023) ===
In October 2022, Landy announced via YouTube livestream that a "one-off prequel" and "Book 0·1", officially titled Skulduggery Pleasant: Hell Breaks Loose (titled on-page as Hell Breaks Loose: From the World of Skulduggery Pleasant, the same titling scheme as the 2013 novella Tanith Low in... The Maleficent Seven), was already written and edited, and would release 27 June 2023

Three-hundred years before the story begins... the story begins. Set in Tuscany, Italy, 1703, during the War, Hell Breaks Loose focuses on an enraged Skulduggery, 13 years after being killed with his wife and child by Serpine and resurrected as a living skeleton, and three years after his five years as Lord Vile, as he and the Dead Men hunt down Serpine and Vengeous, the Generals of Mevolent.

=== Bad Magic (2023) ===
(15–16) Bad Magic: A Graphic Novel was published in November, 2023. It featured a brand-new villain, Mr.Friendly. Skulduggery Pleasant and Valkyrie Cain must stop him from killing the whole town.

=== The Haunted House on Hollow Hill (2024) ===
(16–17) Six podcast episodes were released weekly from August to September 2024. After the conclusion of the podcast, a paperback novelized version was released, featuring the story of the podcast with additional content added.

=== A Small Matter of Impending Catastrophe (2025) ===
(16–17) A Small Matter of Impending Catastrophe was published October 28, 2025.

== Reception ==
=== Reviews ===
As the first four novels released, immense popularity and positive reviews have been given to the novels. Many critics praised Derek Landy's way of writing due to his large gallery of characters.

Phillip Ardagh (The Guardian):

It's exciting, pacy, nicely handled and it's fun. There's nothing worthy about it, and it's all the better for that. And, I might add, it's self-contained. Landy may well revisit these characters – I sincerely hope he does – but it's a pleasingly rounded tale, which is refreshing in these days of endless open-ended books of never-ending series.

Nathan Nicholls (Whitby Gazette):

There is no expense spared by Landy in this book and I would have to say that everyone who could be bothered to read it, would definitely be drawn into it and certainly enjoy it. (...) Something for everyone and everything for someone, Skulduggery Pleasant is easily my book of the year so far. Read it!

Christina Hardyment (The Independent):

Landy is an established horror writer, and the combats between Skulduggery, Serpine and his legions of Hollow Men and vampires rival the climaxes of the Potter films for hair-raising effects; it isn't often that writing makes you feel as if you are watching a film.

The Times:

Derek Landy's debut, Skulduggery Pleasant (...) has a distinctly Horowitzian humour and verve to it, being a detective story featuring a wizard's skeleton as hero. When Stephanie's uncle dies, she discovers his horror stories weren't fiction, and that evil forces are after her for a mysterious key. Wisecracking madly, the duo must survive each other as well as Hell. At the end of it, readers of 12+ may well be regretting their consumption of chocolate eggs.

The series did not prove popular in the US at first, with the publisher initially ceasing releases in the US after the third book. However, during the initial release of Phase II, all of the books which had previously not been released in the US did receive a US release, and new books have continued to receive US releases going forward.

=== Accolades ===
Skulduggery Pleasant won the Red House Children's Book Award, the Bolton Children's Book Award and the Staffordshire Young Teen Fiction Award. The book was also recommended for confident readers (9+) by the Richard & Judy Children's Book Club in 2007. It also won the Portsmouth Book Awards in 2008, having been selected by school children in Portsmouth, as well as winning Irish book of the decade in 2010. Also, in 2009, it won the Kernow Youth and Grampian Book Awards by a majority vote. It had also been nominated for Young Reader's Choice Awards 2010 in North America and it won Irish Book Awards in 2009 and 2010.

=== Film adaptation ===
A film adaption was in development under Warner Brothers but according to Derek Landy, the script was "the worst thing [he had] ever read", with Skulduggery Pleasant a "skeleton body who somehow retained his head and face", a magnifying glass magic wand, and a musical number where he danced to Michael Jackson's "Man in the Mirror". In December 2010, Landy announced on his blog that the movie rights were back with him. In October 2019, Landy confirmed he had written a new screenplay draft, adapting the first novel and elements of a short story. In interviews with the Irish Examiner and The Nerd Daily in March and April 2021, Landy confirmed he was continuing the development of a screenplay.
