= Rupert Degas =

British actor (born 1970)

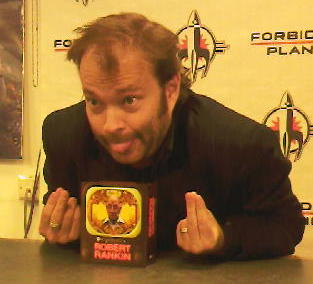
- Degas in 2008
- Born: Rupert Joel Degas; August 17, 1970 (age 56); London, England
- Citizenship: United Kingdom; Australia
- Occupations: Actor; impressionist
- Years active: 1985–present
- Father: Brian Degas
- Website: rupertdegas.com

Rupert Joel Degas (born August 17, 1970) is a British and Australian actor. He is best known for his voice work in animation, audiobooks, and advertising.

== Early life and education ==
Degas was educated at Hill House School in Knightsbridge and Emanuel School in Wandsworth.

== Career ==
=== Animation ===
Best known as the voices of Zoomer and Scrambler in Bob the Builder from 2004 to 2011, his other animation work includes Chop Socky Chooks, Robotboy, Thomas & Friends Lucky Fred, Groove High, and The Amazing World of Gumball. He also played several characters in the animated feature film Planet 51. He also worked on films such as Asterix Conquers America and A Fox's Tale, as well as animated short films such as Cherry on the Cake, Fish with Legs and Badgered.

Since moving to Australia in 2012, Degas has provided voices for The Wild Adventures of Blinky Bill, Kitty Is Not a Cat, The Strange Chores, Maya the Bee: The Honey Games, Bluey, Alien TV, Kangaroo Beach, 100% Wolf, Peter Rabbit 2: The Runaway, and My Freaky Family. He also narrated three episodes of The Wheel of Time.

=== Audiobook narration ===
Degas has narrated over 300 audiobooks. He has received particular critical acclaim for his performances of The Name of the Wind by Patrick Rothfuss, and Skulduggery Pleasant by Derek Landy. Degas says of audiobooks, "I do accents. It's my specialty." The Guardian called his voice performances "shape-shifting". In 2022, Degas was inducted as a Golden Voice by AudioFile magazine.

=== Film and television ===
Degas' first film appearance was in Jerry Schatzberg's Reunion, followed by television appearances in Dead Romantic, Over Here, A Touch of Frost and Passport to Murder. Other notable television appearances include EastEnders, Lovejoy, Van der Valk, Waiting For God, Lycée Alpin, Holby City, Love Soup, Shoot the Messenger, Nathan Barley, and Red Dwarf. Degas also provided the voice of the demon in both Exorcist: The Beginning and the 2013 film Evil Dead.

=== Theatre ===
Having been a regular Newsrevue performer at the Canal Café Theatre and at the Edinburgh Fringe, Degas made his West End theatre debut in Stones in His Pockets at The Duke of York's Theatre and the New Ambassadors Theatre, and then in the original Olivier Award winning London cast of The 39 Steps at The Tricycle Theatre before transferring to The Criterion Theatre in Piccadilly Circus. He has also performed in several plays at The Battersea Arts Centre, Latchmere Theatre and The Southwark Playhouse.

=== Radio and podcasts ===
On radio, Degas has performed in over eighty plays and series, most notably Grovers Mill, and the BBC productions of The Brightonomicon, Dirk Gently, The Hitchhiker's Guide to the Galaxy, and Starship Titanic. He also played Pantalaimon in the full cast audio production of His Dark Materials.

== Awards and honours ==
- AudioFile Earphones Award - 23 honours as of July 2024.
- 2008 Odyssey Award for Skulduggery Pleasant
- 2021 Australian Book Industry Awards (ABIAs) - Mammoth by Chris Flynn
- 2022 AudioFile Golden Voice

== Filmography ==
- 1989: Reunion as Muller
- 1993: Passport to Murder as Georges
- 1994: Asterix Conquers America as Medicine Man, Indian Chief, Legionnaires, Gauls, Pirate #1, Galley Slave #1, Senator #2, Indians, Geriatrix and Roman in Rome #2 (uncredited) (voice)
- 1995: The Short Walk as French Prisoner
- 1996: Over Here as Denny
- 2004: Exorcist: The Beginning as Pazuzu (voice)
- 2006: Dark Corners as Needletooth (voice)
- 2006: Shoot the Messenger as Mark
- 2009: Starsuckers as Narrator
- 2009: Planet 51 as Chief Gorlock (voice)
- 2009: Pope Joan as Anastasius (voice)
- 2013: Evil Dead as The Demon (voice)
- 2021: Peter Rabbit 2: The Runaway as Samuel Whiskers, Little Pig Robinson, Trainer Von Stauffenmouse and Kennedy St. Squirrel

== Voice in animated series ==
- 2002–2004: Mr. Bean: The Animated Series as Additional Voices
- 2002–2011: Bob the Builder as Pirate Brickbeard, Scrambler, Zoomer, Gripper, Flex, Sandy Beach and Dickie Chester, Dickie Olivier, Mr Ellis, Skip (Where's Robert?), Tom (US Dub)
- 2005–2008: Robotboy as Gus Turner, Constantine, Klaus von Affenkugel and Kurt
- 2006–2008: Skatoony as Chudd Chudders and Tony Eagle-Eyes
- 2006: Chop Socky Chooks as Bubba and Itchi
- 2011–2012: The Amazing World of Gumball as Tobias Wilson (Season 1), Mr. Gaylord Robinson (Season 1), Clayton (Season 1), Felix (Season 1), Paperball (Season 1), Alan Keane (Season 1), Idaho (Season 1), Colin (Season 1), Gary Hedges (Season 1), Sal Left Thumb (Season 1), Clipboard Men (Season 1), Lenny Smith (Season 1), Charlie (Season 1), Albert (The Responsible) and Laurence "Larry" Needlemeyer (The Spoon)
- 2011–2012: Thomas & Friends as Dart (Seasons 15–16), Bertie (Seasons 15–16), Butch (Season 15; UK dub Season 16; US Dub) and Flynn (Seasons 15–16)
- 2011–2014: Lucky Fred as Fred, Supercommander and Wally K
- 2011: Groove High as Duke and Dr. Khan
- 2015: The Wild Adventures of Blinky Bill as Pablo, Bandi and Eddie
- 2017–2022: The Strange Chores as Barbarian and Frankie
- 2017–2020: Kitty Is Not a Cat as Happy, Ming, Mr. Clean, Pierre, Harold Stinkleton, Judger, Yeahno, Dr. Rick, Jungle Show Presenter and Additional Voices
- 2019: Alien TV as The Translator
- 2019–2023: 100% Wolf as Gunnolf, The Doog, Maurice, Claude, Lord Hightail, Hans Beowulf and Kenjo
- 2019–2022: Bluey as Yes/No Button, Movie Trailer Voice and Chunky Chimp
- 2020–2023: Kangaroo Beach as Big Trev, Gherkinn and Roadie
- 2022–2024: Ginger and the Vegesaurs as Wasabi and other vegesaurs

== Voice in animated films ==
- 1994: Asterix Conquers America as Medicine Man (Original version and French Dub), Indian Chief, Legionnaires, Gauls, Pirate #1, Galley Slave #1, Senator #2, Indians, Geriatrix and Roman in Rome #2 (uncredited) (Original version)
- 2004: Badgered as The Badger and The Crows
- 2008: A Fox's Tale as Rufus, Ché and Dizzy (English Dub)
- 2009: Planet 51 as Chief Gorlock
- 2011: Thomas & Friends: Day of the Diesels as Dart and Flynn (U.K./U.S. Dub)
- 2018: Maya the Bee: The Honey Games as Beegood
- 2018: Buñuel in the Labyrinth of the Turtles as Luis Buñuel (English Dub)
- 2020: 100% Wolf as Hotspur Lupin, Bruno (singular line) and Additional Voices
- 2021: Peter Rabbit 2: The Runaway as Samuel Whiskers, Little Pig Robinson, Trainer Von Stauffenmouse and Kennedy St. Squirrel
- 2024: My Freaky Family as Volos, Wormtrain, Knucklehead, and many more

== Voice in anime films ==
- 1994: Urotsukidoji (English Dub)
- 1994: Black Magic (manga) (English Dub)
- 1994: Kekko Kamen (English Dub)
- 1994: Adventure Duo (English Dub)
- 1994: Gigolo (English Dub)
- 1995: The Return of Arslan (English Dub)
- 1996: X (English Dub as Shōgo Asagi)
- 1996: Dub Seyiu (English Dub)
