= Technology Tax Relief =

Technology Tax Relief is the generic name for the programme of tax incentives implemented in the UK to incentivise companies to invest in high-value-add R&D and IP commercialisation.

== History ==
The new approach began in 2000 with the launch of the R&D Tax Credit for small and medium enterprises.

== Overview ==
Technology Tax Relief now encompasses the following main tax reliefs:

- Research & Development Tax Credit
- Patent Box
- Research and Development Capital Allowances
- Research and Development Expenditure Credit
- Creative Sector Tax Reliefs including
  - Video Games Tax Relief,
  - Animation Tax Relief,
  - High-End TV Production Tax Relief,
  - and Film Tax Relief
- The Enterprise Investment Scheme (EIS) and Seed Enterprise Investment Scheme (SEIS) give generous income and capital gains tax relief to individuals who invest in small early stage businesses.

== See also ==
- Research & Development Tax Credit
- Patent Box
- Research and Development Capital Allowances
- Research and Development Expenditure Credit
- Creative Sector Tax Reliefs
