= Bredon Hill =

Natural feature in Worcestershire, England

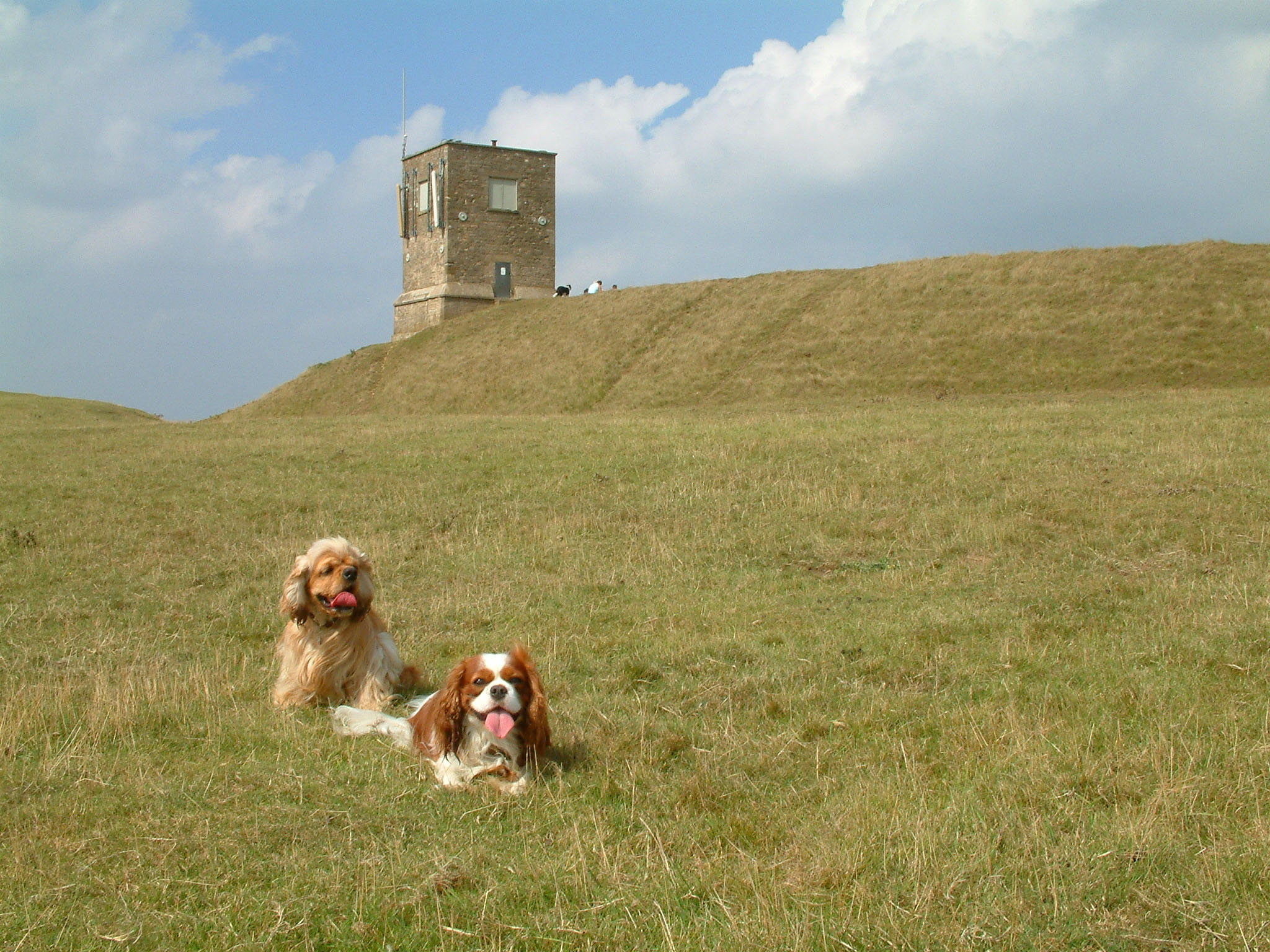
- The top of Bredon Hill, with Parsons Folly and the inner rampart of Kemerton Camp

Highest point
- Elevation: 299 m (981 ft)
- Prominence: 257 m (843 ft)
- Parent peak: The Wrekin
- Listing: Marilyn
- Coordinates: 52°03′37″N 2°03′46″W

Geography
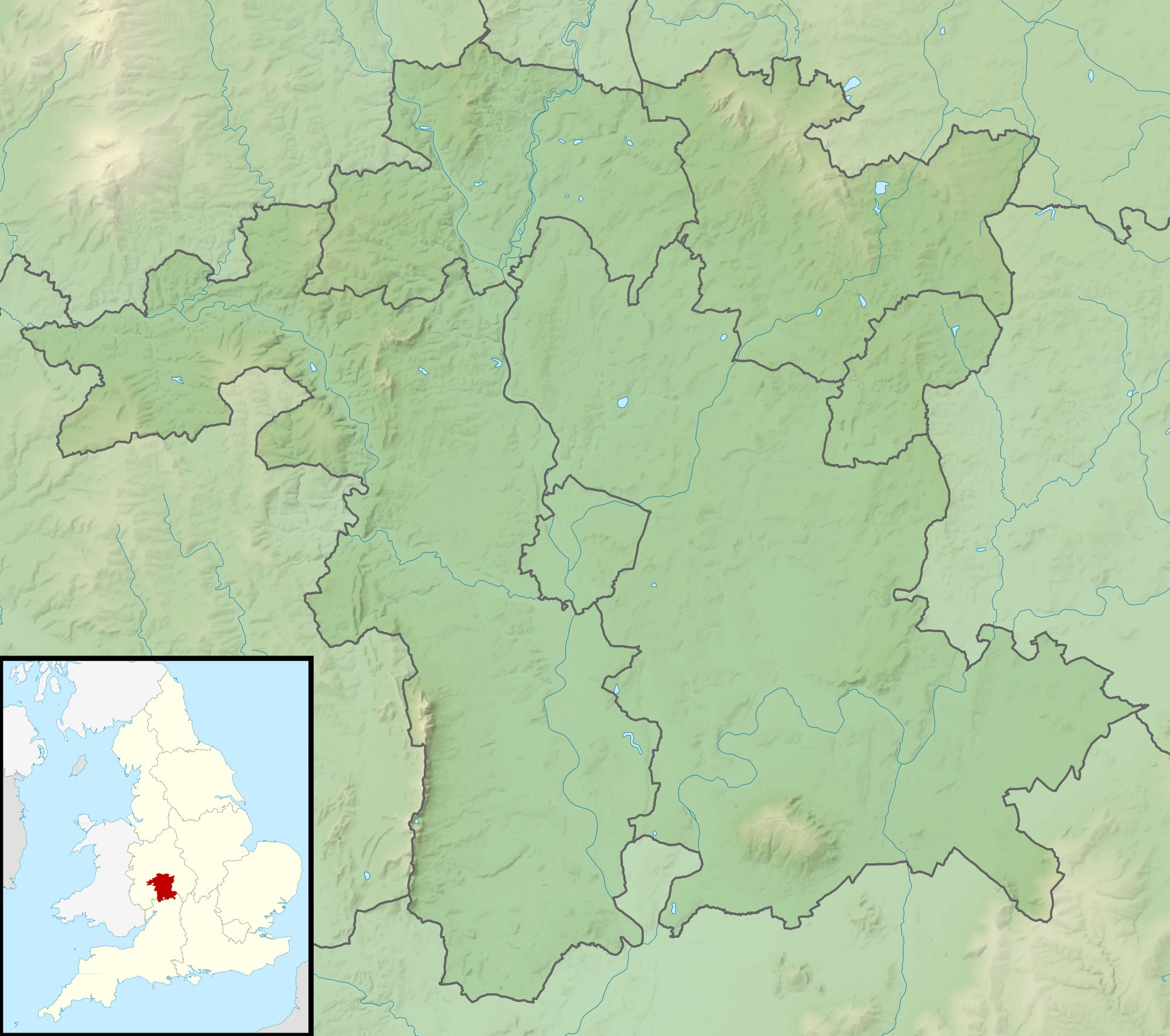
- Location within Worcestershire
- Location: Worcestershire, England
- OS grid: SO958402
- Topo map: OS Landranger 150

Bredon Hill is a hill located in Worcestershire, England, south-west of Evesham in the Vale of Evesham. The summit of the hill is in the parish of Kemerton, and it extends over parts of eight other parishes (listed below). The hill is geologically part of the Cotswolds and lies within the Cotswolds Area of Outstanding Natural Beauty. However, it now stands isolated in the Vale of Evesham due to natural causes.

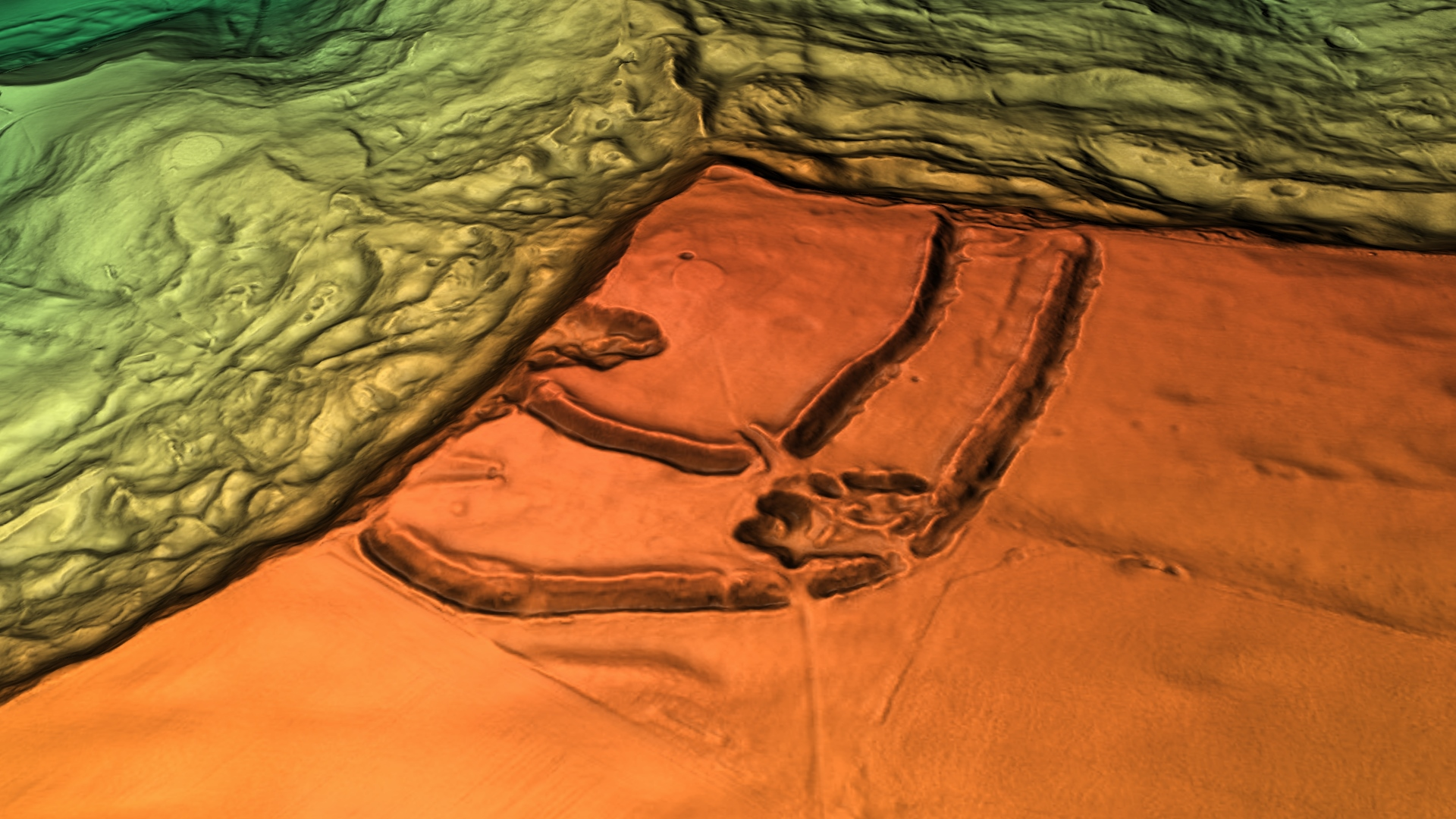
3D view of the digital terrain model

At the summit (previously located within Gloucestershire), adjacent to Kemerton Camp, is a small stone tower called Parsons Folly which stands at GPS coordinates (52.059963, -2.064606). The tower was built in the mid-18th century for John Parsons, MP (1732–1805), squire of Kemerton Court and intended as a summer house, from which a more extensive view of the surrounding countryside could be seen. The 981-foot (299 m) natural height of the hill contributes to the final height of the tower, whose top now reaches 1,000 feet (305 m). The folly (tower) became a well-known county landmark, and was believed to have inspired the building of Broadway Tower. The current owners, Overbury Estate, lease out the tower as a mobile phone base station, and a number of large aerials have been fitted to its exterior.

== Etymology ==
The name Bredon is first attested in charters from 775 and 780 which survive in eleventh-century copies, in the forms Breodun and Breadun. Here the name refers to the settlement now known as Bredon, but the settlement evidently took its name from the hill, which must once simply have been called Bredon: the first element of the name derives from Brittonic *breɣ ('hill'). This word, whose literal meaning was presumably not understood by Old English-speakers, was borrowed into Old English as a name for the hill, with the addition for clarification of the Old English word dūn (also meaning 'hill'). When the word dūn ceased to be understood to mean 'hill', and perhaps also to distinguish the hill from the settlement that took its name, the element Hill was added to the name of Bredon Hill; this name is first attested in 1828. Thus the name is, in terms of its etymological meanings, triply tautologous.

== History ==
At the summit of the hill, there are the remains of earthworks from an Iron Age hill fort known as Kemerton Camp, which is believed to have been abandoned in the 1st century A.D. after a considerable battle.

There are also Roman earthworks and a number of ancient standing stones on the hill. One large stone at the summit is called the Banbury Stone, deriving from 'Baenintesburg', a name for the fort in the 8th century. It is known colloquially as the 'Elephant Stone' because of its resemblance to that animal. Another pair of stones below the summit are known as the King and Queen Stones. Local legend tells that if you pass between them you will be cured of illness.

At Elmley Castle, on the north side of the hill, there are the remains of a considerable medieval castle, once the chief stronghold of the powerful Beauchamp family, who became Earls of Warwick. The castle fell into disrepair during the 16th century, and stone from it was used in the construction of the bridge at Pershore.

During the English Civil War Bredon Hill was the site of a gathering of Clubmen on 11 November 1645, after which they declared their support for Parliament.

A fair and summer games were held every Whitsun at the summit of Bredon Hill until c. 1876.

On 17 October 2011 Worcestershire County Council announced that Worcestershire's largest-ever hoard of Roman artefacts, including around 4,000 coins, featuring 16 different emperors, had been uncovered.

== Geology ==
Like the main Cotswold range of which it is a geological outlier, the hill is formed from a succession of Jurassic age mudstones, limestones and siltstones. The surrounding low ground is formed in the Charmouth Mudstones which forms a part of the Lias Group. These are overlain successively by the Dyrham Formation's siltstones and mudstones, the Marlstone Rock's limestone and sandstone, the Whitby Mudstone Formation, youngest of the Lias rock units, and finally the ooidal limestones of the Birdlip Limestone Formation. The last-named is the lowermost layer of the Inferior Oolite. The relatively flat spurs of Even Hill / Windmill Hill, Castle Hill, Little Hill and Holcombe Nap in the north and east are formed by a capping of the Marlstone Rock. A geological fault crosses the southern margin of the hill. The slopes of the hill beneath the Inferior Oolite rocks of the summit surface are substantially affected by landslips on all sides.

The 'Elephant Stone' is the largest of several large pieces of rock which lie in a hollow on the western margin of the summit plateau. It has been suggested that the hollow itself derives from the collapse of a cavern around 1800, the formerly larger stone would have then tumbled into its present position and broken up. Each of these stones is itself formed from smaller fragments of oolitic limestone, naturally cemented together by calcite and likely having gathered in an earlier cleft or 'gull' in the hillside. The King and Queen stones are of similar origin. The cambering which leads to the formation of gulls can be seen elsewhere on the unstable slopes of the hill.

== Nature and geography ==
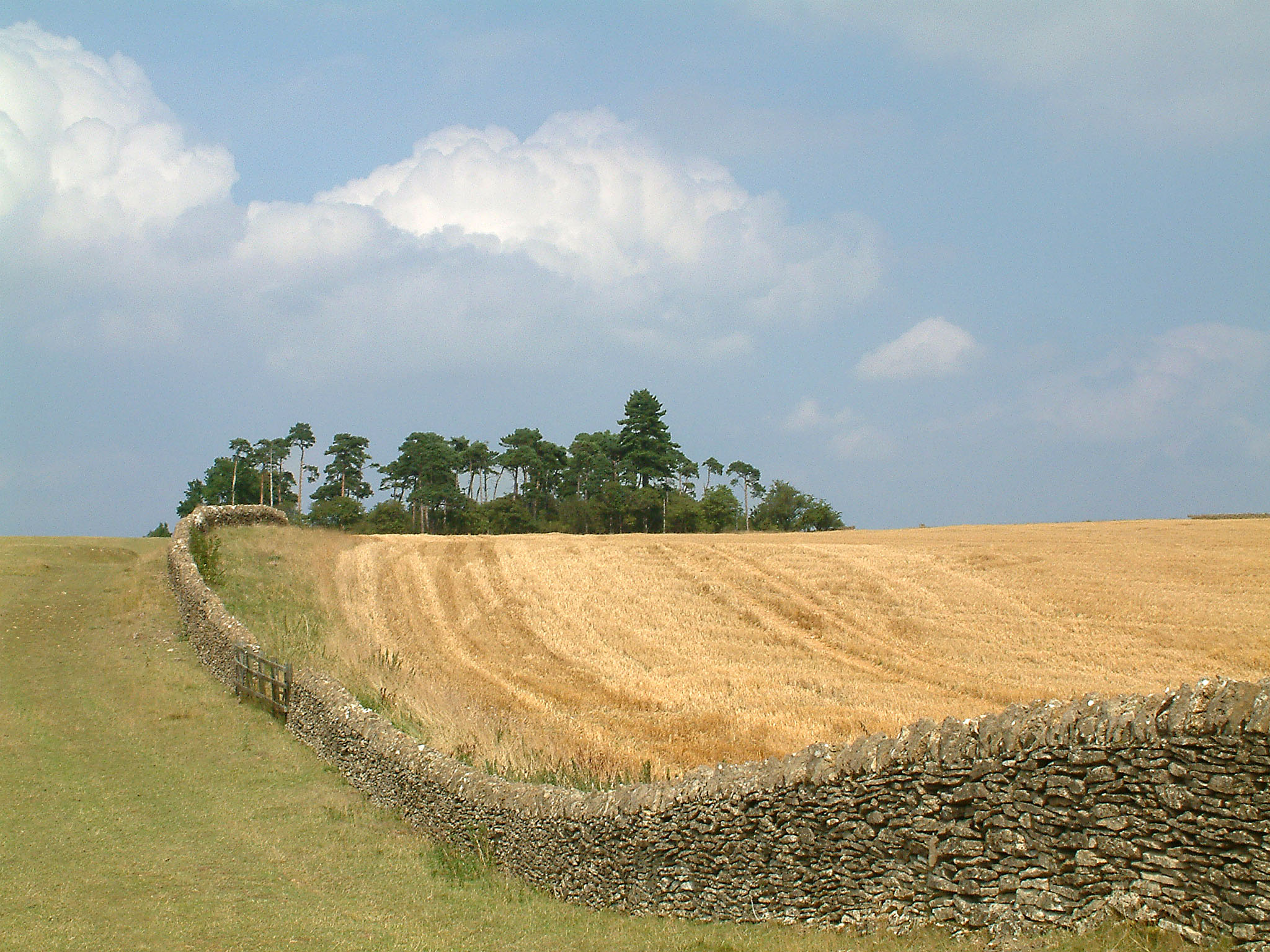
Oolitic limestone stone wall on Bredon Hill, separating grassland summit area from a wheat field

Bredon Hill is one of the most important wildlife sites in England, providing a range of habitats including ancient woodland, calcareous grassland and scrub. A large section of the western and northern scarp was designated a Site of Special Scientific Interest (SSSI) in 1955. Since 2005, an overlapping area has also been designated as a Special Area of Conservation (SAC) under the European Commission Habitats Directive. Part of the SAC is a National Nature Reserve. Bredon Hill is most important as habitat for rare invertebrates, such as the violet click beetle. Natural England and Kemerton Conservation Trust are among those organisations participating in wildlife management on the hill.

Several parts of the hill are managed for wildlife under DEFRA 'Environmental Stewardship' schemes. This includes the area around the summit, which is managed as grassland with open public access.

A large number of public footpaths and bridleways cross the hill from the villages circling its base, and allow for a variety of circular routes to be devised. The Wychavon Way passes over the hill, but does not reach the summit itself, passing close by (necessitating a short easy detour).

== SOTA ==
Bredon Hill has a Summits On The Air (SOTA) reference of G/CE-003

Bredon Hill remains an important physical landmark within the Cotswold National Landscape, distinguishing the boundary between the West Midlands and The South West Government Economic regions of the UK. The north of the hill looks more towards the Midlands, whilst the south side of the hill remains more West Country facing (PAS 1995 Gloucestershire Uni paper; Geog)

== Literature and the arts ==
Bredon Hill features in the works of a multitude of composers, poets, writers and artists. This pantheon includes the composers Ralph Vaughan Williams, Sir Arthur Somervell, Ivor Gurney, George Butterworth, Herbert Howells and Julius Harrison; the poets A. E. Housman, John Masefield, Cecil Day-Lewis, John Drinkwater and U. A. Fanthorpe; the authors E. V. Lucas, Arthur Quiller-Couch, William Cobbett, E. Temple Thurston, Francis Brett Young, Hesketh Hesketh-Prichard, John Moore, Fred Archer and Jenny Glanfield; and the artists Peter de Wint, Alfred William Parsons, Benjamin Williams Leader, Frederick Whitehead, Josiah Wood Whymper, Alfred Egerton Cooper, A. R. Quinton, Henry Yeend King and Anna Hornby.

The hill is immortalised in poem 21 of A. E. Housman's 1896 anthology, A Shropshire Lad.

In summertime on Bredon
The bells they sound so clear;
Round both the shires they ring them
In steeples far and near,
A happy noise to hear.

Here of a Sunday morning
My love and I would lie,
And see the coloured counties,
And hear the larks so high
About us in the sky.

The bells would ring to call her
In valleys miles away;
"Come all to church, good people;
Good people come and pray."
But here my love would stay.

And I would turn and answer
Among the springing thyme,
"Oh, peal upon our wedding,
And we will hear the chime,
And come to church in time."

But when the snows at Christmas
On Bredon top were strown,
My love rose up so early
And stole out unbeknown
And went to church alone.

They tolled the one bell only,
Groom there was none to see,
The mourners followed after,
And so to church went she,
And would not wait for me.

The bells they sound on Bredon,
And still the steeples hum,
"Come all to church, good people."
O noisy bells, be dumb;
I hear you, I will come.

Bredon Hill is the birthplace of farmer and writer Fred Archer (1915–1999), whose many books describe, in vivid prose, life on the farms and in the villages, particularly during the first part of the 20th century.

The author John Moore described life on and around Bredon Hill in the early 20th century in the Brensham Trilogy.

Julius Harrison's 1941 composition for violin and orchestra, Bredon Hill, takes its name from the hill which he could see from his home.

The children's author Ursula Moray Williams lived on the hill in Beckford from 1945 until her death in 2006.

=== Contemporary arts and crafts ===
There is a lively local arts scene around the hill such as the Bredon Hill Open Studios group of artists, designers and craftspeople who open up their studios to the public. This group includes the artist Samantha Dadd, Conderton Pottery and Beckford Silk-printing workshop. Contemporary artists painting the local area include Nick Holdsworth and Tony Whitehouse.

== Incidental information ==
When Worcester Cathedral was damaged in the English Civil War, it was repaired with stone brought from Bredon.

A well-known local saying, which predicts bad weather, goes: "When Bredon Hill has on his hat, men of the vale beware of that".

== Villages ==
The hill is made up from land belonging to 9 parishes. Working clockwise from the summit these are:

- Kemerton
- Bredon & Bredon's Norton
- Eckington
- Great Comberton
- Little Comberton
- Elmley Castle, Bricklehampton & Netherton
- Ashton under Hill
- Beckford
- Overbury & Conderton
- Birlingham and Nafford

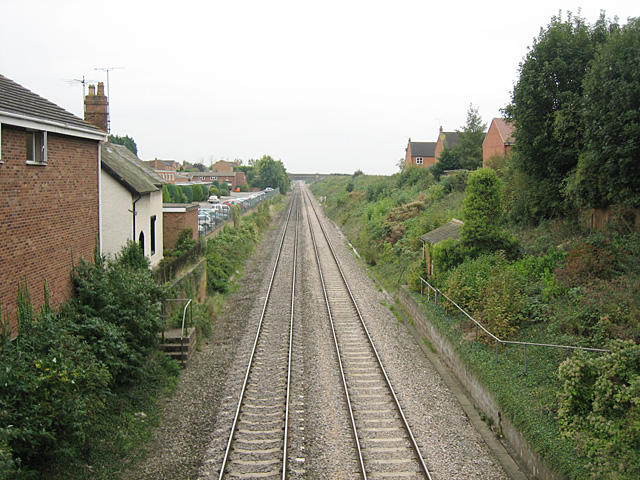
The currently closed Bredon railway station.
