= Creative Sector Tax Relief =

Creative Sector Tax Relief is a programme of tax incentives implemented in the United Kingdom in 2012 which encompass new incentives aimed at supporting the animation, high-end television and video game industries, in addition to the existing relief available for film production. The new reliefs are designed to promote culturally-relevant productions in the UK, to incentivise investment into UK productions that would otherwise take place outside the UK, and to support the necessary critical mass of infrastructure and skills in the UK for both today and in the longer term.

== History ==
The government announced in the March 2012 Budget that it would introduce corporation tax reliefs from April 2013 for the video game, animation and high-end television industries, subject to State aid approval and following consultation. These new reliefs were confirmed in Budget 2013 and the draft Finance Bill 2013. Up to this point, the creative industries had struggled to access existing Technology Tax Relief because the qualifying definitions of schemes such as R&D Tax Relief have fallen outside the creative sectors, even though companies in these sectors are often pioneers in new and advanced technologies. The reliefs will bring the UK's creative sector tax regime into line with other countries such as Canada and Japan which already have specific tax reliefs for the creative industries.

== Overview ==
Production companies in all three industries are able to claim an additional deduction worth 100 per cent of UK qualifying production expenditure (where qualifying expenditure is a maximum of 80 per cent of total production expenditure) and, if they are loss-making, they will be able to surrender such losses for a payable tax credit worth 25 per cent of UK qualifying production expenditure (ie. effectively a payable credit of a maximum 20 per cent of total production expenditure). These reliefs are modelled on the existing film tax relief scheme, which has supported over £5 billion of investment into British films and seen a 70 per cent increase in the film production workforce since its introduction in 2007

The draft Finance Bill 2013 legislation allowed for qualifying expenditure incurred after 1 April 2013 to be eligible for the reliefs subject to State aid approval by the European Commission. The Commission approved the animation tax relief and high-end television production tax relief to start on 1 April 2013 once the regulations come into force with the granting of royal assent of the Finance Act 2013 in August 2013. Video game tax relief was given state-aid approval by the EU Commission in March 2014, meaning that it came into effect from 1 April 2014.

The steady state cost, after the initial phasing-in period, of the reliefs is forecast to be approximately £120 million per annum (£55 million for video game tax relief and animation tax relief, plus £65 million for high-end television production tax relief) in terms of corporation tax revenues foregone by HM Treasury. The estimated annual administrative cost for HMRC of running all three new creative industry tax relief regimes will be approximately £500,000). They will also set up a specialist unit to facilitate claims for animation and video game relief (but not high-end tv production).

== Cultural test ==
Productions must be certified by the Department for Digital, Culture, Media and Sport (DCMS) as culturally British to be eligible for relief, as per the existing Film Tax Relief.

The cultural tests for each relief were published in the draft Finance Bill 2013 .

The cultural tests will be handled by the British Film Institute on behalf of DCMS as follows:

- Animation tax relief – BFI cultural test application form
- High-end tv production tax relief – BFI cultural test application form
- Video game tax relief – BFI cultural test application form

== Other technology tax reliefs ==
- Video Games Tax Relief – The Video Games Tax Relief (VGTR) was established in 2014 to help support creativity in the UK games industry. The key benefit of the tax relief is that qualifying companies can claim up to 20% of their "core expenditure" back, provided that expenditure has been made in the European Economic Area (EEA).
- Animation Tax Relief
- High-End TV Production Tax Relief
- Research & Development Tax Credit
- Research & Development Expenditure Credit
- Research & Development Capital Allowances
- Patent Box
- Film Tax Relief

The Enterprise Investment Scheme (EIS) and the Seed Enterprise Investment Scheme (SEIS) give generous income and capital gains tax-relief to individuals who invest in small early-stage businesses.

== Public consultation and working groups ==
The government ran a public consultation exercise in summer 2012 on the proposals for Creative Sector Tax Reliefs. Respondents included industry participants (The Walt Disney Company; Channel 4; Electronic Arts; Aardman Animations) the financial services community including large accounting firms (PWC; Deloitte) and independent consultants (MMP Tax); and trade bodies such as The Independent Games Developers Association (TIGA).

The government also established industry-focused working groups for the animation, high-end television and video game industries to complement wider consultation on the new tax reliefs and to discuss options and proposals in more detail.
