= Adrian Darby =

British conservationist and academic (born 1937)

Adrian Marten George Darby, OBE (born 25 September 1937) is a British conservationist and academic.

== Academic and conservation career ==
Darby served as a fellow and tutor in economics at Keble College, University of Oxford (1963–1985), and visiting lecturer in environmental economics at the University of Pennsylvania in 1978. He subsequently served as chairman of Europe's largest nature conservation organization the RSPB (1986–1993), and became vice-president from 1996 onwards. He founded the Kemerton Conservation Trust in 1989. Darby was chairman of Plantlife International 1994–2002, and president from 2005 onwards. He was chairman of Planta Europa 1998–2004. In 1995 he became a trustee of the Herpetological Conservation Trust. He served as chairman of the UK Committee of the World Conservation Union (1996–1999). From 1997 he sat on the board of the Farming and Rural Conservation Agency. He served as chairman of the Joint Nature Conservation Committee of the United Kingdom from 2004 to 2007. Darby was appointed OBE for services to nature conservation in 1996.

== Other voluntary interests ==
Darby has served as a regional committee member of the National Trust; a fellow (governor) of Eton College (1979–1994); a county committee member of the Country Landowners Association. Since 1998 he has been a Liberal Democrat councillor for Wychavon District Council in Worcestershire.

== Family ==
Darby is the son of Col. Cyril Darby MC of Kemerton Court and Monica Dunne, daughter of Marten Dunne, MP of Gatley Park. He is married to acupuncturist Lady Meriel Darby, daughter of the former Prime Minister Alec Douglas-Home. He has one son, Matthew, and one daughter, Catherine.

Non-profit organization positions
Preceded by David Bellamy	President of Plantlife; 2005–present	Incumbent
