= Research and Development Expenditure Credit =

The Research and Development Expenditure Credit (RDEC), introduced in 2013, is a UK tax incentive designed to encourage large companies to invest in R&D in the UK. Companies can reduce their tax bill or claim payable cash credits as a proportion of their R&D expenditure.

The initiative builds on the existing R&D Tax Credit scheme which has been in operation for large companies since 2002 and is one of a number of technology tax relief schemes introduced by successive UK Governments. Originally referred to as "Above the Line R&D Tax Relief", because the payable credit for large companies is now shown above the tax line and can effectively be accounted for as income in the profit and loss statement, RDEC is now the common terminology used for the scheme.

== History ==
R&D tax relief is designed to incentivise investment in R&D. The scheme was introduced in 2000 for small and medium enterprises, with a separate scheme for large companies launched in 2002.

Any company carrying out R&D is likely to qualify for the relief. The definitions of eligible R&D and costs are reasonably broad, and eligible R&D can be found in completely unexpected areas.

Large companies could previously only offset the credit against corporation tax liabilities. This meant large businesses running R&D cost centres in the UK, but with profit centres outside the UK, were unable to benefit from the relief. It also meant the credit was largely invisible to R&D decision-makers because it was embedded in the tax computation.

As a result of lobbying from industry, the government launched a consultation in the 2012 Budget on changes to the Large Company R&D Tax Relief scheme. In the March 2013 Budget, the chancellor of the exchequer confirmed the new R&D Expenditure Credit for large companies with a payable rate of 10 per cent for R&D expenditure incurred after 1 April 2013 (an increase on the original proposal of a 9.1 per cent payable credit).

This credit is designed to make R&D relief more visible to those making R&D budgeting and investment decisions. It should also provide better cash flow for companies with no corporation tax liability, and thus should promote the UK as the preferred location for multi-national corporations deciding where to site their R&D operations. It will also help to improve corporate earnings because it now appears above the tax line.

== Overview ==
The 10 per cent payable credit rate equates to a net benefit post-tax of 7.7 per cent of eligible expenditure for large companies (at 23 per cent corporation tax from April 2013). The definitions of large and small company size are driven by the EU classifications (and adjusted for UK R&D Tax Credit purposes) including revenues, number of employees and balance sheet assets.

The chancellor of the exchequer announced in his 2014 Autumn Statement that the taxable credit available to companies claiming under the RDEC regime has been increased from 10% to 11% providing an after tax benefit of 8.8% of the qualifying R&D expenditure incurred after April 2015.

The existing large company superdeduction scheme will continue to run in parallel with the RDEC until April 2016, allowing a large company to claim the payable credit above the line or to deduct an additional 30 per cent of its eligible R&D costs in its tax computation.

The steady state cost of the RDEC, after the initial phasing-in period, is forecast to be approximately £265 million per annum (£170 million per the original proposal, plus £95 million for the increase in the payable rate to 10 per cent) in terms of corporation tax revenues foregone by HM Treasury.

== How it works ==
In all respects, the RDEC will work like the existing R&D Tax Credit. The nature of the tax relief has not changed, only the method of delivery of the tax relief.

There are various principles which need to be respected. Eligible R&D must be:

- seeking to achieve an advance in science or technology
- subject to scientific or technological uncertainty
- conducted in a systematic and thorough fashion

Eligible costs include staffing costs, consumables, software, subcontractors, prototype costs, clinical trial costs and research contributions. Critically these costs must be mapped to the eligible activities.

== How to claim ==
The claim process is as follows:

- assess qualifying R&D activity
- calculate qualifying R&D expenditure
- submit the figures in the CT600 tax return

HMRC recommend adequate record-keeping of eligible activities and eligible costs to provide a coherent audit trail in case of an enquiry by HMRC.

== Details in the legislation to look out for ==
- eligible R&D activity
- eligible R&D costs

== Other technology tax reliefs ==
- Research & Development Tax Credit
- Research & Development Capital Allowances
- Patent Box
- Creative Sector Tax Reliefs including Video Games Tax Relief, Animation Tax Relief, High-End TV Production Tax Relief, and Film Tax Relief

The Enterprise Investment Scheme (EIS) and Seed Enterprise Investment Scheme (SEIS) give generous income and capital gains tax relief to individuals who invest in small early stage businesses.

== See also ==
There are various sources of information about the R&D Expenditure Credit.

- The original source legislation (contained in the 2013 Finance Bill);
- HMRC’s published guidance in their Corporate Intangibles and R&D manual (CIRD);
- The Department for Business, Innovation and Skills guidance (now incorporated into the CIRD manual – see above)

== Government working group ==
The government established a Working Group, to complement ongoing public consultation on the R&D Tax Relief initiative and to discuss options and proposals in more detail. Members of the Working Group include representatives from: HMRC and HM Treasury; industry; the financial services community including large accounting firms (PWC; Deloitte; KPMG; Ernst and Young) and independent consultants (Alma Consulting), (MMP Tax), (Alexander Clifford); and representatives from professional bodies.
