= Kemerton =

Village in Worcestershire, England

Coordinates: 52.0328°N 2.0785°W

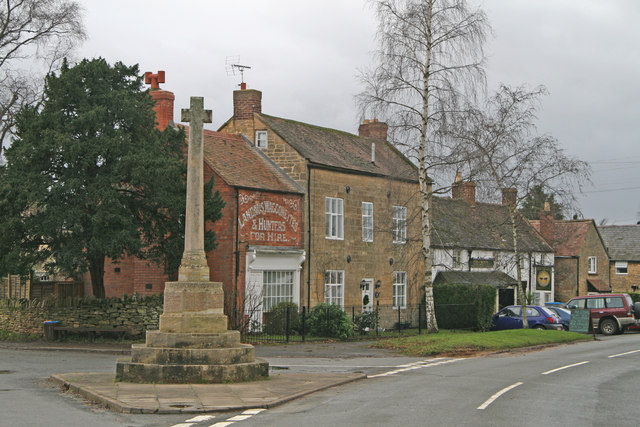
- Main street through the village of Kemerton

- Location within Worcestershire
- Population: 393 in 2001
- OS grid reference: SO94613720
- Civil parish: Kemerton
- District: Wychavon
- Shire county: Worcestershire
- Region: West Midlands
- Country: England
- Sovereign state: United Kingdom
- Post town: TEWKESBURY
- Postcode district: GL20
- Dialling code: 01386
- Police: West Mercia
- Fire: Hereford and Worcester
- Ambulance: West Midlands
- UK Parliament: West Worcestershire

Kemerton is a village and civil parish in Worcestershire in England. It lies at the extreme south of the county in the local government district of Wychavon. Until boundary changes in 1931, it formed part of neighbouring Gloucestershire, and it remains in the Diocese of Gloucester. The northern half of the parish lies within the Cotswolds Area of Outstanding Natural Beauty.

The parish is approximately 5.8 km (3.6 miles) long by 1.2 km (0.7 miles) wide, and encompasses approximately 6.738 square kilometres (1,665 acres). It descends from the summit of Bredon Hill in the north, (elevation 300 m / 981 ft) to the Carrant Brook in the south (elevation 20 m / 65 ft). The north and south parish boundaries are recorded in a Saxon charter of the 8th century.

The name Kemerton derives from the Old English Cyneburgingtūn meaning 'settlement connected with Cyneburg'.

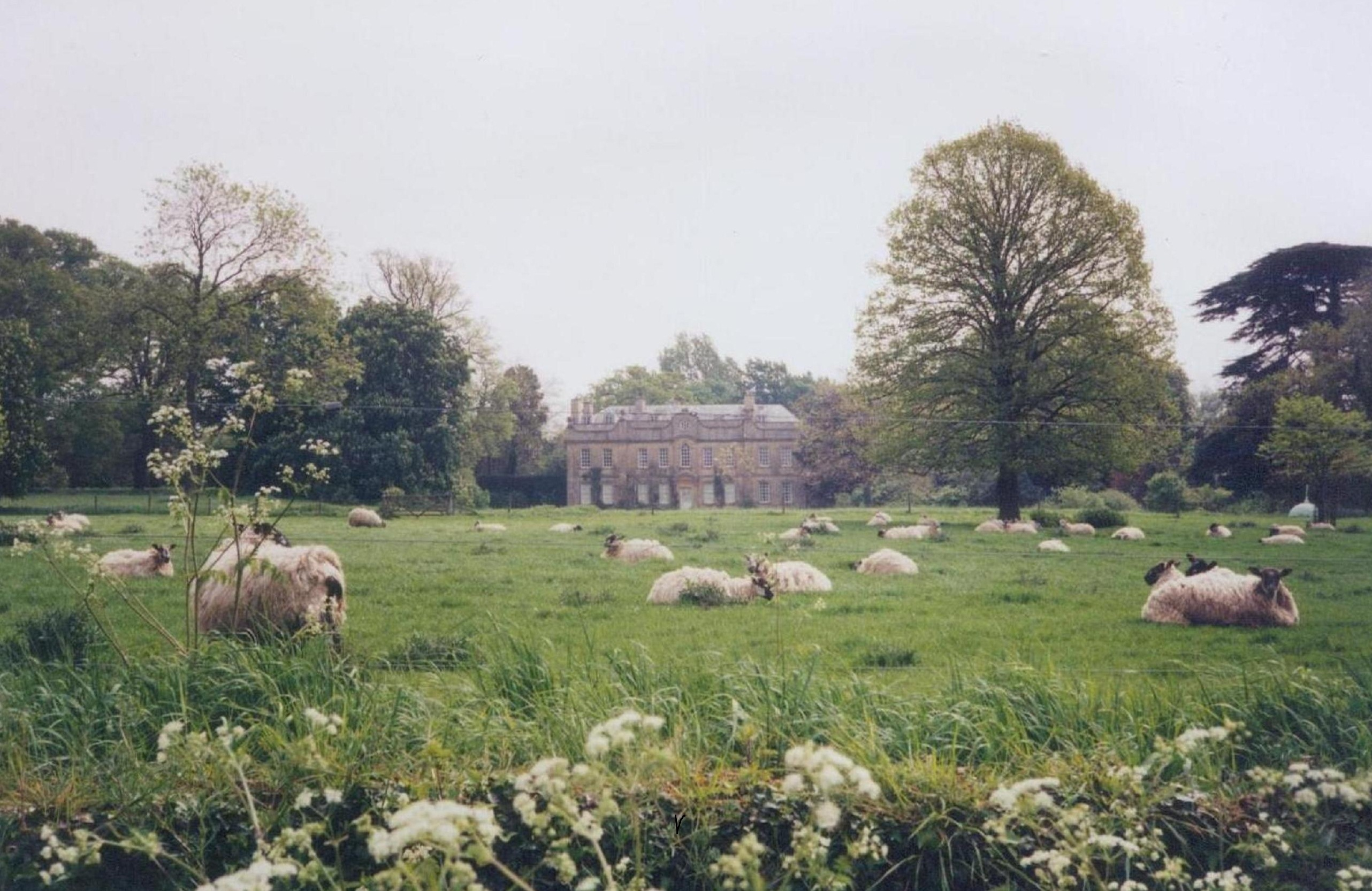
Kemerton Court from the park

== Historic features ==
Notable historic features include Kemerton Camp, an Iron Age hill fort surmounting Bredon Hill, thought to have been vacated suddenly after a considerable battle. Excavations at the camp in the 1930s uncovered, near the entrance to the inner ramparts, the remains of approximately 50 slaughtered individuals along with a large number of weapons. The fort, which encloses an area of 22 acres and features two sets of ramparts and ditches, had its inner rampart constructed around 300 BC and its outer rampart around the 1st century AD, after which the site was attacked, its gateways burned, and then abandoned. On the fort's south rampart is a two-storey stone tower known as Parsons Folly (or the Tower), built in the mid-18th century by John Parsons V, MP (1732–1805), the squire of Kemerton, who reputedly wished to raise the summit of Bredon Hill to 1000 ft (305 m). Significant buildings include the Church of St Nicholas and Kemerton Court, both of which are listed Grade II*.

The parish includes several important wildlife sites including the Kemerton Lake Nature Reserve and sections of the Bredon Hill Special Area of Conservation, which are managed by Kemerton Conservation Trust.

== Notable residents ==
Residents of Kemerton have included the anarchist publisher Charlotte Wilson, the bestselling author John Moore and YWCA leader Helen Malcolm.

== Bibliography ==
- Elrington, C.R. ed. (1968). Victoria County History: A History of the County of Gloucester, Volume VIII.
