= Research and Development Capital Allowances =

Tax credit

Research and Development Capital Allowances, also known as RDAs, are a tax relief for businesses in the United Kingdom. They provide a 100 per cent first year capital allowance for research and development (R&D) capital expenditure. RDAs are the capital expenditure equivalent to the R&D tax relief scheme.

== History ==
RDAs were the new name given to Scientific Research Allowances (which already existed) when the R&D Tax Credit scheme was launched in 2000.

== Overview ==
R&D Tax Relief only applies to revenue expenditure - generally, costs incurred on day-to-day operations, as opposed to expenditure on capital assets. However, RDAs allow relief for R&D capital expenditure as a capital allowance. RDAs make it possible to claim 100 per cent of the capital cost against taxable profits in the year the cost is incurred. This can deliver a helpful cash flow boost and a shortened payback period. A company should consider applying for RDAs if it has:

- constructed or purchased a laboratory, test bed, or pilot plant
- capitalised large amounts of R&D expenditure

If any R&D revenue expenditure is capitalised in a company's accounts, it may still qualify for R&D Tax Relief or it may only qualify under RDAs. The accounts treatment when the asset is recognised on the balance sheet, as opposed to being written-off immediately in the profit and loss account, is not conclusive of whether the expenditure is revenue or capital for tax purposes. The distinction between revenue and capital expenditure in the context of its R&D tax treatment is critical. HMRC give details on how to distinguish between the two categories on their website and in their CIRD manual. Further detail can also be found in section 1308 of Corporation Tax Act 2009 (which in turn updated section 53 of Finance Act 2004) in relation to the revenue treatment of capitalised costs which relate to intangible assets.

== How it works ==
RDAs are available for expenditure of a capital nature on R&D related to a company’s trade, e.g.:

- laboratories,
- other research facilities,
- research equipment,
- company cars used by people undertaking the R&D, and
- a new IT system for internal use in the R&D facility etc. etc.

So, unlike for R&D Tax Relief where only certain categories of expenditure can be claimed, RDAs are available on most expenditure incurred for the carrying out of, or provision of facilities for, R&D (except land and the cost of acquiring intellectual property). This includes building or premises assets which would not otherwise qualify for alternative forms of capital allowances (such as the Annual Investment Allowance).

This means that where a company acquires or builds property with the intention of using the property for the purposes of carrying on qualifying research and development, then most, if not all, of the expenditure involved will qualify for a 100 per cent capital allowance in the accounting period in which the expenditure is incurred.

== Other technology tax reliefs ==
- Research & Development Tax Credit
- Research & Development Expenditure Credit
- Patent Box
- Creative Sector Tax Reliefs including Video Games Tax Relief, Animation Tax Relief, High-End TV Production Tax Relief, and Film Tax Relief

The Enterprise Investment Scheme (EIS) and Seed Enterprise Investment Scheme (SEIS) give generous income and capital gains tax relief to individuals who invest in small early stage businesses.

== See also ==
There are various sources of information about RDAs.

- The original source legislation (contained in the 2001 Capital Allowances Act Part 6)
- HMRC’s published guidance in their Capital Allowances manual for RDAs;
- HMRC’s published guidance in their Corporate Intangibles and R&D manual (CIRD) re the treatment of revenue versus capital expenditure.

== Government working group ==
There is no formal government working group for RDAs. There is however a formal working group for R&D Tax Relief to assist and develop government thinking on R&D tax initiatives. Members of this Working Group include representatives from: HMRC and HM Treasury; industry; the financial services community including large accounting firms (PWC; Deloitte; KPMG; Ernst and Young) and independent consultants (MMP Tax); (Cashin Innovation Consulting); and representatives from professional bodies.
