= Mercia Asset Management =

British venture capital and investment firm

Mercia Fund Managers
- Company type: Public company
- Traded as: LSE: MERC
- Industry: Private equity
- Founded: 2010; 16 years ago in Birmingham
- Headquarters: Birmingham, United Kingdom
- Key people: Mark Payton; Mike Hayes; Tim Hazell; Stuart Palmer; Peter Dicks
- Number of employees: 85 (2019)
- Website: www.mercia.co.uk

Mercia Asset Management (Mercia) is a British venture capital and investment firm that provides venture capital to businesses focused on innovative technologies. Mercia offers investment under the Seed Enterprise Investment Scheme (SEIS) and the Enterprise Investment Scheme (EIS), both investment-based tax-reliefs, operating one of the largest such combined funds in the United Kingdom.

Startups in which Mercia has invested have gone on to earn awards for their innovations. Allinea Software was a 2011 Red Herring Global 100 winner and Molecular Solar earned the 2011 Lord Stafford Innovation in Development award.

In April 2021, Mercia co-authored a report on UK-India Energy Opportunities with think tank Bridge India and law firm Howard Kennedy.

== History ==
The company was co-founded as Mercia Fund Management by Mark Payton as a venture capital fund manager in 2010, after a buyout of WM Enterprise. Based in the United Kingdom, Mercia provides venture capital primarily to start-up businesses focused on innovative technologies. These startups are usually in the very early stages of development and often have yet to earn revenue. Mercia is led by Mark Payton, its managing director. Mark is a member of the Faculty of Science Engineering and Computing Advisory Board, Kingston University.

Mercia was initially set up to manage one of WM Enterprise's portfolios, the Mercia Fund 1, which was aimed at providing seed capital for innovative projects emanating from the University of Birmingham and the University of Warwick. The Mercia Fund 1 has since expanded its portfolio to other universities. Mercia Fund Management, now an independent firm, currently collaborates with eight universities within the West Midlands region of England, in addition to other unaffiliated startups, supporting technology innovations in a variety of sectors as well as a number of businesses that are not technology based. Mercia has Financial Conduct Authority authorisation. The fund is supported by shareholders including Forward Group, a private equity fund.

In 2014 Mercia Technologies PLC listed on Alternative Investment Market, raising £70.0million. Mercia Fund Management became the wholly owned subsidiary of Mercia Technologies. The Group at that point had 7 employees.

In 2019 the company changed its name to Mercia Asset Management PLC.

== Funds ==
Mercia Fund Management distributes and manages several funds including options under the UK's SEIS and EIS options.

Mercia Growth Fund

The Mercia Growth Fund was the first of Mercia's funds offered to retail investors. The Mercia Growth Fund was launched to take advantage of the SEIS and EIS tax incentives, under the UK's Finance Act. The SEIS is invested into startup businesses while the EIS is targeted at already established businesses looking to expand. The SEIS and EIS tax incentives provide income tax relief and removes capital gains tax, under certain conditions. The Mercia Growth Fund was invested in two separate rounds: the Mercia Growth Fund 1 was launched in 2012 and the Mercia Growth Fund 2 was launched in 2013.

Mercia Technology Seed Fund

The Mercia Technology Seed Fund invests in businesses with a viable technological concept but which may lack adequate revenue.

== Startups ==
Mercia has invested in startups in various fields. It invested in Oxford Genetics Ltd (a UK based DNA engineering company), in Warwick Audio Technologies from Warwick Ventures of the University of Warwick and in LM Technologies. The fund manager has also invested in Allinea Software, which was a winner in the Red Herring Global 100 and Molecular Solar, also from Warwick Ventures, which got the Lord Stafford Innovation in Development award, both in 2011.

In June 2014, Abzena was the first Mercia Fund Management company to be listed on a public stock exchange.
