= Research and Development Tax Credit =

UK tax incentive

Research and Development (R&D) Tax Credits are a UK tax incentive designed to encourage companies to invest in R&D. Companies can reduce their tax bill or claim payable cash credits as a proportion of their R&D expenditure.

== History ==
The scheme was introduced in 2000 for small and medium enterprises (SMEs), with a separate scheme for large companies launched in 2002 (see R&D Expenditure Credit or Above the Line R&D Tax Relief). Any company carrying out R&D is likely to qualify for the relief. The definitions of eligible R&D and eligible costs are reasonably broad, and eligible R&D activities often take place across the whole range of company operations.

Many other countries worldwide (e.g. Canada, France, the USA) already operated schemes to promote corporate R&D investment by the time the UK scheme commenced.

The UK government wanted to increase the UK R&D base by helping to reduce the cost of corporate R&D and thereby encourage companies to invest in R&D. In turn, this would increase innovation and wealth creation in the economy. There are two main types of R&D incentive structure: volume-based, where the credit is based on the absolute volume of R&D expenditure; and incremental-based, where the credit is driven by the increase in R&D spending over a base figure.

The UK scheme is volume-based because the incremental approach provides limited or no encouragement to businesses whose R&D spending fluctuates or remains at a steady level (for instance in times of macro-economic volatility).

== Overview ==
The net benefit after tax of the relief ranges from 7.7 per cent to 32.63 per cent of eligible expenditure depending on whether the claimant is a large or small profitable or loss making company. The definitions of large and small company size are driven by the EU classifications (and adjusted for UK R&D Tax Credit purposes) including revenues, number of employees and balance sheet assets.

The SME scheme works by allowing the SME to deduct an additional 130 per cent of its eligible R&D costs from its taxable income (a superdeduction). If the company has made a loss, then the scheme goes even further and allows the alternative of a cash payment of up to 32.63 per cent of the eligible R&D investment. The rate of the SME R&D tax credit enhancement has increased from 150 per cent when it was first introduced in 2000 to the rate of 225 per cent as at 2013.

The Chancellor of the Exchequer announced in his 2014 Autumn Statement that the super deduction rate for the SME relief regime has been increased from 225% to 230%, on expenditure incurred from 1 April 2015, providing a benefit of 26% of the qualifying expenditure.

The rate at which losses can be surrendered for a payable tax credit under the SME scheme remains at 14.5%, meaning loss making SME’s can receive a cash credit of 33.35 pence (previously 32.63 pence) for every pound spent on qualifying R&D.

A large company is able to claim an additional 30 per cent of its eligible R&D costs from its taxable income as a superdeduction. And with effect for qualifying expenditure incurred after 1 April 2013, the government introduced a new Research and Development Expenditure Credit (RDEC) which operates above the tax line, and until 2016, alongside the existing superdeduction scheme. The RDEC scheme makes it possible for large companies to claim a payable tax credit at a rate of 10 per cent of qualifying expenditure (rising to 11 per cent of qualifying expenditure incurred from 1 April 2015). This was further increased to 12% from 1 January 2018.

HMRC publish full details of the progression of the tax deduction and payable credit rates on their website .

The steady state cost of the whole scheme is approximately £1.3 billion per annum in terms of corporation tax revenues foregone by HM Treasury.

As at 2013, nearly 100,000 claims have been made and over £9.5 billion of relief has been claimed since the R&D tax credit scheme was launched. More than 28,000 different companies have made claims under the SME scheme, and 7,500 under the large company scheme

HMRC has also published an evaluation study of the uptake and impact of the scheme as at 2010 .

== SME and Large Company status for R&D tax relief purposes ==
The current EC recommendation of what constitutes a small or medium-sized enterprise was published in 2003 as 2003/361/EC. It replaced an older definition from 1996. The new recommendation was brought into effect for R&D tax relief purposes on 1 January 2005.

The EC SME thresholds were extended by UK legislation at 1 August 2008 (Corporation Tax Act 2009: Sections 1119 - 1121). The existing SME thresholds for UK R&D Tax Relief are as follows:

- fewer than 500 staff, and
- less than €100 million turnover (approx. £85 million) or
- less than €86 million gross balance sheet assets (approx. £73 million)

In effect, to fall within the SME definition, the enterprise must stay below the staff headcount ceiling and fall below at least one of the turnover and balance sheet total ceilings. If the enterprise fails to meet these targets, it is not considered an SME and must instead claim under the Large Company R&D Tax Relief scheme. The SME scheme is widely regarded as more generous as it offers up to 230% of R&D tax relief on qualifying costs, compared to around 130% relief on the Large Company Scheme.

Where an enterprise is part of a group of companies, the rules require interpretation of the relationship between the various group enterprises under categories of autonomous, partner, and linked relationship. Various exemptions are possible in these circumstances: for instance, where the holding is held by a "specified investment enterprise".

The detailed rules governing the interpretation of these criteria are covered in three main sources:

- the EU User Guide and Model Declaration, based on EC recommendation 2003/361/EC
- HMRC’s Corporate Intangibles R&D Manual and
- various parts of UK statutory legislation (e.g. as above Corporation Tax Act 2009)

Interpretation of the definition is usually straight forward, but is not always problem free. The Recommendation has been adopted into UK law, but it remains an EC Recommendation, made under European law, and its interpretation has to be in that context. In other words there is no read-across from the use of terms for UK tax law to interpretation of the Commission’s Recommendation.

== How it works ==
There are various principles which need to be respected. Eligible R&D must be

- seeking to achieve an advance in science or technology
- subject to scientific or technological uncertainty
- conducted in a systematic and thorough fashion

Eligible costs include staffing costs, consumable costs, software, subcontractors and research contributions. Critically these costs must be mapped to the eligible activities.

== How to claim ==
The claim process is as follows:

- assess qualifying R&D activity and R&D eligibility
- calculate qualifying R&D expenditure.
- submit the figures in the CT600 tax return.

Documentation Requirements:

HMRC became more stringent in assessing claims after several high-profile tribunal cases over fraudulent expenditure claims, costing taxpayers millions of pounds.

As a result of political and social pressure from these developments, HMRC adopted new guidelines in April 2019 that raised the standard of care required in submitting a claim. It has shown a willingness to launch enquiries into and reject previously accepted claims, such as ordering a company to refund paid credits – which could spell financial disaster for a company suddenly finding itself with a large tax bill.

Documentation of research projects is a key element in mitigating enquiries by HMRC and properly supporting any claims that do face enquiry. Case law shows the importance of clear and relevant supporting evidence, especially documentation, in substantiating challenged R&D claims.

HMRC recommend adequate record-keeping of eligible activities and eligible costs to provide a coherent audit trail in case of an enquiry by HMRC. They also publish a guide explaining how to make a claim on the UK Gov website

== Details in the legislation to look out for ==
- eligible R&D activity
- eligible R&D costs

== Other technology tax reliefs ==
- Research & Development Expenditure Credit (also known as Above the Line R&D Tax Relief)
- Research & Development Capital Allowances
- Patent Box
- Creative Sector Tax Reliefs including Video Games Tax Relief, Animation Tax Relief, High-End TV Production Tax Relief, and Film Tax Relief

The Enterprise Investment Scheme (EIS) and Seed Enterprise Investment Scheme (SEIS) give generous income and capital gains tax relief to individuals who invest in small early stage businesses.

== Government Working Group ==
The government established a Working Group, known as the R&D Consultative Committee to complement ongoing public consultation on the R&D Tax Relief initiatives and to discuss options and proposals in more detail. Members of the Working Group include representatives from: HMRC and HM Treasury; as well as agents, professional bodies, delegates from the industry as well as the primary business, technical and trade bodies. Other HMRC representatives and members from other governmental departments also participate.

== See also ==
There are various sources of information about R&D Tax Relief.

- The original source legislation (contained in various Finance Acts and Corporation Tax Acts;
- HMRC’s published guidance in their Corporate Intangibles and R&D manual (CIRD);
- The Department for Business, Innovation and Skills guidance (now incorporated into the CIRD manual – see above).
