= Tanacetum mucronulatum =

Scientific classification
- Kingdom: Plantae
- Clade: Tracheophytes
- Clade: Angiosperms
- Clade: Eudicots
- Clade: Asterids
- Order: Asterales
- Family: Asteraceae
- Genus: Tanacetum
- Species: T. mucronulatum

Binomial name
- Tanacetum mucronulatum (Hoffmanns. & Link) Heywood

Synonyms
- Pyrethrum mucronulatum Hoffmanns. & Link; Chrysanthemum mucronulatum (Hoffmanns. & Link) Cout.

Species of flowering plant

Tanacetum mucronulatum is a species of flowering plant in the daisy family Asteraceae, endemic to central and northern Portugal. It inhabits edges of woods and Quercus coccifera and hedges, on ultrabasic, schist or limestone soils.
