= Patent box =

Special low corporate tax regime on intangible assets

A patent box is a special very low corporate tax regime used by several countries to incentivise research and development by taxing patent revenues differently from other commercial revenues. It is also known as intellectual property box regime, innovation box or IP box. Patent boxes have also been used as base erosion and profit shifting (BEPS) tools, to avoid corporate taxes.

== History ==
In the early 1970s Ireland introduced the first scheme in its Corporation Tax. Section 34 of the 1973 Finance Act allowed total tax relief in respect of royalties and other income from licenses patented in Ireland.

The concept was applied in 2001 by the French Tax Authorities as a reduced rate of tax on revenue from IP licensing or the transfer of qualified IP. Within Europe, Belgium, Hungary, Luxembourg, Netherlands, Spain and the United Kingdom have also introduced similar schemes.

In the United States, Patent Box legislation has been introduced by Congress several times since 2007 but has not been enacted. In July 2015, Reps. Charles Boustany, R-La., and Richard Neal, D-Mass., introduced a discussion draft of the Innovation Promotion Act of 2015. Citing pressures introduced by the current economic climate, this act again aims to introduce a patent box to the Internal Revenue Code.

== Controversy ==
The Irish Patent Box system is one of the key benefits for companies paying Irish corporation tax. The system was criticised by Lionel Jospin in the early 2000s and more recently by both the EU (Ecofin assessment 2014) and the OECD under its Base Erosion and Profit-Shifting (BEPS) project. The system has been key to attracting international IT companies to Ireland. The economic benefits of beneficial tax regimes for revenues from patents led to similar schemes being introduced in France in 2000 and amended there in 2005 and 2010.

== Schemes by country ==
=== Cyprus ===
The Cyprus IP box rules were amended in October 2016, with effect from July 2016, to align the regime with the OECD modified nexus approach. Qualifying intellectual property includes patents, copyrighted software, utility models and certain other innovative intellectual property. Marketing-related intellectual property, including trademarks, does not qualify. The regime provides an 80% deduction on qualifying profits. Subject to the applicable nexus fraction, this can result in an effective tax rate of 3% following the increase of the Cyprus corporate income tax rate to 15% from 1 January 2026.On 17 July 2020, the Cypriot House of Representatives approved a bill amending Section 9(1)(l) of the Income Tax Law concerning the tax treatment of intangible assets. Where the disposal of an intangible asset constitutes a transaction of a capital nature, the resulting capital gain is not taxable. The changes took effect from 1 January 2020 and abolished the requirement to prepare a balancing statement upon the transfer or sale of an intangible asset.

=== Ireland ===
The scheme which had existed since 1973 was withdrawn in 2010 under the National recovery Plan 2011-2015 of the Republic of Ireland imposed by the European Financial Stability Facility and the IMF. It exempted revenue from qualifying Patents from Irish corporation tax. The exemption is to be replaced by a "Knowledge Development Box" in 2015 offering a reduced tax rate of 6.25% on qualifying profits generated in periods commencing on or after 1 January 2016.

The key difference in the Irish KDB to those of other European countries is its compliance with the OECD's Base Erosion and Profit Shifting (BEPS) programme, Ireland's is the first patent-box type system to offer compliance in this area. Companies availing of the current R&D tax credit should be aware of the KDB and the potential for them to take advantage of both systems.

=== France ===
Introduced in 1979 the Patents and royalties regime allows companies paying French corporation tax to pay a reduced rate of 15% (instead of 33%) on patent and royalties income as they are treated as a long term capital gain. If the licensee is a French corporation and actually uses the qualified IP licensed, the licensee may deduct the royalty payments from its income taxable at the standard 33.33% rate even if the licensor is taxed at the reduced 15% rate

=== Netherlands ===
The Netherlands introduced a patent box tax regime referred to as the ‘innovation box’ in January 2007. This initial regime applied only to patents and applied a 10% rate of corporate tax. On 1 January 2010 the regime was expanded to include a much wider range of IP and the headline rate was reduced to 5%. The reduced rate of corporate tax applies to the net positive income derived from the qualifying IP ( gross income minus all related expenses and depreciation).

=== Belgium ===
The patent box scheme in Belgium was introduced in January 2007, and is known as a patent income deduction (PID). The last revision applies from July 2016. This PID allows a company, liable to pay Corporation Tax in Belgium, to deduct from its taxable income 85% of gross patent income. The remaining 15% of gross patent income is taxed at the standard corporation tax rate of 34% (including a 3% surtax). This results in an effective tax rate of 5.1% on the qualifying income.

=== Luxembourg ===
In Luxembourg the Patent box IP regime became effective in January 2008 and amended in 2008 to also exclude qualifying IP assets from Luxembourg's net wealth tax. The regime applies to the net income derived from the use of qualifying intellectual property acquired or developed after December 2007. 80% of income is exempted, giving an effective tax rate of 5.76%.

The Patent box IP regime was abolished in 2016 in response to BEPS concerns. IP regimes claimed before July 2016 can still continue to benefit from the preferential rate for the next 5 years. In March 2018, Luxembourg created a new IP regime following the OECD criteria.

=== Hungary ===
Hungary introduced a scheme in 2003 including a provision according to which 50% of the pre-tax amount of the royalties received may be deducted from the tax base, this reducing the effective corporate tax rate on such royalties from 9% to 4.5%. The legislation is BEPS compliant.

=== Spain ===
As of January 1, 2008, 50% of the gross income of Spanish domiciled companies derived from qualified Intellectual Property is exempt from Spain's Corporation tax resulting in an effective tax rate of 15%.

=== United Kingdom ===
The United Kingdom introduced a Patent Box scheme in 2013 taxing qualifying IP at 10%. The Patent Box in the UK is a tax incentive introduced in 2013 designed to encourage companies to make profits from their patents by reducing the UK tax paid on those profits.

==== History ====
The UK Patent Box went live in April 2013. The UK government wants to encourage high-value growth in UK plc through a competitive tax regime that supports UK R&D from conception to commercialisation. The Patent Box forms a key part of this strategy by encouraging companies to commercialise their patents and R&D in the UK. Other countries (e.g., Belgium, Luxembourg, the Netherlands) already operate schemes to provide incentives for companies to retain and commercialise existing patents.

The scheme was first proposed in the 2009 Pre-Budget Report and went through various iterations and public consultations until final legislation was passed in the Finance Act 2012. The legislation is now formally a new Part 8A of the Corporation Tax Act 2010 entitled "Profits Arising from the Exploitation of Patents etc". The Finance (No. 2 Bill) 2015/16 includes proposed amendments, which, if implemented, will amend the patent box rules.

The Patent Box initiative is complementary to the R&D tax incentives which encourage companies to undertake their R&D in the UK.

The Patent Box allows a 10% tax rate on profits derived from any products that incorporate patents. The net benefit for claiming companies is likely to be several percentage points of their corporate earnings, given that the main rate of UK corporation tax is 19 per cent.

The steady state cost, after the initial phasing- in period, of the Patent Box is forecast to be approximately £1.1 billion in terms of corporation tax revenues foregone by HM Treasury.

The claim process is as follows:

- calculate qualifying income by identifying revenue streams from qualifying patents,
- calculate the profit generated from this qualifying income,
- then calculate residual profit by deducting routine profit made from routine business activities,
- then calculate the Patent box profit by deducting any profits derived from branding or marketing attributes
- then use the HMRC formula to calculate the corporate tax deduction.

==== How to claim ====
Companies must calculate their qualifying Patent Box profit and then apply a specific formula in their tax computation to calculate the deduction in their tax liability. Then they can take the tax deduction as a benefit in their CT600 tax return. The formula to calculate the amount of the tax deduction is

$$\mathbf{P} \mathbf{B} \times \left ( \frac {MR-PBR} {MR} \right )$$

where

- PB is the Patent Box profit for the company,
- MR is the main rate of corporation tax, and
- PBR is the special Patent Box tax rate (10 per cent)

==== Qualifying patents ====
Qualifying patents must have been granted by an approved patent-granting body, including the UK Intellectual Property Office, the European Patent Office, and designated European territories: Austria; Bulgaria; the Czech republic; Denmark; Estonia; Finland; Germany; Hungary; Poland; Portugal; Romania; Slovakia and Sweden.

Currently, the Patent Box excludes patents registered in territories such as the US, France, and Spain because of differences in the search and approval process for patent applications.

The Patent Box excludes products that only have copyright or trademark protection.

==== Qualifying income ====
There are five categories (“heads”) of qualifying income:

- head 1: worldwide income from the sale of products incorporating at least one embedded patent (and including income from sale of integral spare parts)
- head 2: licence fees or royalties from qualifying IP
- head 3: sale or disposal of qualifying IP and rights over qualifying IP
- heads 4 & 5: damages/compensation income from infringement/loss of sales of qualifying IP rights

Income generated from exclusive licenses will be qualifying income on both sides of the agreement – i.e. for the licensor and the licensee – subject to specific conditions concerning the meaning of exclusivity.

“IP-derived income”, where patented products or processes are used in the manufacture or delivery of non-patented products or services, will be qualifying income to the extent of a notional royalty which values the specific patented product or process as a proportion of the value of the non-patented product or service.

==== Qualifying company ====
- must hold qualifying IP rights
- must elect into the scheme
- must fulfill “development” and/or “active ownership” conditions

==== Details in the legislation to look out for ====
- notional royalty
- notional marketing royalty and marketing intangibles (including transfer pricing)
- streaming
- meaning of exclusivity
- R&D shortfall

==== Anti-avoidance ====
The following situations will be against the law:

- where a functionally irrelevant patent is incorporated into a product with the sole purpose of achieving Patent Box eligibility
- commercially irrelevant grant of exclusivity with the sole purpose of achieving Patent Box eligibility
- any scheme designed to inflate artificially qualifying IP income or qualifying Patent Box profits.

Reasonable and commercially appropriate steps to restructure corporate arrangements to take advantage of the Patent Box will be considered legitimate.

==== Other technology tax reliefs ====
- Research and Development Tax Credit
- Research and Development Expenditure Credit
- Above the Line R&D Tax Relief
- Research and Development Capital Allowances
- Creative Sector Tax Reliefs including Video Games Tax Relief, Animation Tax Relief, High-end TV Production Tax Relief, and Film Tax Relief

The Enterprise Investment Scheme (EIS) and Seed Enterprise Investment Scheme (SEIS) give generous income and capital gains tax relief to individuals who invest in small early stage businesses.

==== Government working group ====
The government established a working group to complement wider consultation on the Patent Box and to discuss options and proposals in more detail. Members of the Working Group include representatives from: HMRC and HM Treasury; industry (GlaxoSmithKline, Dyson, ARM and Syngenta amongst others), the financial services community including large accounting firms (PWC, Deloitte, KPMG and Ernst and Young); independent consultants and representatives from the technology commercialisation sphere and professional bodies.

==== OECD Forum for Harmful Tax Practices and the EU Code of Conduct Group ====
The UK government is in the process of gathering evidence to submit to the Forum for Harmful Tax Practices (FHTP), part of the Organisation for Economic Co-operation and Development (OECD), in the forum's work on international base erosion and profit shifting, specifically Action Point 5 of the OECD Action Plan published in July 2013. The forum provides member countries with the opportunity to review each other's tax arrangements and to challenge harmful tax initiatives.

Action 5 focuses on “substantial activity” that must occur in a jurisdiction for a company to benefit from a specific preferential tax regime.

The UK government publicly supports the current work around Action 5 to ensure a better understanding of what constitutes economic substance when businesses carry out R&D activities, so as to effectively address those instances where preferential tax regimes might present an opportunity to shift profits.

Options being discussed include a new method of calculating benefits for IP-incentive tax schemes. This is the so-called nexus approach (where underlying expenditure to create the IP is used to define the proportion of qualifying income generated from the IP), rather than the conventional transfer pricing approach (where transfer pricing principles define a substantial activity test and either the IP commercialisation activity passes the test or it does not, and all IP income thus either qualifies or it does not).

These discussions are also informed by work being carried out by the Economic and Financial Affairs Council (ECOFIN) and the EU Code of Conduct Group, which started in 2013 to look at the workings of the UK Patent Box scheme. The Code of Conduct Group operates on a similar basis to the FHTP. The Code of Conduct Group partnered with the FHTP in these discussions in early 2014.

==== Anglo-German accord on the UK Patent Box ====
Following a sustained period of international tax scrutiny led by Germany in the FHTP and the EU Code of Conduct Group, a compromise agreement for the UK patent box scheme based on a modified nexus approach was announced by the UK and Germany on 11 November 2014. The acceptance of a nexus based approach will have significant implications for the UK patent box scheme; fundamentally, patent box relief will now be restricted to profits generated from IP initially developed in the UK. The main points in the Anglo-German accord have been announced as follows:

- a 30% uplift will be allowed to increase the value of the eligible R&D expenditure proxy for outsourcing or acquisition costs
- the existing UK regime will be closed to new entrants (for both products and patents) in June 2016 (and the existing scheme will be abolished in full by June 2021)
- IP within the existing regime will be able to retain the benefits of the scheme until June 2021, to allow time for transition to the new nexus regime
- a practical and proportionate tracking and tracing approach will be introduced that can be implemented by companies and tax authorities with practical methodologies that companies and tax authorities can adopt to map R&D expenditure to IP creation.

The UK and Germany submitted their proposal to the OECD Forum on Harmful Tax Practices during its meeting on 17–19 November, and they have also committed to seek formal approval from the OECD and G20 at the January 2015 meeting of the OECD's Committee on Fiscal Affairs.

=== Switzerland ===
==== Mixed-company ====
Switzerland allows companies who predominantly trade internationally to benefit from the advantageous “mixed-company” status that allows them to be taxed at a rate of just 8,5%. In 2007 the European Commission alleged the tax schemes for holding, mixed and domiciliary companies violated the 1972 FTA between the EU and Switzerland because it was by the Commission as "State Aid". Although the Swiss government refuted the allegation in May 2012, the Swiss cantons gave the federal government the go-ahead to commence a tax dialogue with the EU. In May 2014 the EU and Switzerland reached an agreement whereby the disputed tax regimes would be abolished.

==== Nidwalden Licence-Box regime ====
In 2011 the canton of Nidwalden introduced the Licence Box rule which allows companies located in Nidwalden to benefit from a cantonal tax rate on net license income reduced by 80% the effective corporate income tax rate is 8.8%

== See also ==
- Tax law
