= John Moore (British writer) =

British author (1907–1967)

- Born: 10 November 1907 Tewkesbury, Gloucestershire, England
- Died: 27 July 1967 (aged 59) Bristol, England
- Occupation: Author
- Subject: Countryside, Rural Life
- Spouse: Lucile Douglas Stephens (m. 1944)

John Cecil Moore (10 November 1907 – 27 July 1967) was a British writer and conservationist. He was described by Sir Compton Mackenzie as the most talented writer about the countryside of his generation. His best-selling trilogy, published in the years immediately after the Second World War – Portrait of Elmbury, Brensham Village and The Blue Field – was followed by a series of novels and self-styled 'country-contentments'.

== Literary career ==
Moore was the author of more than 40 published works, most of which explored themes relating to rural life in the first half of the 20th century. He wrote the commentary for the 1957 documentary The England of Elizabeth, which is noted for its score composed by Vaughan Williams.

From 1943 to 1949 Moore was the organiser of the Tewkesbury Play Festival. He was also a founder and driving force behind the Cheltenham Literary Festival which was inaugurated in 1949. He contributed a weekly column on rural matters to the Birmingham Mail for eighteen years and was a frequent broadcaster on Midlands radio.

== Conservation ==
Moore's naturalist talents originated from his schooldays, and he campaigned for rural conservation in his local area, and in his many books, most of which had a rural setting. Long before the environment came to mainstream media attention, he wrote about some of the negative effects of technological advances on the countryside and rural life.

Moore also fought to conserve the architectural heritage of Tewkesbury in Gloucestershire, his native town.

== Personal life ==
Moore was born in Tewkesbury in 1907, where he is commemorated by the John Moore Primary School and the John Moore Countryside Museum.

In the Second World War, he served as a carrier-based pilot in the Fleet Air Arm, and this experience was reflected in several books including a history of the Fleet Air Arm; after recovering from rheumatic fever, he was posted to Supreme Allied Headquarters as a press attaché, landing in Normandy on D-Day+1.

While serving in the Royal Navy, he met Wren Lucile Douglas Stephens, a daughter of noted Australian pediatrician, Henry Douglas Stephens, and they married on 1 April 1944. There were no children born to this marriage. During the latter part of his life, he and his wife lived in the village of Kemerton on the slopes of Bredon Hill, which he popularised as 'Brensham Hill' in a number of his writings. He died in of cancer in Bristol in 1967. Lucile married again and died in 2003.

== Selected works ==
- Dixon's Cubs (1930)
- The Book of the Fly-rod (ed, with Hugh Sheringham) (1931)
- Dear Lovers (1931)
- Tramping Through Wales (1931)
- English Comedy (1932)
- King Carnival
- The Walls are Down (1933)
- The Welsh Marches (1933)
- The New Forest (1934)
- Country Men (Biography) (1935)
- The Angler's week-end Book (ed, with Eric Taverner) (1935)
- Overture, Beginners! (1936)
- The Cotswolds (1937)
- Clouds of Glory (1938)
- A Walk Through Surrey (1939)
- The Countryman's England (1939)
- Life and Letters of Edward Thomas (ed) (1939)
- Wit's End (1942)
- Fleet Air Arm (history) (1943)
- Escort Carrier (1944)
- The Navy and the Y Scheme (1944)
- Portrait of Elmbury (1945)
- Brensham Village (1946)
- The Fair Field (1946)
- The Blue Field (1948)
- Dance and Skylark (1951)
- Midsummer Meadow (1953)
- Tiger, Tiger (short stories) (1953)
- The Season of the Year (1954)
- The White Sparrow (1954)
- The Boy's Country Book (ed) (1955)
- Come Rain, Come shine (1956)
- September Moon (1957)
- Jungle Girl (1958)
- Man and Bird and Beast (1959)
- You English Words (1961)
- The Elizabethans (1962)
- The Year of the Pigeons (1963)
- Best Fishing Stories (1965)
- The Waters Under the Earth (1965)

== Legacy ==
John Moore and 'Elmbury' are commemorated at a number of locations in the Tewkesbury area, including:

- The John Moore Museum near Tewkesbury Abbey
- The John Moore Nature Reserve, created and managed by Kemerton Conservation Trust on land in the village of Kemerton once owned by the author.
- the name 'Elmbury' was given to the new Secondary Modern School for Girls on Ashchurch Road in the 1960s, which later became the nucleus of today's Tewkesbury School
- "The John Moore Primary School" built on the Wheatpieces estate in September 2000
- the "Elmbury Suite" opened at Tewkesbury Hospital in January 2001
- a public house called "Elmbury Lodge", near Junction 9 of the M5 Motorway, opened in 2004
- The Tewkesbury branch of the Embroiderers' Guild is called the "Elmbury (Tewkesbury) Branch"
