= Pocket Canons =

The Pocket Canons is the name of a series of small books, designed by Pentagram Partner, Angus Hyland, featuring the text of individual Books of the Bible along with introductions by various well-known authors and public figures, such as Doris Lessing and Bono. The Bible texts are drawn from the King James Version of the Bible. The series was conceived by Matthew Darby, who published it in partnership with Canongate Books in the UK. The series has now (2006) been published in 12 languages and in 16 countries, selling well over a million copies. The US publisher of the Pocket Canons is Grove/Atlantic Inc.

== Pocket Canons: Series 1 ==
Book of the Bible	Text at Wikisource	UK Introduction Writer	US Introduction Writer	UK ISBN	US ISBN
Genesis	Genesis	Steven Rose	E. L. Doctorow	ISBN 0-86241-789-9	ISBN 0-8021-3610-9
Exodus	Exodus	David Grossman		ISBN 0-8021-3611-7	ISBN 0-8021-3611-7
Job	Job	Louis de Bernières	Charles Frazier	ISBN 0-86241-791-0	ISBN 0-8021-3612-5
Proverbs	Proverbs	Charles Johnson		ISBN 0-86241-792-9	ISBN 0-8021-3613-3
Song of Solomon	Song of Solomon	A. S. Byatt		ISBN 0-86241-793-7	ISBN 0-8021-3615-X
Ecclesiastes	Ecclesiastes	Doris Lessing		ISBN 0-86241-794-5	ISBN 0-8021-3614-1
Matthew	Matthew	A. N. Wilson	Francisco Goldman	ISBN 0-86241-795-3	ISBN 0-8021-3616-8
Mark	Mark	Nick Cave	Barry Hannah	ISBN 0-86241-796-1	ISBN 0-8021-3617-6
Luke	Luke	Richard Holloway	Thomas Cahill	ISBN 0-86241-797-X	ISBN 0-8021-3616-8
John	John	Blake Morrison	Darcey Steinke	ISBN 0-86241-798-8	ISBN 0-8021-3619-2
Corinthians (1 & 2)	First Corinthians; Second Corinthians	Fay Weldon		ISBN 0-86241-799-6	ISBN 0-8021-3620-6
Revelation	Revelation	Will Self	Kathleen Norris	ISBN 0-86241-800-3	ISBN 0-8021-3621-4

== Pocket Canons: Series 2 ==
Book of the Bible	Text at Wikisource	Introduction Writer	ISBN (UK only)
Ruth & Esther	Ruth / Esther	Joanna Trollope	ISBN 0-86241-968-9
Samuel (1 & 2)	1 Samuel; 2 Samuel	Meir Shalev	ISBN 0-86241-967-0
Psalms	Psalms	Bono	ISBN 0-86241-969-7
Isaiah	Isaiah	Peter Ackroyd	ISBN 0-86241-970-0
Jonah, Micah & Nahum	Jonah / Micah / Nahum	Alasdair Gray	ISBN 0-86241-971-9
Wisdom	Wisdom of Solomon	Piers Paul Read	ISBN 0-86241-980-8
Acts of the Apostles	Acts of the Apostles	P. D. James	ISBN 0-86241-973-5
Romans	Romans	Ruth Rendell	ISBN 0-86241-972-7
Hebrews	Hebrews	Karen Armstrong	ISBN 0-86241-974-3
