= Angus Hyland =

British graphic designer

Angus Hyland (born 1963 in Brighton, East Sussex) is a British graphic designer and visual artist.

== Biography ==
Hyland studied information design at the London College of Printing and Graphic Art and Design at the Royal College of Art. After running his own studio in Soho in London for ten years, he became a partner in Pentagram's London offices in 1998.

He has worked with AkzoNobel, Asprey, the BBC, the British Council, the British Museum, Canongate Books, Citibank, the Crafts Council, Eat, Getty Images, Grant Thornton International, Nokia, Penguin Random House, Phaidon Press, Pocket Canons, the Royal Academy of Arts, Maersk, Rolls-Royce, Samsung, The Sage Gateshead, Shakespeare's Globe and the Tate Modern.

In 2005, Hyland became consultant creative director to Laurence King Publishing, working in design, brand management, and generating new book concepts. In 2015, he redesigned Eurosport's branding in the first major overhaul in 26 years. Hyland was the curator of "Picture This", a British Council touring exhibition of contemporary London-based illustrators, and "Ballpoint", an exhibition of works by fifty artists created with or inspired by the ballpoint pen.

Hyland has authored thirteen books on art and graphic design, and was elected a member of Alliance Graphique Internationale (AGI) in 1999. In 2002 he received and honorary Master of Arts from the Surrey Institute of Art & Design. In 2012 Hyland was made a visiting fellow at the University of the Arts London. In 2014 and 2015 he served as an External Examiner on the MA Graphic Design course at the Royal College of Art. The Purple Book, published in June 2013 received the Book of the Year Award from the British Book Design and Production Awards.

In June 2021 Hyland painted ten notebook covers for Pith's Creative Commissions, which were sold to raise money for Makebank. In July 2021, he held his debut exhibition of paintings at the Cass Art Space in Glasgow. Later that year, Hyland's paintings 'Looking for a certain ratio' were included in the 'Design House' exhibition as part of the London Design Festival 2021.

As part of the 2023 London Design Festival, ‘Bags of Art & Design’, Hyland's collaboration with fellow Pentagram Partner Jon Marshall and client, Cass Art, was exhibited at Cromwell Place.

Hyland's work has won five D&AD Yellow Pencils and the Grand Prix from the Scottish Design Awards. He also appeared in Independent on Sunday's "Top Ten Graphic Designers in the UK." Hyland writes a monthly column about logos for Transform. He is married to writer and illustrator Marion Deuchars.

== Writing ==
- Pen and Mouse: Commercial Art and Digital Illustration, Edited by Angus Hyland: Laurence King Publishing 2001
- Hand to Eye: Contemporary Illustration, Edited by Angus Hyland and Roanne Bell: Laurence King Publishing 2003
- C/ID:Visual Identity and Branding for the Arts, Edited by Angus Hyland and Emily King: Laurence King Publishing 2006
- The Picture Book: Contemporary Illustration: Edited by Angus Hyland: Laurence King Publishing 2006
- Symbol, Edited by Angus Hyland and Steven Bateman: Laurence King Publishing 2011
- The Purple Book: Symbolism and Sensuality in Contemporary Art and Illustration, Written by Angus Hyland and Angharad Lewis: Laurence King Publishing 2013
- The Book of the Dog, Written by Angus Hyland and Kendra Wilson: Laurence King Publishing 2015
- The Book of the Bird, Written by Angus Hyland and Kendra Wilson: Laurence King Publishing 2016
- The Book of the Cat, Written by Angus Hyland and Caroline Roberts: Laurence King Publishing 2017
- The Maze: A Labyrinthine Compendium, Written by Angus Hyland and Kendra Wilson: Laurence King Publishing 2018
- The Book of the Horse, Written by Angus Hyland and Caroline Roberts: Laurence King Publishing 2018
- The Book of the Tree, Written by Angus Hyland and Kendra Wilson: Laurence King Publishing 2021
- The Book of the Raven, Written by Angus Hyland and Caroline Roberts: Laurence King Publishing 2021

== See also ==
- Pentagram (design studio)
