= The England of Elizabeth =

1957 documentary film

- Directed by: John Taylor
- Written by: John Moore
- Produced by: Ian Ferguson
- Narrated by: Alec Clunes
- Cinematography: James Ritchie
- Edited by: John Legard
- Music by: Ralph Vaughan Williams
- Production company: British Transport Films
- Release date: 1957
- Running time: 26 minutes
- Country: United Kingdom
- Language: English

The England of Elizabeth (also known as England under Elizabeth) is a 1957 Technicolor documentary short film about the Elizabethan age, directed by John Taylor for British Transport Films. The script was by Gloucestershire novelist John Moore.

== Cast ==
- Alec Clunes as narrator

== Score ==
The film is noted for its score composed by Ralph Vaughan Williams, which was the basis for his concert work Three Portraits from the England of Elizabeth.

== Reception ==
The Monthly Film Bulletin wrote: "This colourful and satisfying film takes us on an artistic pilgrimage through Elizabethan England. Stately homes, familiar pictures, furniture, china, music and, of course, Shakespeare, are all used to evoke the spirit of a period and a tradition. The matching of image and text is often subtly contrived; Alec Clunes speaks the commentary with quiet dignity and Vaughan Williams' score provides an apt accompaniment, notably in the episodes dealing with the Spanish Armada."

Kine Weekly wrote: "Highly interesting and entertaining Technicolor featurette which recaptures much of the glory of the first Elizabethan Age through still existent relics, books, stately homes and picturesque places. The rich material has been skilfully compiled, but pedantry is avoided, the commentary flows evenly and the scenic and photographic qualities are outstanding. Excellent British short."
