= Vernon Heywood =

British botanist (1927–2022)

Vernon Hilton Heywood
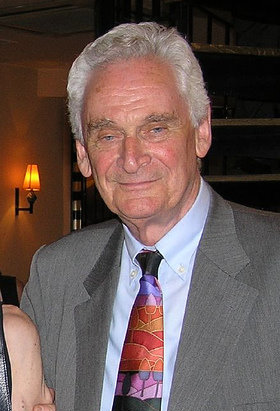
- Born: Vernon Hilton Nathan; 24 December 1927; Edinburgh, Scotland
- Died: 17 September 2022 (aged 94); Reading, England
- Other name: Hilton Vernon Nathan
- Education: University of Edinburgh; University of Cambridge
- Spouse: 1. María de la Concepción (1952 - 1981; divorce) 2. Catherine A. Heywood (married 1981)
- Children: 4
- Scientific career
- Fields: plant taxonomy and conservation
- Workplaces: University of Liverpool; University of Reading
- Author abbrev. (botany): Heywood

Vernon Hilton Heywood (born Vernon Hilton Nathan; 24 December 1927 – 17 September 2022) was a British plant biologist. He specialised in medicinal and aromatic plants, and the conservation of wild relatives of plants. Heywood led modern plant taxonomy and global strategies for plant conservation as well as the training of generations of botanists, taxonomists, and conservationists in the UK and other countries.

== Early life and education ==
Vernon Hilton Nathan was born in Edinburgh, Scotland on 24 December 1927. He later changed his name to Vernon Hilton Heywood. The family changed their name from Nathan to Heywood in 1938. He studied at George Heriot's School in Edinburgh. He attended University of Edinburgh 1945 - 1949, graduating with B. Sc. Science (Plant Science). He then moved to Pembroke College, University of Cambridge (1949 - 1953) for doctoral studies supervised by Eldred Corner about plant taxonomy, especially of species found in Spain. His doctorate was awarded in 1954. In around 1970 he was awarded D. Sc. by University of Edinburgh.

== Career ==
Heywood was based in Spain from 1952 until October 1955. He was appointed lecturer at University of Liverpool, UK in 1955, promoted to senior lecturer in 1960 and to reader in 1963. He was promoted to the second established Chair in Botany in 1964. However, he left Liverpool for University of Reading in 1968 where he was appointed Professor of Botany, Head of Department and also Director of the University's Botanic Garden. Heyward later became Director of the School of Biological Sciences (1972-1975) and Dean of the Faculty of Science (1978-1981). Although he retired in 1987, he remained actively involved in several projects until his death in 2022.

His scientific research was primarily in systematics and taxonomy. He first visited Spain in 1947 at the instigation of William Wright Smith while an undergraduate at Edinburgh to accompany the Popular Gardening magazine editor Herbert Cowley and the alpine plant specialist Paul Giuseppi (who died soon after this visit). They aimed to collect rare plants and the experience had a significant impact on his scientific and personal life. It led to his first scientific publication and the direction of his research into taxonomy and systematics. The following year, 1948 he returned for three months to Spain with Peter Hadland Davis who was a student with him at Edinburgh. They collected seeds, bulbs and corms as well as over 1000 herbarium specimens. Some of the species that he saw had not previously been described, such as Geranium cazorlanum and Aquilegia cazorlense. He made further collecting visits to Spain in subsequent years, and the Spanish flora and Spanish botanists were important for the rest of his career. He applied this to his teaching which led to a more modern approach, integrating evolutionary systematics with practical taxonomy. At both Liverpool and Reading he led extended fieldwork by undergraduate students to several areas in Spain. These became collaborative with students and staff from the University of Murcia and the botanic garden of the University of València.

Heyward was secretary and co-editor of the Flora Europaea project which was led by Tom Tutin, University of Leicester from 1954. The administration of the project was based with Heywood and he was instrumental in some of the fund raising. He started working on this project when he was at Liverpool. The administration of the Flora Europaea project was based with him, so it moved to Reading when he went there in 1968.

He became more interested in conservation of endangered plant species as his career progressed. He continued to travel widely around the world to visit botanists and botanic gardens especially in the Mediterranean, Neotropics, India and China, and wrote reports for international organisations that raised the profile of plants in the conservation world. He also emphasised the need to conserve useful plants (in situ or as stored germplasm) such as one with medicinal, aromatic and culinary uses as well as crop wild relatives. Heywood was involved as an organiser and contributor to several international organisations and projects such as one involving FAO and the International Union for Conservation of Nature (IUCN) . In particular, this led to better data curation, storage and access on European and Mediterranean plant taxonomy and distributions. He was an advisor and chief scientist to the IUCN and created a specialist group for medicinal plants that has subsequently become part of the Species Survival Commission. He also formed a Conservation in Botanic Gardens specialist group within the ICUN, and in 1987 he founded the Botanic Gardens Conservation International (BGCI) from the ICUN group, and acted as the first Director. Later, he was the scientific compiler and editor of the Global Biodiversity Assessment by UNEP in 1995 and of the three-volume series Centres of Plant Diversity, co-produced by ICUN and the World Wildlife Fund between 1994-1997. His activity continued into the 21st century, and developed to consider effects of climate change and invasive plants. The Code of Conduct on Horticulture and Invasive Alien Plants, produced by the Council of Europe in 2009 and the later European Code of Conduct for Botanic Gardens on Invasive Alien Species from the Council of Europe and BGCI in 2013 both included his input.

In 1987 he was awarded the Linnean Medal of the Linnean Society of London. Planta Europa honored him with their Linnaeus award at their fifth conference, held in 2007 in Cluj Napoca. The book Taxonomy and Plant Conservation (Cambridge University Press, 2006, Etelka Leadlay and Stephen Jury, eds.) was dedicated as a tribute to Heywood in honor of his 75th birthday.

His publications include several major books including Principles of angiosperm taxonomy (1963), Flowering Plants of the World, and its update Flowering Plant Families of the World (with Richard K. Brummitt, Alastair Culham and Ole Seberg) as well as the Global Biodiversity Assessment.

== Personal life and death ==
Heywood was initially married on 7 June 1952 to María de la Concepción Salcedo Manrique de Lara (1924-2012) "Conchita" whom he met in Cazorla, Andalusia. They had four sons, including Paul Heywood, but divorced in 1981. Vernon Heywood married the cytotaxonomist Christine Anne Brighton in 1981.

Heywood diagnosed with inoperable bowel cancer in 2020. He died at the Royal Berkshire Hospital in Reading on 17 September 2022, aged 94.

== Bibliography ==
Heyward was author or co-author of over 80 books and 400 articles. His most important books were:

- Davis, Peter Hadland; Heywood, Vernon Hilton (1963). Principles of angiosperm taxonomy. Edinburgh: Oliver & Boyd.
- Leadlay, Etelka; Jury, Stephen, eds. (2006). Taxonomy and plant conservation : the cornerstone of the conservation and the sustainable use of plants. Cambridge: Cambridge University Press. ISBN 978-0-521-84506-9.
- Flowering Plants of the World (1978)
- Heywood, V.H.; Brummitt, R.K.; Culham, A.; Seberg, O. (2007). Flowering Plant Families of the World. Kew, Richmond: Royal Botanic Gardens, Kew. ISBN 978-1842461655.
- Conservation Techniques in Botanic Gardens (Koeltz, 1990).

== Awards ==
Awards to Heywood included:

- Honorary appointments in several universities and botanic gardens including Nanjing Botanical Garden and Botanical Institute (Honorary Research Professor, 1988), Edinburgh Botanic Garden (Honorary Fellow, 1990) and University of Mendoza, 1997
- Honorary Counsellor of the Spanish Council of Scientific Research, 1972
- Gold Medal of the Linnean Society of London, 1987
- Silver Can Medal of the Island Council of Gran Canaria (1989) Silver Can Medal of the Island Council of Gran Canaria (1989)
- Hutchinson Medal of the Chicago Horticultural Society, 1990
- Gold Badge of the Canary Botanical Garden, 2002
- Gold Medal of OPTIMA, 2007
- Linnaeus Prize of Planta Europa, 2007

== Legacy ==
In addition to the organisations that Heywood founded and guided, he provided living and dried plant specimens to several national collections. Both the Royal Horticultural Society and the Royal Botanic Gardens, Kew received seeds, bulbs and corms from visits by him that they sponsored. Species introduced into horticulture in the UK that he collexted included Narcissus hedraeanthus. Herbarium specimens collected by Heywood are in the British Museum (Natural History), Royal Botanic Gardens, Kew and Royal Botanic Garden Edinburgh.

The plant genus Heywoodiella (now within Hypochaeris) was named after him.
