= Alastair Culham =

English botanist

- Born: 1965 (age 60–61); Great Waltham, Essex, England
- Known for: Contributions to plant taxonomy, particularly in regard to flowering plants
- Scientific career
- Fields: Botany; Horticulture; Biodiversity Informatics
- Author abbrev. (botany): Culham
- Alastair Culham's voice recorded October 2013

Alastair Culham (born 1965) is an English botanist. He is a member of the staff of the School of Biological Sciences at the University of Reading and Curator of the University of Reading Herbarium (RNG). He specialises in plant taxonomy, biosystematics and applications of techniques from molecular biology, phytogeography and phylogenetics. He focuses on broad-based research in biodiversity and taxonomy.

One aspect of his research concerns the effects of climate change on biodiversity. He has contributed to papers on the impacts of climate change on plant evolution as well as reviews of data source quality and computational approaches to large-scale niche modelling.

His work on the evolutionary biology of plants of interest to horticulture includes relationships within Pelargonium (a collaboration with Mary Gibby of the Royal Botanic Garden Edinburgh), evolutionary patterns within plant genera on islands, with emphasis on Echium, the phylogenetic history of Drosera and phylogenetic and taxonomic revision on Actaea and Ranunculaceae tribe Actaeae (in collaboration with James Compton), a phylogenetic evaluation of Plectranthus and Solenostemon (coleus) (in collaboration with Alan Paton from the Royal Botanic Gardens, Kew) and recently a review of Cyclamen phylogeny and classification (in collaboration with James Compton and The Cyclamen Society).

Culham is also engaged in research on the use of molecular markers for the study of genetic diversity within plant populations for the conservation of endangered species. This was applied in a project to determine the genetic diversity within Toromiro (Sophora toromiro), an endemic plant of Easter Island (in collaboration with Mike Maunder).

In fungi he has worked on development of molecular markers for identification of phytopathogenic soil fungi of the genus Fusarium with colleagues Roland Fox and Prashant Mishra of the University of California.

As of 2012 he coordinates the i4Life project, having recently completed the project that built the Catalogue of Life.

Along with Vernon Heywood, Richard Kenneth Brummitt and Ole Seberg, Culham is the author of the standard reference book, Flowering Plant Families of the World. He also sits on the editorial board of the Botanical Journal of the Linnean Society and the Science Committee of the Royal Horticultural Society.

The standard author abbreviation Culham is used to indicate this person as the author when citing a botanical name.
