= Wychavon Way =

Long-distance footpath in Worcestershire, England

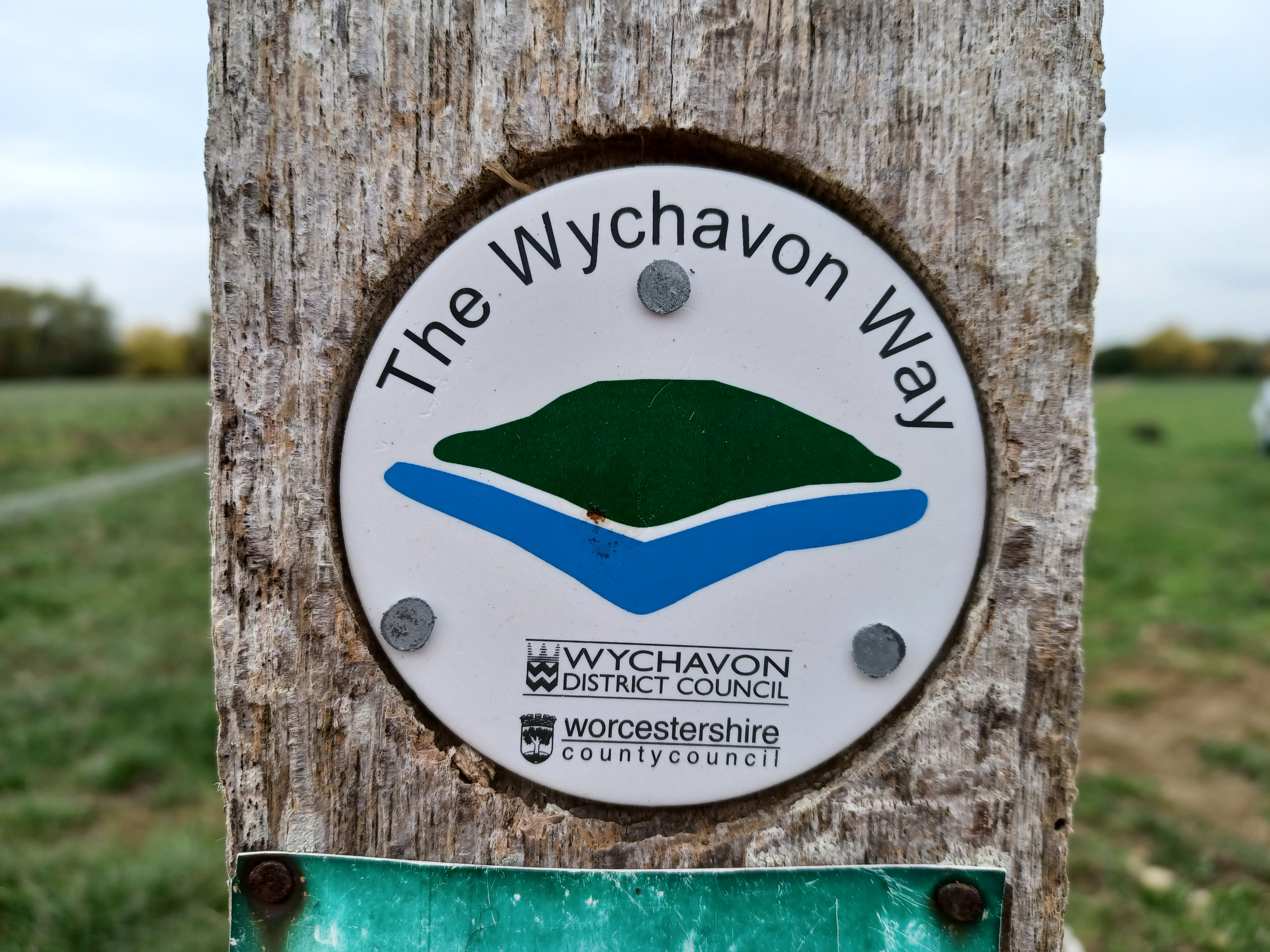
- Waymarker for the Wychavon Way.
- Length: 40 mi (64 km)
- Location: Wychavon, Worcestershire, England
- Designation: Long-distance trail
- Trailheads: Droitwich Spa; Broadway, Worcestershire
- Use: Hiking
- Elevation change: 916m total ascent
- Highest point: Bredon Hill, 299 metres (981 ft)
- Season: All year
- Waymark: Green symbol representing Bredon Hill over blue of River Avon
- Sights: Grafton Wood, The Lenches, Pershore, Bredon Hill

The Wychavon Way is a waymarked long-distance footpath in Worcestershire, England, maintained by a partnership between Wychavon District Council and Worcestershire County Council.

== Distance ==
The Wychavon Way is 40 miles (64 km) in length.

== The route ==
The route was originally opened in 1977 to commemorate the Silver Jubilee of Elizabeth II. It started from Holt Fleet on the Worcestershire stretch of the River Severn finished at Winchcombe to link with the Cotswold Way.

In Spring 2012 a new revised route was unveiled. The new route starts at Droitwich Spa and mostly follows the original route to just before Fladbury. It then deviates to include Pershore and the summit of Bredon Hill, before continuing west to finish at Broadway. The new route remains entirely within the District of Wychavon.

The original waymarks comprised a yellow three pointed crow. New waymarks have been put up to sign the new route. These contain a logo with a trebuchet on a green hill above a horizontally stretched V-shaped blue river.
