= Mike Hayes (businessman) =

English businessman

- Born: Portsmouth, England
- Occupation: Businessman

Michael Hayes is an English businessman, best known as the former president and CEO of SEGA Europe and SEGA of America (collectively SEGA West). He has also held executive positions at Codemasters and Nintendo UK and currently leads the digital and e-commerce division of Mercia Fund Management.

== Career ==
Mike Hayes was involved in the localization of StarCraft at Blizzard Entertainments in 1998. From 2002 to 2003, he was credited in various Codemasters games for a role in public relations.

During the late 1980s, Mike was employed by General Foods (soon to be bought by Kraft), where he was a Brand Manager and then Marketing Manager on their desserts products including Angel Delight and Bird's Custard. It is unknown where he was employed between then and 2001.

He joined the company in 2004 as managing director. In 2005, Hayes became president contributing to the company's reinvention from a hardware maker to a third-party games publisher. In his tenure as COO of SEGA Europe, he was credited for restoring SEGA's dominance in Europe by setting up the now-defunct Sega Racing Studio and acquiring video game studios Creative Assembly and Sports Interactive.

In June 2009, Mike Hayes replaced Simon Jeffery as President of Sega of Europe & America. He remained Sega's president until June 2012.
