= Nc'nean distillery =

Scotch whisky distillery

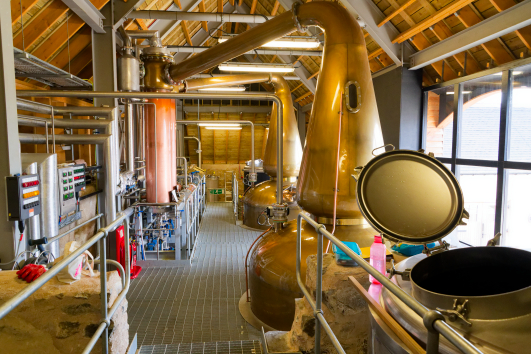

Region: Highland
- Location: Morvern, Scotland
- Coordinates: 56.5987°N 5.9654°W
- Owner: Drimnin Distillery Co
- Founded: 2017; 9 years ago
- Water source: Two nearby springs
- No. of stills: 1 wash still, 1 spirit still
- Capacity: 100,000 litres
- Website: ncnean.com

Nc'nean distillery (/nɪkˈniːən/) is a Scotch whisky distillery in Drimnin on the Morvern peninsula in the Highlands of Scotland. It was founded by Annabel Thomas and commenced production in 2017, focusing on producing an organic spirit with minimum impact on the local environment.

== History ==
The distillery was founded by Annabel Thomas and commenced production in 2017. It is based in Drimnin on the Morvern peninsula in the Highlands of Scotland. The distillery is beside the Sound of Mull, opposite the Isle of Mull. The distillery name Nc'nean, comes from "Neachneohain", a Gaelic legend which translates as the Queen of Spirits (pronounced Nick-nee-an).

Initial funding for the distillery came from family, friends, loans, seed investors under the Seed Enterprise Investment Scheme and a £600,000 grant from the EU via the Scottish Government. One known investor is Jeremy Paxman who owns a 0.6% stake. Just prior to the first distillation in 2017, the master distiller Jim Swan died suddenly. The current master distiller is Gordon Wood, who previously worked at Diageo. The whisky is unpeated.

In March 2020, the distillery raised £1.7 million of funds to allow for expansion. In August of the same year, it sold its inaugural bottle of single malt Scotch whisky at auction, raising £41,004 for charity.

Nc'nean focuses on producing an organic spirit with minimum impact on the local environment. The distillery was the first in the UK to reach net zero carbon emissions during whisky production. The distillery uses renewable electricity, offsets emissions by forest planting and uses 100% recycled glass in its bottles. In February 2022 Nc'nean became a certified B Corp and in 2024 it introduced a free postage bottle return scheme.

== Production ==
Along with a single malt whisky, the distillery also produces a botanical spirit that is unaged whisky (newmake) spirit mixed with botanicals. The botanical spirit was first released in September 2018. The first bottling of the 'quiet rebels' series was released in November 2021. It is named after founder Annabel Thomas. Nc'nean released a single cask bottling for Germany. Nc'nean Aon is four years old and was matured in an ex cream sherry hogshead with the cask number 17-257. In April 2022, Nc'nean launched another whisky series. The first bottling of the series is the "Huntress '2022'. The second bottling of the series was released in April 2023. As the second release of the Quiet Rebels series, the Nc'nean Lorna was released in September/October 2022. It is named after the distillery's first employee Lorna Davidson. With the Nc'nean Aon Cask 18-294, the distillery has released its second single cask whisky for the German market in February 2023. In fall of 2023, the third bottling of the 'Quiet Rebels' series followed with the Nc'nean Gordon. It is named after the distillery manager. The distillery released the third bottling in the Huntress series in 2024. The fifth edition followed in 2025 with the Huntress: Lemon Meadow.
