= Kemerton Conservation Trust =

Kemerton Conservation Trust is a registered charity which aims "to conserve wildlife and places of beauty in Gloucestershire, Herefordshire, Worcestershire and adjoining counties for the public benefit." Much of the Trust’s activity takes place in the area surrounding Bredon Hill in south Worcestershire, where there is a concentration of traditionally managed farmland and woodland habitats which are exceptionally rich in fauna and flora.

The Trust has four main purposes:

- managing important sites for the benefit of wildlife;
- developing innovative conservation practices;
- continuing a 25-year programme of scientific surveying, monitoring and analysis;
- educating land managers, organisations and the public about conservation priorities and practices.

Since its foundation in 1989 the Trust has employed Conservation Officers and Advisors to assist in carrying out these activities. It has received funding from the Mercia Environment Fund and the Aggregates Levy Sustainability Fund, as well as from charities, businesses and private individuals.

== Governors ==
Adrian Darby OBE (chairman), Matthew Darby, Peter Doble, Richard Knight, Lord Howick of Glendale, Prof. David Macdonald, Carl Nicholson, Dr Margaret Palmer MBE, Roger Workman.
