= Bredon Hill Hoard =

Archaeological discovery in Worcestershire, England

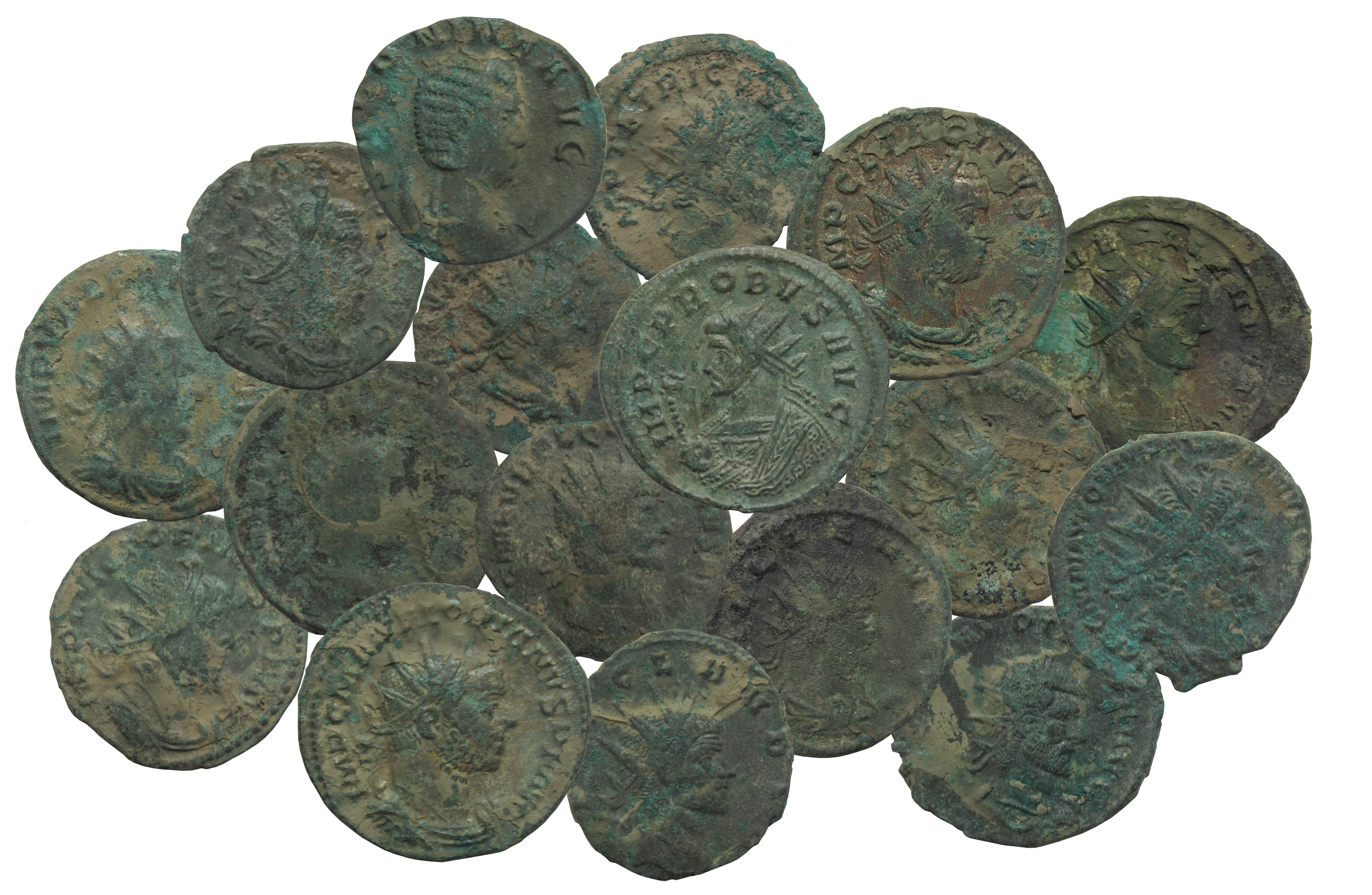
- Selection of coins from the Bredon Hill Hoard
- Material: Debased Silver
- Size: 3,784 coins
- Created: 3rd century
- Period/culture: Romano-British
- Discovered: June 2011; Bredon Hill, Worcestershire; 52.064899°N 2.063963°W
- Present location: Worcester City Art Gallery & Museum

The Bredon Hill Hoard (also known as the Bredon Hill Roman Coin Hoard) is a hoard of 3,784 debased silver Roman coins discovered in June 2011 by two metal detectorists on Bredon Hill in Worcestershire, approximately 400 metres north of Kemerton Camp, an Iron Age hill fort. The coins were found in a clay pot that had been buried around the middle of the 4th century in a Roman villa, identified by the subsequent archaeological excavation. The coins include the reigns of sixteen different emperors during the mid to late 3rd century, and are the largest hoard of Roman coins to have been discovered in Worcestershire to date.

== Discovery ==
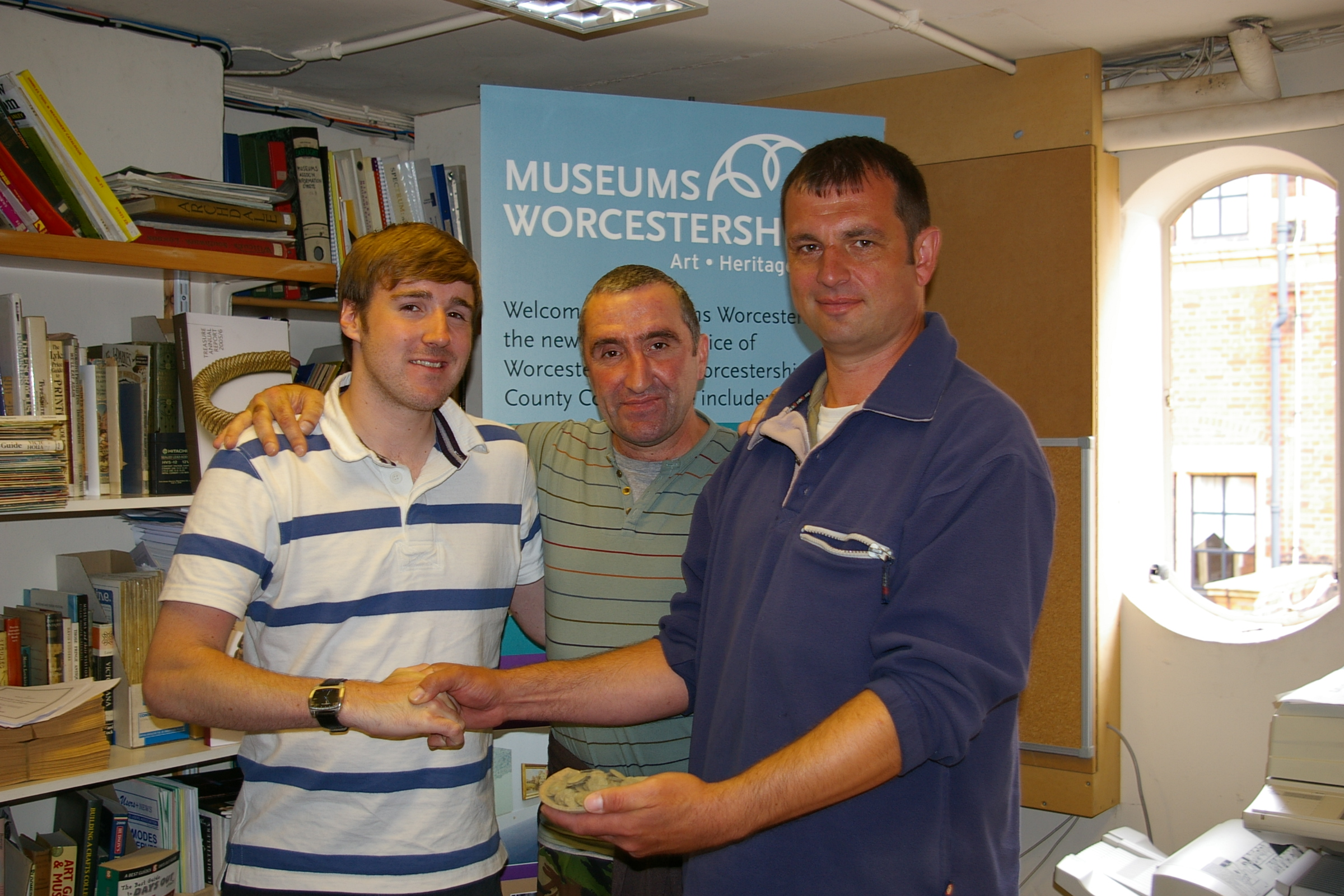
Metal detectorists Jethro Carpenter and Mark Gilmour with Richard Henry, the local Finds Liaison Officer

The hoard was discovered by metal detectorists Jethro Carpenter and Mark Gilmour from Redditch on 18 June 2011 on Bredon Hill, where they had often metal detected in the past with the permission of the landowner. After their metal detector indicated a metal object they found a nail, but they kept digging when the metal detector continued to register more metal objects, and they found several sherds of pottery, and then some coins, about 50 cm beneath the surface. Once they realised that there were a large number of coins in the ground they filled in the hole, and on the 20 June they reported the find to Richard Henry, the Portable Antiquities Scheme Finds Liaison Officer for the Worcestershire and West Midlands region.

== Excavation ==
A preliminary survey of the site was carried out by archaeologists on 21 June, and a full excavation of the find site was made at the beginning of July, for a period of two weeks. The excavation showed that the hoard had been deposited in the remains of a villa, which is unusual as most Roman hoards were buried in the open countryside, away from buildings. The archaeologists uncovered three distinct layers at the find site. The lowest level contained stone foundations for a half-timbered villa, with artefacts and coins dating to the 2nd through late 3rd centuries. The next level contained postholes for a wooden building, and included pottery datable to the 3rd or 4th century, as well as two coins that dated to the late 3rd century. The top level comprised rubble with late 4th or early 5th century pottery. The hoard was buried in a hole dug through the top level. A single coin dating to about 355–361 was found in the soil around the hoard pit, suggesting that the hoard was buried around the mid 4th century, nearly a hundred years later than the date of the latest coins in the pot.

After the coins had been removed and separated from the soil, they were dried. Then on 15 July the coins, which weighed 11 kg, were taken to the British Museum in London for conservation and identification.

== Items discovered ==
The hoard comprises 3,874 base silver radiate coins, covering the reigns of ten emperors of the central Roman Empire and the reigns of six emperors of the breakaway Gallic Empire over a range of 38 years, from 244 to 282. The coins were discovered in a clay pot of Severn Valley ware type, also dating to the 3rd century.

Table of coins
Reign	Date	Number of coins	Empire
Philippus II	247–249	1	Central Empire
Saloninus	259 or 260	2	Central Empire
Valerian I	253–260	1	Central Empire
Gallienus	260–268	433	Central Empire
Salonina (wife of Gallienus)	253–268	48	Central Empire
Claudius II	268–270	352	Central Empire
Divus Claudius	270–271	77	Central Empire
Quintillus	270	23	Central Empire
Aurelian	270–275	17	Central Empire
Tacitus	275–276	15	Central Empire
Florian	276	3	Central Empire
Probus	276–282	36	Central Empire
Postumus	260–269	67	Gallic Empire
Laelian	269	7	Gallic Empire
Marius	269	9	Gallic Empire
Victorinus	269–271	817	Gallic Empire
Divus Victorinus	271	1	Gallic Empire
Tetricus I	271–274	1,159	Gallic Empire
Tetricus II	272–274	485	Gallic Empire
Uncertain		212	
Copies		42	
Illegible		67	

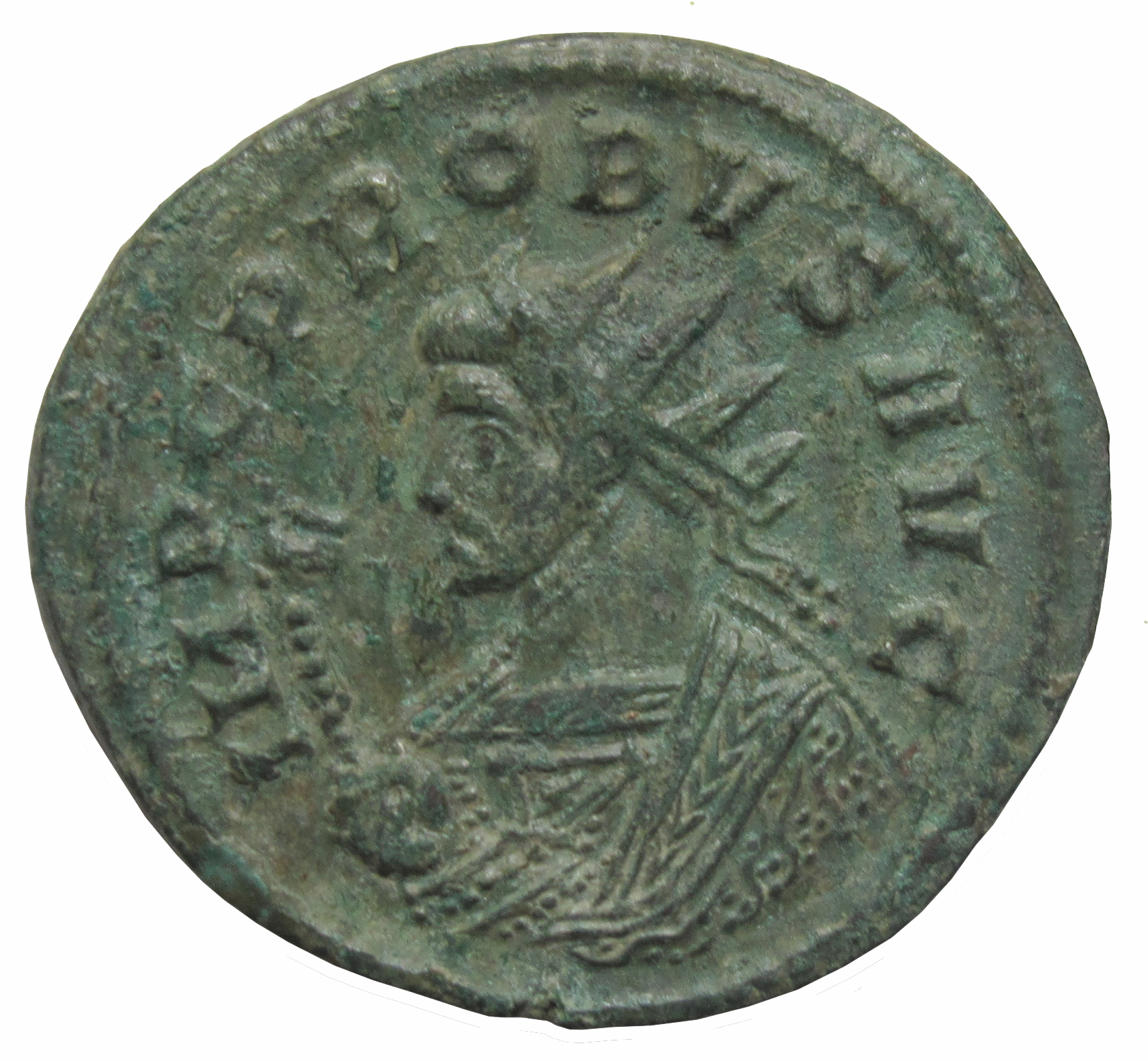
A radiate coin from the reign of Emperor Probus (276–282)

Although all the coins in the hoard are nominally silver coins, and should have about 90% silver content, most of them are severely debased, containing as little as 1% silver. Some of the coins issued after a reform of the coinage system by Aurelian in 274 are marked with the letters PXXI, and these have a slightly higher silver content, about 5% silver and 95% copper.

The coins were hand struck, and exhibit a number of errors such as mis-striking and double-striking. There are also examples where the coin has been struck using mismatched obverse and reverse dies, or where two blanks have been struck together, resulting in one coin with a blank reverse and a matching coin with a blank obverse.

== Valuation and display ==
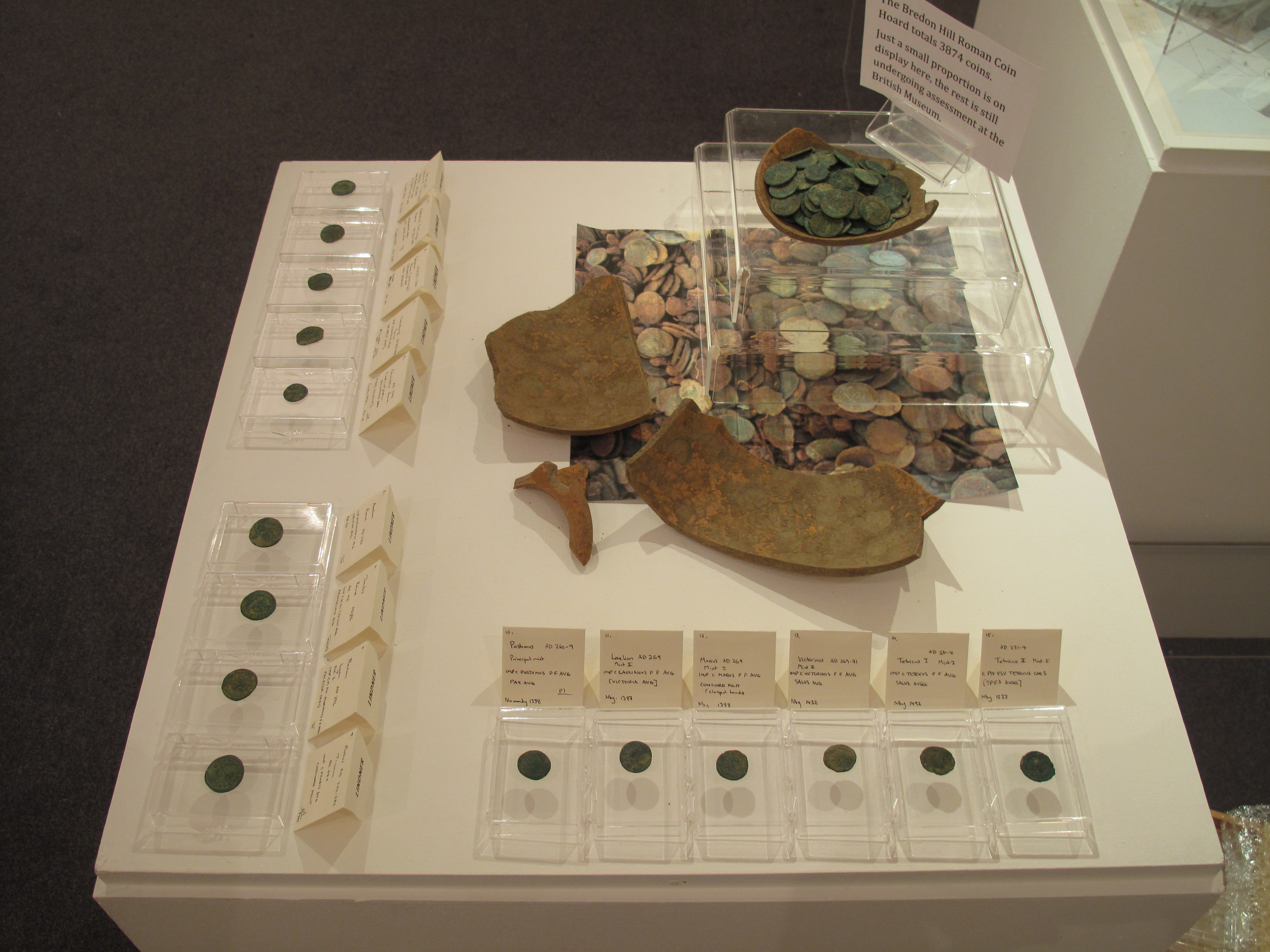
The hoard on display at the Worcester City Art Gallery & Museum

A coroner's treasure inquest was held on 16 November 2011 to determine the status of the hoard, and the coins were declared treasure, which means that they become property of the Crown. Under the terms of the 1996 Treasure Act the coins will be officially valued by the Treasure Valuation Committee, and they may then be purchased by a museum, in which case the purchase price will be shared jointly by the finders and landowner as a reward.

Worcester City Art Gallery & Museum has indicated that it wants to purchase the hoard, and has started a public appeal to raise the required money. Some of the coins from the hoard have been put on temporary display at the museum from 22 October to 26 November 2011.

== See also ==
- Frome Hoard
- List of hoards in Britain
