= Kemerton Court =

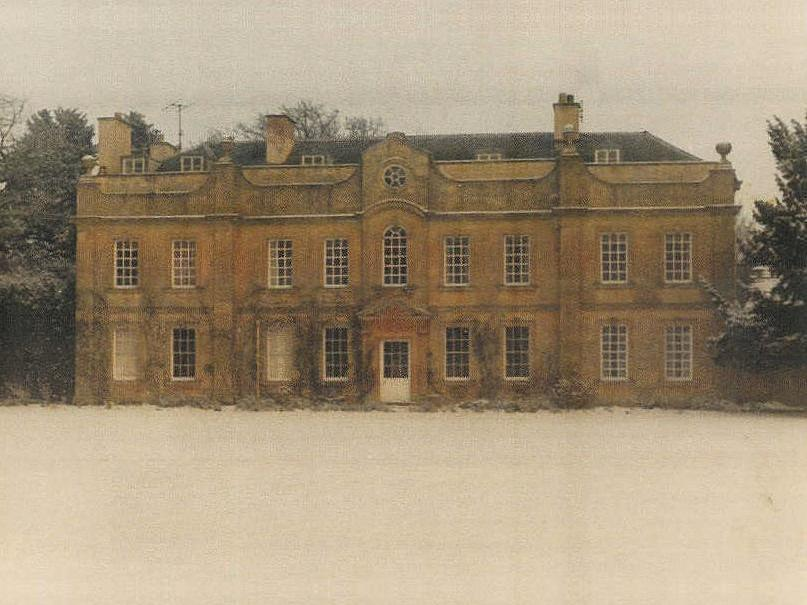
- Kemerton Court: baroque west façade
- Interactive map of the Kemerton Court area

General information
- Type: Country house
- Architectural style: English Baroque
- Location: Kemerton, Worcestershire, Tewkesbury, Gloucestershire, United Kingdom
- Coordinates: 52.028600°N 2.081800°W
- Construction started: Late 16th century
- Completed: Early 18th century
- Owner: Adrian Darby

Technical details
- Material: Cotswold stone

Listed Building – Grade II*
- Designated: 30 July 1959
- Reference no.: 1349953

Kemerton Court is the principal manor house of the village of Kemerton, near Tewkesbury in Gloucestershire.

The house is built of local Cotswold stone, dating from the late 16th century onwards. In the early 18th century a 9-bay baroque façade of some elegance was added by the squire, John Parsons III (1649–1722). Thomas White of Worcester and the Smiths of Warwick have been variously suggested as the architects. It is a Grade II* listed building.

Kemerton Court is set in parkland and is surrounded by a farming estate of around 1,300 acres (5.3 km^{2}). It is owned by conservationist Adrian Darby, president of Plantlife and former chairman of the RSPB. He is married to Lady Meriel Darby, daughter of the former Prime Minister, Alec Douglas-Home, 14th Earl of Home, who was a frequent visitor to the Court.

== History ==
The manor was granted by King Henry III to Sir Robert de Musgrove (or Mucegros) in 1240. Since that time, apart from the brief period 1918–1949, it has remained in the possession of his descendants and relatives, passing through the families of Musgrove, Beauchamp, Lygon of Madresfield, Parsons-Hopton and Darby. The current owner is 24th in direct descent from Sir Robert de Musgrove. A notable 15th-century owner was John Beauchamp, 1st Baron Beauchamp of Powick, Lord High Treasurer of England.
