= Fred Archer (writer) =

English writer

Fred Archer (30 April 1915 – 25 September 1999) was an English farmer and author.

Archer's literary career began following a talk he gave to his local Guild, as a replacement speaker. Having written and read out a humorous story, he was encouraged by the response of his audience. Archer's first book, The Distant Scene, was published in 1967, 'Under the Parish Lantern' followed in 1969. In the following three decades, he went on to publish books at the rate of almost one a year, describing the rural England he knew, and the characters within.

== Bibliography ==
- The Secrets of Bredon Hill: A Country Chronicle of the Year 1900 (1971).
