= Amphibian and Reptile Conservation Trust =

British charitable organization

- Formation: 2009; 17 years ago
- Registration no.: 1130188
- Legal status: Charity
- Purpose: Amphibian and reptile conservation
- Website: www.arc-trust.org

Amphibian and Reptile Conservation (ARC) is a British wildlife charity formed in July 2009 by the Herpetological Conservation Trust. It supports the conservation of frogs, toads, newts, snakes and lizards, and the habitats on which they depend.

Amphibian and Reptile Conservation has around 30 members of staff working across the UK and owns, leases or formally manages over 80 reserves covering more than 1500 ha (3800 acres) and a variety of different habitats, from coastal dunes to clay pits, woodland to heathland.

As well as being one of the UK's leading managers of lowland dry heathland, ARC carries out a variety of national and regional projects and campaigns working with hundreds of volunteers and many professional partners.
