= Cambering =

Geological phenomenon of rock strata

Cambering is a phenomenon typically seen at a valley crest or plateau margin whereby blocks of competent strata such as sandstone stretch, tilt or rotate with respect to underlying incompetent rock layers such as clay or mudstone. It results from the weaker underlying strata deforming under the weight of the strata above it. Cambering is associated with valley bulging and the development of gulls on the upper slopes.

Valley bulging is the development of an anticlinal structure in the underlying weaker strata, the long axis of which is broadly coincident with the orientation of the valley. Valley bulging was first described in England within the upper Derwent catchment in Derbyshire and is also encountered within the Cotswolds.

Gulls are fractures in competent strata that typically form parallel to a valley side in association with cambering. They occur on a range of scales with widths from millimetres to tens of metres. The gulls may be voids open to the sky or they may be partially or wholly filled with unconsolidated material such as earth or brecciated rock. Multiple gulls and areas of cambering occur in the Cotswolds where for example the limestones of the Inferior Oolite overlie relatively weak Liassic mudstones.

The development of one or more of this suite of features has been linked to the rapid incision of a valley through competent strata into less competent strata below particularly in periglacial conditions. Recognition of these features is important for engineering geologists advising developers of physical infrastructure such as roads, bridges and dams in such areas.
