= Matthew Darby =

British conservationist

Matthew George Darby (born 27 August 1967) is a British conservationist and former publisher. He is the son of Adrian Darby and Lady Meriel Darby, daughter of former British Prime Minister, Sir Alec Douglas-Home (also known as 14th Earl of Home, and Lord Home of the Hirsel). Home's correspondence with Darby was published as Letters to a Grandson in 1983.

Darby was the co-creator of the Pocket Canons, a best-selling series of books from the bible published in sixteen countries. The series won a number of awards including the Design and Art Direction (D&AD) Silver Award, 1998 and the Publishers' Publicity Circle award for Generic Campaign of the Year, 1998.

Darby is married to singer-songwriter Christina Kulukundis and has two children.
