= Planta Europa =

Network of organisations working to conserve European wild plants and fungi

Planta Europa is a network of independent organisations, non-governmental and governmental, working together to conserve European wild plants and fungi. It brings together more than 70 member organisations from 37 European countries.

The Planta Europa Network was established in 1995 as a result of a conference discussing pan-European cooperation for plant conservation. Since then, Planta Europa has held a conference every three years (1998 in Sweden, 2001 in the Czech Republic, 2004 in Spain, 2007 in Romania, 2011 in Poland, 2014 in Greece and 2017 in Ukraine). The next conference is due to be held in Hungary in June 2025. At these conferences, botanists and plant conservationists from countries across Europe gather to discuss the directions and joint goals for plant conservation.

At the 2007 PE Conference in Romania, members of Planta Europa worked together towards producing a new European Plant Conservation Strategy, which was published as European Strategy for Plant Conservation 2008-2014 in 2008.

The secretariat for Planta Europa is based in The Hague, The Netherlands (see Planta Europa website).
