= Enterprise Investment Scheme =

1994 British series of tax reliefs

The Enterprise Investment Scheme (EIS) is a series of UK tax reliefs launched in 1994 in succession to the Business Expansion Scheme. It is designed to encourage investments in small unquoted companies carrying on a qualifying trade in the United Kingdom.

By the end of the 2014–15 tax year, a cumulative total of £14.2 billion had been invested under the scheme into approximately 25,000 companies. In that year, in excess of £1.8 billion was invested under the EIS.

== Purpose ==
Investment in companies that are not listed on a stock exchange often carries a high risk of loss of capital, and low market liquidity means that it may be difficult or time consuming to sell or realise the investment. The tax reliefs available under the EIS are intended to offer investors some incentive to counterweigh those risks.

=== Provision of tax relief ===
The EIS offers several different kinds of tax relief, available both to direct investors and investors through a managed EIS fund or portfolio service. They are conditional upon the company receiving investment being a qualifying company under the scheme. A brief summary of the tax benefits is as follows:

- 30% up front income tax relief, which can be carried back to the previous tax year. The maximum subscription is currently £1,000,000 per investor per year (this rises to £2,000,000 per year if the companies are deemed 'knowledge intensive'), yielding a potential reduction in tax liability of £300,000 per annum (assuming the investor has sufficient income tax liability).
- Capital gains tax (CGT) deferral – an investor can defer capital gains realised on a different asset, where disposal of that asset was less than 12 months before the EIS investment or less than 36 months after it. This relief is limited to the amount being invested into the EIS and can be claimed by investors whose interest in the company does not exceed 30%. It is available to individuals and trustees. Where gains arise on the EIS investment, taper relief is available.
- No CGT to pay on any gains made when the investment is realised after three years (five years for investments made before 6 April 2000), provided the EIS initial income tax relief was given and not withdrawn on those shares.
- Tax relief from investment losses – if EIS shares are disposed of at any time at a loss, such loss can be set against the investor's capital gains or income in the year of disposal, potentially limiting a total loss to 38.5% of an investor's capital
- EIS shares do not form part of the estate for inheritance tax purposes, provided the investments have been held for at least two years at time of death and the company qualifies for business property relief (BPR).

== Qualifying companies and individuals ==
The rules for qualifying are complicated; for example, the following are some of the qualifications that must be met:

=== The company ===
- The company must not have gross assets greater than £30 million immediately before the share issue, or £35 million immediately afterwards.
- The company may have no more than 250 full-time equivalent employees
- All capital employed must be actively engaged in the company within 24 months
- The investment must be completed within seven years of the first commercial sale of the company.
- The company must not be in specific industries such as coal and steel production, farming, leasing, financial services and property development.
- Entry into the scheme is subject to a decision and audit made by an appointed tax officer
- The company must not be listed or have any intention of becoming listed at the time of the investment
- The company must not have already received more than £24 million in total (or £10 million in any 12-month period) from the following sources: EIS, SEIS, Venture Capital Trusts, social investment tax relief, or state aid under the risk finance guidelines.

=== The individual ===
- The investor may not have more than a 30% interest in the company
- No partner or associate of the investor (including spouse, relations, prior business contacts) may have other interests in the company
- The investor must not have any form of preferential shares
- The investor must not have any other form of controlling interest in the company
- The scheme must not be used for the purposes of avoiding tax

== Seed Enterprise Investment Scheme ==
On 6 April 2012, the Seed Enterprise Investment Scheme (SEIS) was launched, with the goal to "stimulate entrepreneurship and kick start the economy."
