= Seed Enterprise Investment Scheme =

The Seed Enterprise Investment Scheme (SEIS) was launched by the United Kingdom government on 6 April 2012 in order to encourage investors to finance startups by providing tax breaks for backing projects they may otherwise view as too risky. SEIS acts as an incentive to encourage investors to invest as the tax relief can allow individual investors to reduce their effective income tax liability, for the year in which they make the investment, to zero.

== Examples ==
Some of the funding for the establishment of the Nc’nean distillery in Scotland was from SEIS.
