= The Miniaturist (TV series) =

2017 British TV series

- Anya Taylor-Joy in the BBC series poster
- Genre: Drama; Supernatural; Historical
- Based on: The Miniaturist by Jessie Burton
- Written by: John Brownlow
- Directed by: Guillem Morales
- Starring: Anya Taylor-Joy; Romola Garai; Alex Hassell; Hayley Squires; Paapa Essiedu
- Music by: Dan Jones
- Country of origin: United Kingdom
- Original language: English
- No. of series: 1
- No. of episodes: 2 (BBC); 3 (PBS)

Production
- Producer: Gethin Scourfield
- Cinematography: Gavin Finney
- Running time: 157 minutes
- Production companies: BBC; PBS Masterpiece; The Forge

Original release
- Network: BBC One
- Release: 26 December – 27 December 2017

The Miniaturist is a 2017 BBC television two-part adaptation of the debut novel of the same name by Jessie Burton. The series was directed by Guillem Morales and stars Anya Taylor-Joy, Romola Garai and Alex Hassell and first aired in two parts from 26–27 December 2017 on BBC One. In the United States, it aired in three parts from 9–27 September 2018 on PBS's Masterpiece.

== Plot ==
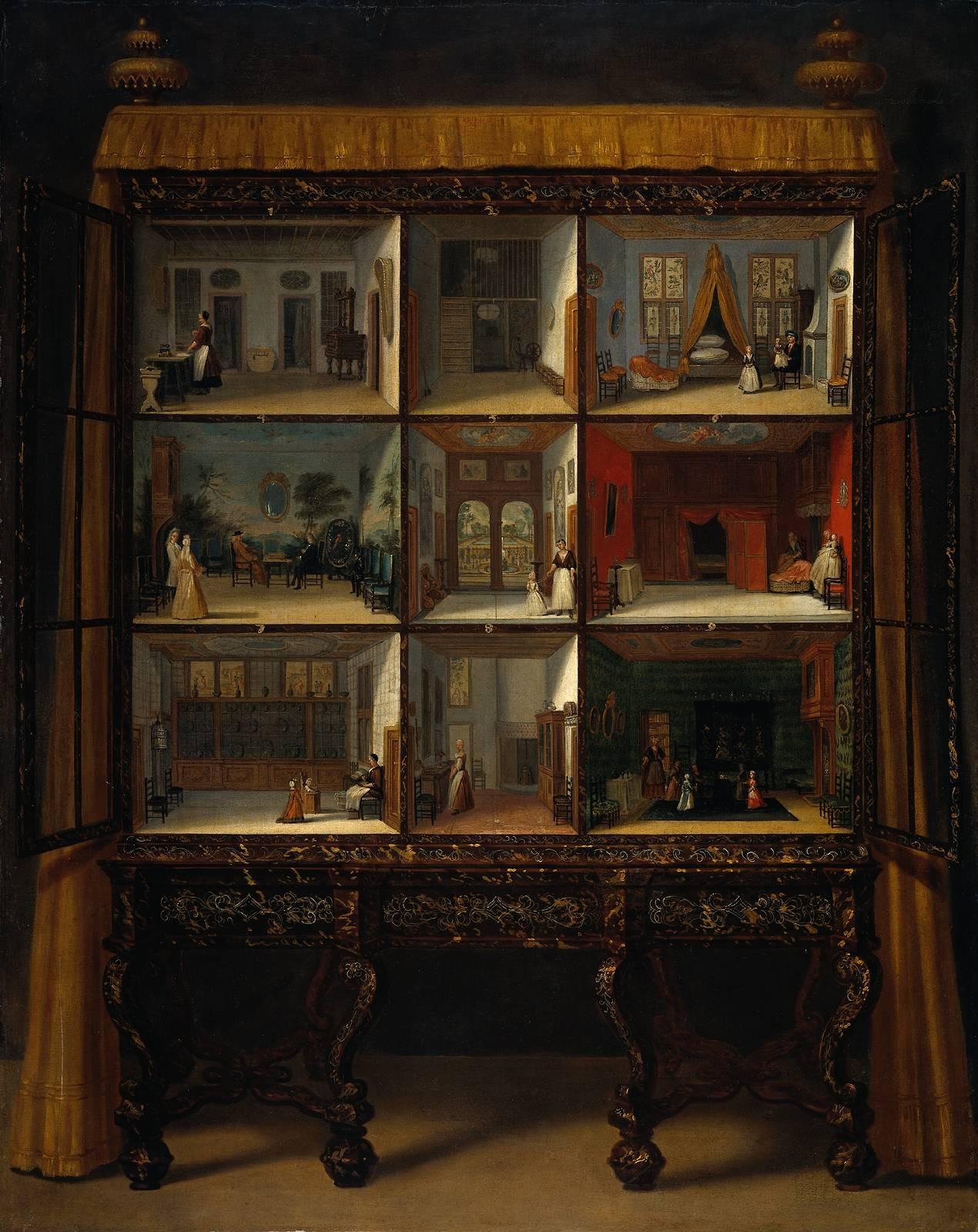
The Dutch Golden Age collector Petronella Oortman’s cabinet dollhouse, depicted in a painting by Jacob Appel (1710), Rijksmuseum

In the 17th-century Netherlands, young country girl Petronella "Nella" Oortman, the female protagonist, moves into the house along one of Amsterdam’s exclusive canals of her new husband Johannes Brandt. She had agreed to marry a rich and powerful man in order to pay off her family’s debts. The Brandt family is of the wealthy Dutch merchant class. Also living in the very wealthy house are his pious sister, Marin, and their two servants Cornelia and Otto, the black African Johannes had bought out of slavery when he was an adolescent.

Nella receives a cold, passive-aggressive reception from Marin. When Marin shows to her new bedroom, which overlooks the gracht, she says, “This used to be my room, but it had the better view, so he gave it to you.” Nella wants her to take it back. “You misunderstand,” says Marin. “The view is of you. Amsterdam must see that Johannes Brandt has a wife.” Johannes' reception is indifferent, but he is a kind, handsome and charming gentleman. He provides her with expensive, colourful dresses and an extravagant bridal gift: a dollhouse cabinet with nine rooms.

Nella writes to a miniaturist to order three exquisite miniatures for her dollhouse, and with time she receives multiple of them, without having ordered them, to decorate the dollhouse. Nella is surprised that each parcel includes a mysterious note as she receives the items and the dolls of her house members predicting something, making it similar to the household they live in.

Johannes has an merchant agreement to sell sugar for Frans Meermans. However, Johannes is discovered to be in a long-time same-sex relationship with Jack Philips, a secret which Marin had tried to hide so he could not be punished to death by the officials. Jack tries to attack Marin, but is wounded by Otto. Frans files a complaint claiming that Johannes attempted to murder Jack and forced Jack to be in this relationship, also accusing Johannes of bribery. Johannes tries to escape on a ship but is arrested and imprisoned, so the judges decide his fate.

Meanwhile, pregnant Marin tells Nella she was in love with Frans before he married Agnes. Marin herself has declined Frans' proposal. Marin wanted to remain Domina in the Brandt household, not submit to a husband and lose her freedom. Frans became negative toward Johannes, thinking Johannes forbade Marin to marry him. Marin passes away after a painful delivery. The baby is Otto's daughter. Nella tries to sell the sugar to a confectioner and small storekeeper who is Cornelia's friend, and she bribes the priest in the church so she can bury Marin. Johannes is sentenced to death by drowning on the charge of being a sodomite.

Nella finds out that the Miniaturist is a woman trying to follow her but vanished when Nella tries to follow back. Nella asks her how could she tell by making dolls what would happen in the Brandt family, but the Miniaturist has no answer for her questions.

== Cast and characters ==
- Anya Taylor-Joy as Petronella "Nella" Brandt:
  She is married to Johannes, in return for the clearance of debts that her family was liable for after her father's death.
- Romola Garai as Marin Brandt:
  She is Johannes's sister, who holds the power in the Brandt household despite Nella's arrival.
- Alex Hassell as Johannes Brandt:
  He is a merchant who sells sugar. His marriage to Nella is to cover his secrets. Nella observes he frequently leaves their house instead of spending time with her.
- Hayley Squires as Cornelia, Johannes's servant.
- Paapa Essiedu as Otto:
  He is Johannes's servant who has an illicit relationship with Marin.
- Emily Berrington as The Miniaturist
- Geoffrey Streatfeild as Frans Meermans:
  He is an up-and-coming businessman, and an "old" friend of Johannes whose friendship ends when his ex-fiance Marin declines to marry him.
- Aislín McGuckin as Agnes Meermans:
  She is Frans's wife who has invested money in sugar.

In addition, Ziggy Heath plays the character of Jack Philips, who indulges in a same-sex relationship with Johannes, which is a punishable crime. Christopher Godwin plays the character of Pastor Pellicorne, a religious leader in Amsterdam, and Ian Hogg plays the character of Pieter Slabbaert, who is a schout of Amsterdam.

== Episodes ==
No.	Episode	Directed by	Written by	Original release date	UK or US viewers (millions)
1	Episode 1 (US, UK are different)	Guillem Morales	John Brownlow	26 December 2017 UK / 9 September 2018 US	N/A
2	Episode 2 (US, UK are different)	Guillem Morales	John Brownlow	27 December 2017 UK / 16 September 2018 US	N/A
3	Episode 3 (USA only)	Guillem Morales	John Brownlow	23 September 2018 US	N/A

== Production ==
The series was filmed on location in the Netherlands, with Leiden standing in for 17th-century Amsterdam.

== Reception ==
On the review aggregator website Rotten Tomatoes, 76% of 17 critics' reviews are positive, with an average rating of 6.5/10. The website's consensus reads: "Handsome set pieces and exceptional performances help make The Miniaturist engaging enough, even if its version of events doesn't quite measure up to its mysterious source material." Metacritic, which uses a weighted average, assigned the film a score of 69 out of 100, based on 7 critics, indicating "generally favorable" reviews.

Caroline Framke for Variety praised the beauty of the series, but criticised it as overly long. "It's a shame that the series never quite gels, given how much it has going for it in terms of story, talent, and the truly spectacular production design and costuming that sets off the on location shoots with such style. But just like the dollhouse at its center, The Miniaturist is better at housing facsimiles rather than characters that feel real.

Hanh Nguyen of IndieWire, who graded the series a B, criticised the series for weak character development — which made it seem as though "an episode has gone missing" — but that the series was still worth watching. "Despite Amsterdam thriving during this time, the series examines life in that society from the point of view of the misfits and marginalized. Defiance and bravery are necessary to face the ugliness that is presented, and it's a theme echoed in the characters' actions. The Miniaturist may feel raw and green, sometimes naively so, but in its awkward, otherworldly way champions hope and change, and that's rarely a waste of time."
