= Now Sleeps the Crimson Petal =

Sonnet by Alfred, Lord Tennyson

- by Alfred Tennyson
- First published in: The Princess: A Medley
- Country: England
- Language: English
- Publication date: 1847
- Lines: 14

Full text
- Now Sleeps the Crimson Petal at Wikisource

"Now Sleeps the Crimson Petal" is a poem written by Alfred Tennyson. It is like a sonnet in having fourteen iambic lines, but it is not rhymed (except that the word "me" is repeated at the ends of key lines), and it does not follow either the Shakespearean or Petrarchan organization. It was first published in 1847, in The Princess: A Medley.

The poem has been set to music several times, including settings by Benjamin Britten, Roger Quilter, Ned Rorem, Mychael Danna, Harry Burleigh and Paul Mealor. It also appeared as a song in the 2004 film Vanity Fair (based on Thackeray's novel from 1848), sung by the character Becky Sharp.

Writer and poet Oscar Wilde included a reference to Tennyson's poem in the last paragraph of his essay "The Decay of Lying": "The final revelation is that Lying, the telling of beautiful untrue things, is the proper aim of Art. But of this I think I have spoken at sufficient length. And now let us go out on the terrace, where 'droops the milk-white peacock [56/57] like a ghost', while the evening star 'washes the dusk with silver'. At twilight nature becomes a wonderfully suggestive effect, and is not without loveliness, though perhaps its chief use is to illustrate quotations from the poets. Come! We have talked long enough."

Michel Faber adapted the first line of Tennyson's poem for his novel set in Victorian London, The Crimson Petal and the White, published in 2002.

== Poem ==
- The full text of Now Sleeps the Crimson Petal at Wikisource
