= The Crimson Petal and the White =

Book by Michel Faber

- First UK edition
- Author: Michel Faber
- Publisher: Canongate (UK); Harcourt (US)
- Publication date: 2002
- Pages: 864
- ISBN: 978-1-84195-323-6
- OCLC: 315627914

The Crimson Petal and the White is a 2002 novel by Michel Faber set in Victorian England.

The title is from an 1847 poem by Alfred, Lord Tennyson entitled "Now Sleeps the Crimson Petal", the opening line of which is "Now sleeps the crimson petal, now the white." The novel is told from the perspective of all of the main characters, and the omniscient narrator occasionally addresses the reader directly. It has a meta-literary aspect, as Sugar is working on her own novel, Henry writes sermons, and Agnes keeps a diary.

== Publication history ==
The first draft was written in 1980 using a typewriter, but Faber set the manuscript aside feeling it was too dark. Over two decades later, Faber revisited his draft. After getting some story revisions and a more hopeful ending, the novel was published (by Canongate) in hardback in the UK in 2002, with a paperback edition following the next year. Canongate also published The Apple, a selection of short stories based on characters from The Crimson Petal and the White, in 2006.

== Plot ==
The novel details the lives of two very opposite Victorian women, Agnes and Sugar, who revolve on the linchpin of William Rackham. He is the unwilling and somewhat bumbling heir to a perfume business, with moderate success and little self-awareness.

He marries the exquisitely doll-like Agnes, even though he barely knew her. Agnes, the consummate Victorian "female ideal" of naive and delicate femininity, has been kept completely in the dark on sexual matters. Her diaries express utter confusion over events like menstruation (which she believes is a demon who returns periodically to "bleed" her), pregnancy, sex, or childbirth: she does not even acknowledge her young daughter, Sophie, whom the household staff carefully keeps away from Agnes. Everyone treats Agnes as a mentally ill patient, and she is kept drugged and confined to her bedroom. Weekly visits from Dr. Curlew, who Agnes believes sexually assaults her during his "examinations" of her, keep her unbalanced. Outside of the house, few know of Agnes's madness (though knowledge of it spreads during the length of the story), as she generally presents herself as an inveterate hostess and socialite to the world during each season.

William soon becomes obsessed with a worldly young prostitute named Sugar, an unconventionally intelligent and strong-willed young woman who uses the affair with William to climb to a higher perch in the rigidly stratified class system of the time. William purchases Sugar from her madame (Sugar's own mother) and sets her up in a luxurious flat of her own, where he regularly visits her on his terms. Sugar has been a prostitute since the age of 13 and views sex as a living, not a pleasure, with no physical act too taboo. She is resentful of her reliance on William (and men in general) and indulges her fantasies about harming her and her fellow prostitute's clients in an explicitly gruesome novel of revenge erotica that she pens in her spare time as she works to maintain William's continued interest using both her body and her mind.

As William's fortunes climb with the help of Sugar's excellent business acumen, Agnes becomes increasingly eccentric (which the reader learns is due to a brain tumor but which those around her believe to be hysteria). William eventually moves Sugar into his household, hidden as a member of his staff. Sugar is designated as Sophie's governess and grows to genuinely love the girl as her own. All the while, Agnes's mind begins to spiral into hallucinations of angels, and William retreats to the man's world of his business dealings. Agnes catches sight of Sugar around the property and becomes convinced that Sugar is her angel come to take her to the Convent of Health.

The book culminates in William losing everything after having long neglected the needs of the two women. The day before Agnes is to be moved to an asylum on the orders of William, Sugar suggests to Agnes that she run away in search of the Convent of Health. This convinces Agnes that Sugar is indeed her angel, and Agnes runs off. A body is later found in the river Thames; William believes the body is Agnes, but Sugar has reason to believe it is not. After Agnes's supposed death, it is implied that William is considering courting another woman of his station rather than marrying Sugar. After Sugar discovers that she has become pregnant by William, she plans to end the pregnancy by falling down the stairs of the house. After going through with the plan, Dr. Curlew examines Sugar and discovers the pregnancy, reporting it to William. William dismisses Sugar from the household in a letter. Sugar, having grown fond of Sophie, takes Sophie with her when she leaves. The end, though left unclear, implies that William never finds Sophie, Sugar, or Agnes.

Other characters include Henry Rackham—William's pious older brother who obsessively wants but struggles to become a clergyman—and Emmeline Fox—Dr. Curlew's widowed daughter who works in the Rescue Society, which tries to reform prostitutes.

== Reception ==
Kathryn Hughes reviewed the book in The Guardian, calling it "supremely literary" and describing the quality of the writing as "dizzyingly accomplished".

== In other media ==
In 2010, the BBC announced the production of a four-part drama based on the novel; viewing started in April 2011. The adaptation's cast includes Romola Garai, Chris O'Dowd, Gillian Anderson, Richard E. Grant, Shirley Henderson, Amanda Hale, Mark Gatiss, Tom Georgeson and Liz White; it was adapted by Lucinda Coxon and directed by Marc Munden. The director of photography was Lol Crawley.
