= The Courage Consort =

2002 novel by Michel Faber

- First edition cover art
- Author: Michel Faber
- Genre: Fiction
- Publisher: Canongate Books
- Publication date: 2002
- Publication place: United Kingdom
- Media type: Print
- Pages: 121
- ISBN: 1-84-195226-5

The Courage Consort is a 2002 psychological fiction novella by Michel Faber.

== Summary ==
A five member a capella vocal group rehearse an avant-garde piece, spending two weeks together in an isolated Belgian château.

== Plot ==
The Courage Consort of the title is an a cappella vocal group named after its leader, Roger Courage, a baritone. The narrator of the novel is Roger's wife Catherine, a soprano in the ensemble. The other members are Dagmar (contralto), Ben (bass) and Julian (tenor). In order to prepare for a performance of the avant-garde composition "Partitum Mutante", they gather for two weeks in an isolated château in Belgium.

Widely differing personalities within the group lead to considerable tensions especially given the difficulty of the piece being rehearsed. Roger is vain, whilst Julian has a barely containable libido. Dagmar, with baby son in tow, is cuttingly frank and critical, whilst Ben is passive and physically lumbering.

The whole episode is seen essentially from Catherine's perspective, which is one of a depressive who has recently stopped taking her medication, seemingly without good reason. Her erratic behaviour, including an earlier suicide attempt, is tolerated by the rest of the group, though clearly causes embarrassment to Roger. Whilst at the chateau she becomes troubled by apparent animal-like screams from the surrounding forest at night. She does form supportive relationships with Ben, to some extent, and particularly with Dagmar, who encourages her to take bicycle rides together. Nevertheless her condition worsens to the extent that she wanders off into forest overnight though her return in a disheveled condition the next morning hardly causes concern.

Visits to the chateau by various outsiders such as the cleaner, the composer and the director of the festival at which the piece is to be performed, only serve to exacerbate difficulties in the rehearsals.

The sudden death of Ben, presumably due to a heart attack, brings the whole rehearsal enterprise to a sudden halt. Whilst Roger clings to a hope of continuing nearly normally, Catherine emerging in a more stable mental condition, asserts herself to oppose him and in so doing brings the group to an appropriately performative finale.

== Themes ==
The story explores the impact of the intense pressure of performing and living together as a small group, exacerbated by personalities and relationships which are already fragile.

== Reception ==
Whilst reviewers noted that Faber's inventiveness here was dialled down compared to his previous novel Under the Skin, The Courage Consort was generally well received. The Guardian stated that "his air of strange novelty is as fresh as ever". New York added that "the lurid everywhere darkens the mundane". New York Times compared it to a ghost story where a "haunting tale develops through accretion of ordinary but ominous details".
