= The Hundred and Ninety-Nine Steps =

2001 novel by Michel Faber

- First edition cover art
- Author: Michel Faber
- Genre: Thriller
- Publisher: Canongate Books
- Publication date: 2001
- Publication place: United Kingdom
- Media type: Print
- Pages: 116
- ISBN: 1-84-195199-4

The Hundred and Ninety-Nine Steps is a 2001 murder mystery novella by Michel Faber.

== Summary ==
A twentieth century conservator working on an archaeological dig whilst struggling with physical and mental trauma, unwittingly uncovers the truth behind an unexplained historical death.

== Plot ==
Siân, a paper conservator, suffers from recurring nightmares of her own death. Earlier in her life a serious accident had resulted in the loss of part of her leg. She joins an archaeological excavation at Whitby Abbey in North Yorkshire as a means to distract herself from her physical and mental struggles. While climbing the famous one hundred and ninety-nine steps leading to the abbey ruins, she meets Magnus, a medical student, and immediately bonds with his dead father’s dog, Hadrian.

Magnus shows Siân an 18th-century manuscript sealed inside a bottle, which his father had unearthed during some demolition work. She persuades him to let her examine it given her conservation expertise. With painstaking efforts and considerable mental anguish, she reveals that it contains a confession that initially appears to implicate a father with the murder of his own daughter. As Siân's conditions worsen, the character of her attitude towards Magnus swings dramatically, alternately romantic and antagonistic. On deciphering the final part of the confession, she reveals that the girl had actually taken her own life and the father's actions were taken to keep this fact secret. Suicide at that time was considered a crime and a sin.

A recovering Siân meets Magnus a final time following her discharge from hospital. Magnus must imminently leave Whitby for London to complete his qualifications and when Siân agrees to take ownership of Hadrian the dog, they part on cordial yet still ambiguous terms.

== Themes ==
The story combines elements of both historical mystery and modern day romance.

== Background ==
In the Acknowledgements section, the author explains that the origin of the book lies in an invitation by the Artist-in-Residence at Whitby Abbey to visit and write a short story inspired by an English Heritage archaeological dig.

== Reception ==
The Guardian notes that "Faber's novella defies definition and as a result is a little formless." New York finds the relationship between the two main protagonists "frustrate every expectation all the way up to the slightly pat ending". The New York Times is more positive in calling this one of Faber's "eerily beautiful tales".
