= Glorious 39 =

- Theatrical release poster
- Directed by: Stephen Poliakoff
- Written by: Stephen Poliakoff
- Produced by: Barney Reisz; Martin Pope
- Starring: Romola Garai; Bill Nighy; Julie Christie; Eddie Redmayne; David Tennant; Christopher Lee
- Cinematography: Danny Cohen
- Edited by: Jason Krasucki
- Music by: Adrian Johnston
- Production companies: BBC Films; Magic Light Pictures; Quickfire Films; Screen East Content Investment Fund; Talkback Thames; UK Film Council
- Distributed by: Momentum Pictures
- Release dates: 27 October 2009 (London Film Festival); 20 November 2009
- Running time: 129 minutes
- Country: United Kingdom
- Language: English
- Budget: £3.7 million

Glorious 39 is a 2009 British war thriller film written and directed by Stephen Poliakoff, starring Romola Garai, Bill Nighy, Julie Christie, Jeremy Northam, Christopher Lee, David Tennant, Jenny Agutter, Eddie Redmayne and Charlie Cox. The film was released on 20 November 2009.

On the eve of the Second World War, as the formidable Keyes family tries to uphold its traditional way of life, daughter Anne sees her life dramatically unravel when she stumbles upon secret recordings of the appeasement movement.

== Plot ==
In present-day London, Michael Walton visits his older cousins, Walter and Oliver Page. Interested in family history, he asks them about his great-aunt, Anne Keyes, the sister of his grandmother, Celia. Anne, an actress, was the eldest of the three Keyes children. Desperate for children, her father, Sir Alexander, a Member of Parliament and mother, Maud, had adopted her. Maud subsequently gave birth to Ralph and Celia. Michael is curious to learn what happened to Anne, which leads Walter to reminisce about the summer of 1939 at the Keyes' estate in Norfolk.

On Sir Alexander's birthday, Anne has prepared a table in the garden to celebrate. Anne's friend, the outspoken MP Hector and her lover, the reserved Lawrence, are present for the festivities. When Sir Alexander arrives, he brings a guest, the quiet government employee Joseph Balcombe. During dinner, Hector rants about Britain's lack of action against Nazi Germany. It is later revealed that he has been one of those calling out for a new prime minister. The next day, while looking for a cat in one of the property's sheds, which are out of bounds as they are used for storing Sir Alexander's private papers, Anne finds gramophone records, labelled "Foxtrot". They prove to contain recorded meetings and telephone conversations. Sir Alexander reveals that he has allowed Balcombe to store government documents in the shed.

Two weeks later, Anne is notified that Hector has been found dead from an apparent suicide. Anne wonders if Balcombe had anything to do with Hector's death. Sir Alexander brushes off the idea but offers to ask Balcombe to remove the records from the shed, which he promises to do the next day during a picnic. There, the picnickers go for a walk, leaving Anne to watch over the baby Oliver. She awakens to find Oliver and his pushchair missing. She follows his cries to no avail and she comes across young Walter and accuses him of playing a game. When the family returns, they search. Balcombe insists on searching with Anne through the lane even though she has already searched there, but they find him in his pushchair on a lane. Anne denies moving the baby, but the incident plants a seed of doubt about Anne's word.

Balcombe removes the records that night, but Anne secretly keeps two of them. The family returns to London because Parliament has been recalled. There, Anne listens to the records. One contains a recording of a distressed Hector pleading with Balcombe to cease calling him and his parents about his personal life. The maid bursts into the room, which causes the gramophone to fall and the record to break into pieces. On 1 September, Anne gives a second record to her fellow actor and friend, Gilbert, who closely follows politics. The next day, he arrives to their scene late and clearly upset, and the director insists that they begin shooting immediately. The news that Britain has declared war on Germany is announced, and Gilbert is later found dead from apparent suicide. When Anne watches her final scene with Gilbert, she is stunned to realise that a supposed flub in which he changes his line from, "You should listen to me, Jenny" to "You should listen to it again, Anne" was really meant for her.

Anne travels back to Norfolk to keep Aunt Elizabeth company, and she listens to the second recording again. At the end, she recognises Balcombe's voice discussing their plots to pressure and silence men like Hector. Suddenly she hears the voice of her brother, Ralph, who suggests the name "Thin Man Dancing" for their covert operation, a reference to a childhood toy. At a party in London, Anne tells Lawrence of Ralph's involvement, but he already knows. Lawrence convinces Anne to bring him the recording at a rendezvous at a suburban veterinary surgery. After Anne finds Lawrence's body in a shed filled with euthanised pets, she escapes and gives the recording to a child, who promises to post it to Churchill. She is subsequently recaptured, drugged by her father, and held prisoner in Aunt Elizabeth's house, which is close to St Paul's Cathedral. Balcombe pays her a visit and shows her the second recording, which he had intercepted. He tells her that it had been made for her father. He also informs her that their house in London is being used for series of pro-appeasement meetings that her father is chairing.

Sir Alexander later admits to her that he believes that Britain will be destroyed unless it secures an early peace with Germany. He says that she is the only member of the family that does not share his beliefs and so they are keeping her secure. They deprive her of water and leave her to die, but after some time, Maud releases her while the rest of the family is at the park. Anne goes past them, and when they act as if nothing happened, she runs away.

Back in the present, Walter tells Michael that Anne had died in Canada twenty years ago and that he had just been doing what his family and Balcombe had wanted. It is then revealed that Balcombe had convinced Walter to move Oliver's pushchair into the lane. Michael asks Oliver and Walter to accompany him to meet his mother. They travel to the same park that Anne had last seen her family. A woman, Michael's mother, wheels an elderly woman towards them. That elderly woman is Anne, and Michael tells them that he knew the truth all along but wanted to hear it from them.

== Cast ==
- Romola Garai as Anne Keyes, an actress and eldest Keyes child. Ralph refers to her as "Glorious".
- Bill Nighy as Sir Alexander, Anne's father, Member of Parliament and First World War veteran.
- Julie Christie as Elizabeth, Anne's aunt.
- David Tennant as Hector, a family friend and Member of Parliament
- Christopher Lee as Walter Page
- Sam Kubrick-Finney as young Walter Page
- Eddie Redmayne as Ralph, Anne's brother
- Juno Temple as Celia, Anne's sister
- Jenny Agutter as Maud, Anne's mother
- Hugh Bonneville as Gilbert Williams, an actor friend of Anne
- Charlie Cox as Lawrence, Anne's lover
- Corin Redgrave as Oliver Page
- Jeremy Northam as Joseph Balcombe, a shady government operative
- Toby Regbo as Michael Walton, Anne's grandnephew
- Muriel Pavlow as Old Anne Keyes

== Production ==
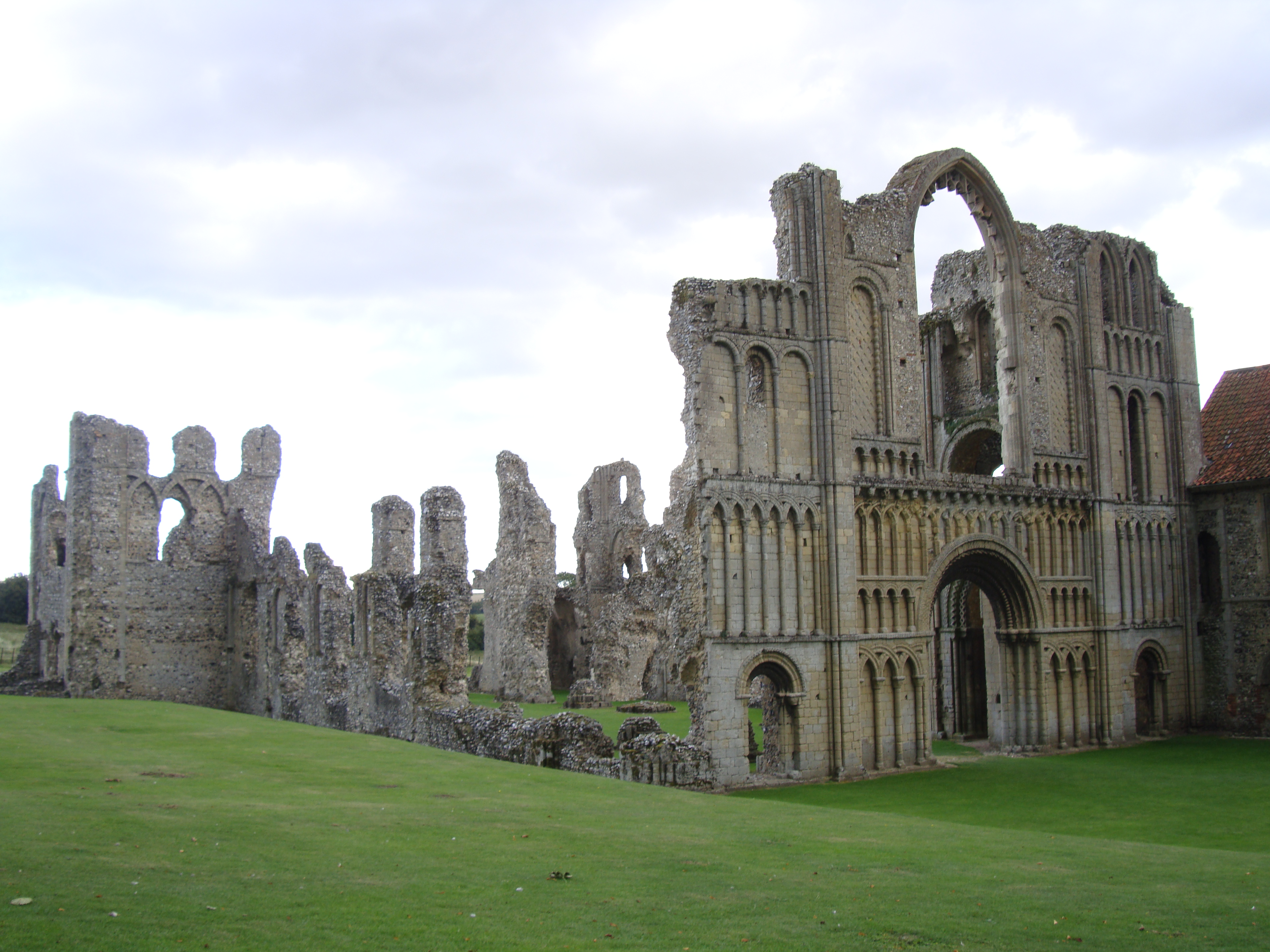
Castle Acre Priory

Much of the filming took place in Norfolk, where the film is set. Filming began in late October 2008 and concluded in December 2008. The ruins of Castle Acre Priory and Walsingham Priory feature prominently as favourite haunts of the Keyes siblings. Other locations include the Cley Marshes, Holkham Hall and Houghton Hall.

== Reviews ==
- The Guardian: "Stephen Poliakoff's pre-second world war conspiracy thriller never zips the way it should, but it's still a solid, old-school entertainment."
