= The Factory Theatre Company =

Theatre company based in the United Kingdom

The Factory Theatre Company is a theatre company based in the United Kingdom.

== History ==
The Factory's first production, William Shakespeare's Hamlet, was first performed at various pop-up locations across London, the first of these being a studio theatre in Southwark, and others included City Hall and County Hall. Each cast member was able to play multiple parts, and the only "props" used were objects brought by the audience (which once included a baby). According to The Guardian, this production won The Factory a "cult following".

The Factory's production of The Seagull was first performed at the Hampstead Theatre in London in April 2009, directed by Tim Carroll. Similarly to their production of Hamlet, the cast was made up of multiple actors capable of playing different roles, and the only "props" used were objects brought by the audience. Unlike their production of Hamlet, the story of the novel was performed without script, with the cast instead learning the story's "units of action" to shape the performance around; thus the actors, script and props were all different for each performance. The performance was lauded as "as unforgettable and moving as any theatre I've seen" by The Guardian's Hermione Hoby.

In March 2012, The Factory staged their production of Hamlet, together with Creation Theatre Company, at the original Blackwell's bookshop in Oxford. From March to April of the same year, The Factory and Creation Theatre then staged another co-production, a new translation of Homer's Odyssey.

In August to September 2014, The Factory staged their production of the Odyssey in Peckham. This production was directed by Tim Caroll.

The Factory also staged a production of Shakespeare's Macbeth.

== Members ==
The Factory was co-founded by actors Alex Hassell and Tim Evans. Hassell is currently the sole artistic director. The Factory's patrons include Academy Award-winning actress Emma Thompson and Golden Globe Award-winning actor Ewan McGregor.
