= The Miniaturist =

2014 novel by Jessie Burton

- First edition (UK) with quotation from S. J. Watson
- Author: Jessie Burton
- Audio read by: Davina Porter
- Cover artist: Katie Tooke; Andersen M Studio
- Language: English
- Genre: Historical fiction
- Set in: Amsterdam, 1680s
- Publisher: Ecco (US); Picador (UK)
- Publication date: 3 July 2014 (US); 26 August 2014 (UK)
- Publication place: United Kingdom
- Media type: Print, ebook, audiobook
- Pages: 400 pp
- ISBN: 9781447250890 (1st ed. UK hardcover)
- OCLC: 1016814502

The Miniaturist is the 2014 debut novel of English actor and author Jessie Burton. An international bestseller, it was the focus of a publishers' bidding war at the 2013 London Book Fair. Set in Amsterdam in 1686–87, the novel was inspired by Petronella Oortman's doll's house on display at the Rijksmuseum. It does not otherwise attempt to be a biographical novel. A sequel, The House of Fortune, was published in 2022.

== Synopsis ==
It is 1686 in the Netherlands. Nella (Petronella) Oortman is eighteen, living in a small town. Her late father squandered the family's wealth and she makes an arranged marriage to Johannes Brandt, who is thirty-nine, a rich, respected Amsterdam merchant. The simple ceremony is in her home town, and Johannes returns to Amsterdam the same day; the marriage is not consummated.

A month later, as arranged, Nella goes to his house in Amsterdam to join him. He is not there when she arrives, but she meets the other members of the household. Marin is his severe, unmarried sister. Cornelia is the maid, a little older than Nella, more spirited than maids in the countryside. Otto, Johannes' servant and business assistant, aged about thirty, is, to Nella's astonishment, a black African. Johannes had bought Otto out of slavery when he was an adolescent.

Life becomes difficult for Nella, and there are things she does not understand: tension between Johannes and Marin; sounds of movement at night. It is a house where people listen outside doors and peep through keyholes. Nella spies in Marin's room, and finds an unsigned love-note sent to her. Johannes is usually out or abroad; he rejects Nella's caresses. But he gives her a marvellous present: a cabinet house, an eerie replica of the house they live in. She is given generous funds with which to buy more items for the house, and she orders some from a miniaturist. The order is delivered by Jack Philips, a beautiful young man from England, whom Johannes seems to know.

One day Nella, trying to get closer to her husband, makes a surprise visit to his office. She discovers him receiving oral sex from Jack. Marin admits that she knew of this and arranged the marriage because a wife protects them. The punishment for sodomy is death by drowning. Later, while Johannes is abroad, Jack delivers another packet from the miniaturist. In the fracas that ensues, he stabs one of Johannes' beloved dogs to death and, in a scuffle with Otto, is stabbed with his own dagger. Though the injury is not serious, Otto, afraid of the legal consequences, flees the country.

At present, Johannes is handling an important business affair, the sale of a large stock of sugar belonging to Frans and Agnes Meermans. As young men, Johannes and Frans were equals, working in the Treasury. Frans was in love with Marin, but his marriage proposal was rejected. This was Marin's free decision, but Frans believes that Johannes forbade the marriage. Johannes has now excelled him in status and wealth, and the sale is financially important to the Meermans. It is also important to Johannes whose wealth has, it seems, lessened, but it seems he is not giving it his full attention. The Meermans go the warehouse where their sugar is stored to check on it – and come across Johannes having sex with a man against the warehouse wall. The man is Jack; he claims he was forced to submit. Frans makes a report to the authorities. Johannes is arrested, tried, and sentenced to death.

For several months, Marin has been concealing that she is pregnant. When the time comes, she refuses to have a midwife, so that the birth can be kept secret. Nella and Cornelia attend her, often not knowing what to do. The birth is extremely painful and Marin dies soon afterwards. Nella assumed the father was Frans, but it is clear that the colored baby is Otto's daughter. Three days after Marin dies, Johannes is executed. Otto returns, to see his child. Nella has sold the sugar to a confectioner whose wife is a lifelong friend of Cornelia's. A new phase of life begins in the house.

Throughout all of these events, Nella interacts with a mysterious miniaturist, ordering items for her dollhouse. At first, the miniaturist sends Nella the items she has ordered, works of exquisite craftsmanship, but soon begins to send items not ordered, or not yet. Parcels are found on the doorstep in the morning, including notes with small fortunes or sayings. She sends, inexplicably, a cradle. Other things show an intimate, uncanny knowledge of the house and its occupants. For example, the figure of Marin shows that her austere clothes are fur-lined, a secret Cornelia has told Nella. Later, the belly of the figure has the curve of pregnancy. Nella discovers that the miniaturist is a woman, whom she sees watching her intensely in public places, but vanishes when she tries to approach her. She wonders, "Are these pieces echoes or presages – or, quite simply, a lucky guess?" Later, she thinks, "I have been watched and guarded, taught and taunted ... I thought she was stealing my life, but in truth she opened its compartments and let me look inside." She discovers that the miniaturist has a similar place in the lives of other women, but the true nature of her power is a mystery.

== History ==
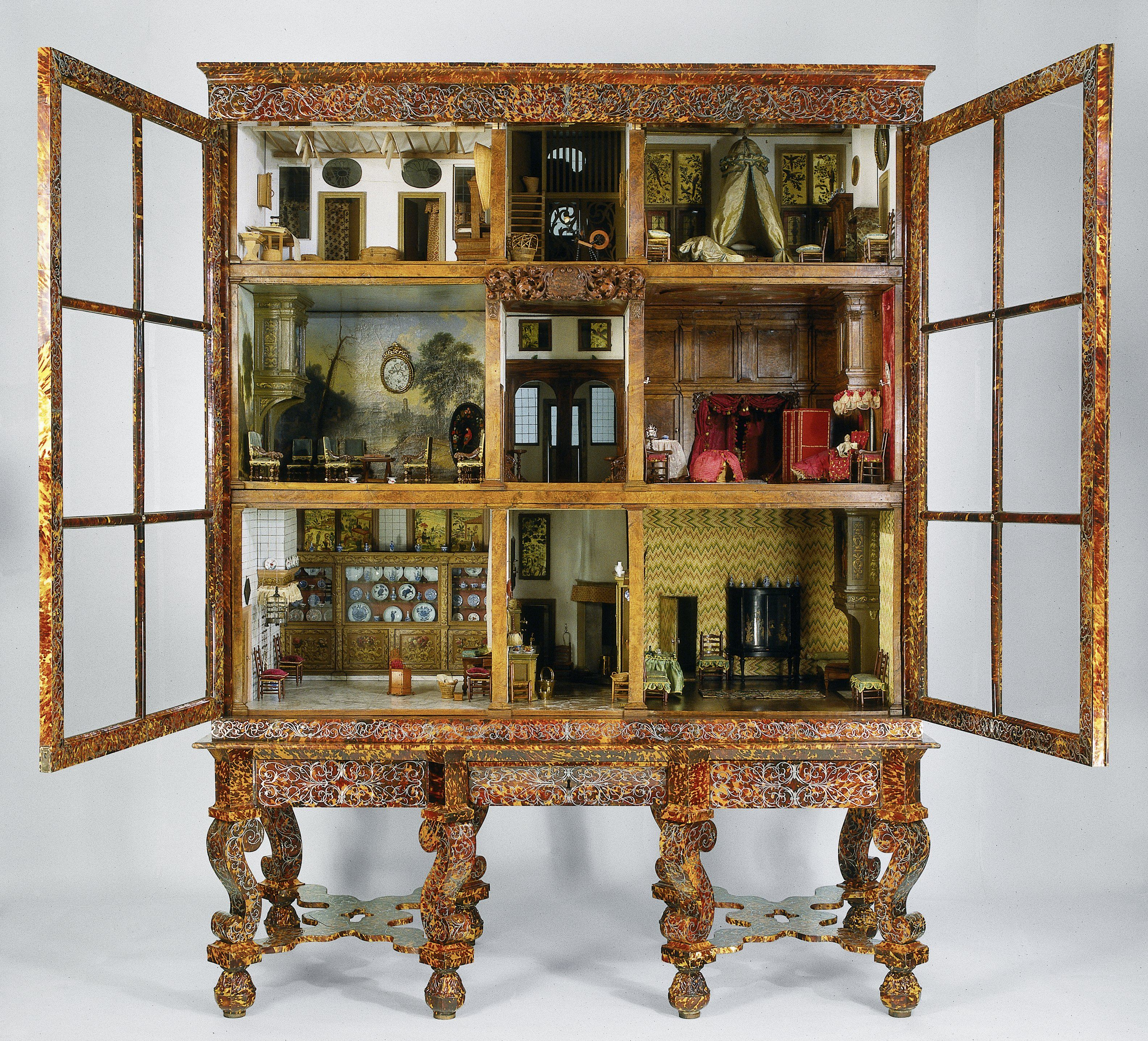
Petronella Oortman's elaborate dollhouse that inspired the novel, permanent collection of the Rijksmuseum in Amsterdam

Burton, who had studied English literature at the University of Oxford before embarking on an acting career, wrote the novel over a period of four years while supporting herself as an actress and Personal assistant in the City of London. She came up with the idea while on holiday in Amsterdam, where she viewed Petronella Oortman's doll house at the Rijksmuseum, and undertook extensive research on 17th-century Amsterdam, studying books, cookbooks, Dutch Golden Age paintings, maps, and wills. She trimmed the word count from 120,000 words to 80,000 words after participating in a creative writing course in 2011 and to better match the marketing target readership.

The novel was the focus of a publishers' bidding war at the 2013 London Book Fair. Of the 11 publishers that vied for the book, Picador won the UK and British Commonwealth rights for a reported six-figure sum.

The UK cover design is a photograph of an actual miniature doll's house commissioned by Picador, which reflects characters and elements in the novel.

== Publication history ==
By 2016, the book had sold over 1 million copies in 37 countries.

== Reception ==
The Guardian and Chicago Tribune reviews observe that Nella is drawn more like a worldly, feminist 21st-century girl than a naïve 17th-century one. The Chicago Tribune adds: "[The main characters are] complex and complicated and suffer terrible tragedies, but Burton doesn't give us a deep enough look into their psyches. I'd read 100 additional pages just to get inside Johannes' head".

== Awards and honours ==
- 2014 Specsavers National Book Awards: Book of the Year
- 2014 Specsavers National Book Awards: New Writer of the Year
- 2014 Waterstones Book of the Year winner

In 2015 the novel also received a nomination for the Desmond Elliott Prize.

== Adaptations ==
BBC One debuted a two-part, 2.5-hour television adaptation of the novel in the UK on 26 December 2017. The adaptation was written by John Brownlow, directed by Guillem Morales, and produced by The Forge in conjunction with the BBC and Masterpiece. The series was filmed on location Leiden in the Netherlands and the United Kingdom. It starred Anya Taylor-Joy as Nella, Romola Garai as Marin, Emily Berrington as The Miniaturist, and Alex Hassell as Johannes. Episode 1 was seen by 4.52 million viewers and Episode 2 by 4.31 million viewers.

== See also ==
- Girl with a Pearl Earring by Tracy Chevalier, an historical novel based in 17th-century Delft.
