= The Crimson Petal and the White (2011 serial) =

2011 short television series based on the Michel Faber novel

- Genre: Drama
- Based on: The Crimson Petal and the White by Michel Faber
- Screenplay by: Lucinda Coxon
- Directed by: Marc Munden
- Starring: Romola Garai; Chris O'Dowd
- Theme music composer: Cristobal Tapia de Veer
- Countries of origin: United Kingdom/ Canada
- Original language: English
- No. of episodes: 4

Production
- Cinematography: Lol Crawley
- Editor: Luke Dunkley
- Production companies: Origin Pictures; Cité-Amérique

Original release
- Network: BBC Two
- Release: 6 April – 27 April 2011

The Crimson Petal and the White is a 2011 four part television serial, adapted from Michel Faber's 2002 novel The Crimson Petal and the White. Starring Romola Garai as Sugar and Chris O'Dowd as William Rackham, the drama aired in the UK during April 2011 on BBC Two. The supporting cast includes Shirley Henderson, Richard E. Grant and Gillian Anderson. Critical reviews of the drama were mixed but generally positive.

== Plot ==
In Victorian London, William Rackham is the heir to a perfume business and has a mentally ill wife, Agnes, who is confined to her home. Despite his dreams to become a renowned writer, he has no talent for it, and his father decides to cut his allowance until William starts working seriously in the company. William meets and becomes infatuated with a young and intelligent prostitute named Sugar, who is writing a novel of her own, filled with hatred and revenge against all the men who abused her and her colleagues. William moves Sugar into a flat of her own on the condition that she sees him exclusively, while she helps him emotionally and financially by giving good advice on how to handle the company. Sugar becomes more and more attached to William and, as she comments to one of her old friends, "the world that comes with him". Eventually he moves her into the Rackham household under the pretence of working as a governess to his young daughter Sophie, the daughter Agnes has never acknowledged the existence of due to her madness. Agnes becomes increasingly unstable and desperate and, having caught glimpses of Sugar, believes her to be her own guardian angel who will bring her to the imaginary Convent of Health.

With time Sugar grows close to Sophie, becoming the mother she never had, and Agnes, by reading her journals, slowly comprehending her plight and so coming to feel a need to help her. Agnes' irrational behaviour risks her being incarcerated in an asylum and the night before she is taken and William is away, Sugar helps Agnes to escape. Later on a body is found that William identifies as Agnes (he recognises only her hair, not knowing that Agnes had cut her hair before escaping). William and Sugar's relationship grows distant, with William treating Sugar more and more like a servant and adviser rather than a lover. Sugar becomes pregnant, but realising that William no longer wants her, induces a miscarriage. William begins to court another woman, despite telling Sugar things would get better, and when he discovers Sugar's pregnancy (not knowing she has already miscarried), he coldly tells her to leave.

Enraged by the betrayal, Sugar gathers Sophie's belongings and runs away with her. While running away, Sugar loses her manuscript and buys a new notebook to start a new story and a new life with Sophie. Meanwhile, William discovers what Sugar has done and tries to catch up with them, but after being mocked by Sugar's old friends he realises he has lost everything.

== Cast ==
- Romola Garai as Sugar
- Chris O'Dowd as William Rackham
- Amanda Hale as Mrs. Agnes Rackham
- Shirley Henderson as Mrs. Emmeline Fox
- Mark Gatiss as Henry Rackham Junior
- Katie Lyons as Clara
- Eleanor Yates as Letty
- Elizabeth Berrington as Lady Constance Bridgelow
- Richard E. Grant as Doctor Curlew
- Clare Louise Connolly as Janey
- Isla Watt as Sophie Rackham
- Tom Georgeson as Henry Rackham Senior
- Liz White as Caroline
- Branwell Donaghey as Cheesman
- Blake Ritson as Bodley
- Bertie Carvel as Ashwell
- Sarah Jane O'Neill as Factory worker
- Gillian Anderson as Mrs. Castaway

== Film locations ==
The production visited Kent, where they filmed at The Historic Dockyard Chatham and Eastgate House in Rochester. The scenes set in Chepstow Villas were filmed in Canning Street, Liverpool.

== Reception ==
In a review of the first episode for The Independent, Tom Sutcliffe described the opening scenes as a "bad laudanum dream" and said "it looks fabulous". Writing for The Daily Telegraph, Michael Deacon compared the drama negatively to its source material. He found that the "limitations of television" had had a detrimental effect on the story, criticising the "demure" sex scenes, faster pace, and the inability of television as a medium to get into the characters' minds. Also writing for The Daily Telegraph, John Preston gave the series a mixed review. He was critical of the production as chaotic and unfocused, and noted "a certain flabbiness" and lack of character development. However, he praised the actors, particularly Chris O'Dowd, and Gillian Anderson.

In another article for The Daily Telegraph, Benji Wilson gave the series a positive review, saying "it was certainly bold, experimental and it worked". He was particularly complimentary about the "look" created by director Marc Munden and cinematographer Lol Crawley. He described Cristobal Tapia de Veer's soundtrack as "bizarre and contrary" and went on to say "[de Veer] set out to subvert – he welded the squelchings and rumblings of modern electronica to a tableau from the 1870s in the way that Radiohead's Jonny Greenwood did in his score for There Will Be Blood." Writing for The Observer, Andrew Anthony was enthusiastic about the drama, calling the acting "richly subtle" and the cinematography "intoxicatingly woozy". He praised Romola Garai and said that Chris O'Dowd's performance was "a revelation". The Guardian's Sarah Dempster described the atmosphere as "woozy, gauzy [and] brilliantly claustrophobic"; a result, she said, of Munden's "exceptional, stylish, unselfconscious direction" and de Veer's score. Rachel Cooke in the New Statesman called the series "a compelling thing: vivid, nasty and rank with the stench of hypocrisy". She praised the director and actors, especially Gillian Anderson ("so sly, so convincing"). In a blog post for The Guardian, novelist Michel Faber described the experience of watching the adaptation of his story. He was pleased with the result and credited screenwriter Lucinda Coxon for placing "parental nurture or the lack of it" at the centre of the story. in an interview for The List, he said "They’ve been very clever. I think they’ve done an extraordinary job with it."

=== Awards and nominations ===
Year	Award	Category	Recipients and nominees	Result
2011	Royal Television Society Craft & Design Awards	Best Costume Design	Annie Symons	Won
2011	Royal Television Society Craft & Design Awards	Best Make-Up Design	Jacqueline Fowler	Won
2011	Royal Television Society Craft & Design Awards	Best Production Design	Grant Montgomery	Won
2012	BAFTA Television Awards	Best Actress	Romola Garai	Nominated
2012	BAFTA Television Awards	Best Mini-Series	The Crimson Petal and the White	Nominated
2012	Broadcasting Press Guild TV Awards	Best Actress	Gillian Anderson	Nominated
2012	Broadcasting Press Guild TV Awards	Best Actress	Romola Garai	Nominated
2012	Irish Film & Television Awards	Best Television Actor	Chris O'Dowd	Nominated
2012	Royal Television Society Awards	Best Drama Serial	The Crimson Petal and the White	Nominated
2013	Critics' Choice Television Award	Best Movie or Mini-Series	The Crimson Petal and the White	Nominated
