= Romola Garai =

British actress

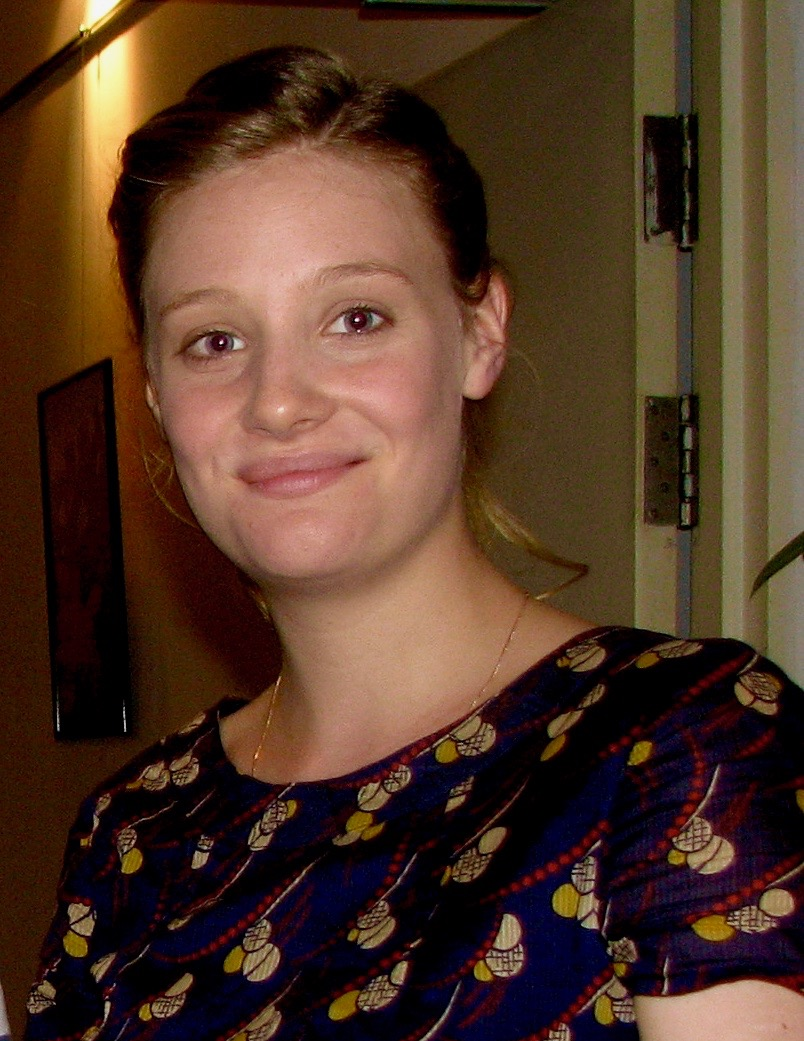
- Garai in July 2007 in Singapore
- Born: Romola Sadie Garai; 6 August 1982 (age 44); British Hong Kong
- Education: City of London School for Girls; Open University (BA)
- Occupations: Actress, film director, screenwriter
- Years active: 2000–present
- Known for: Inside I'm Dancing; Atonement; Amazing Grace; The Years
- Spouse: Sam Hoare (m. 2014)
- Children: 2
- Awards: Laurence Olivier Award for Best Actress in a Supporting Role

Romola Sadie Garai (/ˈrɒmələ ˈɡæri/ ROM-ə-lə GARR-ee; born 6 August 1982) is a British actress and filmmaker. Known for her extensive work on stage and screen, she often acts in period films. Her early film roles include Nicholas Nickleby (2002), I Capture the Castle (2003), Inside I'm Dancing (2004), and Dirty Dancing: Havana Nights (2004). She has gained prominence for her performances in critically acclaimed costume dramas such as Vanity Fair (2004), As You Like It (2006), Amazing Grace (2007), Atonement (2007), Glorious 39 (2009), and Suffragette (2015).

She is known for her portrayal of Emma Woodhouse in the BBC series Emma (2009), for which she received a nomination for the Golden Globe Award for Best Actress – Miniseries or Television Film. She received a nomination for the British Academy Television Award for Best Actress for the BBC Two series The Crimson Petal and the White (2011). From 2011 to 2012, she played Bel Rowley in the BBC series The Hour receiving Golden Globe Award and Critics' Choice Television Award nominations. In 2022, she portrayed Mary Tudor in Becoming Elizabeth.

== Early life and education ==
Romola Sadie Garai was born on 6 August 1982 in Hong Kong to British parents, the third of four siblings. Her father's family is Hungarian Jewish. Her mother, Janet A. (née Brown), raised Garai and her three siblings, while her father, Adrian Earl Rutherford Garai, was a bank manager. Garai's great-grandfather, Bernhard "Bert" Garai, emigrated from Budapest to New York in the 1910s with his English-born wife before moving to London. He was the founder and manager of the Keystone Press Agency, a photographic agency and archive. His employers, Press Illustrating Company, merged with Keystone View Company in 1924. Most of Garai's Jewish relatives were murdered during the Holocaust in Hungary.

Her family moved to Singapore when she was five and returned to Wiltshire, England, when she was eight. She attended Stonar School, an independent boarding school in Wiltshire, and moved to London at 16 to attend the City of London School for Girls, where she completed her A-levels. She appeared in school plays and was a member of the National Youth Theatre until she was 18, when she was cast as the younger version of Judi Dench's character in the BBC Films/HBO television co-production The Last of the Blonde Bombshells.

After completing her A-levels, she studied English literature at Queen Mary University of London before transferring to the Open University, where she graduated with a first-class degree. She had originally intended to focus on her studies but began acting full-time during the summer holiday.

== Acting career ==
=== 2000–2009 ===
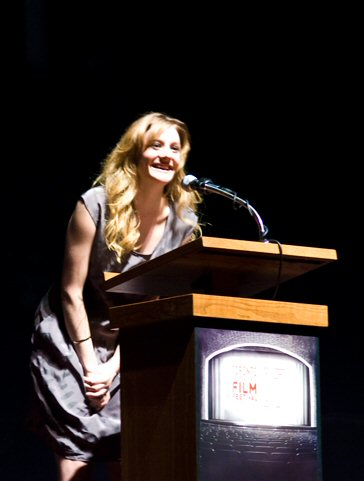
Garai at the 2007 Toronto International Film Festival

Garai's first professional acting role was in the 2000 BBC-HBO TV film The Last of the Blonde Bombshells, where she played Judi Dench's character as a young woman. She then appeared in the BBC television series Attachments (2000–2002).

Her first major film role was in Nicholas Nickleby. She played Kate Nickleby, a supporting role, in the well-reviewed film. The cast were awarded Best Ensemble by the National Board of Review. In 2003's I Capture the Castle, she played 17-year-old Cassandra Mortmain. Her performance earned her a nomination for a Most Promising Newcomer award from the British Independent Film Awards.

Her performance in Dirty Dancing: Havana Nights (2004) received mixed reviews. Later in 2004 Vanity Fair was released, in which she played Amelia Sedley. Co-starring Reese Witherspoon, Jim Broadbent and James Purefoy, the film was based on the 19th century novel by William Makepeace Thackeray and it was directed by Mira Nair. The film received mixed reviews.

In 2005, Garai received another BIFA nomination, this time for Best Supporting Actress, for her performance as Siobhan in the independent film Inside I'm Dancing. Her portrayal earned her the British Supporting Actress of the Year award from the London Film Critics Circle. Also in 2005, she starred in a two-part drama made for television, entitled The Incredible Journey of Mary Bryant. While critics hailed it as "pleasingly old-fashioned adventure," it was her performance that won the most admiration and earned her two nominations: Best Lead Actress in Television from the Australian Film Institute and Most Outstanding Actress in a Drama Series from the Logie Awards. The Observer noted: "As for the tireless Garai, she once again demonstrated an instinctive understanding of the vital difference between overperforming and overacting."

She appears in Kenneth Branagh's film adaptation of As You Like It (2006), as Celia. The film was released in some European cinemas before being broadcast in 2007 on HBO cable television in the U.S. In 2009, it opened in cinemas in Mexico. Also in 2006, she starred in the biographical drama film Amazing Grace, which was directed by Michael Apted and co-starring Ioan Gruffudd, Benedict Cumberbatch and Michael Gambon. The film was about William Wilberforce, a leader of the movement to abolish the slave trade. Garai played Barbara Spooner, the wife of Wilberforce. The film received generally positive reviews.

In 2007, Garai starred as Angel Deverell in François Ozon's Angel. The Independent named her one of the actresses of the year for her performance in the film. She was nominated for the Prix Lumiere award (the French equivalent of the Golden Globes), as Best Female Newcomer for Angel, making her the first British actress to be nominated for the award. Also in 2007, she starred in the Oscar-nominated film Atonement as the 18-year-old Briony Tallis. Co-starring Keira Knightley, James McAvoy, Vanessa Redgrave, Saoirse Ronan and Brenda Blethyn, the film went on to receive seven Academy Award nominations, including Best Picture. Garai earned a Best Actress nomination from the Evening Standard British Film Awards for her performance. She appeared in two Royal Shakespeare Company productions: as Cordelia in King Lear and as Nina in The Seagull, starring alongside Ian McKellen, Frances Barber, Sylvester McCoy, Jonathan Hyde and William Gaunt. The run, which toured the world, went into residence in the New London Theatre where it ended mid-January 2008. She received rave reviews, especially as Nina in The Seagull: The Independent called her a "woman on the edge of stardom", while This is London called her "superlative", and said that the play was "distinguished by the illuminating, psychological insights of Miss Garai's performance". She reprised her role as Cordelia in a televised version of King Lear.

In 2008, she appeared in the feature film The Other Man alongside Liam Neeson, Laura Linney and Antonio Banderas. Garai next starred in Stephen Poliakoff's World War II thriller Glorious 39, alongside Julie Christie, Jenny Agutter, Bill Nighy, Christopher Lee and Eddie Redmayne. The film had its world premiere at the Toronto International Film Festival.

In 2009, she played the title role in a television adaptation of Jane Austen's Emma, a four-hour miniseries that premiered on BBC One in October 2009, co-starring Jonny Lee Miller and Sir Michael Gambon. Garai was nominated for a Golden Globe for her performance. Emma then appeared on American television as part of PBS' Masterpiece Classic anthology series, airing in most U.S. markets over three consecutive Sunday evenings during January and February 2010.

In 2009, The Sunday Times Magazine named her as one of Britain's rising stars alongside Matthew Goode, Andrea Riseborough, Hugh Dancy, Eddie Redmayne and others. In January of that year she travelled to the Syrian-Iraqi border to make a short film titled No Man's Land for the UNHCR, highlighting the plight of 800 Palestinian refugees living in the Al-Tanaf refugee camp. Of her visit to the refugee camps Garai states, "My trip to a refugee camp in Syria destroyed any hope that the horrors of Iraq might end, or that we are doing enough to help its victims." Garai has been hailed by her Glorious 39 director Stephen Poliakoff as "the next Kate Winslet" and someone who will "dominate British cinema" in the future.

=== 2010–2020 ===
In 2011, Garai starred in the four-part BBC drama The Crimson Petal and the White based on the novel by Michel Faber. She was nominated for Best Actress at the 2012 BAFTA awards for the role. In 2011 she played Bel Rowley in the TV drama The Hour leading with Dominic West and Ben Whishaw for which she was Golden Globe nominated. Later that year she played the lead role of Becky in the stage play The Village Bike at the Royal Court for which she was critically lauded.

Garai starred alongside actress Anne Hathaway and Jim Sturgess in Lone Scherfig's One Day. She played the part of a drug addicted single mother in the independent British film Junkhearts with Eddie Marsan and Tom Sturridge. She reprised her role as Bel Rowley in the second season of The Hour, which ran from 14 November to 13 December 2012. In 2013 she appeared in the sci-fi film The Last Days on Mars. In 2015 she played Isabella in Measure for Measure at the Young Vic, with her performance described as 'astonishing', 'wonderfully impassioned' and 'thrilling'. That same year she had a supporting role in Suffragette written by The Hour scribe Abi Morgan, and a leading role in the 90-minute drama Churchill's Secret opposite Michael Gambon and Lindsay Duncan for ITV.

Garai's recent radio drama work for BBC Radio 4 includes The Stone Tape adapted by Peter Strickland, and the lead in two of the conspiracy thriller series Tracks by Matthew Broughton in 2016 and 2019. In 2017, she appeared in the Channel 4 miniseries Born to Kill as Jenny, the mother of a seemingly ordinary 16-year-old schoolboy who appears to have psychopathic tendencies. From June to September 2017 she appeared as Sarah Churchill in the London premiere of Helen Edmundson's Queen Anne. Garai appeared as Marin Brandt in BBC One's adaptation of the period thriller novel The Miniaturist. Garai starred in Ella Hickson's play The Writer at the Almeida Theatre in London from 14 April to 26 May 2018. In 2020 she portrayed Eleonor Marx in the movie Miss Marx by Susanna Nicchiarelli.

=== 2021–present ===
In 2023, Garai wrote a screenplay called Monstrous Beauty. She plans to direct this film, which will star Bella Ramsey, Ruth Negga, and Dominic West. Also in 2023, she played Juno Fish in the BBC thriller series The Following Events Are Based on a Pack of Lies.

In 2024 Garai played Annie Ernaux in the stage adaptation of her autobiographical novel The Years.

== Other work ==
Garai has written for The Guardian.

In 2012 she wrote and directed the short film Scrubber, casting Amanda Hale, Michelle Duncan, Honor Kneafsey and Steven Robertson. The film was shown at the Edinburgh film festival where it was nominated for Best British Short Film, at Sundance film festival where it was nominated for Best International Short Film, at London Short Film Festival where it won the Underwire Award for Best Female Character, and at Cannes where it screened in the Short Film Corner. The film was released as part of a short film collection, The Joy of Six, a Soda Pictures Release.

It was announced on 18 April 2018 that Garai was to make her feature directorial debut with Amulet (previously named Outside), a horror film written by Garai and starring Carla Juri, Imelda Staunton and Alec Secareanu. The film went into production in autumn 2018. It was released on VOD in July 2020.

== Personal life ==
In 2009, Garai obtained a degree in English literature from the Open University.

In March 2013, she gave birth to a daughter, and the following year married her boyfriend, British actor Sam Hoare. Their second child was born in August 2016.

Garai has criticised the film industry's attitudes towards women. She enjoys travelling and cooking, which she has described as "therapeutic".

== Filmography ==
Key
†	Denotes films that have not yet been released

=== Film ===
Year	Film	Role	Notes
2002	Nicholas Nickleby	Kate Nickleby	
2003	I Capture the Castle	Cassandra Mortmain	
2004	Dirty Dancing: Havana Nights	Katey Miller	
2004	Vanity Fair	Amelia Sedley	
2004	Inside I'm Dancing	Siobhan	
2005	Midsummer Dream	Helena (voice)	English-language version
2006	Renaissance	Ilona Tasuiev	English-language version
2006	Scoop	Vivian	
2006	As You Like It	Celia	
2006	Amazing Grace	Barbara Spooner	
2007	Angel	Angel Deverell	
2007	Running for River	Blair	Short
2007	Atonement	Briony Tallis – Aged 18	
2008	The Other Man	Abigail	
2009	Glorious 39	Anne Keyes	
2011	Junkhearts	Christine	
2011	One Day	Sylvie	
2012	Whitelands	Jen	Short
2013	Having You	Camilla	
2013	The Last Days on Mars	Rebecca Lane	
2013	Legacy	Anna March	
2015	Suffragette	Alice Haughton	
2016	Last Call	Caitlin Thomas	
2020	Amulet	—N/a	As director and writer
2020	Miss Marx	Eleanor Marx	
2021	Earwig	Celeste	
2023	The Critic	Madeleine Farewell	
2023	One Life	Doreen Warriner	
2024	Scoop	Esme Wren	
TBA	Monstrous Beauty †	—N/a	As director and writer

=== Television ===
Year	Film	Role	Notes
2000	The Last of the Blonde Bombshells	Young Elizabeth	TV film
2000–02	Attachments	Zoe Atkins	
2001	Perfect	Charlotte	TV film
2002	Daniel Deronda	Gwendolen Harleth	
2005	The Incredible Journey of Mary Bryant	Mary Bryant	Miniseries
2008	Great Performances	Cordelia	Episode: "King Lear"
2009	Emma	Emma Woodhouse	Miniseries (4 episodes)
2011	The Crimson Petal and the White	Sugar	Miniseries (4 episodes)
2011–12	The Hour	Bel Rowley	12 episodes
2014	The Great War: The People's Story	Kate Parry Frye	Documentary miniseries
2016	Churchill's Secret	Nurse Millie Appleyard	TV film
2017	Born to Kill	Jenny	Miniseries
2017–18	The Miniaturist	Marin Brandt	
2018	Snatches: Moments From Women's Lives	Ann	Episode: "Compliance"
2020	The Windermere Children	Marie Paneth	TV film
2022	Becoming Elizabeth	Mary I	
2023	The Following Events Are Based on a Pack of Lies	Juno Fish	
2023	Vigil	Squadron Leader Eliza Russell	Series 2
2026	Betrayal	Claire Hughes	Miniseries (4 episodes)
2026	Adultery	Beth Brookes	Main cast

=== Audio ===
Year	Title	Role	Company	Notes
2016, 2019	Tracks	Dr. Helen Ash	BBC Radio 4	Portrayed character in series 1 and 4; Hattie Morahan and Olivia Poulet took over the role in series 3 and 5 respectively.

== Stage credits ==
Year	Title	Role	Company	Notes
2004	Calico	Lucia	Sonia Friedman Productions	Directed by Ed Hall
2007	King Lear	Cordelia	Royal Shakespeare Company	Directed by Trevor Nunn
2007	The Seagull	Nina	Royal Shakespeare Company	Directed by Trevor Nunn
2010	Three Sisters	Masha	Lyric Hammersmith	Directed by Sean Holmes and Filter
2011	The Village Bike	Becky	Royal Court Theatre	Directed by Joe Hill-Gibbons; Won the 2011 George Devine Award
2014	Indian Ink	Flora	Roundabout	Directed by Carey Perloff
2015	Measure for Measure	Isabella	The Young Vic	Directed by Joe Hill-Gibbons
2017	Queen Anne	Sarah, Duchess of Marlborough	Theatre Royal Haymarket	Written by Helen Edmundson and directed by Natalie Abrahami
2018	The Writer	The Writer	Almeida Theatre	Written by Ella Hickson and directed by Blanche McIntyre
2024	The Years	Annie 3	Almeida Theatre	Adapted and directed by Eline Arbo
2024	Giant	Jessie Stone	Royal Court Theatre	Directed by Nicholas Hytner
2025	The Years	Annie 3 (Lead role)	Harold Pinter Theatre	Adapted and directed by Eline Arbo
2026	A Doll's House	Nora	Almeida Theatre	Adapted by Anya Reiss and directed by Joe Hill-Gibbons

== Awards and nominations ==
Year	Award	Category	Project	Result	Ref.
2002	National Board of Review	Best Acting by an Ensemble	Nicholas Nickleby	Won	
2003	London Film Critics Circle	British Newcomer of the Year	I Capture the Castle	Nominated	
2003	British Independent Film Awards	Most Promising Newcomer	I Capture the Castle	Nominated	
2004	London Film Critics Circle	British Supporting Actress of the Year	Inside I'm Dancing	Won	
2004	British Independent Film Awards	Best Supporting Actress	Inside I'm Dancing	Nominated	
2007	Evening Standard British Film Awards	Best Actress	Atonement	Nominated	
2010	Golden Globe Awards	Best Actress in a Miniseries or Television Film	Emma	Nominated	
2011	British Academy Television Awards	Best Actress	The Crimson Petal and the White	Nominated	
2011	Golden Globe Awards	Best Actress in a Miniseries or Television Film	The Hour	Nominated	
2012	Critics' Choice Television Awards	Best Actress in a Movie / Miniseries	The Hour	Nominated	
2025	Laurence Olivier Awards	Best Actress in a Supporting Role	The Years	Won	
2025	Laurence Olivier Awards	Best Actress in a Supporting Role	Giant	Nominated	
