= The Book of Strange New Things =

Science fiction novel by Michel Faber

- First edition
- Author: Michel Faber
- Language: English
- Genre: Science fiction
- Published: October 6, 2014 (UK); October 28, 2014 (US)
- Publisher: Canongate Books (UK); Hogarth (US)
- Publication place: United Kingdom
- Media type: Print, ebook, audiobook
- Pages: 512 pp
- ISBN: 978-1-782-11407-9
- Preceded by: The Fire Gospel

The Book of Strange New Things is a 2014 science fiction novel by Dutch-born author Michel Faber. The work was first published in the United Kingdom on October 6, 2014, and concerns an English pastor who is sent to the planet of Oasis to teach its reclusive native inhabitants about Christianity.

Amazon Studios released a pilot episode of a television adaptation, Oasis, in March 2017.

== Plot ==
Peter Leigh, an English pastor, decides to leave his wife Beatrice in order to be a missionary. It is gradually revealed that rather than being a missionary in a different country, he has been hired by USIC, a private American corporation, to preach to the population of a distant planet, Oasis. Peter expects to find hostility when meeting the natives, but he finds instead that they are extremely welcoming, already speak English very well and are passionate devotees of the Christian faith, referring to themselves as Jesus Lover One, Two, et cetera. Peter sets to work trying to build a church for the Jesus Lovers and trying to live amongst them.

On his brief trips back to the base camp where the engineers and scientist who run USIC on Oasis live, he tries to contact Bea using a Shoot, a message system which allows him to communicate back on Earth. Though Bea's initial messages are full of love, they also include information on severe natural disasters caused by climate change, including flooding and famine that have happened since Peter left. After a few months, she also informs Peter that she is pregnant with his child, conceived on the last night he was with her. Peter, whose life is full with his missionary work, feels distant from Bea and begins to find it difficult to recall her face and their life together, instead focusing on integrating himself into the Oasan community.

While helping the Oasans with a harvest, which they trade with the USIC population for medicine, Peter receives a terrible bite from an Oasan pest. The community is horrified and treat him as though he is dying. Peter believes he has been poisoned, but nevertheless he goes back to USIC, where he is treated for his wounds and receives a message from Bea telling him that there is no God. In distress, Peter decides to go back to the Oasan village in order to die, but he accidentally finds the village they abandoned before he arrived, where he meets the linguist that was his predecessor. The linguist warns him that the USIC workers are not as harmonious as they appear and that Earth is dying.

The following day, he is retrieved by Grainger, the USIC pharmacist with whom he is closest. Grainger implies Peter may have been hallucinating as he was severely dehydrated. Back at the USIC base camp, he learns that his favorite Oasan, Jesus Lover Five, has come to the base camp seeking treatment, as a fallen painting which bruised her hand has led to her dying. Peter realizes with horror that the reason Oasans have embraced Jesus so much is because they are terribly vulnerable to injury and death, and they take the tales of healing miracles, Heaven and Jesus rising from the grave literally.

Based on Bea's attitude and the fact that he has unintentionally deceived the Oasans, Peter decides to return to Earth. He visits the Oasan town once more where his congregation, who last saw him receiving severe injuries, treat his return as a miracle. As a parting gift to them, he tries to explain that humans are capable of recovering from injuries in a way the Oasans are not, but they remain faithful Christians nevertheless. Before he leaves for Earth, Peter receives a last message from Bea which tells him to stay where he is, as she has to relocate and Earth is unsafe. However, Peter is resolved to return to her and their unborn child and remain with them even until the end of the world.

== Reception ==
Critical reception for The Book of Strange New Things has been mostly positive, and the work has received praise from io9, The New York Times, and The Independent. The Guardian praised the work for being "astonishing and deeply affecting" and wrote, "This is a big novel – partly because it has to construct and explain its unhomely setting, partly because it has such a lot of religious, linguistic, philosophical and political freight to deliver – but the reader is pulled through it at some pace by the gothic sense of anxiety that pervades and taints every element." NPR was more mixed in their review, commenting that as a work of science fiction the book was overly familiar and compared it unfavorably to A Canticle for Leibowitz while also stating that Faber "tells a beautifully human story of love, loss, faith and the sometimes uncrossable distances between people. It feels, more than anything, like an achingly gentle 500-page first chapter to an apocalypse novel yet to come." The Portsmouth Review calls it "a brilliant look at how distance can change what we see and where we place our loyalty."
