= Alex Hassell =

English actor (born 1980)

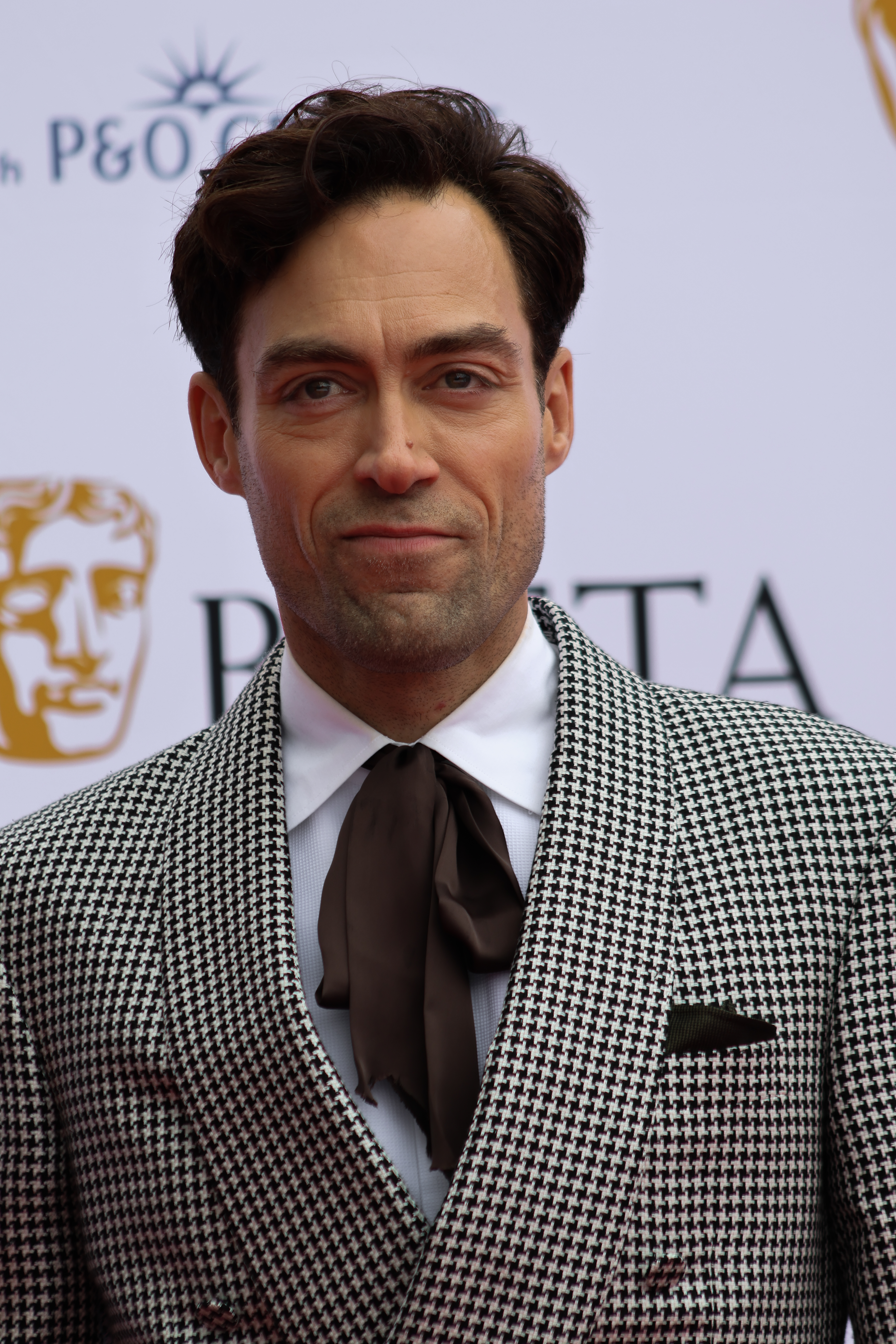
- Hassell at the 2026 British Academy Television Awards
- Born: Alexander Stephen Hassell; 7 September 1980 (age 46); Southend-on-Sea, England
- Occupation: Actor
- Years active: 2001–present
- Spouse: Emma King (m. 2011)

Alexander Stephen Hassell (born 7 September 1980) is an English actor, and co-founder of The Factory Theatre Company. On television, he is known for his roles in the ITV series Bonkers (2007), the BBC series The Miniaturist (2017), the Netflix series Cowboy Bebop (2021), the HBO series His Dark Materials (2022) and the Disney+ series Rivals (2024). His films include Suburbicon (2017) and Locked In (2023).

== Early life and education ==
Alexander Stephen Hassell was born on September 7, 1980, in Southend, England, the youngest of four, to a vicar.

After completing his education at Moulsham High School, in Chelmsford, Essex, he studied acting for a further two and a half years at the Central School of Speech and Drama.

== Career ==
Hassel has appeared in a number of stage roles, most recently as Hal in Henry IV Parts I and II, and Henry in Henry V, for the Royal Shakespeare Company. He is co-founder of The Factory Theatre Company whose patrons include Ewan McGregor, Bill Nighy, Mark Rylance, and Emma Thompson.

His debut television appearance was in 2001, in an episode of Queen of Swords. His first Hollywood role was in George Clooney's Suburbicon (2017), in a cast which included Matt Damon and Julianne Moore. and later that year he appeared in his first major television role in the BBC adaptation of Jessie Burton's The Miniaturist, alongside Anya Taylor-Joy, which first aired on Boxing Day 2017.

Hassell appeared as Translucent in the first season of The Boys (2019) on Amazon Prime Video, Vicious in Netflix's Cowboy Bebop in 2021, and Metatron in the final season of the BBC/HBO fantasy series His Dark Materials.

He has a leading role in the 2024 Disney+ TV adaptation of the 1986 novel Rivals, playing playboy Rupert Campbell Black, alongside a cast that included David Tennant, Danny Dyer, Aidan Turner, Emily Atack, and Katherine Parkinson.

== Personal life ==
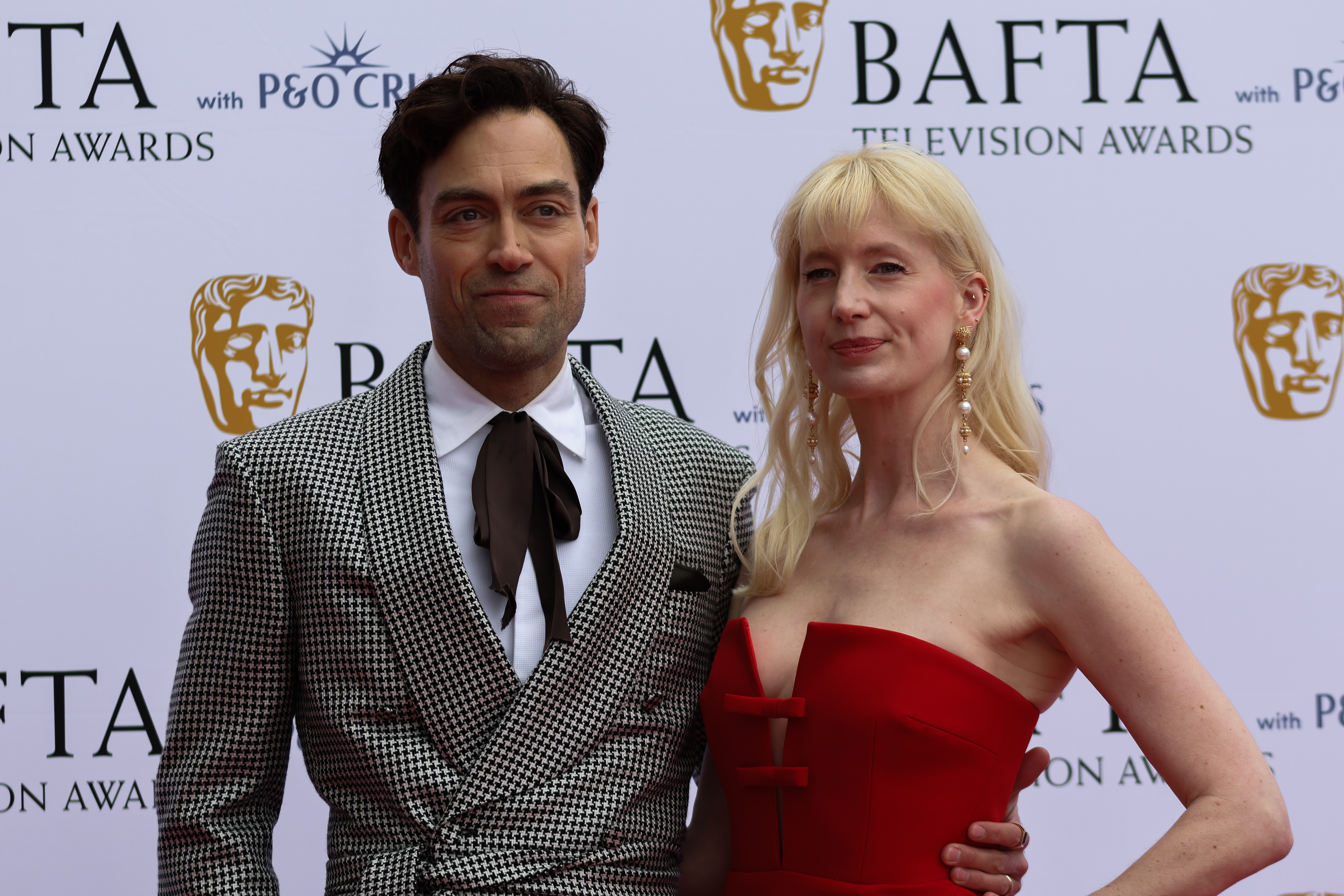
Hassell and King in 2026

Hassell married fellow actor Emma King in January 2011. The two met during their acting training at the Central School of Speech and Drama.

== Filmography ==
Key
†	Denotes projects that have not yet been released

=== Film ===
Year	Title	Role	Notes
2003	Cold Mountain	Orderly	
2008	The Sickhouse	Nick	
2011	Anonymous	Spencer	
2012	The Grind	Drug Dealer	
2014	Miss in Her Teens	The Player	
2015	Two Down	John Thomas	
2017	Suburbicon	Louis	
2018	The Isle	Oliver Gosling	
2019	The Red Sea Diving Resort	Max Rose	
2021	The Tragedy of Macbeth	Ross	
2022	Violent Night	Jason Lightstone	
2023	Locked In	Doctor Robert Lawrence	
2024	Young Woman and the Sea	Harry Horlick	
2026	Wasteman	Paul	

=== Television ===
Year	Title	Role	Notes
2001	Queen of Swords	Andreo Rey	Episode: "The Pretender"
2003	Murder in Mind	Jules	Episode: "Contract"
2003	Danielle Cable: Eyewitness	Stephen Cameron	Television film
2003	Death in Holy Orders	Peter Buckhurst	2 episodes
2003	Warrior Queen	Roman Officer	Television film
2003	The Private Life of Samuel Pepys	Balty	Television film
2005	Kenneth Tynan: In Praise of Hardcore	Mike	Television film
2005	Murphy's Law	Scott Garvey	Episode: "Extra Mile"
2006	Robin Hood	2nd Sheriff's Man	2 episodes
2006	Torchwood	Mark Lynch	Episode: "Combat"
2007	Bonkers	Felix Nash	6 episodes
2008	Love Soup	Jake Randall	Episode: "Green Widow"
2008	The Bill	Marcus Kendall	Episode: "After the Fall"
2009	A Midsummer Night's Dream	Lysander / Flute	Television film
2009	Legend of the Seeker	Eryn	Episode: "Fever"
2009	Miranda	Edmund Dettori	Episode: "Excuse"
2011	Hustle	Viscount Manley	Episode: "Silent Witness"
2013	Jo	Piet Nykvist	Episode: "Place de la Concorde"
2013	Way to Go	Philip	Episode: "Dead End"
2013	Life of Crime	Colin Nash	2 episodes
2013	Big Thunder	Abel White	Television film
2014	Silent Witness	Simon Turner	2 episodes
2017	The Miniaturist	Johannes Brandt	3 episodes
2018	Genius	Manach	2 episodes
2018	The Bisexual	David	Episode #1.5
2019	Grantchester	Ernest Carter	Episode #4.4
2019	The Boys	Translucent	3 episodes
2021	Cowboy Bebop	Vicious	10 episodes
2022	His Dark Materials	Metatron	Main role
2023	Everything Now	Rick	Main role
2024–present	Rivals	Rupert Campbell-Black	Lead role
TBA	Army of Shadows		Upcoming series

=== Audiobooks ===
In 2025, Hassell was revealed as Lucius Malfoy in Audible's full-cast audio adaptations of the Harry Potter books.

Year	Title	Role	Notes
2025	Harry Potter And The Philosopher's Stone	Lucius Malfoy	
2025	Harry Potter And The Chamber Of Secrets	Lucius Malfoy	
2026	Harry Potter And The Prisoner Of Azkaban	Lucius Malfoy	
2026	Harry Potter And The Goblet Of Fire	Lucius Malfoy	
2026	Harry Potter And The Order Of The Phoenix	Lucius Malfoy	
2026	Harry Potter And The Half-Blood Prince	Lucius Malfoy	
2026	Harry Potter And The Deathly Hallows	Lucius Malfoy	
