= Murderland =

- Intertitle of episode one
- Genre: Mystery drama
- Created by: David Pirie
- Written by: David Pirie
- Directed by: Catherine Morshead
- Starring: Robbie Coltrane; Bel Powley; Amanda Hale; Lucy Cohu; Sharon Small
- Country of origin: United Kingdom
- No. of series: 1
- No. of episodes: 3

Production
- Production company: Touchpaper Scotland

Original release
- Network: ITV
- Release: 19 October – 2 November 2009

Murderland is a three-part British television series created by David Pirie and directed by Catherine Morshead. The series also marks a return to ITV for Robbie Coltrane. The series was filmed in June 2009 and the first episode was transmitted on Monday, 19 October 2009.

== Plot summary ==
Murderland tells of the mystery surrounding a traumatic murder, as seen from the perspective of the three primary characters. Carrie, the daughter of the murdered woman, Douglas Hain, the detective in charge of the investigation, and Sally, the murder victim, all have their story to tell. Haunted by her mother's murder when she was a child, Carrie seeks to uncover the truth so that she can move on with her life. As the investigation unfolds, Carrie's yearning to discover who murdered her mother grows more intense, bringing her closer to the detective working the case.

== Cast ==
- DI Douglas Hain - Robbie Coltrane
- Carrie - Bel Powley
- Carol - Amanda Hale
- Sally - Lucy Cohu
- Dr. Laura Maitland - Sharon Small
- Oliver - Nicholas Gleaves
- Whitaker - Andrew Tiernan
- Crawford - Guy Henry
- Tony Philips - David Westhead

== Episodes ==
Ep. #	Title	Writer	Director	Airdate	Ratings (m)
1	"Carrie's Story"	David Pirie	Catherine Morshead	19 October 2009	7.32
One night in 1994 Carrie comes home from a party to find her mother Sally, a prostitute, had been murdered. Carrie sees a man's shadow on the wall and, whilst phoning the police, observed a man with a blood-stained hand. She is keen to help D.I. Hain in his investigation, though the crime goes unsolved. Fifteen years later, Carrie, now known as Carol, is about to get married. She goes to visit Hain to help put the tragedy of her mother's murder behind her.
2	"Hain's Story"	David Pirie	Catherine Morshead	26 October 2009	6.61
Hain explains to Carol his own position fifteen years earlier and how he was dropped from the case because he was a client of Sally, whom he loved. Hain used Cleo's, the massage parlour where Sally worked, to gain information from her former colleagues. He suspected another policeman, Oliver, of having shady dealings with Tony Phillips, the man behind Cleo's. Hain was subsequently given early retirement. Carol decides to go under cover herself at the massage parlour to see if she can find answers.
3	"Carol's Story"	David Pirie	Catherine Morshead	2 November 2009	6.56
Hain and Carol continue to dig into the past, despite death threats. Carol registers at the massage parlour as Angel and forces Whittaker, a regular client, to admit he took photographs for a pædophile ring. Carol tracks down another victim, Andrew, who identifies Rachel as a procuress for the group. Rachel names Phillips and Oliver as its ring-leaders and admits she saw the murderer of Sally but was forced to keep quiet at the time.

== Home media ==
The complete series of Murderland was released on DVD on 1 February 2010.
