= Jessie Burton =

British author and actress

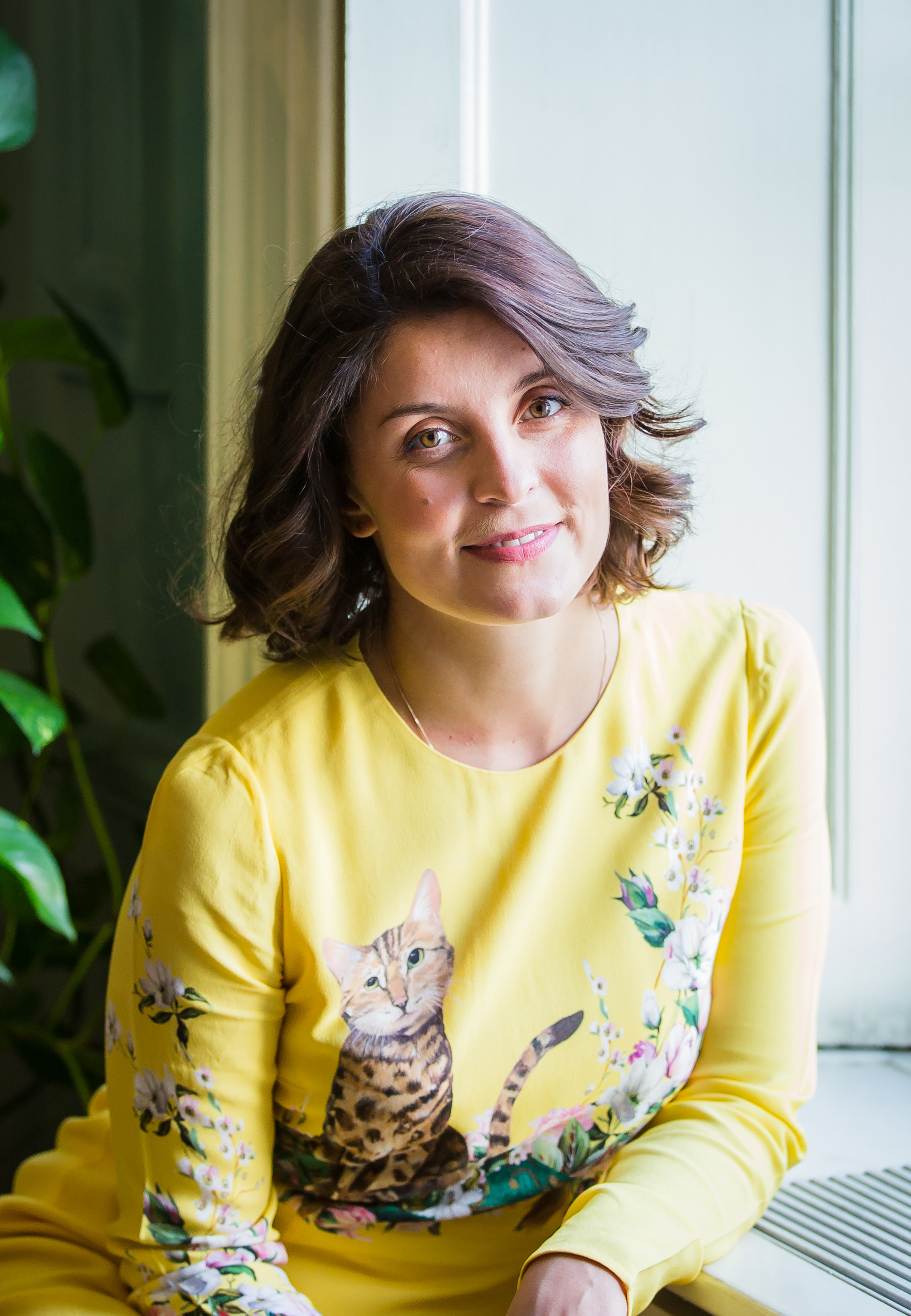
- Jessie Burton, at Bloomsbury publishers, April 2018
- Born: Jessica Kathryn Burton; 17 August 1982 (age 43); London, England
- Education: Central School of Speech and Drama; Brasenose College, Oxford
- Occupations: Author, actress

Jessica Kathryn Burton (born 17 August 1982) is an English author; As of 2025, she has published four novels, The Miniaturist, The Muse, The Confession, The House of Fortune and three books for children, The Restless Girls, Medusa and Hidden Treasure. All four adult novels were Sunday Times best-sellers, with The Miniaturist, The Muse and The House of Fortune reaching no. 1, and both The Miniaturist and The Muse were New York Times best-sellers, and Radio 4's Books at Bedtime. Collectively her novels have been published in almost 40 languages. Her short stories have been published in Harpers Bazaar US and Stylist.

Burton is also a non-fiction writer. Her essays have been published in The Wall Street Journal, The Independent, Vogue, Elle, Red, Grazia, Lonely Planet Traveller and The Spectator.

== Early life and career ==
Burton grew up in Wimbledon, South London, her parents originally from Battersea. Burton attended Lady Margaret School in Fulham. She went on to graduate from Brasenose College, Oxford and the Central School of Speech and Drama.

A former stage actress, Burton's work in theatre includes The Hour We Knew Nothing of Each Other at the National Theatre, London in 2008. Having aimed to be "a successful stage actress", by the age of 28 she had stalled in this career, and "could see the writing on the wall - the dream to be the next Kate Winslet wasn’t going to happen. I never fell out of love with acting, it fell out of love with me"; difficulty in getting auditions meant she worked temp jobs, including as a personal assistant in the City of London.

== Writing career ==
Burton's 2014 debut novel The Miniaturist is set in 17th-century Amsterdam. The novel is inspired by Petronella Oortman's dollhouse now at the Rijksmuseum, although it does not otherwise attempt to be a biographical novel. The Miniaturist took over four years to write. It was the subject of a bidding war at the April 2013 London Book Fair. It was adapted as a two-part miniseries for the BBC and PBS Masterpiece in 2017.

Burton's second novel, The Muse, was published in 2016 and is set in a dual time-frame, during the Spanish Civil War and 30 years later in 1960s London. It was nominated for the 2016 Books Are My Bag Readers' Awards.

Burton's first novel for children, The Restless Girls, was published in September 2018. The story is based on the Brothers Grimm tale, The Twelve Dancing Princesses.

Her third novel for adults, The Confession, was published in 2019. Medusa, her second book for children, was published in 2021.

The House of Fortune, a sequel to The Miniaturist, was published in 2022.

Hidden Treasure was published in 2025. This was the first book written since she became a mum and was described as children's fantasy and pure magic by The Telegraph.

== Works ==
Adult novels

- The Miniaturist (Picador, 2014)
- The Muse (Picador, 2016)
- The Confession (Picador, 2019)
- The House of Fortune (Picador, 2022)

Children's books

- The Restless Girls (Bloomsbury, 2018)
- Medusa (Bloomsbury, 2021)
- Hidden Treasure (Bloomsbury, 2025)

== Awards and recognitions ==
- 2014 Waterstones "Book of the Year" winner for The Miniaturist
- 2014 Specsavers National Book Awards: New Writer of the Year for The Miniaturist
- 2014 Specsavers National Book Awards: Book of the Year for The Miniaturist
- 2023 Carnegie Medal: Shortlisted for Medusa
