= Amanda Hale =

English actress (born 1982)

- Born: 2 October 1982 (age 44); London, England
- Occupation: Actress
- Years active: 2005–present

Amanda Hale (born 2 October 1982) is an English actress.

== Early life ==
Hale is one of four children born to Irish immigrant parents in northwest London. Her cousin is scientist Martin Glennie. She had been due to go to University of Oxford to study English but changed her mind and decided to become an actress.

Some of her earliest acting experience included plays at the National Youth Theatre. Hale trained at the Royal Academy of Dramatic Art, graduating in 2005. At drama school, she won the Audience Prize and Best Fight Award at the 2003 RADA Prize Fights.

== Career ==
Hale was nominated for two Evening Standard Theatre Awards (the Milton Shulman Award for Outstanding Newcomer and Best Actress) in November 2007 for her critically acclaimed performance as Laura Wingfield in Tennessee Williams' classic play The Glass Menagerie at the Apollo Theatre in London.

In September 2009, Hale made her Royal National Theatre debut in Our Class, a new play by Tadeusz Slobodzianek, and in October 2009, she appeared alongside Robbie Coltrane and Sharon Small in the new three-part ITV1 drama Murderland. In April 2011, she appeared as Agnes Rackham in the BBC adaptation The Crimson Petal and the White with co-star Romola Garai. The following year, she collaborated again with Garai in the short film Scrubber. In June 2013, she played Margaret Beaufort, mother of Henry VII, in the BBC series The White Queen, based on Philippa Gregory's best-selling historical novel series The Cousins' War. In the same year, she starred as Elinor Dashwood in Helen Edmundson's BBC Radio 4 adaptation of Sense and Sensibility.

=== Select credits ===
| Year | Title | Role | Notes |
|---|---|---|---|
| 2005 | The Importance of Being Earnest | Cecily Cardew | Oxford Playhouse (August–September) |
| 2006 | Crooked | Laney | Bush Theatre (May–June) |
| 2007 | The Glass Menagerie | Laura Wingfield | Apollo Theatre (January–May) |
| 2007 | Persuasion | Mary Elliot Musgrove | |
| 2007 | Jekyll | Sally | Episode #1.4 |
| 2007 | Richard is My Boyfriend | Anna Taylor | |
| 2008 | The City | Jenny | Royal Court Theatre |
| 2008 | Pornography | | Traverse Theatre/ Birmingham Rep |
| 2008–2009 | King Lear | Cordelia | Headlong Theatre |
| 2009 | Pornography | | BBC Radio 3 |
| 2009 | After Dido | Helen | Young Vic |
| 2009 | Bright Star | Reynolds' Sister | |
| 2009 | Murderland | Carol | ITV1 |
| 2010 | Spooks | Meg Kirby | BBC One |
| 2011 | Rev | Abi Johnston | Series 2, episode No. 2 |
| 2011 | The Crimson Petal and the White | Mrs. Agnes Rackham | BBC Two |
| 2012 | Scrubber | Jenny | Short film |
| 2012–2013 | Ripper Street | Emily Reid | BBC One |
| 2013 | The White Queen | Margaret Beaufort | BBC One |
| 2013 | Being Human | Lady Mary | BBC Three |
| 2013 | Dates | Helen | Episode #1.8 |
| 2013 | The Invisible Woman | Fanny Ternan | |
| 2013 | Sense and Sensibility | Elinor Dashwood | BBC Radio 4 |
| 2014 | Uncle Vanya | Sonya | St. James Theatre (October–November) |
| 2015–2019 | Catastrophe | Catherine | Channel 4 |
| 2016 | Jane Eyre | Jane Eyre | BBC Radio 4 |
| 2017 | Three Girls | Rachel Smith | BBC One; Episode #1.3 |
| 2019 | Star Wars: The Rise of Skywalker | Officer Tishra Kandia | Lucasfilm Ltd. and Bad Robot |
| 2020 | Death in Paradise | Vanessa McCormack | Red Planet Pictures; Episode: 9.1 "La Murder Le Diablé" |
| 2021 | A Discovery of Witches | Mary Sidney | Series 2, episodes 2 and 3 |
