= Petronella Oortman =

Dutch art collector

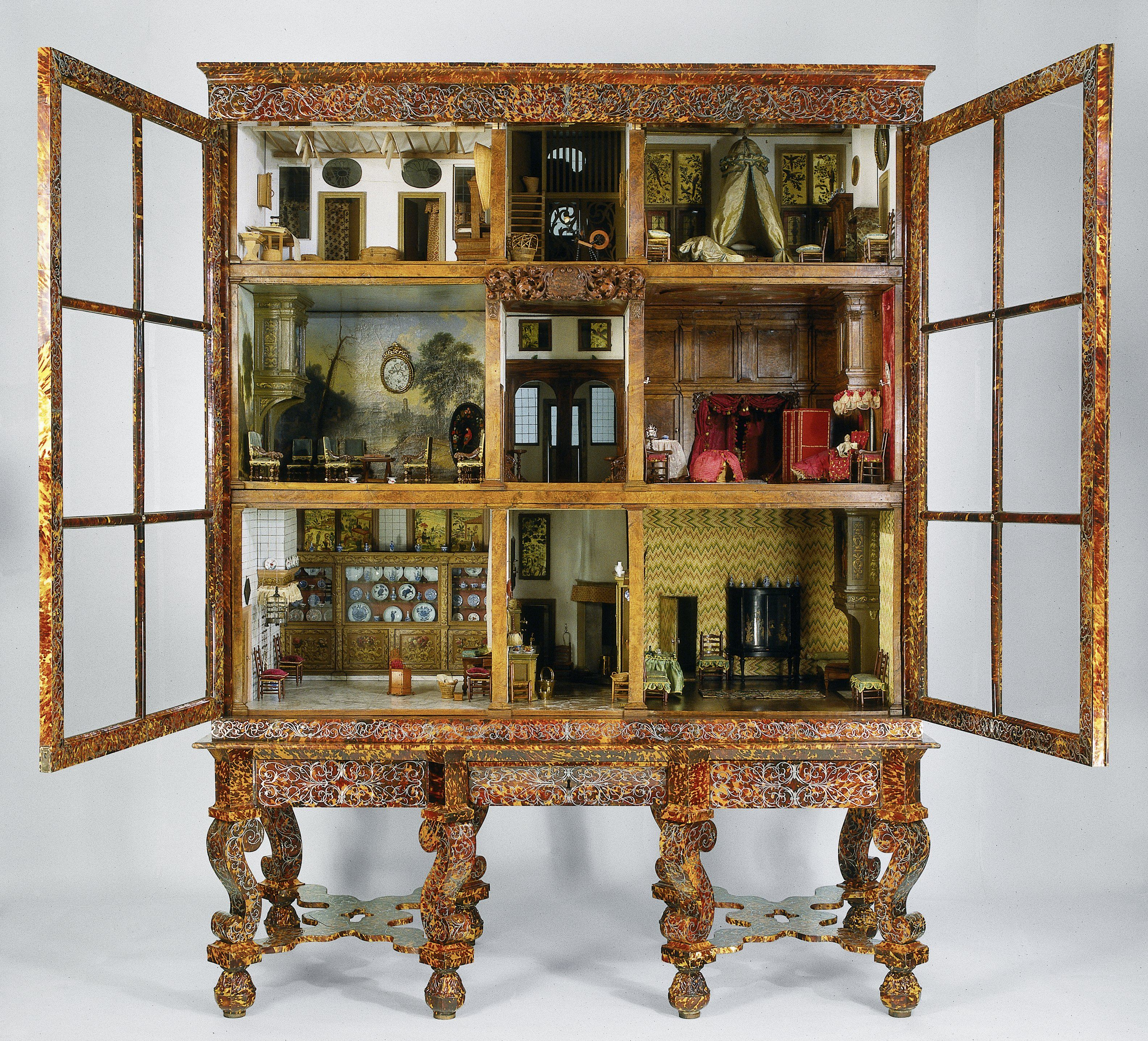
- The dollhouse in the Rijksmuseum in Amsterdam.
- Born: 1656; Amsterdam, Dutch Republic
- Died: November 27, 1716 (aged 59–60); Amsterdam, Dutch Republic
- Works: Dollhouse of Petronella Oortman
- Spouse: Johannes Brandt

Petronella Oortman (Dutch pronunciation: [peːtroːˈnɛlaː ˈʔoːrtmɑn]; 1656 – November 27, 1716) was a Dutch woman whose elaborate dollhouse is part of the permanent collection of the Rijksmuseum in Amsterdam.

Petronella Oortman should not be confused with her close namesake Petronella Oortmans-de la Court (1624–1707), who as it happens was also the owner of a noted dollhouse now in the collection of the Centraal Museum, Utrecht.

== Biography ==
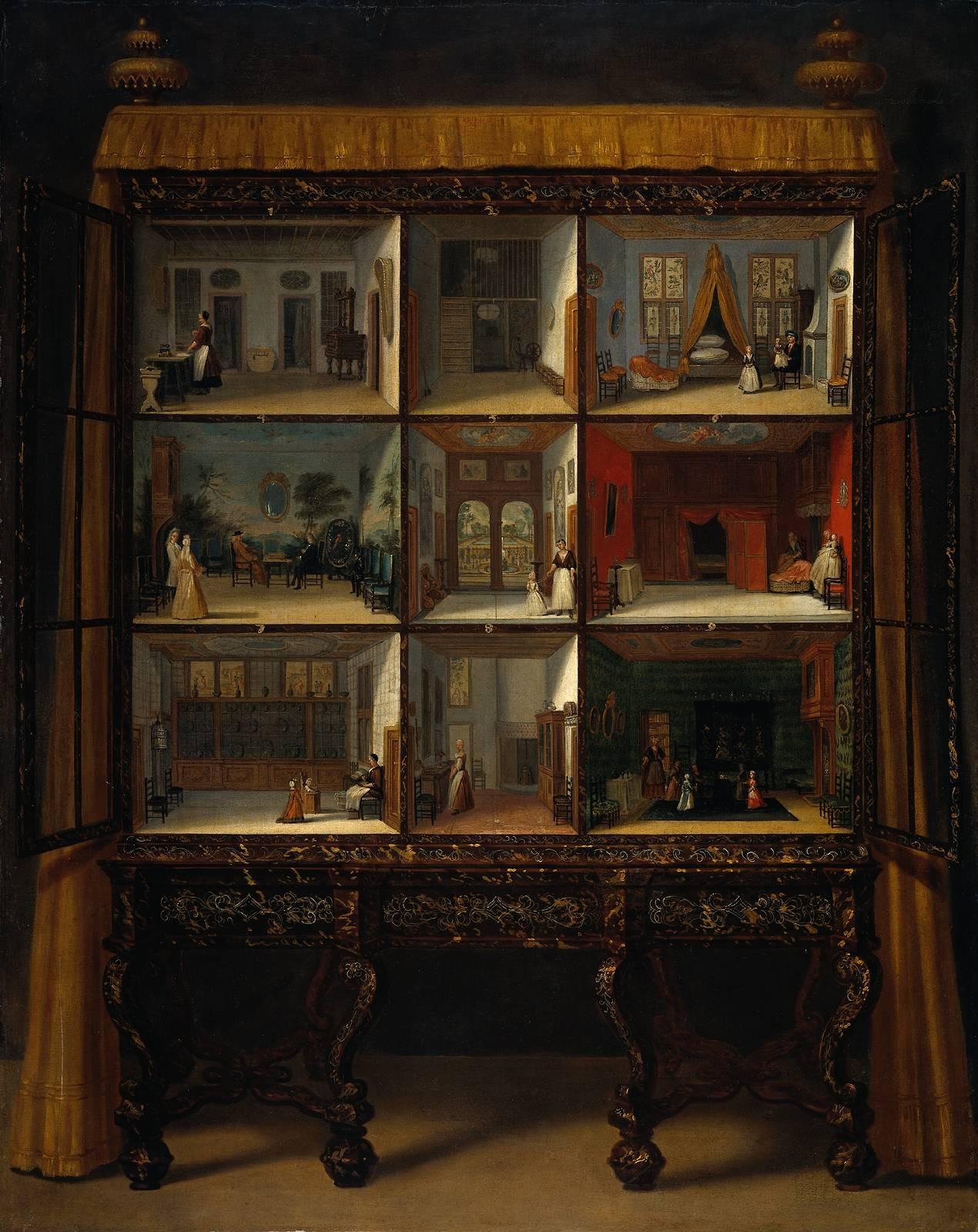
The dollhouse, painted by Jacob Appel, 1710.

Oortman grew up as one of seven children near the Singel canal, the daughter of a gun-maker. Oortman was a wealthy widow by the time (in 1686) she married silk merchant Johannes Brandt, with whom she lived on Warmoesstraat in Amsterdam.

Like other rich women in Amsterdam, she had a dollhouse built for her that she curated between 1686 and 1710, decorating it with expensive materials and miniatures.

At that time gentlemen often possessed "cabinets of curiosities" to hold collections of various objects they had acquired in their lives and travels: indeed such a cabinet can be seen in the small reception room (which also doubled as a funeral parlour) at the bottom right of the dollhouse.

In the Amsterdam of the Dutch Golden Age, their wealthy wives similarly created dollhouses as status symbols. The exact location of Oortman's house on Warmoesstraat is no longer known, and opinions differ as to how exact a copy the dollhouse would have been, but it would have represented Oortman's dreams and aspirations. Visitors to the household would be shown all the dollhouse's features in sessions that often lasted the entire evening.

After Oortman's death, the dollhouse passed to her daughter Hendrina and thence to Hendrina's brother Jan after 1743. According to Hendrina, her mother lavished some 30,000 guilders on the dollhouse, an enormous sum certainly sufficient to buy a canal house of the time. However, an inventory of Jan's estimated its value at just 700 guilders. By way of comparison, Petronella de la Court's dollhouse, for which 1,600 pieces of furniture and paintings and 28 fine dolls were commissioned, was sold in 1744 for 1,200 guilders. Already celebrated in the 18th century, Oortman's dollhouse was bought by the state in 1821 and purchased by the Rijksmuseum in 1875. A painting of the dollhouse was made in 1710 by Jacob Appel.

=== The dollhouse ===
The dollhouse contains nine rooms. The current state of the rooms is still very much like it was depicted in Appel's painting, though of the wax dolls—"dressed to perfection"—only the child in the nursery is left. Also missing are the doll clothes, which were still visible in a photograph from the 1950s. Willem Frederiksz van Royen painted a mural in the game room, and Johannes Voorhout decorated the tapestry room. Porcelain objects were ordered from China. Zacharias von Uffenbach noted in 1718 that it was the most valuable dollhouse in Europe, at between 20,000 and 30,000 guilders.

There are various accounts that Peter the Great attempted to buy such a dollhouse. Harry Donga suggests that Oortman's was the dollhouse manufactured on the order of Christoffel van Brants for Peter the Great; the Russian emperor stayed with the Van Brants family for a few days during his second visit to the Netherlands but left, allegedly after Van Brants and the emperor had a falling-out over the 30,000-guilder price demanded by Van Brants.

The dollhouse was the inspiration for the 2014 novel The Miniaturist by Jessie Burton.
