= Martin Glennie =

British biochemist

Martin J. Glennie is emeritus professor of immunochemistry (antibodies) at the University of Southampton, England.

== Career ==
Glennie earned his BSc and PhD at the University of Southampton, and is the current Head of the Cancer Sciences Unit there. Glennie is on the editorial board of the scientific journal mAbs (monoclonal antibodies) published by the Taylor & Francis Group.

== Public media interest ==
The clinical trial of an anti-CD40 monoclonal antibody chiLOB7/4 developed in Glennie's laboratory was reported by The Daily Telegraph in August 2013. Glennie stressed that “Ipilimumab works by taking the brakes off part of the immune system called T cells, while our compound revs up the T cells – it is like giving them a caffeine hit.".

== Personal life ==
Glennie is a keen angler, winning second prize (Lupa cup) in the Baltimore Deep Sea angling Festival 2014, South West Ireland.
