= Jacob Appel (painter) =

Dutch painter

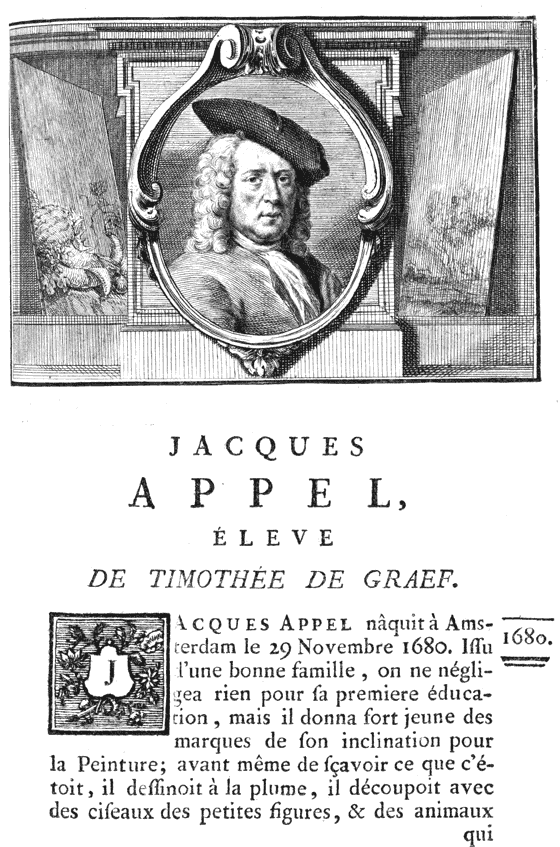
- Portrait by Jean-Baptiste Descamps in part 4 of his "La Vie des Peintres Flamands, allemands et hollandois", 1764
- Born: 1680; Amsterdam
- Died: 1751 (aged 70–71); Amsterdam

Jacob Appel (1680–1751) was a Dutch painter active in the 18th century. He was born in Amsterdam in 1680. After studying under Timotheus de Graaf in the years 1690–1692, he was instructed in landscape painting by David Van der Plaas. According to Descamps, he at first imitated the works of Tempesta, but later changed his style, and adopted that of Albert Meijeringh. He painted both landscapes and portraits. He died in 1751 at Amsterdam. He is well known as painter of the famous Petronella Oortman's Dollhouse.
