= Under the Skin (novel) =

2000 novel by Michel Faber

- First edition cover art
- Author: Michel Faber
- Genre: Science fiction
- Publisher: Harcourt; Canongate Books
- Publication date: 2000
- Publication place: United Kingdom
- Media type: Print
- Pages: 304
- ISBN: 0-15-100626-1
- OCLC: 042475638

Under the Skin is a 2000 science fiction novel by Michel Faber. Set on the coast in north-central Scotland, it traces an alien who, assuming human form, drives around the countryside picking up male hitchhikers whom she drugs and delivers to her home planet. The novel, which was Faber's debut, was shortlisted for the 2000 Whitbread Award. It was later loosely adapted into a 2013 film of the same name directed by Jonathan Glazer.

== Summary ==
Isserley is an extraterrestrial sent by a rich corporation on her planet to Earth to kidnap unwary hitchhikers. She drugs them and delivers them to her compatriots, who mutilate and fatten her victims so that they can be turned into meat, as human meat (called voddissin) is a very expensive delicacy on the aliens' barren homeworld. Humans are referred to as Vodsels by the extraterrestrial beings (voedsel means "food" in Dutch).

== Plot ==
The novel begins with Isserley picking up hitchhikers on the A9 in Scotland. Gradually, it is revealed she is an alien, originally somewhere between a fox and primate in form, who has been surgically altered to look like a human woman, thus suffering constant pains. She takes her job seriously and considers herself a valuable professional. Isserley has an orderly system for appraising vodsel to potentially capture. At the same time, she is spiteful of what she considers her deformed body made so for the job. The only other of her kind to undergo similar surgery to look like Homo sapiens is her direct superior, Esswis.

Isserley spends her spare time walking on the pebbled beach by her cottage, marveling at the beauty of Earth compared to her home world, where most beings are forced to live and toil underground and the wealthy Elite live on the surface but are still unable to tolerate being outside. Sometimes she admires wandering sheep, as they remind her of children at home and she considers the non-bipeds anthropomorphic because they share traits with her own species. Isserley considers herself and her people the "human beings", and the "Homo sapiens" of Earth animals for farming. Amlis Vess, the son of her employer, visits the farm and sets four of their captives free. In response, Isserley and Esswis hunt down and shoot them. Later, when visiting the pens where the captives are fattened, one writes "mercy" in the dirt in front of Isserly and Amlis Vess. Isserley pretends to not speak English, hoping to keep hidden from Vess the extent of their language capabilities.

Eventually, she is sexually assaulted by a hitchhiker and is forced to kill him and leave his body. The experience shakes her, and she captures the next hitchhiker without interviewing him to assess the risk, failing to discover that she actually shares many inner thoughts with him as well as the fact he would be missed by family (usually a key factor in aborting capture). In anger, she demands to see what happens to the vodsel during "processing", where she watches as his tongue is cut out and he is castrated. Due to her claustrophobia of the subterranean structure, she has never seen this and is shocked and disappointed at how fast it goes. She insists on seeing one actually slaughtered but becomes hysterical during the process.

Isserley is calmed down by Amlis, himself an Elite, whose beliefs are that vodsel should not be consumed, suggesting they are more similar to him and Isserley than she admits. After he departs to their home world to share with their people what he had witnessed (the beauty of Earth, the treatment of vodsel), Isserley's attitude changes. She begins to doubt her job and is especially nonplussed after learning that others are more than willing to take her place. She captures one last victim but feels guilty for doing so knowing that his dog has been left trapped in his van. Returning to where she found him, she frees the dog from the hitchhiker's van.

Isserley decides to quit and not return to the base of operations. She is forced to pick up one last hitchhiker, a man who insists on needing a ride to see his girlfriend give birth and mentions reincarnation on the way. Driving faster than usual, Isserley gets into a car accident. Isserley's body is essentially ruined while the hitchhiker is thrown through the window. Isserley ponders what will happen to her body as she must activate an explosive that will destroy all evidence of her and the crash. She thinks her atoms and particles will become dispersed in the environment and air. At peace with this thought, she hits the switch to activate the explosive.

== Themes ==
The novel is darkly satirical. Its themes include sexism, big business, factory farming, animal cruelty and experimentation, environmental decay, class politics, rape, and treatment of and attitudes toward immigrants. It reflects on more personal questions of sexual identity, humanity, snobbery, and mercy. The work also challenges the idea of an objective humanity, the balance between darkness/pessimism and optimism/transcendence, and the treatment of unsuccessful members of society (unemployed, unattractive, dysfunctional, marginalized) and their roles.

== Reception ==
The Guardian reviewed the book and said "the real triumph is Faber's restrained, almost opaque prose. This is a man who could give Conrad a run at writing the perfect sentence." However, they wrote, "finally, having utterly convinced us of his alien narrator and persuaded us to go along for the ride for nearly 300 pages, Faber doesn't quite know where to go: the miniaturist aims at a big metaphysical moment. Metaphysics are fine, but you can't feed a family on them. Still, the journey alone is worthwhile."

== Film adaptation ==
The book was loosely adapted into a 2013 film of the same name, directed by Jonathan Glazer with Scarlett Johansson as the main character. "It's interesting to see the aspects of Isserley and her experience that Glazer retained, those he left behind, and those that perhaps remain as echoes," writes author Maureen Foster in a book about the film. For Laura (Isserley in the novel) there is no car crash but she does die in flames, and we see "her body burning, and a shot of plumes of dark smoke that dissipate into the sky," an echo of Isserley who "wonders where she will go: 'She would become part of the sky... Her invisible remains would combine, over time, with all the wonders under the sun.'" "Laura is a product of a cinematic vision; Isserley, a literary one."

== See also ==
- "To Serve Man" by Damon Knight, a similar story of animalistic aliens preying on humans
- Bad Taste by Peter Jackson, a comedy/horror movie with aliens hiding in rural New Zealand as they farm humans for fast food
