= Michel Faber =

Dutch writer

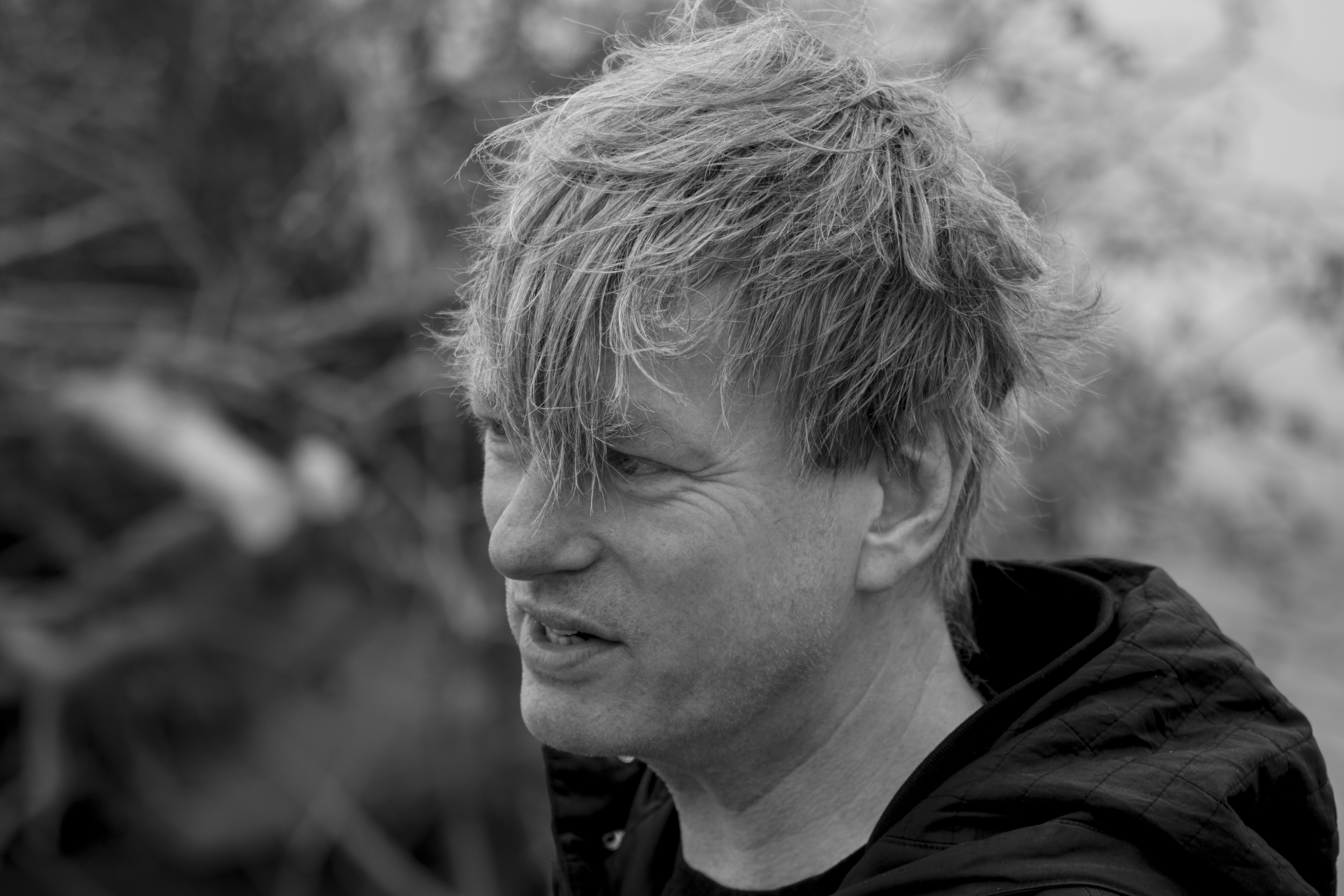
- Michel Faber at HeadRead festival, Estonia, in 2019
- Born: 13 April 1960 (age 66); The Hague, Netherlands
- Citizenship: Naturalized British (since 1993)
- Education: University of Melbourne
- Occupations: Novelist, poet, journalist
- Writing career
- Period: 1998–present
- Genres: Poetry, fiction
- Notable works: The Crimson Petal and the White, Under the Skin, The Book of Strange New Things, LISTEN: On Music, Sound and Us

Michel Faber (born 13 April 1960) is a Dutch-born writer of English-language fiction, including his 2002 novel The Crimson Petal and the White, and Under the Skin (2000) which was adapted for film by Jonathan Glazer, starring Scarlett Johansson. His novel for young adults, D: A Tale of Two Worlds, was published in 2020. His book, Listen: On Music, Sound and Us, a non-fiction work about music, came out in October 2023.

== Life ==
Faber was born in The Hague, Netherlands. He and his parents immigrated to Australia in 1967. He attended primary and secondary school in the Melbourne suburbs of Boronia and Bayswater, then attended the University of Melbourne, studying Dutch, Philosophy, Rhetoric, English Language (a course involving translation and criticism of Anglo-Saxon and Middle English texts) and English Literature. He graduated in 1980. He worked as a cleaner and at various other casual jobs, before training as a nurse at Marrickville and Western Suburbs hospitals in Sydney. He nursed until the mid-1990s. In 1993 he, his second wife and family immigrated to Scotland. Faber's second wife Eva died of cancer in July 2014 and he published a poetry collection, Undying, about this event in 2016. A biography of Faber by Rodge Glass, Michel Faber: The Writer and his Work, came out in 2023 (Liverpool University Press).

== Work ==
=== Fiction ===
Faber wrote seriously from the age of fourteen, but did not submit his manuscripts for publication. Many of the short stories that appeared in his debut collection, as well as earlier drafts of The Crimson Petal and the White, were completed during the 1980s and stored away. Another novel completed in this period, A Photograph of Jesus, remains unissued. During the 1990s, with the encouragement of his wife, Eva, Faber began entering – and winning – short story competitions. This led to him being approached by the Edinburgh-based publishers Canongate Books, who have published his work in the UK ever since.

Faber's first published book was a collection of short stories, Some Rain Must Fall, issued in 1998. Of these stories, the title piece had won the Ian St James Award in 1996, "Fish" had won the Macallan Prize in 1996, and "Half a Million Pounds and a Miracle" had won the Neil Gunn Award in 1997.

The first of Faber's novels to be published was Under the Skin (2000), written in, and inspired by, the Scottish Highlands. Like much of Faber's work, it defies easy categorisation, combining elements of the science fiction, horror and thriller genres. It was translated into many languages (17 by 2004), as well as being shortlisted for the Whitbread First Novel Award.

Faber's second published novel was The Hundred and Ninety-Nine Steps (2001), set in Whitby. The original hardback edition included digitally manipulated colour photographs; these were absent from subsequent reissues. Radically different from Under The Skin in tone and theme, The Hundred and Ninety-Nine Steps attracted mixed reviews.

Faber's third published novel was The Courage Consort (2002), about an a cappella vocal group rehearsing a piece of avant-garde music.

In 2002, Faber's 850-page The Crimson Petal and the White was published. Set in 1870s London and principally concerning a 19-year-old prostitute called Sugar, it was described by some critics as postmodern while others echoed the assertion (made in an early review) that it was "the novel that Dickens might have written had he been allowed to speak freely".

Faber's second collection of short stories The Fahrenheit Twins was published in 2005. Its opening story, "The Safehouse", won second place in the inaugural National Short Story Prize (since renamed the BBC National Short Story Award) in 2005.

The Crimson Petal and the White is his most popular work, but Faber chose never to write a sequel to his Victorian novel. However, he did write a number of short stories featuring characters from The Crimson Petal and the White, in scenarios that pre-dated or post-dated the events of the novel. While not a sequel (the novel's controversial ending was allowed to remain definitive and the fates of the heroines Sugar and Agnes were left undisclosed), the stories offered additional perspectives on some of the characters' past and future lives. Issued first in Italy, by Faber's long-term Italian publishers Einaudi, the stories were issued by Canongate in 2006, as The Apple.

"Bye Bye Natalia", Faber's short story following his 2004 visit to Ukraine (see "Journalism" below), was eventually published in the July 2006 edition of Granta and then chosen for inclusion in the 2008 edition of The O. Henry Prize Stories, an annual anthology dedicated to writers who are deemed to have made "a major contribution to the art of the short story".

Faber's novel The Fire Gospel was published in 2008 as part of the Canongate Myth Series. Inspired by the myth of Prometheus, it tells the story of a scholar of Aramaic called Theo, who steals an ancient 'gospel' describing the death of Jesus, from a bombed museum in Iraq. The book gently satirizes the publishing industry.

In 2009, he donated the short story "Walking After Midnight" to Oxfam's 'Ox-Tales' project, four collections of UK stories written by 38 authors. His story was published in the Water collection.

Faber's sixth novel, The Book of Strange New Things, was published in 2014. The novel tells the story of a British missionary to an alien world. After its publication, Faber announced that he would retire from writing novels for adults. In an interview at Waterstones Trafalgar Square, Faber said "I think I have written the things I was put on earth to write. I think I've reached the limit". In June 2015 The Book of Strange New Things was named a Book of the Year by the magazine World. In 2017, Amazon Video released the pilot of a TV adaptation, as Oasis.

His novel for children, D: A Tale of Two Worlds, was published in 2020.

LISTEN: On Music, Sound and Us, a non-fiction quasi-anthropological work about music, tribalism, and human community was published by Canongate in October 2023.

=== Journalism ===
In the years 2001 to 2004, Faber reviewed books for the Scotland on Sunday newspaper. Throughout 2004, he wrote a regular feature for The Sunday Herald called "Image Conscious", analysing the layers of meaning, intent and association in various photographs. Since 2003, he has reviewed for The Guardian, mainly choosing foreign fiction in translation, short story collections, graphic novels and books about music.

In 2004, as part of the Authors on the Frontline project, Faber travelled to Ukraine with Médecins Sans Frontières, to witness MSF's intervention in the HIV/AIDS epidemic there. Faber wrote an article for The Sunday Times, published in January 2005.

In 2006, Faber contributed an essay, "Dreams in the Dumpster, Language Down the Drain", to Not One More Death (Verso/Stop The War Coalition), a collection of pieces examining US and UK involvement in the Iraq War.

In 2019, he contributed a piece to A Love Letter To Europe, an anthology of pieces expressing affection for Europe at the time of imminent Brexit.

== Adaptations ==
A four-part television adaptation of The Crimson Petal and the White, produced by the BBC in 2011, starred Romola Garai, Chris O'Dowd, Richard E. Grant and Gillian Anderson.

The Courage Consort has been adapted for radio twice, by the BBC in the UK and ABC Australia.

Under the Skin was adapted into a film, directed by Jonathan Glazer and starring Scarlett Johansson. It premièred at the Venice Film Festival on 3 September 2013.

The Book of Strange New Things was adapted as ten 15-minute episodes for BBC Radio 4 in 2014, and as a pilot for an Amazon Prime TV Series called Oasis.

== Bibliography ==
=== Novels ===
- Under the Skin (2000)
- The Hundred and Ninety-Nine Steps (2001)
- The Courage Consort (2002)
- The Crimson Petal and the White (2002)
- The Fire Gospel (2008)
- The Book of Strange New Things (2014)
- D: A Tale of Two Worlds (2020)

=== Short fiction ===
- Some Rain Must Fall (1998)
- The Fahrenheit Twins (2005) also published (without the titular story) as Vanilla Bright Like Eminem
- Bye-Bye Natalia (2006) collected in Granta 94 – On the Road Again: Where Travel Writing Went Next
- The Apple: New Crimson Petal Stories (2006)
- Walking After Midnight (2009) collected in Ox-Tales: Water

=== Poetry ===
- Undying (2016)

=== Non-fiction ===
- Dreams in the Dumpster, Language Down the Drain (2006) collected in Not One More Death
- LISTEN: On Music, Sound and Us (2023)
