= Thomas Bertram =

Tom Bertram
- Mansfield Park character

In-universe information
- Full name: Tom Bertram
- Family: Sir Thomas Bertram and Lady Maria Bertram
- Relatives: Edmund Bertram, Maria Bertram, and Julia Bertram
- Home: Mansfield Park, but he often travels and stays with friends and acquaintances

Tom Bertram is a supporting character in Jane Austen's 1814 novel, Mansfield Park. He is the elder son and heir of Sir Thomas Bertram, a baronet and wealthy landowner in Northamptonshire, who also owns an estate in Antigua.

== Character ==
As a seventeen-year-old, Tom Bertram is not particularly kind to his cousin Fanny Price, the poor ward of his parents who has come to live with his family. Once grown up, he is depicted as a person who is only interested in amusing himself and is careless and extravagant with money.

=== Prodigal son ===
Austen's writing is influenced by many sources. Tom's character has much in common with the biblical Prodigal, though he is the elder rather than younger son, and the portion of inheritance he wastes is not his own but his brother's. Barbara Hayley says that Tom's vices spring from being the elder brother and heir, and 'that without effort or worth on his part, the family's house, estate and money are destined for him'. Sir Thomas has to sell the living of the local parish to pay off Tom's debts. This harms the prospects of his younger brother Edmund, who intends to become a clergyman and would be expecting an income from the tithes of the parish. Edmund never expresses any resentment.

Tom expresses 'repentance' on two occasions. Sir Thomas rightly suspects the first repentance to be superficial and removes Tom from the influence of his friends by taking him on a business trip to Antigua for a year. Tom's removal is also beneficial to the estate since the more reliable Edmund attends to its management.

The second repentance comes near the end of the novel when Tom has a 'fall', both literal and spiritual, at the Newmarket Easter races and, being close to death, sends word to bring him home. Edmund is the one to bring him back. On both occasions of repentance, Sir Thomas is a welcoming father, an attitude not extended to the adulterous Maria, though Maria never wants to return home.

=== Social skills ===
Tom is good at entertaining, but only after his second repentance does he begin to develop a sense of responsibility. Paula Byrne describes Tom as one of the most intriguing characters in Austen's fictional world. He loves theatre and dressing up and is very close to the dandyish Yates. He is not very good at understanding women and the social customs of courtship, and there is no indication that he ever marries. She suggests that If there is a homosexual character in any of Austen's novels, then it is Tom Bertram.

== Travel and return ==
Tom and his father go to Antigua to deal with problems on his estate. After a year, Tom is sent back home and returns to his former friends and his travels around the country. Two wealthy young people, Henry and Mary Crawford move into the area and are living in the parsonage with their half sister, Mrs Grant wife of the new clergyman. Mary is tentatively romantically interested in Tom but he does not respond to her; she shifts her attentions to his younger brother, Edmund.

Tom leaves home again to spend time with his friends at Weymouth. Weymouth had become one of the first modern tourist destinations and had been made popular by the royal family and their hangers-on. It had a reputation as a raffish seaside resort and is the offstage backdrop for Tom Bertram's disastrous meeting with John Yates, who later elopes with Tom's sister, Julia.

=== Theatre ===
When Tom returns to Mansfield Park, he is soon joined by Mr Yates. They want to put on an amateur production of a play that is somewhat risque. Edmund and Fanny are opposed but the rest of the group are excited. Tom arranges for a theatre to be built in the billiard room. Austen carefully distinguishes between the fashionable elite theatricals of the aristocracy, which were mercilessly lampooned by the press, and the more modest efforts of the gentry. Georgian debates about whether amateur acting was a virtuous activity or its opposite were lively, and Austen uses this to create the drama. An enthusiastic theatre-goer, she displays accurate knowledge of how acting companies really worked. Tom Bertram is both actor and company manager, as was the case on the professional stage.

The play is almost ready for production when Sir Thomas returns unexpectedly early and puts a stop to the proceedings. Barbara Hayley points out that while Tom shows considerable force of character in instigating and carrying through his plans and overcoming Edmund's objections, he never shows any sign of helping his father with either estate or business.

Josephine Ross says that Austen's experience of hearing her brothers declaim poetry must be reflected in Tom Bertram's reminiscence, 'I am sure my name was Norval, every evening of my life, through one Christmas holidays', a reference to his childhood recitations from the popular eighteenth-century play Douglas, by John Home.

=== Easter 'fall' ===
Later in the novel, Tom leaves again to take part in a horse racing meet at Newmarket but has a fall and is injured which, combined with his drinking, causes him to become very ill. His friends abandon him and Edmund has to fetch him home to be nursed back to health. His illness causes his family to fear for his life. This is observed with interest by Mary Crawford, who wants to marry Edmund. If Tom should die, that would leave Edmund as the heir to the Bertram estates and title. During his illness, Tom learns to suffer and to think and develops into a more prudent man. Barbara Hayley points out that we never see this improvement at first hand and 'it is not at all like the Tom we know'.

== Portrayal ==
- Giles Ashton as the young Tom and Christopher Villiers as the grown Tom in the 1983 BBC drama serial Mansfield Park.
- James Purefoy in the 1999 film Mansfield Park.
- Zachary Elliott-Hatton as the young Tom and James D'Arcy as the grown Tom in the 2007 ITV production aired as The Complete Jane Austen (Mansfield Park (2007 TV drama)).
