= Mansfield Park (1983 serial) =

1983 British television drama series

- Genre: Drama
- Based on: Mansfield Park by Jane Austen
- Written by: Kenneth Taylor
- Directed by: David Giles
- Starring: Sylvestra Le Touzel; Christopher Villiers; Nicholas Farrell; Samantha Bond; Bernard Hepton; Angela Pleasence; Anna Massey; Jonny Lee Miller; Jackie Smith-Wood; Gorden Kaye
- Composer: Derek Bourgeois
- Country of origin: United Kingdom
- Original language: English
- No. of series: 1
- No. of episodes: 6

Production
- Producer: Betty Willingale
- Running time: 317 minutes in six episodes
- Production company: Lionheart Television International

Original release
- Network: BBC2
- Release: 6 November – 11 December 1983

Mansfield Park is a 1983 British six-part television drama serial, made by the BBC, and adapted from Jane Austen's 1814 novel of the same name. The serial was the first screen adaptation of the novel. Unlike Patricia Rozema's 1999 film, it is faithful to Jane Austen's novel. Jonny Lee Miller, who has a small role as Charles Price in this serial, played Edmund Bertram in Rozema's adaptation.

Set, like all her novels, in contemporary England, Jane Austen's tale of virtue and vice centres on young and impoverished Fanny Price who arrives at the elegant country estate of her uncle, Sir Thomas Bertram. Snubbed by everyone except her cousin Edmund, Fanny begins her long struggle for acceptance by her snobbish relations, who believe wealth automatically means quality. Although Fanny finally wins some respect from the Bertrams, she incurs the displeasure of her uncle by rejecting a marriage proposal from handsome philanderer Henry Crawford because she sees through Crawford's veneer and is unwilling to marry such an unprincipled man. After a period spent at the home of her parents and siblings in Portsmouth, she returns to Mansfield Park because of unfortunate events affecting the Bertram family, and through her support for the family and her adherence to moral principles, her worth is recognised.

== Cast ==
- Katie Durham-Matthews – Young Fanny
- Sylvestra Le Touzel – Fanny Price
- Christopher Villiers – Tom Bertram
- Giles Ashton – Young Tom
- Nicholas Farrell – Edmund Bertram
- Alex Lowe – Young Edmund
- Samantha Bond – Maria Bertram
- Alys Wallbank – Young Maria
- Liz Crowther – Julia Bertram
- Sharon Beare – Young Julia
- Bernard Hepton – Sir Thomas Bertram
- Angela Pleasence – Lady Bertram
- Gillian Martell – Mrs Rushworth
- Jonathan Stephens – Mr Rushworth
- Anna Massey – Mrs Norris
- Peter Finn – Mr Norris
- Robert Burbage – Henry Crawford
- Jackie Smith-Wood – Mary Crawford
- Gorden Kaye – Dr Grant
- Susan Edmonstone – Mrs Grant
- Robin Langford – Mr Yates
- Kenneth Hage – Fiddler
- Allan Hendrick – William Price
- Luke Healy – Young William Price
- Alison Fiske – Mrs Price
- David Buck – Mr Price
- Eryl Maynard – Susan Price
- Claire Simmons – Betsey Price
- Paul Davies-Prowells – Sam Price
- James Campbell – Tom Price
- Jonny Lee Miller – Charles Price
- Vivienne Moore – Rebecca
- Neville Phillips – Baddely
- Norman Mann – Jenkins
- Paul Doust – Curate
- "Snuff" – Pug

== Crew ==
- Derek Bourgeois – Composed and conducted music
- Marion McDougall, Anthony Smith – Production Managers
- Sheelagh Reese – Production Associate
- Yvonne Collins, Sally Dean – Production Assistants
- David Mason, Paul Carney – Assistant Floor Managers
- Peter Netley – Graphic Designer
- Sally Clements – Properties Buyer
- Roger Neal – Vision Control Supervisor
- John Barclay – Vision Mixer
- Trevor Wimlett, Chris Wickham – Cameramen
- Geoff Higgs – Engineering Manager
- Stan Pow – Video-tape Editor
- Daphne Croker – Makeup Designer
- Ian Adley – Costume Designer
- Robin Luxford – Sound
- Bert Robinson – Lighting
- John Bone – Designer
- Betty Willingale – Producer
- David Giles – Director
- John and Mary Holmes – Trained Pug
