= Edmund Bertram =

Fictional character

- Mansfield Park character
- Blake Ritson starring as Edmund Bertram in the television film Mansfield Park (2007)
- Portrayed by: see below

In-universe information
- Gender: Male
- Family: Sir Thomas Bertram and Lady Maria Bertram
- Relatives: Maria Bertram, Julia, and Thomas Bertram
- Home: Mansfield Park

Edmund Bertram is a lead character in Jane Austen's 1814 novel Mansfield Park. He is Sir Thomas's second son and plans to be ordained as a clergyman. He falls in love with Mary Crawford who constantly challenges his vocation. Edmund goes ahead with ordination. At the end of the novel he marries Fanny Price.

== Character ==
Thomas Edwards regards Edmund as the most believable of Austen's heroes, not least because she allows the reader to have reservations about him. He has reality but also limitations. Edmund is a naturally kind and compassionate person, as demonstrated by his attitude towards Fanny Price, his impoverished young cousin who has come to live with Edmund's family from her home and family in Portsmouth. It is the sixteen year old Edmund who first takes pity on Fanny, first sees that she is clever and first develops her mind. Edmund's kindness and generosity to Fanny distinguishes him from the rest of his family, who tend to exploit Fanny's good nature or mock her.

Edmund's ironic description of himself is that "... there is not the least wit in my nature. I am a very matter-of-fact, plain-spoken being, and may blunder on the borders of a repartee for half an hour together without striking it out".

== The master leaves ==
Edmund's father, Sir Thomas Bertram, is the master of Mansfield Park. After the Rev Mr Norris, Edmund's uncle dies, the living of the Mansfield parish is kept for him until he is old enough (twenty-four) to be ordained. This plan is undermined when Edmund's older brother Tom accumulates such large gambling debts that his father has to sell the living to a Dr Grant to settle his accounts. Another parish, ten miles away at Thornton Lacey, is still promised to Edmund. Dr. Grant and his wife move into Mansfield parsonage.

Sir Thomas goes to Antigua to settle problems with his Caribbean estate; he takes Tom with him and leaves Edmund in charge of the English household. Edmund's sisters, Maria and Julia, are pleased their father has gone and enjoy a new sense of freedom. After a year, Tom is sent back to England but amuses himself by visiting friends and taking part in horse racing. Edmund still seems to be in charge of the estate. Mrs. Grant's young half-sister, Mary Crawford comes to live with her and she is accompanied by her brother, Henry Crawford. Edmund becomes an admirer of Mary and inadvertently neglects Fanny.

=== Ordination under attack ===
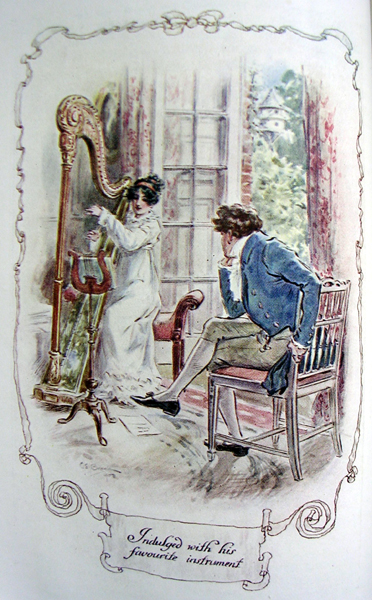
Mary plays the harp for Edmund each morning at Mansfield parsonage

Lionel Trilling believed, based on a letter Austen sent in 1813 to her sister, Cassandra, that Austen had chosen ordination as the subject for Mansfield Park. Paula Byrne argues (as do others) that this is based on a misreading of the letter, although, she says, there is no doubt that Edmund's vocation is at the centre of the novel.

During a family visit to Mr Rushworth's estate at Sotherton Court, the young people are shown into the family chapel. Mary applauds the late Mr Rushworth's decision to abandon the twice daily prayers, eloquently describing such practice as an imposition for both family and servants. Edmund acknowledges from his own experience that long services can be boring but maintains that, without self-discipline, a private spirituality will be insufficient for moral development. She then overhears some family banter about Maria's intended marriage to Mr Rushworth and learns for the first time of Edmund's intention to become a clergyman. Mary is embarrassed about her previous remarks but also shocked. Importantly for the novel, her presence and her voice become a constant assault on Edmund's vocation.

Mary also attacks Edmund's expectation of a living, one based on privilege rather than on merit. Sir Thomas still offers him a guaranteed living at Thornton Lacey where he can lead the life of a country gentleman. Edmund's defence of the widespread practice of patronage is backed up by Fanny. His argument has well developed logic but lacks a robust spirituality. Says Barbara Hayley, "Despite all temptations, Edmund never loses sight of his duty as a clergyman, taking an unusually dedicated and spiritual view of it."

=== Garden of delights ===
Illicit misconduct and sexual temptation are suggested by Austen from the moment the young people reach a door of the house, 'temptingly open on a flight of steps which led immediately to... all the sweets of pleasure-grounds, [and] as by one impulse, one wish for air and liberty, all walked out'. They soon find themselves in the wooded area known as the wilderness.

Juliet McMaster argues that Austen often used understatement, and that her characters disguise hidden powerful emotions behind apparently banal behaviour and dialogue. This is evident as Edmund, Mary and Fanny debate the merits of an ecclesiastical career. Though the exchanges are light-hearted, the issues are serious. To press her point, Austen has set the scene in the wilderness where their serpentine walk provides echoes of Spencer's, The Faerie Queene, and the "sepentining" pathways of the Wandering Wood. Spencer's 'Redcrosse Knight' (the novice knight who symbolises both England and Christian faith) is lost within the dangerous and confusing Wandering Wood. The knight nearly abandons Una, his true love, for Duessa, the seductive witch. So too, Edmund (the would-be Church of England minister) is trapped with the seductive Mary within the moral maze of Sotherton's wilderness and becomes neglectful of pious Fanny.

Edmund's resolve is put to an almost Biblical test. Mary's aim is that his desire for her will overcome his desire for ordination. Austen, unlike many of her contemporary writers, almost never quotes from the Bible; yet biblical themes-themselves are not difficult to find. The 'wilderness' experience contains hints of the Garden of Eden in Genesis, the wilderness wanderings of the Israelites in Exodus and of the temptation of Jesus in the Gospels. Mary, like her brother, fulfils the serpent's subtle role as she offers moral shortcuts to fulfilment and happiness.

Mary's strategies to dissuade Edmund from his ministry range from gentle persuasion – 'You really are fit for something better. Come, do change your mind. It is not too late. Go into the law' – to cruel attempts to emasculate him: 'Men love to distinguish themselves, and in either of the other lines [army or law], distinction may be gained, but not in the church. A clergyman is nothing'.

Thomas Edwards describes Mary's charming 'femininity' as full of innuendos which Edmund resists with blundering logic. McMaster comments on Austen's restrained eroticism. When Fanny is tired, Edmund takes her arm to provide support but when Mary extends him her arm, he expresses amazement at its lightness. He "registers, and within the bounds of polite converse, expresses the thrill he feels at this physical contact with Mary". McMaster contrasts this with that of Austen's critic, D. H. Lawrence, who provides loving descriptions of "that exquisite and immortal moment of a man's entry into the woman of his desire".

One evening at Mansfield Park, news comes that Sir Thomas is planning to return earlier than expected. Mary's thoughts return to Edmund's ordination and she challenges him about the corruption of the clergy, declaring the profession unworthy, filled only by lazy and gluttonous men like her brother-in-law, Dr Grant. 'His curate does all the work and the business of his own life is to dine'. Austen often exposed clergy corruption through parody. Mary's view of Regency clergy is widely confirmed by historians; Edmund's commitment to integrity and morality represents a minority vision.

=== Lover's Vows and the return of the master ===
When Tom settles on a plan for putting on the play, Lovers' Vows at Mansfield Park, both Edmund and Fanny are opposed. Austen's presentation of the intense debate about theatre tempts the reader to take sides and to miss the nuances. Edmund, the most critical voice, is actually an enthusiastic theatre-goer. Fanny, the moral conscience of the debate, "believed herself to derive as much innocent enjoyment from the play as any of them." She thought Henry the best actor of them all.

Edmund objects to the play, believing it somehow violates propriety, but fails to articulate the problem convincingly. His intense objection to an outsider being brought in to share in the theatricals is not easy for the modern reader to understand. Mr Rushworth's view that, "we are a great deal better employed, sitting comfortably here among ourselves, and doing nothing", is affirmed only by Sir Thomas himself. Sir Thomas is an intensely private person. Eventually, Edmund is persuaded that bringing in a person from another family would be worse than his participating in an intimate scene with Mary. Tom and Maria only feel 'glee' at the thought of the would-be clergyman acting in an improper play.

During rehearsals, Fanny observes the sexual tension and attraction between Edmund and Mary as they play the parts of Anhalt and Amelia, the two lovers. This fills her with misery but also jealousy. Some time later, Mary describes to Fanny her fondest memory at Mansfield Park when she played the dominant role with Edmund in a position of sexual submission. "I never knew such exquisite happiness ... Oh! it was sweet beyond expression."

Sir Thomas returns just before the play is due to be staged and is greatly displeased. Edmund admits his culpability and emphasises Fanny's constant opposition to the play.

== Exodus ==
Following Sir Thomas's return, there is a gradual exodus of the young people from Mansfield Park. Maria goes ahead with her marriage to Mr Rushworth and leaves for her honeymoon accompanied by Julia. Within a fortnight, Mary, who has been five months at the parsonage and now left alone, befriends Fanny. It is November.

=== The attack continues ===
Edmund still hopes that Mary will love him as he is, in his chosen occupation; Mary makes it clear that she will only marry him if he pursues a more lucrative and prestigious career. She continues her attack on his vocation and the church he represents. Edmund defends as best he can. During a lively discussion in the parsonage shrubbery that also includes Fanny, Mary recognises Edmund's worth and is attracted by his steadiness and integrity, but she cynically insists that there is no glamour in being 'honest and poor' – 'I have a much greater respect for those that are honest and rich'.

During a lively conversation in the Mansfield Park drawing room, Mary is reminded that Edmund's ordination is impending. She will not lower herself to marry a clergyman, in particular a clergyman with a serious vocation: 'It was plain that he could have no serious views, no true attachment, by fixing himself in a situation which he must know she would never stoop to'.

=== The ball ===
Edmund gives Fanny a necklace for the ball arranged at Mansfield Park for her benefit. At the same time Edmund shows how much his judgement has been blinded by his infatuation with Mary when he tells Fanny that in her and Mary Crawford's characters 'there is so much general resemblance in true generosity and natural delicacy'. The more reliable narrator has stated that Mary has none of Fanny's delicacy of taste, of mind, or of feeling.

After promising him the first two dances at the ball, Mary tells Edmund it will be the last time she will dance with him, because the next time they meet he will be ordained, and "she never has danced with a clergyman... and she never will". Edmund drops his decision to propose. The following day, 23 December, Edmund leaves for Peterborough and his ordination. Mary is upset but she still cannot cut herself off from Edmund. She recognises his quality, respects him, and is in love with him. Fanny believes, and the narrator states at the end of the novel, that Mary would have eventually altered her views and married Edmund if not for the scandal that ends up dividing them.

=== Departures and decline ===
Edmund stays on longer with his friends in Peterborough. Tom is away with his horse-loving friends. When Edmund eventually returns, he learns that Fanny has rejected a proposal from Henry. Still blinded by Henry's charisma, he tries to persuade her to reconsider.

Henry and Mary leave for London. Sir Thomas decides to send Fanny for a prolonged visit to her family's lowly home in Portsmouth, so that she can better appreciate the benefits of a marriage to Henry. When Tom becomes dangerously ill, Mary callously reflects that Edmund will inherit the baronetcy and estate if his brother dies. Dr and Mrs Grant depart for Westminster.

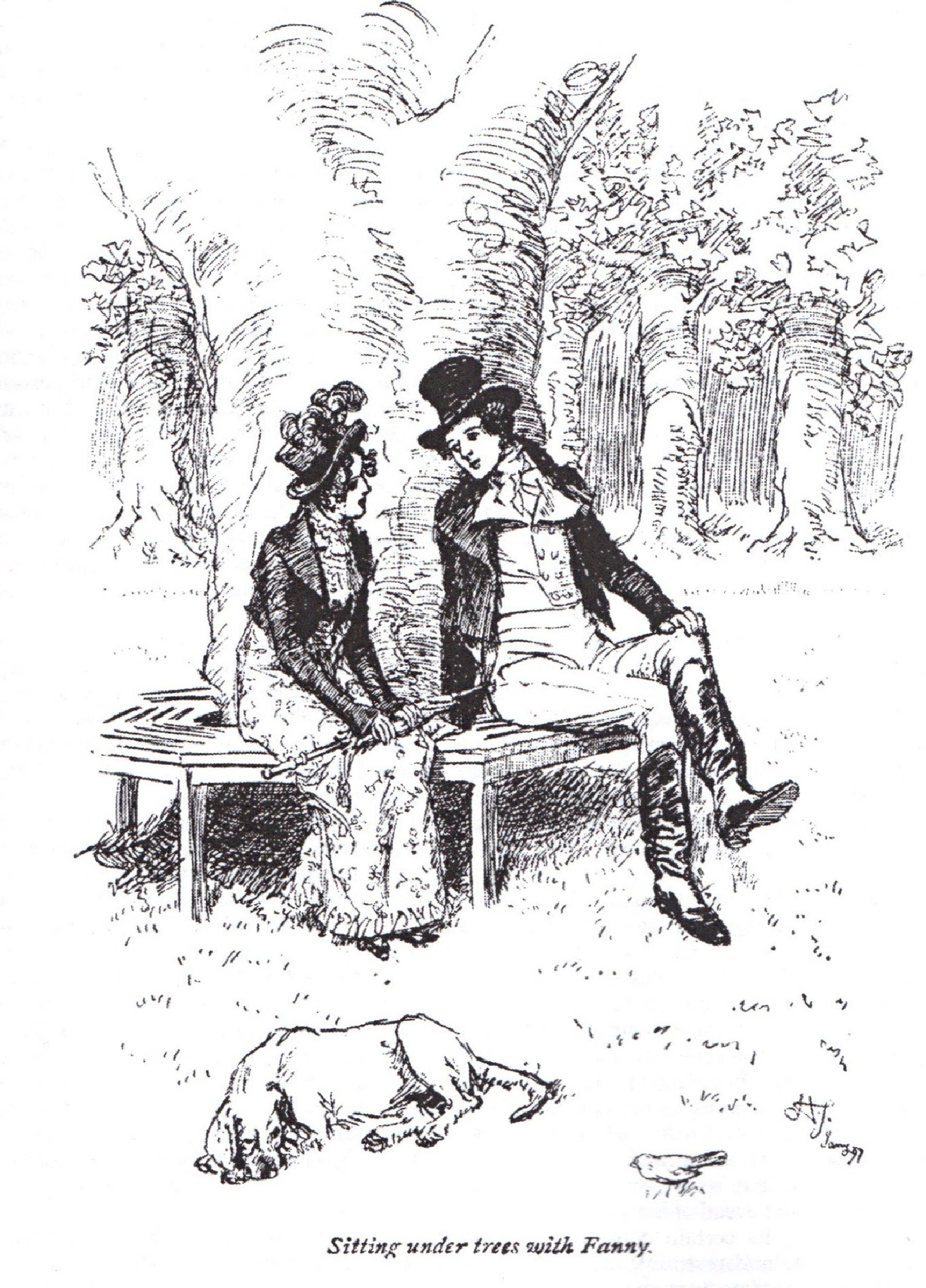
Edmund unburdens himself to Fanny

In London, Henry Crawford has an affair with Edmund's sister, Maria, who is now married to the wealthy-but-stupid Mr Rushworth. They run away together, bringing disgrace and embarrassment to the Bertrams. Edmund visits Mary in London and is affronted by her response to Henry and Maria's "folly"; rather than evincing moral disapproval, she feels that they have simply made imprudent decisions that have led to their being caught, and that Maria ought to continue living with Henry in order to persuade him to marry her and thus save their social standing. Edmund is disgusted by Mary's lack of moral outrage and concern for social standing, finally seeing past her charms. He tells her so and leaves, thus ending their attachment.

Edmund's reality and also his limitations are expressed when he reports to Fanny about his final distressing conversation with Mary and tries to sort out the truth from his personal bias. He is still conflicted, sad to 'close the door' on Mary forever. He gradually tells Fanny about his disillusionment with Mary over many days and she comforts him.

=== Restoration ===
Edmund's love for Fanny springs from 'a regard founded on the most endearing claims of innocence and helplessness'. Says Hayley, "Only after he has turned to her for comfort that this love comes to life. Their early relationship is reversed; he is the child, she the parent - his guide, comforter and friend."

Sir Thomas gives his approval to the marriage. Edmund has been given the parsonage at Thornton Lacey, and he and Fanny move there. After Dr Grant's death, the Mansfield parish is left available for Edmund and Fanny.

Juliet McMaster underlines the subtleties of Mansfield Park. She challenges the common criticism that it is unbelievable how quickly Edmund finally transfers his affections from Mary to Fanny. All along the 'subsurface movement' of the novel has been "Edmund's unconscious courtship of Fanny, which has been concurrent with his deliberate courtship of Mary". Austen herself, in the final chapter (which is essentially an epilogue) asks the reader to determine the time-scale for Edmund's dawning recognition of his love for Fanny.

== Portrayals ==
- Alex Lowe as the young Edmund and Nicholas Farrell as the grown Edmund in the 1983 British television drama serial Mansfield Park.
- Philip Sarson as the young Edmund and Jonny Lee Miller as the grown Edmund in the 1999 film Mansfield Park.
- Benedict Cumberbatch in the 2003 BBC Radio 4 adaptation.
- Blake Ritson in the 2007 BBC production aired as The Complete Jane Austen (Mansfield Park).
- Wesley Buckeridge in the 2014/15 YouTube Webseries From Mansfield with Love Produced by Foot in the Door Theatre
