= Mansfield Park (2007 film) =

2007 television film directed by Iain B. MacDonald

- DVD cover
- Genre: Drama; Romance
- Based on: Mansfield Park by Jane Austen
- Screenplay by: Maggie Wadey
- Directed by: Iain B. MacDonald
- Starring: Billie Piper; Michelle Ryan; Blake Ritson
- Theme music composer: John E. Keane
- Country of origin: United Kingdom
- Original language: English
- No. of episodes: 1

Production
- Producer: Suzan Harrison
- Cinematography: Nick Dance
- Editor: Melanie Oliver
- Running time: 90 minutes
- Production company: Company Pictures

Original release
- Network: ITV
- Release: 18 March 2007

Mansfield Park is a 2007 British television film directed by Iain B. MacDonald and starring Billie Piper, Michelle Ryan, and Blake Ritson. Adapted from Jane Austen's 1814 novel of the same name, the film is about Fanny Price, who is sent by her poor mother to live with wealthy relatives at their Mansfield estate. By the age of eighteen, Fanny is in love with her sensitive cousin who is studying to be a clergyman. Her feelings for him and her moral sense prevent her from accepting a marriage proposal from a much wealthier suitor.

Mansfield Park premiered on 18 March 2007 on the United Kingdom network ITV at 9:00 p.m., as part of The Jane Austen Season. It was filmed at Newby Hall, North Yorkshire, England. It made its TV debut in Canada on 23 December 2007 and in the United States on 27 January 2008. The drama ran for two hours (including advertisement breaks) in the United Kingdom, 90 minutes without the breaks.

== Cast ==
- Billie Piper as Fanny Price
- Michelle Ryan as Maria Bertram
- Blake Ritson as Edmund Bertram
- James D'Arcy as Thomas Bertram
- Catherine Steadman as Julia Bertram
- Jemma Redgrave as Lady Bertram
- Douglas Hodge as Sir Thomas Bertram
- Hayley Atwell as Mary Crawford
- Joseph Beattie as Henry Crawford
- Maggie O'Neill as Mrs. Norris
- Joseph Morgan as William Price
- Rory Kinnear as James Rushworth
- Julia Joyce as Young Fanny Price
- Lucy Hurst as Young Julia Bertram
- Tara Berwin as Young Maria Bertram

== Reception ==
For her performance, Piper received a nomination for Best Actress at the 2007 TV Quick and TV Choice Awards.

Writing for The Guardian, Kathryn Flett wrote of the adaptation "if you didn't mind your Austen both mucked about with and a little bit mucky—then it was all good fun, though I think Billie [Piper] may have avoided delving too deeply into the source material in favour of renting the 1996 adaptation of Emma, so uncannily like Gwyneth doing British did she sound."

Paula Byrne, in analysing the way the film industry deals with the works of Jane Austen, said "it remains to be seen whether it is possible for there to be a faithful dramatisation of Mansfield Park". In Fanny Price, Austen dared to portray a diffident, anxious heroine who nevertheless displays an iron will. Byrne argues that "In this regard, Fanny Price is the most interesting of Austen’s heroines and the one whom the conventions of modern cinema and television are least well qualified to serve". She concluded that the 2007 ITV adaptation of Mansfield Park failed "because even as fine an actor as Billie Piper failed to capture the simultaneous strength and weakness of Fanny Price".
