= The Browning Version =

The Browning Version may refer to:

- The Browning Version (play), Terence Rattigan's 1948 play
- The Browning Version (1951 film), starring Michael Redgrave
- The Browning Version (1994 film), starring Albert Finney
