= Mr. Rushworth =

James Rushworth
- Mansfield Park character
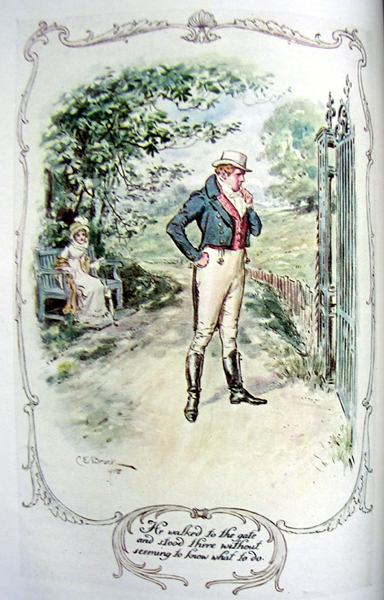

In-universe information
- Full name: James Rushworth
- Position: Owner
- Relatives: mother: Mrs Rushworth
- Home: Sotherton Court

Mr. James Rushworth is a character from Jane Austen's 1814 novel Mansfield Park. Mansfield Park is about a young girl, Fanny Price, who goes to live with her wealthy relatives, the Bertrams. The novel follows the familial life and social circle of the Bertrams. Rushworth is part of this circle. He is the son of Mrs. Rushworth and has inherited Sotherton Estate. He has 12,000 pounds a year, which makes him a very eligible bachelor. He is the fiance of Maria Bertram who is the eldest daughter of Sir Thomas Bertram. His dull-witted character is in parallel to another 'Austen' character, Mr William Collins, from Pride and Prejudice.

== Background ==
Jane Austen was born in December 1775 and died in July 1817. She was a British novelist who wrote six novels: Sense and Sensibility, Pride and Prejudice, Mansfield Park, Emma, Persuasion, and Northanger Abbey. Her novels are social satires of the rights and freedoms (or lack thereof) allowed women in Regency English society, and are written around the topics of love and marriage among the gentry.

Mansfield Park was written between 1811 and 1813 and was published in 1814. The novel was published in a second edition in 1816. The novel is about a young woman, Fanny Price, and her life with her relations, the Bertrams at their estate of Mansfield Park. It catalogues the events which occur there, and Fanny's insights into the characters and events.

Little is known by the reader about Rushworth before he comes into the company of the Bertrams. The only information given to us is that Rushworth is an eligible young bachelor who has recently come into a great fortune. The reader knows the estate features a large park of seven hundred acres and a Tudor mansion.

== Characterisation ==
Austen describes Mr. Rushworth as "a heavy young man, with not more than common sense". Mr. Rushworth is perceived by all the characters, with the exception of his mother, as a fool. He is described by Joseph Donohue Jr. as a "wealthy simpleton". Sir Thomas notes that he has no eye for business. He does not know how to act in society or what the appropriate behaviour is for most situations. He is "unaware and oblivious" to much of what goes on in Mansfield Park. Rushworth also has trouble learning and remembering his lines for Lovers' Vows, a play that the Bertrams and some friends want to perform. He is oblivious to the fact that his fiancee is indifferent to him and is flirting with Henry Crawford, although he does have some ill-feeling against Henry, stating that he is too short to be handsome.

== Relationship with Maria Bertram ==
Within the first few chapters of the novel, Mr. Rushworth becomes engaged to Maria Bertram. He notices how beautiful she is and soon fancies himself in love. However, since Sir Thomas Bertram is away in Antigua, Mr. Rushworth has to wait until he returns to marry Maria. When Sir Thomas does return, he notices that his daughter is indifferent to Mr. Rushworth and seems to prefer Henry Crawford. However, after Crawford leaves, Maria agrees to go ahead and marry Mr. Rushworth. Mr. Rushworth and his new bride go to live in Wimpole Street in London after their honeymoon in Brighton. In London they entertain high society and Maria is much pleased with being able to run her own house. However, Henry Crawford's charms once again affect her and she runs away with him. After this disgrace, Mr. Rushworth obtains a divorce from Maria, and it is presumed he will find someone else to marry.

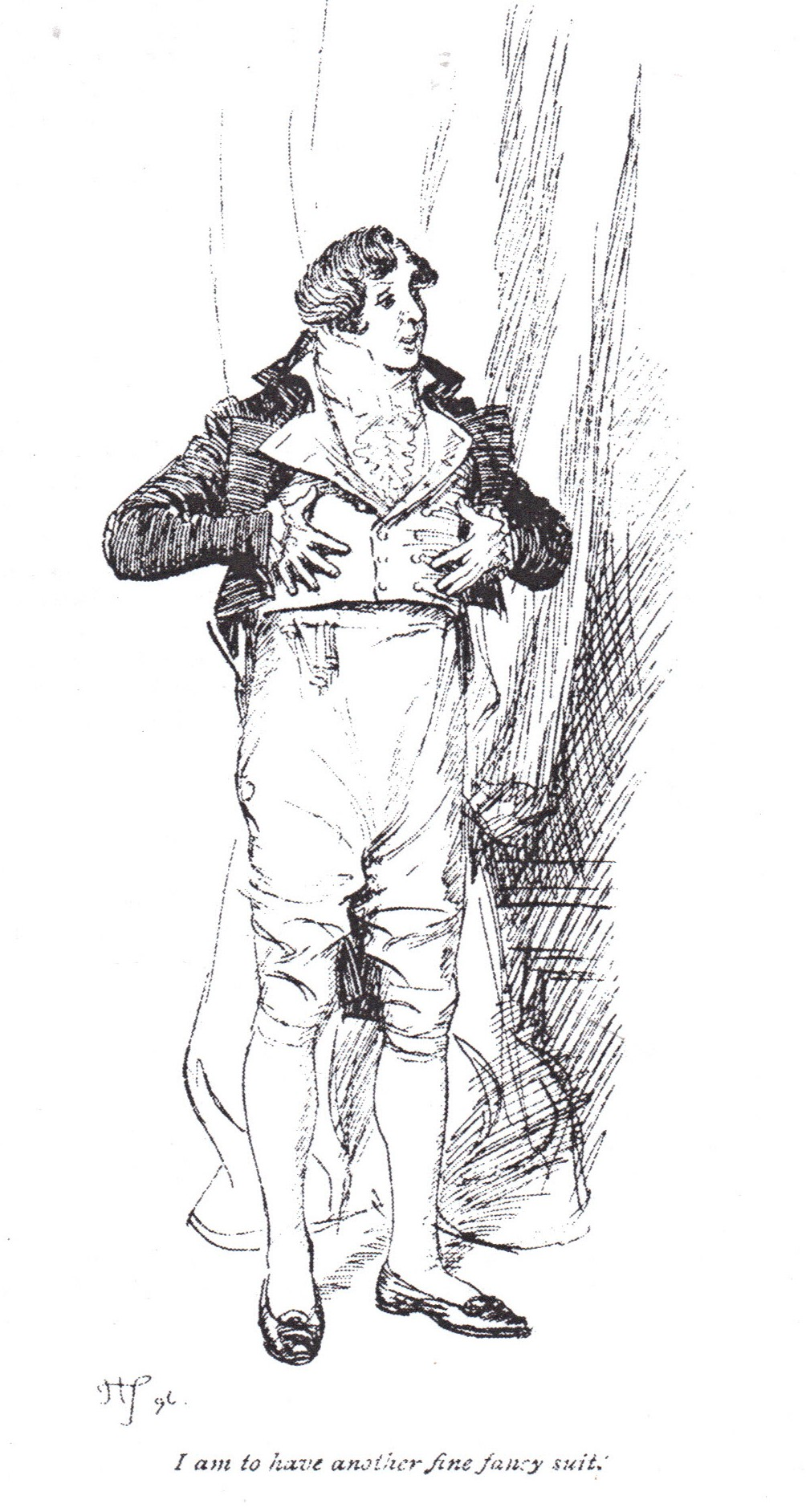
Thomson-MP-ch14

== Place in Plot ==
Mr. Rushworth plays a minor yet important role in the novel. After Mr. Rushworth gets engaged to Maria, he begins to think about improvements for his estate. He invites most of the Bertram household, as well as the Crawfords, to his estate to examine it and see what improvements can be made. As the party arrives at the house, he greets them with the utmost cordiality. When everyone goes outside, he is accompanied by Maria and Mr. Crawford. He runs off to go fetch the key for a locked gate, while Maria and Henry slip through and go off on their own. When Rushworth comes back, he isn't quite sure what to do; he does not know whether he should stay or go after them. He finally goes after him, but is not happy with what he finds. However, he perks up when Henry picks Julia to sit with him as they leave Sotherton. Mr. Rushworth takes part in the play Lovers' Vows, a controversial act in the Bertram household because Sir Thomas would never have allowed such frivolity to occur. However, he is too engaged in the finery which he is to wear to take note of what else is going on, specifically the flirtation of Maria and Henry. He has a lot of trouble learning his lines, and later he tells Sir Thomas that he thought the play was a bad idea to begin with.

== Portrayal in Movies ==
In the 1983 BBC mini-series of Mansfield Park, he is played by Jonathan Stephens. In the 1999 version of Mansfield Park, Mr. Rushworth is played by Hugh Bonneville. He is portrayed as a man of little sense who greatly cares about his social image. In the 2007 film of Mansfield Park, he is played by Rory Kinnear and is portrayed as a fool.

== Other Readings ==
- Laurie Kaplan, “The Rushworths of Wimpole Street”, 2011:
- Svenja Strohmeier, “Jane Austen’s Representation of Morality and Conduct in “Mansfield Park” and “Persuasion”, 2013:
- Wikipedia, Mansfield Park, 2014: Mansfield Park
