= Joseph Beattie =

English actor (born 1978)

- Born: 18 March 1978 (age 48); England
- Education: Guildhall School of Music and Drama
- Years active: 1994–present

Joseph Beattie (born 1978) is an English actor, known for portraying Malachi in the second season of Hex (2004) and Henry Crawford in Mansfield Park (2007).

== Background ==
Beattie attended King Alfred School in Hampstead and later trained at Guildhall School of Music and Drama. He is a former member of the National Youth Music Theatre.

== Career ==
Beattie made his film debut in The Browning Version (1994), and won a role in Velvet Goldmine (1998) while still at Guildhall. He has also appeared in the direct-to-video film Volcano: Nature Unleashed (also called Volcano or The Volcano Disaster), as Antonio, and Brideshead Revisited (2008), as Anthony Blanche.

On television, Beattie's first lead role was that of Flashman in the 2005 ITV adaptation of Tom Brown's Schooldays. His other television credits include Colditz, Malice Aforethought, Hex, Mansfield Park and Marple: A Pocket Full of Rye. He played Eric Visnjic in the television pilot Fast Track: No Limits, written by Lee Goldberg.

Beattie's stage work includes a Covent Garden Festival production of A Midsummer Night's Dream, playing Puck.

== Filmography ==
=== Television ===
Year	Show	Role	Notes
1998	Seesaw	Theo Price	Television film
2004	Holby City	Robert Pullman	TV Series:6 episodes (The Heart of the Matter, Baptism of Fire, Under Pressure, Pastures New, Past Caring and Night Fever)
2005	Tom Brown's Schooldays	Flashman	Television film
2005	Colditz	First Lieutenant Johnny Barnes	Television film
2005	Malice Aforethought	Denny Bourne	Television film
2005	Vincent	Ian Harper	TV Series:1 episodes
2005	Egypt	Charles Irby	TV Series:1 episodes (The Temple of the Sands)
2005	Hex	Malachi	Supernatural drama
2007	Mansfield Park	Henry Crawford	Television film
2009	Marple: A Pocket Full of Rye	Vivian Dubois	Television film
2013	Midsomer Murders	Scott Davenport	Television program Season 15, Episode 4 "Death and the Divas"
2013–2014	Borgia	Louis XII of France	TV series: season 2, 9 episodes
2014	Mr Selfridge	Mack Sennett	TV Series:1 episode
2019	EastEnders	Justin	TV Series:2 episodes
2020	Obsession: Dark Desires	George	TV Series:1 episode
2022	Hollyoaks	Jeremy	TV Series:6 episodes
2023	Silent Witness	Trevor Taylor	TV Series:2 episodes

=== Film ===
Year	Film	Role	Notes
1994	The Browning Version	Wilson	
1998	Velvet Goldmine	Cooper	
2005	Blood on Benefits		Short film
2008	Brideshead Revisited	Anthony Blanche	
2008	Fast Track: No Limits	Eric Visnjic	
2014	The Sleeping Room	Bill	
2024	The Magic Penguin	Duncan	
