= Tom Brown's Schooldays (2005 film) =

2005 UK drama television film

- Written by: Thomas Hughes; Ashley Pharoah
- Directed by: Dave Moore
- Starring: Alex Pettyfer; Stephen Fry
- Theme music composer: John E. Keane
- Country of origin: United Kingdom
- Original language: English

Production
- Producer: Charles Pattinson
- Cinematography: Ryszard Lenczewski
- Editor: Beverley Mills
- Running time: 93 minutes
- Production company: Company Pictures
- Budget: $10 million

Original release
- Network: ITV1
- Release: 1 January 2005

Tom Brown's Schooldays is a 2005 British television film directed by Dave Moore and starring Alex Pettyfer and Stephen Fry. It is an adaptation of the Thomas Hughes 1857 novel of the same name. It aired on ITV on 1 January 2005 and was released on DVD 9 days later.

== Plot ==
Tom Brown (Alex Pettyfer) is energetic, stubborn, kind-hearted, and athletic more than intellectual. He acts according to his feelings and the unwritten rules of the boys around him more than adults' rules.

The film deals with his years at the elite public school for boys Rugby School. His year starts when he goes to Rugby School, where he becomes acquainted with the adults and boys who live at the school and in its environs.

On his arrival, the 13-year-old Tom Brown is looked after by a more experienced classmate, Harry "Scud" East (Harry Michell). Soon after, Tom and East become the targets of a bully named Flashman (Joseph Beattie). The intensity of the bullying increases, and, after refusing to hand over a sweepstake ticket for the favourite in a horse race, Tom is deliberately burned in front of a fire. Tom and Scud stop Flashman's bullying when Flashman is expelled after a fight with Tom in which he used brass knuckles.

== Cast ==
- Alex Pettyfer as Tom Brown
- Stephen Fry as Dr. Thomas Arnold
- Dane Carter as Tadpole
- Harry Michell as Harry "Scud" East
- Joseph Beattie as Flashman
- Clive Standen as Brooke
- Jemma Redgrave as Mary Arnold
- Harry Smith as George Arthur
- Georgia Tennant as Sally

== Production ==
For scenes shot on location, all pupil roles that were not leads were played by real Rugby School students. The school all but ground to a halt for a fortnight as a large portion of the school grounds were used for shooting and the majority of male pupils were involved in taking part as extras. Several interior scenes were shot at Aldenham School in Hertfordshire, which was founded in 1597, a contemporary of Rugby.

Extensive cosmetic remodelling took place in some parts of the school so as to render the set historically accurate. For example, a convincing artificial well was constructed in the Old Quad where one had previously been but had since been demolished and bricked over. This particular prop remained at the school for nearly a year afterwards, as the film crew did not take it with them when they left.

The Old Gym, one of the longest standing school buildings, was sequestered as a base for costumes for the extras.

Stephen Fry interacted enthusiastically with the school during his time on set. He gave an almost universally attended talk to the entire school one evening, in which he, among other things, told the story of his expulsion from Uppingham School in 1972. Approximately ten select extras (pupils) were invited to talk to him at length in the Headmaster's study on another occasion.

== Differences from the novel ==
Event	Book	Film
How Tom starts	Sent by his father mid-term because of Tom's anxiety to go up to a public school.	At start of term.
Fights	An unorganized fight with Tom and East against Flashman. The "two against one" imbalance is compensated for by Flashman's being two years older and bigger. Later, an organized fight between Tom and "Slogger" Williams.	An organized fight between Tom and Flashman, not Tom and Williams, one against one. Tom almost wins but Flashman cheats by using brass knuckles.
Why Flashman is expelled	He gets very drunk in Brownsover and has to be helped back to school.	He gets the school matron's daughter pregnant, as well as the fight.
Result of Arthur's illness	Survived.	Died.

The start of the film includes real historical events which are not in the book: Dr. Arnold closing down the school hunt; Dr. Arnold complaining that before his time, there were no masters in the school overnight to keep the boys in order.

=== Accolades ===
The film was nominated for Made for TV Movie in 2005 by RITV.
