= Mansfield Park (1999 film) =

1999 period film directed by Patricia Rozema

- Theatrical release poster
- Directed by: Patricia Rozema
- Screenplay by: Patricia Rozema
- Based on: Mansfield Park by Jane Austen
- Produced by: Sarah Curtis
- Starring: Embeth Davidtz; Jonny Lee Miller; Alessandro Nivola; Frances O'Connor; Harold Pinter; Lindsay Duncan; Sheila Gish; James Purefoy; Victoria Hamilton; Justine Waddell; Hugh Bonneville
- Cinematography: Michael Coulter
- Edited by: Martin Walsh
- Music by: Lesley Barber
- Production companies: Miramax Films; BBC Films; The Arts Council of England; Miramax HAL Films
- Distributed by: Buena Vista International
- Release dates: 19 November 1999 (United States); 31 March 2000 (United Kingdom)
- Running time: 112 minutes
- Country: United Kingdom
- Language: English
- Box office: $4.7 million

Mansfield Park is a 1999 British romantic comedy-drama film based on Jane Austen's 1814 novel of the same name, written and directed by Patricia Rozema. The film departs from the original novel in several respects. For example, the life of Jane Austen is incorporated into the film, as are the issues of slavery and West Indian plantations. The majority of the film was filmed on location at Kirby Hall in Northamptonshire.

== Plot ==
At the age of 10, Fanny Price is sent to live with her wealthy uncle and aunt, Sir Thomas and Lady Bertram. Once at Mansfield Park, Fanny meets her cousins Tom, Maria, Edmund and Julia, as well as Fanny's other maternal aunt, Mrs Norris. Fanny does not feel welcome, and Mrs Norris treats her more like a servant than a relative. Edmund behaves kindly to her and the two develop a friendship that grows as the years progress.

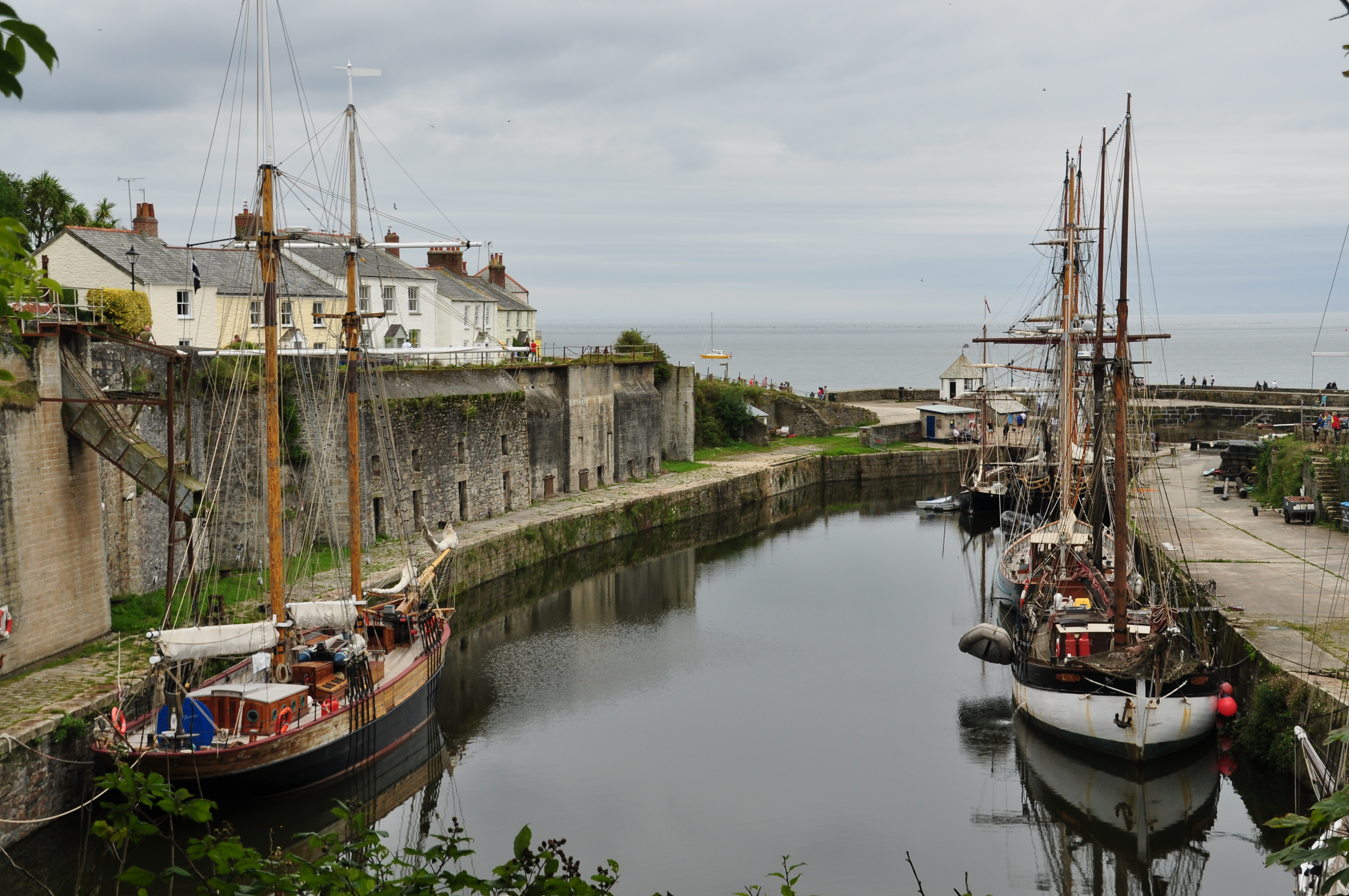
Charlestown harbour doubled as the Portsmouth home of the Price family

When Fanny is eighteen, Sir Thomas and his eldest son Tom travel to Antigua. In their absence, the Bertram family is disrupted by the arrival of Henry and Mary Crawford, relatives of the local clergyman. Worldly, cynical and beautiful, Mary and Henry arrive looking for amusement. Edmund is instantly smitten with Mary, somewhat ignoring and hurting Fanny. Maria and Julia both vie for Henry's affections, even though Maria is already engaged to Mr Rushworth. Later, Tom returns from Antigua, arriving drunk and bringing a friend, Mr Yates, with him. Yates and Tom convince the Bertrams and Crawfords to stage the risqué play Lovers' Vows, a play that allows the young people to openly flirt with each other. Edmund initially speaks out against the play but changes his mind when he is offered a part that allows him to act out intimate scenes with Mary. Sir Thomas arrives home and in anger immediately stops the rehearsals.

Maria marries Rushworth, esteeming his fortune above his character. Henry decides to pursue Fanny as a means to amuse himself. However, Fanny's gentle and kind nature gradually captures his fancy, and Henry becomes emotionally attached to her. After his behaviour towards the Bertram girls, Fanny mistrusts him and does not believe his declarations of love. Even so, Henry proposes and Fanny is pressured by her uncle to accept the offer; she disappoints the family by refusing. Angry, Sir Thomas gives Fanny an ultimatum: accept Henry's proposal of marriage or be sent back to her poor family and experience the difference in comfort. Fanny looks to Edmund for support, but his silence forces her to choose the latter. Several days after her return home, Henry pays a visit to convince Fanny that his affections for her are genuine. Although she looks more favourably on him, Fanny continues to cling to her feelings for Edmund and rejects Henry. Only when a letter from Edmund arrives which discloses his hopes of marrying Mary does Fanny accept Henry's offer. However, Fanny takes back her acceptance the next day. Henry leaves, hurt and angry. Later Edmund arrives to take Fanny back to Mansfield Park to help care for Tom, who has fallen seriously ill and is near death. Edmund confesses he has missed Fanny.

Henry gains Maria's pity when she learns of Fanny's refusal of his marriage proposal and they are found in bed together by Fanny and Edmund. Shocked, Fanny is comforted by Edmund and the two nearly kiss, but Edmund pulls away. News of the scandal spreads rapidly and Mary quickly devises a plan to stifle the repercussions. She suggests that, after a divorce, Maria would marry Henry while Edmund would marry Mary; together they might re-introduce Henry and Maria back into society by throwing parties. Fanny questions how Mary, as a clergyman's wife, could afford lavish parties, and Mary shocks everyone by stating that if Tom dies, Edmund will be heir to the family's fortune. Edmund is appalled and tells Mary that cheerfully condemning Tom to death whilst she plans to spend his money sends a chill to his heart. Having betrayed her true nature to the Bertram family, Mary leaves their company.

Edmund ultimately declares his love for Fanny, and they marry. Sir Thomas gives up his plantation in Antigua and invests instead in tobacco, while Tom recovers from his illness. Fanny's sister Susie joins them at the Bertram household while Maria and Aunt Norris take up residence in a small cottage removed from Mansfield Park.

== Cast ==
- Frances O'Connor as Fanny Price
- Jonny Lee Miller as Edmund Bertram
- James Purefoy as Thomas Bertram Jr.
- Embeth Davidtz as Mary Crawford
- Alessandro Nivola as Henry Crawford
- Harold Pinter as Sir Thomas Bertram
- Lindsay Duncan as Lady Bertram and Mrs Price
- Victoria Hamilton as Maria Bertram
- Justine Waddell as Julia Bertram
- Hugh Bonneville as Mr Rushworth
- Sheila Gish as Mrs Norris
- Charles Edwards as Mr Yates
- Hilton McRae as Mr Price
- Sophia Myles as Susan Price
- Anna Popplewell as Betsey
- Hannah Taylor-Gordon as Young Fanny

== Differences from novel ==
David Monaghan argues that viewers should approach Rozema's Mansfield Park as 'an independent work of art rather than an adaptation of Austen's novel'. Rozema set out her goal firmly, saying that Mansfield Park was not a Jane Austen film: 'It's a Patricia Rozema film. My job as an artist is to provide a fresh view.' Paula Byrne commends Rozema for an audacious film "that eschews the heritage-style whimsy of the conventional period drama". She argues that in its deployment of feminist, gender and post-colonial themes, it recognises the contribution of more recent academic literary criticism of Austen's works, and "provides a fascinating shadow story to this most complex of novels".

The film differs from the Jane Austen novel Mansfield Park in several ways. The film changes some central characters, eliminates several others, and reorganises certain events. The result is a film that retains the core of character evolution and events of Austen's novel, but in other ways, stresses its themes and ideas differently. The plot changes the moral message of Austen's novel, making the story a critique of slavery rather than, as some critics understand it, a conservative critique. While in the novel Fanny's passivity and moral stance are represented as virtues, these aspects of her character are altered in the film. The exception is in the staging of Lovers' Vows when Fanny abstains.

=== Slavery ===
Austen's novel mentions slavery on several occasions but does not elaborate on it. Most notably, in the novel, Fanny asks a question about the slave trade to Sir Thomas and is not answered. The film includes slavery as a central plot point, including explicit descriptions of the treatment of slaves (e.g. Fanny finds violent drawings of the treatment of slaves in Tom's room) and numerous reminders of how the Bertram family's wealth is built on slavery.

The role and influence of slavery in the world of Mansfield Park is emphasized from the start of the film. Fanny sees a slave ship near the coast on her initial journey to the family, asks her coachman about it and receives an explanation.

The Australian historian Keith Windschuttle criticised Rozema for adding in this scene, not in the book, concerning the part where Fanny hears terrible cries from a ship off the coast and is told it is a slave ship bringing in its human cargo to Portsmouth. Windschuttle notes that slaves were never brought to British shores. The essence of the triangular trade was that after the ships had transported the enslaved captives from Africa to the Caribbean, they would return to Europe loaded only with sugar and tobacco. Then, leaving Europe, they would return to Africa, loaded with manufactured goods. A parallel is drawn between Fanny's role as a woman and a poor relative in the Bertram family, and the role of the enslaved.

Tom Bertram's return from Antigua is motivated by his disgust with what he has seen there, and this disgust is reinforced by a sketchbook journal that Fanny finds at Mansfield Park recounting apparently criminal events occurring in Antigua that involve Sir Thomas.

At the end of the film a voiceover also informs the viewer that Sir Thomas has divested himself of his estates in Antigua, presumably as a form of redemption.

=== The character of Fanny Price ===
Rozema employs "a collage or prismatic-like approach" in her adaptation of Fanny's character, incorporating elements of Jane Austen's character in order to update the "annoying" character for a contemporary audience. Rozema's modification of the character of Fanny Price, whom she considered an unpopular heroine, was to add colour and spirit by conflating her with the character of Austen herself, drawing upon her extensive juvenilia and letters. In the novel, Fanny is very shy and timid, and generally reluctant to give her own opinion. Her physical condition is frail, making her tire easily. In the film, in contrast, Fanny is extroverted, self-confident, and outspoken, while also being physically healthier.

In addition, the film version of Fanny is portrayed as a writer from her childhood into her adulthood at Mansfield Park. These character traits are incorporated directly from the life of Jane Austen – some of Fanny's writings are actually Austen's, including the "History of England".

Monaghan takes issue with Rozema's depiction of Fanny's 'enlightened attitudes towards issues of gender, class and race'. He sees this as trendy liberal humanism that seeks to make the awkward heroine more acceptable to a modern audience. This view is considered enigmatic by some as others assert that both Austen and Fanny share enlightened attitudes towards gender, class and race. In the novel, it is the hard-working, ill-educated lower-class Price children who are the victors. Fanny alone resists the power of the landed gentry, defying both the awesome patriarch, Sir Thomas Bertram, and the manipulative seducer, Henry Crawford.

=== Overt references to sexuality ===
This adaptation modernises the chaste, virtuous story by including several references to sexuality. The first instance, Fanny's discovery of Maria and Henry Crawford in clandestine sexual activity during a rehearsal of Lover's Vows, is not included in the book, where the flirtation is far more subtle. Secondly, Mary Crawford's frequent sensual touches and lingering gazes on Fanny convey a homoerotic tension with little textual support. Rozema claimed the "lesbian frisson" was "definitely in the book," arising from Miss Crawford's worldly character, though admitted she chose Mansfield Park because she "knew she could indulge herself in a couple of scenes."

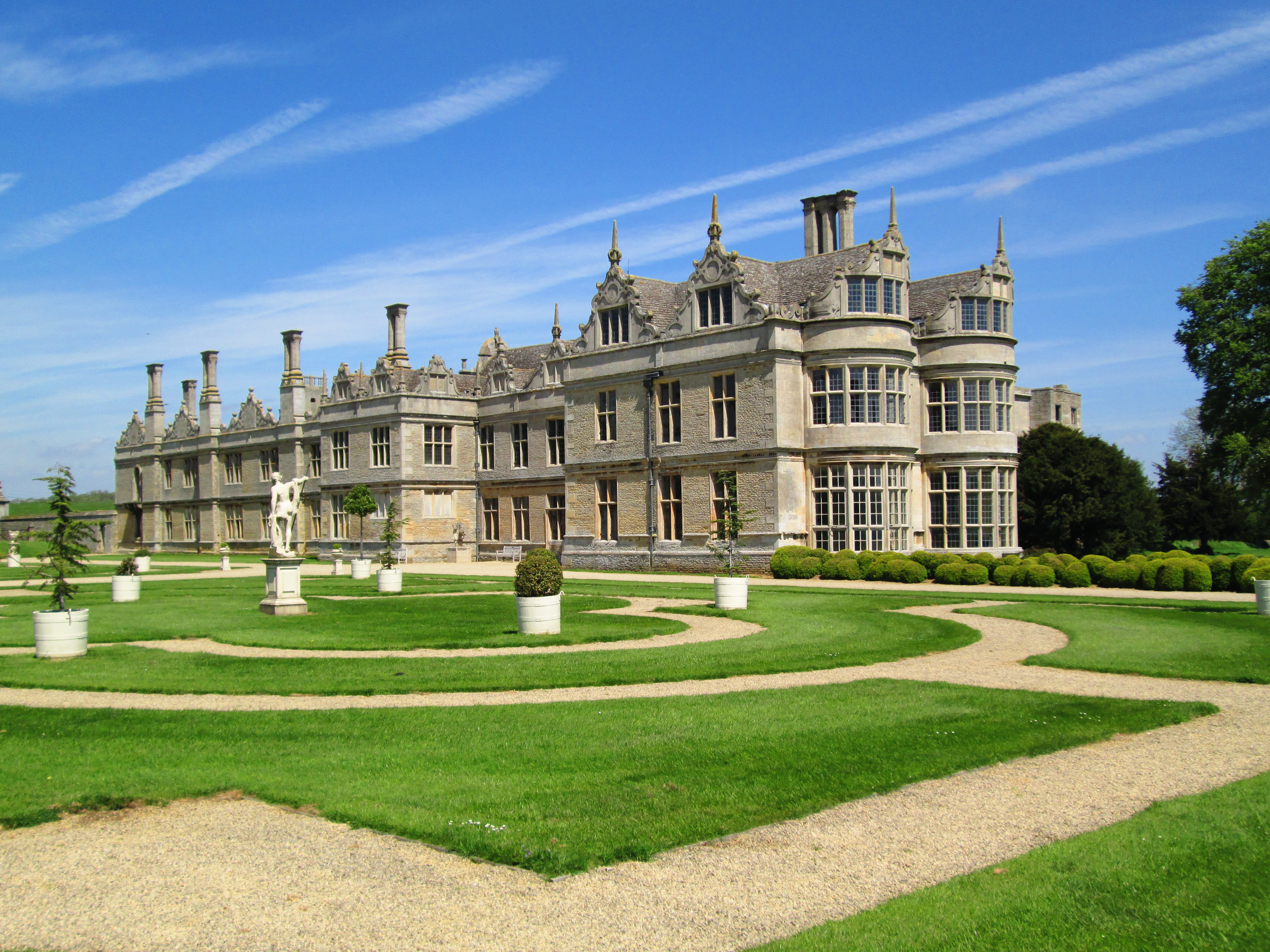
Kirby Hall in Northamptonshire doubled as Mansfield Park

== Reception ==
Mansfield Park has received generally favourable reviews from critics. Film review aggregator Rotten Tomatoes reports that 78% of critics gave the film a positive review based on 73 reviews, with an average score of 6.9/10. The website's critical consensus reads, "Solid performances, bold direction." On Metacritic, which assigns a rating out of 100 based on reviews from critics, the film has a score of 71 based on 31 reviews.

Roger Ebert of the Chicago Sun-Times gave it a four-star review, saying, "This is an uncommonly intelligent film, smart and amusing too, and anyone who thinks it is not faithful to Austen doesn't know the author but only her plots." Owen Gleiberman of Entertainment Weekly also gave the film a positive review, dubbing it as "a handsome and forceful piece of work" and praising O'Connor's ability to display the "quiet battle of emotions in Fanny."

Andrew Johnston of Time Out New York wrote: "Grafting incidents gleaned from Jane Austen's journals and letters onto the story of the author's third novel, Rozema captures the writer's combination of prickly wit and hopeless romanticism as few filmmakers have. ... You may be able to see Mansfield Park's ending coming from a mile away, but it's so beautifully constructed and dramatically satisfying when it arrives that you probably won't mind at all."

=== Box office ===
It opened in the UK in 76 cinemas on 31 March 2000 and grossed £103,266 in its opening weekend.
