= Jackie Smith-Wood =

British actress

Jacqueline A. Smith-Wood (born 1954) is a British actress and director. As an actress she has worked in film, television, theatre and radio.

Internationally she is best known for her portrayal of Mary Crawford in the BBC's 1983 miniseries of Jane Austen's Mansfield Park. On stage, she starred opposite Peter O'Toole in Man and Superman and Pygmalion. She made over a dozen British television appearances.

== Early life and education ==
Jackie Smith-Wood was born in 1954 in Cheltenham, Gloucestershire, England. She was educated at Oxford University and at the Webber Douglas Academy of Dramatic Art.

== Career ==
Smith-Wood's stage credits include:

- Witch in Macbeth at the Old Vic (1980)
- Jessica in The Merchant of Venice at the Old Vic (Prospect Theatre Company) (1980)
- Ann Whitefield in Shaw's Man and Superman with Peter O'Toole, at the Cambridge Theatre (1982)
- Eliza Doolittle opposite Peter O'Toole's Henry Higgins, in George Bernard Shaw's Pygmalion at the Haymarket Theatre, Leicester, then the Shaftesbury Theatre (1984)
- Mrs Gibbs in The Royal Baccarat Scandal by Royce Ryton, at the Theatre Royal, Haymarket (1989)

She is best known for her portrayal of Mary Crawford in the BBC's 1983 miniseries of Jane Austen's Mansfield Park. She made over a dozen British television appearances, including a guest-starring role in the series Barry Morse Presents Strange But True.

Smith-Wood directed Chekov's The Bear and The Proposal for Studio Theatrale du Luberon in 2006, and Noël Coward's Blithe Spirit for Studio Theatrale du Luberon in 2008.

== Personal life ==
Smith-Wood married Anthony Colburn in 1979. They have three children and currently live in Gloucestershire, and she writes under the name of Jackie Colburn.
