= Maria Bertram =

Fictional character from Mansfield Park

- Mansfield Park character
- Michelle Ryan as Maria Bertram in the ITV drama

In-universe information
- Gender: Female
- Family: Sir Thomas Bertram (father); Lady Maria Bertram (mother); Thomas Bertram (brother); Edmund Bertram (brother); Julia Bertram (sister)
- Spouse: James Rushworth (divorced)
- Relatives: Fanny Price (cousin); Frances Price (aunt); Mrs. Norris (aunt); Susan Price (cousin)
- Home: Mansfield Park; after her marriage, Sotherton Court; after her divorce, in an unnamed other country with her aunt Norris.

Maria Bertram is a fictional character in Jane Austen's 1814 novel, Mansfield Park. She decides to go through with marrying Rushworth, a man she despises, due to his wealth as well as her broken heart, and moves to London. She later has an affair with Henry Crawford, and meets her fate as a fallen woman who is exiled from society as "punishment".

== Character background ==
Maria Bertram is one of the two daughters of Sir Thomas Bertram, a Member of Parliament who owns the large country estate, Mansfield Park. She has a sister named Julia.

Her father is a baronet. She has two older brothers, and a sister one year younger than herself. She grows up treated with stern distance by her father, kindly ignored by her indolent, self-centered mother, but spoiled and indulged by her Aunt Norris (who seeks to remain ingratiated with the Bertrams).

When she is thirteen, her family brings a poor ten year-old cousin, Fanny Price, to live with them. She has little interest in Fanny and treats her with condescension, giving Fanny the toys of the least value to herself. She mocks Fanny for her ignorance and reports on Fanny's apparent deficiencies to her Aunt Norris. When she grows to adulthood, she is considered in the neighborhood to be a great beauty.

== Maria and Mr. Rushworth ==
When Sir Thomas goes to Antigua to attend to problems on his sugar plantation, Maria, being at the age to marry, is introduced by Aunt Norris to a young man named Mr. Rushworth. Although Mr. Rushworth is neither intelligent nor handsome, he does have a large estate of 700 acres and is worth about 12,000 pounds per annum, a very substantial income for the time. Maria, eager to escape her parental home, agrees to his proposal (subject to Sir Thomas' approval when he returns to England).

== Maria and Mr. Crawford ==
Immediately after Maria's engagement to Mr. Rushworth, a young man named Henry Crawford comes to the neighbourhood with his sister, Mary. Because Maria has no real affection for Mr. Rushworth, she does not scruple to flirt with Henry, and she also befriends Mary. Henry also favours her over her unattached younger sister, Julia, even though (or perhaps because) her engagement makes her unavailable. Julia, too, is attracted to Crawford. This puts Maria and her sister in competition with one another. When Henry leaves without proposing to her, Maria insists on going through with her marriage to Mr. Rushworth, partly out of disappointment and partly to escape her stifling home life. She goes to Brighton on her honeymoon, taking Julia with her, and from there the party proceeds to Mr. Rushworth's new London home.

== Maria's disgrace ==
In London, Maria encounters Henry and their flirtation begins anew. It proceeds to an affair, which becomes publicly known. The two elope, bringing shame to her family and disgrace on her. In fear, Julia also elopes and marries Mr. Yates, a friend of her oldest brother, Tom Bertram. Henry refuses to marry Maria, and Mr. Rushworth divorces her for adultery. She moves to "another country" (another rural area of England) with her Aunt Norris, and they live together financially supported by Sir Thomas.

== Notable portrayals ==
- Samantha Bond portrayed the adult Maria in the 1983 British television serial (Mansfield Park (1983 TV serial))
- Elizabeth Eaton as the young Maria, and Victoria Hamilton as the teenage Maria in the 1999 film adaptation
- Tara Berwin as the younger Maria, and Michelle Ryan in ITV's 2007 television adaptation of Mansfield Park
