= The Browning Version (1994 film) =

- Theatrical release poster
- Directed by: Mike Figgis
- Screenplay by: Ronald Harwood
- Based on: The Browning Version; 1948 play by Terence Rattigan
- Produced by: Ridley Scott; Mimi Polk Gitlin
- Starring: Albert Finney; Greta Scacchi; Matthew Modine
- Cinematography: Jean-François Robin
- Edited by: Hervé Schneid
- Music by: Mark Isham
- Production company: Percy Main Productions
- Distributed by: Paramount Pictures (through United International Pictures)
- Release dates: 12 October 1994 (United States); 28 October 1994 (United Kingdom)
- Running time: 97 minutes
- Country: United Kingdom
- Language: English
- Budget: $7 million
- Box office: $0.5 million (US/Canada)

The Browning Version is a 1994 British drama film directed by Mike Figgis, written by Ronald Harwood, and starring Albert Finney, Greta Scacchi, and Matthew Modine. The film is based on the 1948 stage play of the same name by Terence Rattigan, which was previously adapted for film under the same name in 1951.

== Plot ==
Andrew Crocker-Harris is a veteran teacher of Greek and Latin at a British public school. After nearly 20 years of service, he is being forced to retire on the pretext of his health, and perhaps may not even be given a pension. He is disliked or ignored by the other teachers and while his pupils fear his relentlessly strict discipline, they are bored by his dictatorial but dreary and uninspiring teaching methods. His younger wife Laura, whom he has sexually and emotionally neglected, is unfaithful, and now lives to wound him any way she can. She is having an affair with Frank, an eager, young American science teacher who is highly popular with his pupils, much more lenient with classroom rules yet is able to connect with the pupils. In his final class, Andrew, while reading from a Greek play, finally shows some genuine passion about the subject, giving a glimpse at the teacher he could have been. Andrew's nervous new replacement Tom expresses his awe at the ironclad control that the former exerts over his classes, but Andrew advises his young colleague not to follow his example.

As his retirement at the end of the school term draws near, Andrew is approached by a quiet and sensitive pupil named Taplow who has detected the unhappiness and loneliness of his teacher and makes an attempt to reach out to him, saying that Andrew's Latin teachings have inspired him. Taplow gives Andrew a gift – a rare copy of an early edition of the 'Browning Version' – the 1877 translation by Robert Browning of Aeschylus' ancient play Agamemnon. Touched by this gesture, Andrew's emotional guard begins to be let down for the first time. Increasingly aware of Andrew's isolation, Frank feels guilty about the affair with Laura and ends the relationship. Shortly before the end-of-term school assembly in which Andrew will make his farewell speech, Laura tells her husband that she wants their marriage to end and that she intends to leave him.

The school's senior staff want Andrew to make his speech first, to be followed by the farewell speech of a younger, more popular teacher who is leaving to pursue a career as a cricketer. But Andrew insists on going second, even though the headmaster angrily says that it will give the ceremony an 'anti-climax'. To the surprise of everyone, including Laura who has lingered to watch the event, Andrew's speech is highly emotional and revelatory, apologising for his failures both as a teacher and as a person. Moved by the speech, the pupils and staff give Andrew a huge applause.

Andrew, as a parting gesture of gratitude, tells Taplow that he has organised a place for him in Frank's science class which the pupil had been eager to join. Laura has a newfound sense of respect for her husband and the two part on good terms. As he watches Laura drive away, Andrew sadly but calmly faces the next phase of his life.

== Cast ==
- Albert Finney as Andrew Crocker-Harris
- Greta Scacchi as Laura Crocker-Harris
- Matthew Modine as Frank Hunter
- Julian Sands as Tom Gilbert
- Michael Gambon as Dr. Frobisher
- Ben Silverstone as Taplow
- Oliver Milburn as Trubshaw
- Jim Sturgess as Bryant (credited as James Sturgess)
- Joseph Beattie as Wilson
- Mark Bolton as Grantham
- Tom Havelock as Laughton
- Walter Micklethwaite as Buller
- Jotham Annan as Prince Abakendi
- David Lever as David Fletcher
- Bruce Myers as Dr. Rafferty
- Maryam d'Abo as Diana
- Heathcote Williams as Dr. Lake

== Production ==
The interior and exterior scenes in The Browning Version were filmed at Milton Abbey School and Sherborne School, two boys' independent schools in Dorset, in southern England.

Extensive use was made of Sherborne School's existing classrooms and of its historic cloisters. The scene in which Crocker-Harris acknowledges Frank's affair with his wife was shot in the school library. The climactic scene in which he acknowledges his failure as a teacher was filmed in the Old School Room. An additional science experiment scene was shot in which Frank Hunter (Modine) ignited an explosive liquid poured into pupils’ hands to shock them, but it was cut from the final edit. Other filming locations in Sherborne included Cheap Street and the Abbey Green, and many pupils from Sherborne School were used as extras.

== Release ==
The Browning Version opened 12 October 1994 in 12 theaters in the United States and grossed $48,719 in its opening weekend.It eventually grossed $487,391 in the United States and Canada. In the United Kingdom, it opened on 28 October 1994 on 33 screens and grossed £38,093 in its opening weekend to finish in 14th place at the UK box office.

== Reception ==
The Browning Version received positive reviews from critics. The film holds a 78% approval rating on Rotten Tomatoes based on 18 reviews, with an average rating of 6.6/10.

== Awards and nominations ==
Nominations:

- Palme d'Or (Golden Palm), Cannes Film Festival (1994)
- Best Screenplay, BAFTA Awards (1995)

Wins:

- Best Actor (Albert Finney), Boston Society of Film Critics Awards (1994)
