= Mary Crawford (Mansfield Park) =

- Mansfield Park character
- Mary Crawford and her brother, Henry Crawford, in the 2007 ITV television drama Mansfield Park

In-universe information
- Family: (both parents deceased)
- Relatives: siblings: Henry Crawford (full); Mrs. Grant (half)
- Home: Mansfield Parsonage

Mary Crawford is a major character in Jane Austen's 1814 novel, Mansfield Park. Mary is depicted as attractive, caring and charismatic. The reader is gradually shown, often through the eyes of Fanny Price, a hidden, darker side to Mary's personality. Her wit disguises her superficiality and her charisma disguises her self-centredness. Edmund Bertram, an earnest young man and destined for the clergy falls deeply in love with her. Only at the end of the novel does reality overcome his romantic fantasies and he leaves her with deep regret.

== First Appearance ==
Mary Crawford, often characterised as the anti-heroine, first appears in the novel in July of the year when Fanny Price, the shy and apparently insignificant heroine, is eighteen. Mary, accompanied by her brother, Henry, comes to the country with sophisticated London airs, tastes, and manners and with a decided interest in courtship. The Crawfords have been living in London with their uncle, the Admiral, but when he brings his mistress into the house, Mary decides it is time to leave. She fails to persuade her brother to move to his Norfolk estate and take her with him. Mary then accepts a warm invitation from her older half-sister, Mrs. Grant, to live with her at the parsonage where Dr. Grant, her husband and fifteen years her senior, has recently purchased the living. Mary is concerned that she will find the country and the people in it to be dull, but she comes to appreciate it.

== Character ==
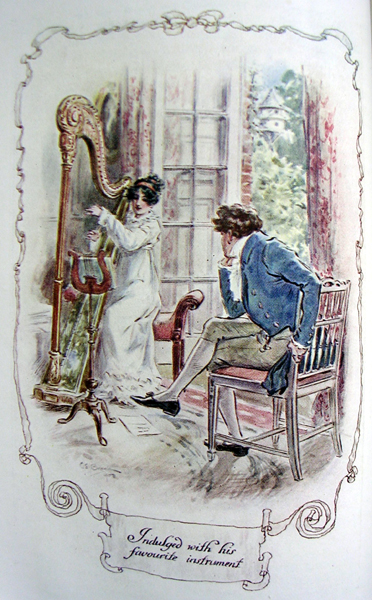
Mary Crawford plays the harp for Edmund Bertram (Brock, 1909)

Colleen Sheehan says that Austen subtly creates the conditions that allow the reader to reach a morally ambiguous view of the Crawfords. She consciously makes Henry and Mary Crawford vibrant, intelligent, witty, and alluring while, at the same time, they engage in actions that are morally repugnant. She does this not to manipulate her readers, but to put them in a position in which they have to exercise their own powers of observation and judgement.

Austen family tradition held that Austen based Mary's character on her vivacious cousin, Eliza de Feullide. Like Eliza, Mary plays the harp, is elegant and fashionable, adores London, laces her vocabulary with French phrases, is witty, loves amateur dramatics and enchants every man she meets. And she has a disdain for clergymen. Others have noted that Mary has much in common with the narrator and that parallels can also be found in Austen's own correspondence. Mary thoroughly charms the wealthy Bertram family and is predictably interested in Tom Bertram, the elder son and heir of Sir Thomas Bertram, master of Mansfield Park. Being a young woman with a fortune of £20,000, she considers Tom to be a suitable match. However, her feelings obey neither her financial goals nor her cultural norms and she finds herself preferring instead the younger brother, Edmund.

Edmund and his cousin, Fanny Price, discuss Mary's merits. They both enthuse about her appearance and manner, but have one reservation. They find her indiscreet about the Admiral and his ways, see this as an impropriety that violates privacy, and they blame her upbringing. As Mary develops an interest in Edmund, Edmund reciprocates. This displeases Fanny who believes Mary's speech and actions are too much influenced by the morality of London society that prizes only frivolity, money and status. Fanny fears that Mary's charms are blinding Edmund to these increasingly evident moral flaws. Fanny is also secretly in love with Edmund.

== Mary tests Edmund ==
Byrne argues that it is the friction between Mary, the sexually confident coquette and Edmund, the grave, prudish, religious figure that gives their relationship its dynamic. Mary's persistent attempts to dissuade Edmund from his decision to be ordained develop into "a struggle for the control of Edmund's spirit", something Mary clearly finds thrilling. Byrne further maintains that although some critics are perplexed by Mary's admiration for the rather stolid Edmund, this is to misunderstand the workings of the coquette/clergyman relationship. Mary's rival is the church. Her conflict with Edmund's religious vocation is no less than a fight for his soul, and this is why Fanny is so opposed to Mary. Austen never uses the word "vocation" in the novel. In defending his intended profession Edmund makes no reference to any inner spiritual experience, preferring instead the stolid language of logic and duty. In this, he is closer to High Church piety than to that of the reforming Evangelicals with whom he is sometimes confused.

=== Outing to Sotherton ===
During the family visit to Sotherton Court, the young people enter the chapel and Mary, overhearing some family banter, learns of Edmund's intention to become a clergyman. Astonished and disappointed, she attempts to dissuade Edmund from his ministry. Her strategy ranges from gentle persuasion – 'You really are fit for something better. Come, do change your mind. It is not too late. Go into the law' – to cruel attempts to emasculate him: 'Men love to distinguish themselves, and in either of the other lines [army or law], distinction may be gained, but not in the church. A clergyman is nothing'.

The Crawfords have often been portrayed by critics as those who threaten the ways and values of the countryside and, by extension, of England itself. However, Byrne argues that the "Crawfords are merely the agents of change: the real corruption rests at the door of the flawed custodians of the house, Sir Thomas and Lady Bertram and Mrs Norris". Although Mary's trenchant views are expressed as a resistance to spiritual discipline, they are well constructed, witty and reflect sentiments found in other contemporary streams of philosophy and spirituality. Mary reveals an extensive knowledge of church practice when she suggests that a wise clergyman would do better to read aloud from Hugh Blair's books of sermons than to preach his own.

Illicit misconduct and sexual temptation are suggested by Austen from the moment the young people reach a door, 'temptingly open on a flight of steps which led immediately to... all the sweets of pleasure-grounds, [and] as by one impulse, one wish for air and liberty, all walked out'. Mary's tempting of Edmund is serpent-like, putting his resolve to an almost Biblical test. Her aim is that his desire for her will overcome his desire for the ministry. Austen, unlike many of her contemporary writers, almost never quotes from the Bible; yet biblical themes are not difficult to find. The 'wilderness' experience at Sotherton contains hints of the Garden of Eden in Genesis and the wilderness wanderings of the Israelites in Exodus. Her ongoing challenge to his vocation has echoes of the wilderness temptation of Jesus in the Gospels. Both Crawfords fulfil the subtle serpentine role as they offer moral shortcuts to a happy life.

=== Boring services ===
Mary applauds the late Mr Rushworth's decision to abandon the twice daily prayers in the family chapel, eloquently describing such practice as an imposition for both family and servants. She derides the heads of households for their hypocrisy in making excuses to absent themselves from chapel. She pities the young ladies of the house, 'starched up into seeming piety, but with heads full of something very different—specially if the poor chaplain were not worth looking at'. Edmund acknowledges from his own experience that long services can be boring but maintains that without self-discipline a private spirituality will be insufficient for moral development.

=== Hypocritical clergy ===
Austen often exposed clergy corruption through parody. Mary having declared that the occupation of a clergyman is neither prestigious nor profitable, now argues that the profession is unworthy, filled only by lazy and gluttonous men like her brother-in-law, Dr Grant. She arrives at the jaundiced conclusion that a 'clergyman has nothing to do, but be slovenly and selfish, read the newspaper, watch the weather and quarrel with his wife. His curate does all the work and the business of his own life is to dine'. Mary's view of Regency clergy is widely confirmed by historians; Edmund's commitment to integrity and morality represents a minority vision.

=== Patronage a corrupt practice? ===
Mary also challenges the widespread practice of patronage; she attacks Edmund's expectation of a living for being based on privilege rather than on merit. Although Sir Thomas had sold the more desirable Mansfield living to pay off Tom's debts, he is still offering Edmund a guaranteed living at Thornton Lacey where he can lead the life of a country gentleman. Edmund's defence, backed up by Fanny, has logic but lacks a robust spirituality.

=== Puns ===
Mary is also highly critical of the navy. She tells Edmund, "Of various admirals, I could tell you a great deal; of them and their flags, and the gradation of their pay, and their bickerings and jealousies. But, in general, I can assure you that they are all passed over, and all very ill used." At her uncle's home she met many admirals. "Of Rears, and Vices, I saw enough. Now, do not be suspecting me of a pun, I entreat." Edmund ignores the crude pun and its implied impropriety, replying: "It is a noble profession". There is no further discussion of what Mary may, or may not, have seen. Austen, in creating this dialogue, is signalling that just as Edmund needs to look out for hidden meanings, so too should the reader.

Byrne, like many contemporary critics, interprets the pun as a reference to sodomy. Ross argues for an alternative interpretation, namely that "Mary's naughty innuendo clearly concerns flagellation: utterly unfit for a lady's conversation, but legal; widely popular, not only with old roués and young bucks, but even among such eminent figures as the future Prime Minister, Lord Melbourne". The practice is represented in the satirical cartoons of Gillray and Rowlandson, where birches and buttocks make frequent appearances.

=== Theatricals ===
During the rehearsals for Elizabeth Inchbald's play, Lovers Vows, Mary watches her brother rehearse with Maria (already engaged to Mr Rushworth). Mary is amused rather than concerned. She quips, 'those indefatigable rehearsers, Agatha and Frederick, should excel at their parts, for they are so often embracing. If they are not perfect, I shall be surprised.'

When Mary herself gets involved in the play she is given the part of Amelia, the coquette. She asks, "What gentleman among you am I to have the pleasure of making love to?" She is cast opposite the pastor, Anhalt, who closely resembles Edmund in character and situation, a role that Edmund is finally manipulated into taking. They rehearse in the East Room, monitored by Fanny who finds this doubly distressing. Thomas Edwards suggests that the inherent danger of Lovers' Vows for the young actors is that they cannot distinguish between acting and real life. Much later Mary reflects on the rehearsal to Fanny, "He was to be describing and recommending matrimony to me.… If I had the power of recalling any one week of my existence, it should be that week, that acting week ... for I never knew such exquisite happiness in any other. His sturdy spirit to bend as it did! Oh! it was sweet beyond expression. Byrne interprets this memory of Mary's as one of triumph, delighting in Edmund's sexual submission. As such, the submission is an outworking of Mary's serpentine role, foreshadowed at Sotherton. The Biblical allusion to Jesus, challenged to fulfil his mission by bowing down before Satan, is reflected in Mary's fantasy that Edmund is surrendering his vocation by bowing down before her.

Mary recognises Edmund's worth and is attracted by his steadiness and integrity, but cynically insists that there is no glamour in being 'honest and poor' – 'I have a much greater respect for those that are honest and rich'. Mary will not lower herself to marry a clergyman, in particular a clergyman with a serious vocation: 'It was plain that he could have no serious views, no true attachment, by fixing himself in a situation which he must know she would never stoop to'.

After promising Edmund the first two dances at the ball soon be given at Mansfield Park for Fanny's benefit, Mary tells Edmund it will be the last time she will dance with him, because the next time they meet he will be ordained, and "she never has danced with a clergyman... and she never will". Edmund drops his decision to propose. The following day, he leaves for Peterborough and his ordination. Mary is upset. She cannot cut herself off from Edmund. Fanny believes, and the narrator implies at the end of the novel, that Mary would have eventually altered her views and married Edmund if not for the scandal that ends up dividing them.

== Mary and Fanny ==
=== Support ===
Mary is never unfriendly to Fanny or intentionally cruel to her, but initially pays her little attention. She is puzzled by Fanny's status, is she 'out' or 'not out'. She is also aware that the Bertram family do not treat her with much respect. Early on, Mary apologises for having thoughtlessly monopolised Fanny's horse.

When the other young people are away she is quickly bored and invites Fanny to come to the parsonage, hear her play on the harp, and take walks together. Mary begins to appreciate and respect Fanny, describing her as a sweet and upright person. Fanny, more cautious, spends time with Mary out of a sense of obligation, not really liking or trusting her. She resents Mary, fearful that she will take Edmund away from her.

During the preparations for the play, Lovers Vows, Fanny is put under pressure by Tom and Maria to participate. Mrs Norris verbally attacks Fanny for refusing. Mary, astonished and angry, acts to protect and support Fanny, aware that not even Edmund was intervening.

After Maria's marriage, Henry returns to Mansfield parsonage and tells Mary that he intends to amuse himself by making Fanny fall in love with him. Mary knows his manipulative ways and that he will abandon Fanny in the same way that he has previously abandoned Maria, Julia and many other women. After some token objections, she allows Henry to proceed, believing that "a little love" might be good for Fanny, but she qualifies her approval, asking that Henry not "plunge her deep" as she is "as good a creature as ever lived."

=== Collusion ===
Byrne suggests that Inchbald's phrase, the mistress of 'whimsical insinuations' might fittingly be applied to Mary. Mary, reflecting with Fanny on their time at Sotherton, teasingly commends her brother for his flirtatious behaviour, so making her complicit in his misconduct. Henry attempts to distance himself from his behaviour at that time.

Mary's attitude to Fanny becomes more complex. While maintaining a supportive friendship, her motivation is ambivalent. She develops a deceitful collusion with Henry in his attempted conquest of Fanny that now takes priority. Mary's generous gift of a golden necklace to Fanny for her 'coming out' ball is gradually revealed as a chain to bind Fanny closer to Henry. Even so, Fanny continues to resist and Henry, to his surprise, falls in love, telling Mary that he will make Fanny marry him. Mary is astonished, believing it is only the challenge of Fanny's resistance that appeals to him (much like Edmund's resistance to forgo ordination for her does to her). She does however believe that Fanny would make Henry a better person. Mary is shocked when Fanny refuses Henry, but remains friends with her, encouraging her to reconsider. She begs Fanny, on behalf of the female sex, to bask in the conquest she has made over a man who has been desired and 'shot at' by so many women.

Mary and Fanny go separate ways when Fanny is sent on a visit to her parental home in Portsmouth, and Mary goes to London to visit friends. Mary uses her letters to Fanny as a way of including messages from Henry. She continues to encourage Fanny to accept Henry's suit and discusses her own mixed feelings with regard to Edmund.

== Outcome ==
While Mary is in London, Henry pursues Fanny to Portsmouth, still declaring his love. He then returns to London. Mary distracts him, insisting that he stay on for an important society event where he meets Maria. Maria is cold towards him, hurting his pride. He pursues her afresh, leading to an unintended adulterous affair.

Edmund goes to London and, while there, arranges to meet with Mary for the last time. He intends the meeting to be a sad final farewell. However, their conversation goes badly and Edmund is profoundly shocked. The reader learns the details as Edmund gradually unburdens himself to Fanny.

Mary offends Edmund by her openness as she discusses the adulterous affair between her brother and his sister without any embarrassment or modesty. She even partly blames the affair on Fanny for having rejected Henry's proposal of marriage. (Mrs Norris expressed similar sentiments.) She views the affair as merely a "folly" and blames the couple for their carelessness in getting caught. She wants them to put things right by getting married, failing to recognise that Henry, her-own brother, will never commit (it slipping her mind that her brother is notorious for lacking commitment). And she wants (and actually expects) society to ignore the couple's wrongdoings and accept them back. Edmund is robust and comprehensive in his response.

Mary is hurt by what she sees as Edmund's judgemental and narrow-minded attitude. Significant 20th century critics have taken Mary's side. Mary responds angrily to Edmund, "At this rate, you will soon reform every body at Mansfield and Thornton Lacey; and when I hear of you next, it may be as a celebrated preacher in some great society of Methodists, or as a missionary in foreign parts." Edmund is crushed to realise that Mary is not the woman he believed her to be, though he still leaves Mary's apartment wistfully.

Mary goes to live with Mrs Grant, now living in London. Her search for a suitable husband is made more difficult by the qualities she had seen in Edmund and now, hypocritically, considers more desirable. Austen's conclusion is somewhat open-ended. She has denied the reader the commonplace and unrealistic romantic ending in which the worldly coquette is reformed and marries the hero. At the same time, the reader has seen many qualities in Mary and is left with the faint possibility of eventual redemption.

Susan Morgan believes that to understand the novel properly requires an understanding of the potential of characters to change. Some learn from their mistakes and move on. Others do not. Superficial and materialistic, Mary is unable to appreciate improvements. She lacks both the discernment to value change in moral character and the hard work necessary to bring it about.

Colleen Sheehan concludes that "we the audience of bystanders are drawn into participation in the drama of Mansfield Park. Austen does not save Henry and Mary Crawford in this work; only they could save themselves. Neither does she save her readers. Our judgement must be our own."

== Portrayals ==
- Jackie Smith-Wood in the 1983 television serial, Mansfield Park
- Embeth Davidtz in the 1999 film, Mansfield Park directed by Patricia Rozema
- Hayley Atwell in the 2007 ITV version Mansfield Park
