= Henry Crawford =

- Mansfield Park character
- Henry Crawford (portrayed by Joseph Beattie) with his sister, Mary Crawford, in the 2007 ITV television drama Mansfield Park

In-universe information
- Relatives: Mary Crawford (sister), Mrs. Grant (half sister)
- Home: Everingham, Norfolk

Henry Crawford is one of the main characters in Jane Austen's 1814 novel, Mansfield Park. He is depicted as a man who, though not conventionally handsome, has great charisma. He is lively, witty and charming, a great asset at dinner parties, and admired by nearly all. Henry and his sister bring a fresh energy to the rather dour and oppressive atmosphere of Mansfield Park. At Sotherton his potential for disruption begins to emerge.

== Arrival of the Crawfords ==
=== Backstory ===
Henry's education had been at Westminster and Cambridge. On his twenty-first birthday, he inherited Everingham, an estate in Norfolk worth £4,000 a year (now equivalent to about £400,000).

Henry and Mary Crawford are described as lively attractive personalities with elegant London airs, and often characterised by critics as the anti-hero and anti-heroine. Orphaned, they have been living in London with their uncle, the Admiral. The Admiral's wife is said to have favoured Mary, and the Admiral to have spoiled Henry. After the Admiral's wife dies, he brings his mistress into the house and Mary decides it is time to leave. She would have preferred to move to Everingham but Henry, unwilling to settle down, refuses.

=== First appearance ===
The Crawfords first appear in the novel in July of the year when Fanny Price, the shy and apparently insignificant heroine, reaches her eighteenth birthday. Mary has accepted a warm invitation from her older half-sister, Mrs. Grant, to live with her at the parsonage where Dr. Grant, her husband and fifteen years her senior, has recently purchased the living. Henry accompanies his sister, intending to stay at Mansfield for just a few days but finds the local people more congenial than expected and decides to extend his visit.

Mrs Grant sees Henry as a suitable match for Julia, the younger of the two daughters of the wealthy Sir Thomas Bertram, master of Mansfield Park. The elder, Maria, is already engaged to the dull but wealthy Mr Rushworth. Mary does not believe Henry will ever commit to any woman and cautions her brother not to cause too much hurt to the Bertram sisters.

=== Character ===
The Crawfords have often been portrayed by critics as those who threaten the ways and values of the countryside and, by extension, of England itself. Paula Byrne sets this in context, arguing that the "Crawfords are merely the agents of change: the real corruption rests at the door of the flawed custodians of the house, Sir Thomas and Lady Bertram and Mrs Norris".

Colleen Sheehan argues that Austen subtly creates the conditions that lead readers to see the Crawfords as morally ambiguous. Henry and Mary are depicted as vibrant, intelligent, witty, and alluring while, at the same time, behaving in ways that are morally repugnant. Austen puts her readers in a position where they have to exercise their own powers of observation and judgement.

== Sotherton Court and the wilderness ==
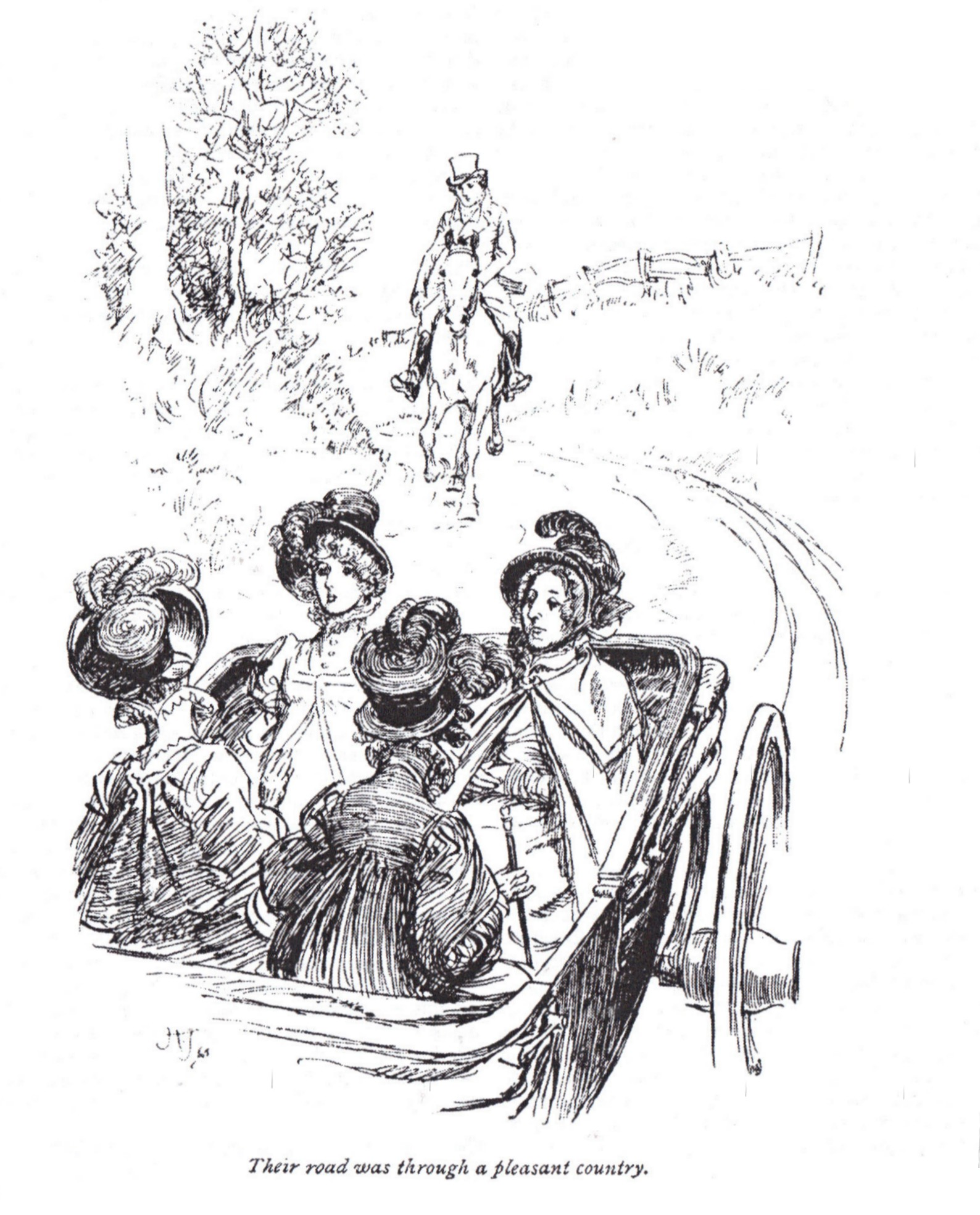
Henry's barouche on the journey to Sotherton Court. Edmund follows behind on horseback.

Sheehan says there is nothing ordinary about the superficial Crawfords or their devices and desires. "They are not only themselves corrupted ... they are bent upon dominating the wills and corrupting the souls of others. Rich, clever, and charming, they know how to captivate their audience and "take in" the unsuspecting."

On the family visit to Sotherton Court, Henry transports the five ladies in his fashionable barouche, an upmarket vehicle with seating for four inside and two up top, in its day the equivalent of a modern convertible. On the journey, Henry flirts with Julia who is seated beside him on the box.

Meaning is implied through puns, allusions, and symbolism in the description of the scene. Illicit misconduct is suggested from the moment the young people reach a door, temptingly open, "which led immediately to... all the sweets of pleasure-grounds, [and] as by one impulse, one wish for air and liberty, all walked out".

Henry now shifts his attention to Maria, subtly undermining any vestige of respect she might have for Mr Rushworth, her future husband. The group wander through the wooded wilderness and reach a locked gate at the ha-ha. To please Maria, Mr Rushworth returns to the house to fetch the key. The dialogue is full of subtle innuendo. Henry says temptingly to Maria, "You have a very smiling scene before you". She responds, "Do you mean literally or figuratively?" The characters exploit the garden's allegorical potential. Henry suggests that, if she "really wished to be more at large" and could allow herself "to think it not prohibited", then freedom was possible. Fanny watches anxiously as Maria climbs round the gate, claims her freedom and is closely followed by Henry. Colleen Sheehan compares the ha-ha, with its deep ditch separating the darkness of the wood from the light of the open field beyond, to the Eden of Milton's Paradise Lost, where the locked gates open onto a deep gulf separating Hell and Heaven. The drama at the ha-ha is a symbolic forerunner of the future moral transgressions of Henry and Maria. Both Crawfords fulfil the serpentine role as they offer moral shortcuts to happiness. Henry's flirtations cause dissension between the sisters.

== Henry as actor ==
Henry, the life and soul of any party or society event, constantly acts; he has many personas but no depth, consistency or identity. He is immature, unable to commit.

At Sotherton, Henry acts out the part of landscape improver. He is full of his own ideas for improvements to the landscape. He is described as the first to go forward to examine the 'capabilities' of the walled garden, hinting at ironic comparison with the celebrated improver, Lancelot 'Capability' Brown. He reprises the role later for Edmund's intended living at Thornton Lacey, though he lacks the consistency to manage effectively his own estate in Norfolk. Henry lives for the present moment, only interested in playing the role of improver.

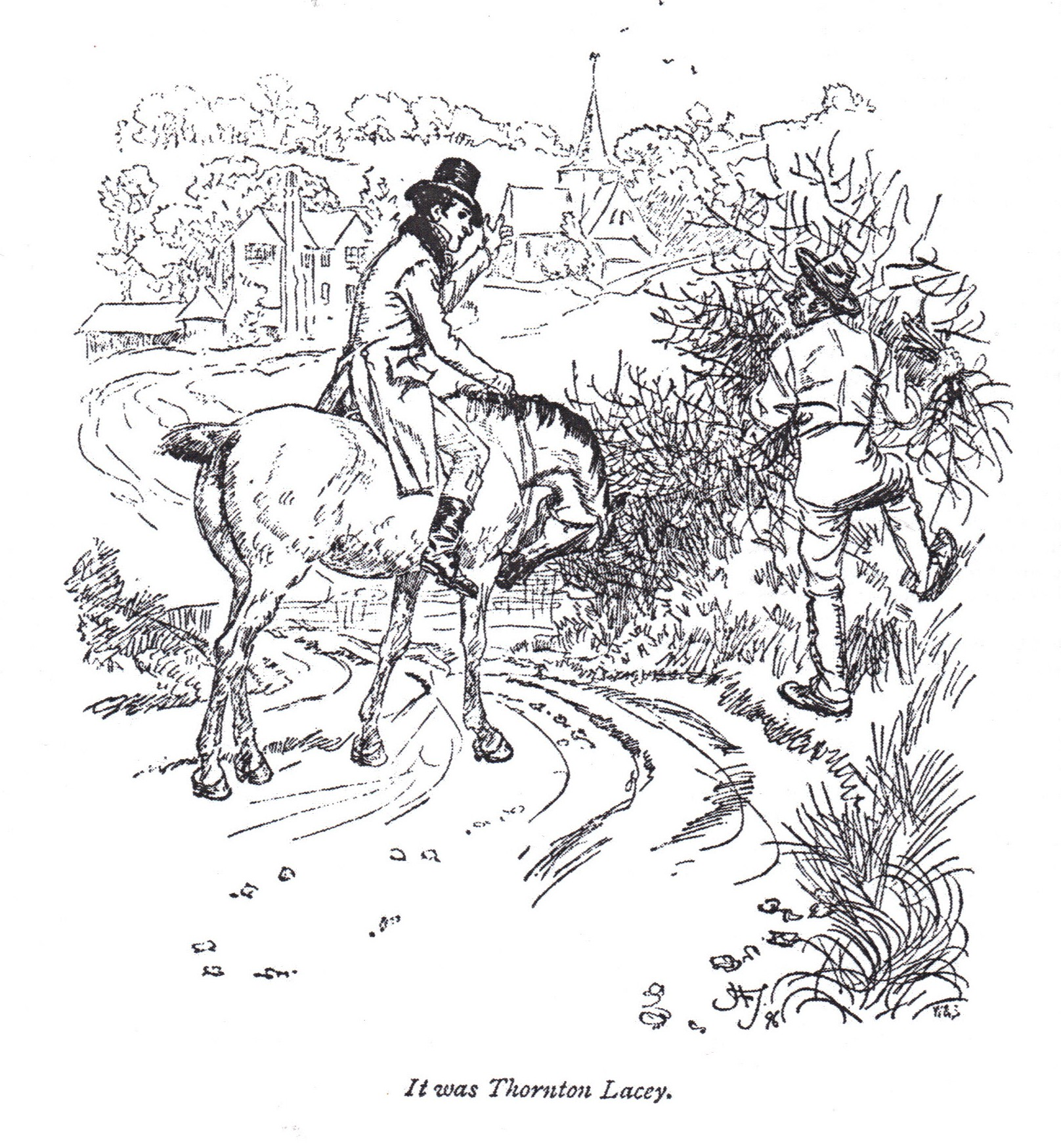
Henry Crawford visits Thornton Lacey, Edmund Bertram's future living.

At the first suggestion of a theatrical performance at Mansfield Park, Henry, for whom theatre was a new experience, declared he could undertake 'any character that ever was written, from Shylock or Richard III down to the singing hero of a farce in his scarlet coat and cocked hat. I feel as if I could be anything or everything.'

During rehearsals, Fanny considers Henry the best actor of them all. However, she observes the ongoing flirtation between Henry and the about-to-be-married Maria and declares, "Maria acted well, too well." Maria enjoys seeing the jealous discomfort on her sister Julia's face.

Henry's need to live by imitation is expressed when he considers a career in the Church of England during a conversation with Edmund, and in the Royal Navy after listening to exciting tales of the sea from William Price. Henry is a man who constantly reinvents himself.

When Henry unexpectedly falls in love with Fanny, he acts out the part of devoted lover, fully inhabiting the role. Even the hopeful Sir Thomas recognises that the admirable Henry is unlikely to sustain such a role unless Fanny responds quickly.

In chapter 34, when Henry reads Shakespeare's Henry VIII aloud to Fanny, Edmund and Lady Bertram, he impersonates one character after another with great effect, even impressing the reluctant Fanny with his skill. Fanny, a lover of Shakespeare, describes his reading as 'truly dramatic'. She is awakened by Henry to the pleasures of 'good hardened real acting'. Thomas Edwards says that even when Henry, during this discussion, tries to please Fanny by renouncing acting, he is still performing. He measures his every word and carefully watches the reaction on her face.

During this conversation, Austen also slips in a discussion on sermon delivery. Henry shows that he has the taste to recognise that the 'redundancies and repetitions' of the liturgy require good reading (in itself a telling criticism, comments Isabel Brodrick). He offers the general (and possibly valid) criticism that a 'sermon well-delivered is more uncommon even than prayers well read'. As Henry continues, his shallowness and self-aggrandisement becomes apparent: "I never listened to a distinguished preacher in my life without a sort of envy. But then, I must have a London audience. I could not preach but to the educated, to those who were capable of estimating my composition." He concludes flippantly, expressing the philosophy of many a lazy clergyman, maintaining that he should not like to preach often, but "now and then, perhaps, once or twice in the spring". Although Edmund laughs, it is clear that he does not share Henry's flippant, self-centred attitude. Henry has made it clear that his interest is in the performance and not the message. Later in the novel, when Henry suggests destroying the grounds of Thornton Lacy to create something new, Edmund rejects his plans, insisting that although the estate needs some improvements, he wishes to preserve the substance of what has been created over the centuries.

== Pursuit of women ==
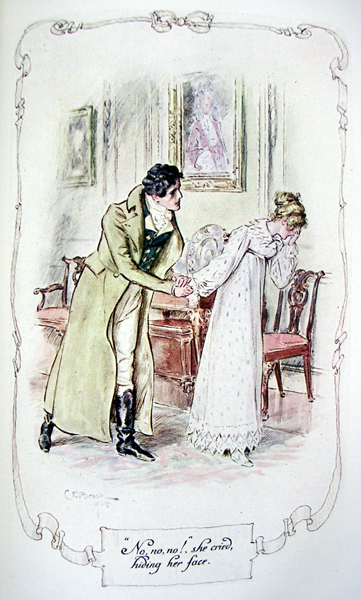
Fanny rejects Henry

=== Abandonment of Maria ===
Following Henry's attentions, first at Sotherton, and then during the theatricals at Mansfield Park, Maria anticipated a proposal from Henry. Henry however departs without explanation so Maria persists with her earlier plan to marry Mr. Rushworth despite despising him. She marries Mr. Rushworth, both to escape her family home where she feels stifled under her strict father, and because she is under the mistaken impression that it would spite Henry if she's married—failing to recognise that her status as an engaged woman, that she was 'off-limits' was what had attracted him to her, over her sister, in the first place. Henry rarely expresses any remorse for the injuries he causes to the women he pursues.

=== Pursuit of Fanny ===
After Maria and Julia leave Mansfield Park, Henry revisits. When he complains about Sir Thomas having shut down Lovers' Vows, Fanny expresses firm disapproval, attracting his attention for the first time. He realises she does not like him and decides to amuse himself by making her fall in love with him. He becomes obsessed with 'knowing' her, with achieving the glory and happiness of forcing her to love him. He plans to destroy her identity and remake her in an image of his own choosing. Fanny, who alone had observed his flirtations with her cousins, resists him. Henry unexpectedly declares to his sister that he has now genuinely fallen in love with Fanny and speaks of her sweet conduct and forbearance. Mary identifies the only real attraction for Henry as Fanny's resistance to his charms.

To make himself seem better in Fanny's eyes, Henry persuades his uncle, an admiral, to use his influence in the Royal Navy to obtain a promotion for Fanny's brother William from midshipman to lieutenant. He then proposes to Fanny, but to his surprise, she refuses him, not only because of his moral failings but because she is secretly in love with her cousin Edmund.

Fanny's uncle, Sir Thomas, is displeased and demands that she marry Henry as he believes this to be a highly desirable marriage and, for her, beyond all reasonable expectation. Although Sir Thomas reproaches her very severely, Fanny remains resolutely opposed to the marriage. Fanny's refusal to capitulate to Sir Thomas' wish is seen by Kirkham as the moral climax of the novel. Henry is not discouraged and continues to pressure her and solicit her love.

=== Portsmouth improvements ===
Sir Thomas decides to send Fanny back to her own family who live in relatively poor circumstances in Portsmouth, so that she might see how marriage to Henry would be a better option. While she is there, Henry visits, attempting to prove that he is more constant than she believed and that he is a better manager of his Norfolk estate than she thought possible. He also demonstrates that he is fully accepting of her Portsmouth family's state. Fanny, though impressed by his apparent improvement, still refuses him. Her final word to him is that he examine his own conscience, a challenge which the reader has to assume he was unwilling or unable to do. David Monaghan says that she demands of Henry more perseverance and moral commitment than he is capable of attaining.

=== Distraction and disaster ===
Henry returns to London, intending to go on to Everingham and fulfil his promise to Fanny to attend to his estate and be its effective master. However, the shallowness of Henry's feelings are exposed when, having just promised to take care of Fanny's welfare, he is distracted by Mary's ploy to renew his contact with the newly-married Maria. Piqued by Maria's haughty welcome, he is challenged to arouse her afresh. Her response gets out of hand and leads to an unwanted, adulterous affair, soon uncovered, which brings shame and disgrace on Maria and sabotages her marriage. In an act of mere whimsy, Henry destroys, irrevocably, any good impression he might have made with Fanny during his courtship.

The likeable Henry, having caused widespread damage, is now recognised as the regency rake that he is; callous, amoral and egoistical. Social perceptions of gender are such that, though Henry does suffer for his sins, Maria suffers more. And by taking Maria away from her community, he deprives the Bertrams of a family member. The inevitable reporting of the scandal in the gossip-columns only adds further to family misery. Although Henry and Maria do run away together initially, he predictably refuses to marry her and, after considerable acrimony, they part.

== Reforming Henry ==
A question Austen poses for her readers is whether or not Henry could have been reformed. Maggie Lane offers a sympathetic interpretation of Henry: "We applaud Jane Austen for showing us a flawed man morally improving, struggling, growing, reaching for better things—even if he ultimately fails." Austen's sister, Cassandra, thought Fanny should have married Henry, but despite their arguing about the matter, Jane stood firmly. At the end of the book, the narrator speculates controversially that if Henry had been more patient, Fanny would probably have accepted him. For additionally, her beloved cousin Edmund, whom Fanny longed to marry, might have married Mary, had Mary not destroyed her own reputation by attempting to justify her brother's scandalous affair. Some commentators like Thomas Edwards disagree, believing that if Fanny had accepted Henry, the narcissistic regency rake would have lost interest and turned his attentions elsewhere.

Colleen Sheehan concludes that "just as Fanny tries to remain a bystander to the production of Lovers' Vows but is drawn into the action, we the audience of bystanders are drawn into participation in the drama of Mansfield Park. Austen does not save Henry and Mary Crawford in this work; only they could save themselves. Neither does she save her readers. Our judgement must be our own."

== Portrayals ==
- Robert Burbage in the 1983 BBC television serial Mansfield Park.
- Alessandro Nivola in the 1999 Miramax film adaptation.
- Joseph Beattie in the 2007 ITV television drama Mansfield Park.
