= Fanny Price =

Fictional character by Jane Austen

Frances "Fanny" Price Jr.
- Mansfield Park character
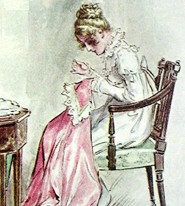
- Fanny sewing (artist C E Brock, 1908)

In-universe information
- Family: Mr Price (father); Frances Price Sr., née Ward (mother); William Price (older brother); John Price (younger brother); Richard Price (younger brother); Susan Price (younger sister); Mary Price (younger sister, deceased); Sam Price (younger brother); Tom Price (younger brother); Charles Price (youngest brother); Betsey Price (youngest sister); Sir Thomas Bertram, Bt. (uncle-by-marriage); Lady [Maria] Bertram, née Ward (maternal aunt); Tom Bertram Jr. (cousin); Edmund Bertram (cousin, later husband); Maria Bertram Jr. (cousin); Julia Bertram (cousin); Mrs. Norris, née Ward (maternal aunt)
- Home: Mansfield Park

Frances "Fanny" Price (named after her mother) is the heroine in Jane Austen's 1814 novel, Mansfield Park. The novel begins when Fanny's overburdened, impoverished family—where she is both the second-born and the eldest daughter out of 10 children—sends her at the age of ten to live in the household of her wealthy uncle, Sir Thomas Bertram, and his family at Mansfield Park. The novel follows her growth and development, concluding in early adulthood.

Key events include the arrival of the charismatic Crawfords from London, the temptations of Sotherton, the family theatrical controversy, the coming-out ball, Fanny's obstinate refusal to marry Henry Crawford, Fanny's three month penance at Portsmouth, and Maria's elopement with Henry Crawford leading to family devastation followed by a final restoration.

== Background ==
Mansfield Park is the most controversial of all Jane Austen’s novels, mainly because readers are unable to agree in their assessment of the novel’s heroine, Fanny Price. Fanny Price is unique amongst the Austen heroines in that her story begins when she is ten and traces her story up to age eighteen. Paula Byrne says, "Mansfield Park is perhaps the first novel in history to depict the life of a little girl from within".

Fanny's mother is Frances Price (née Ward) youngest sister of Lady Bertram and Mrs Norris. Her father is an impoverished retired marine lieutenant in Portsmouth. There are eight other children. Because of the Price family's poverty, Sir Thomas Bertram offers to take Fanny in and bring her up at Mansfield Park, his Northamptonshire estate.

Fanny is described as small for her age, "with no glow of complexion, nor any other striking beauty; exceedingly timid and shy, and shrinking from notice." She is self-conscious, and untutored, but not brash or offensive in her movement or speech.

=== Fanny's arrival at Mansfield Park ===
Fanny feels intimidated at Mansfield Park and is homesick. The house seems far too big; Sir Thomas is daunting, Lady Bertram silent, Mrs Norris oppressive and her four cousins (Tom, Edmund, Maria and Julia) are distant. Even the maidservants sneer at her clothes. Nobody puts "themselves out of their way to secure her comfort". She misses her brothers and sisters where she had value as playfellow, instructress, and nurse.

Fanny, who had been taught to read, write and do needlework but nothing more, now receives her education from Miss Lee in the school-room alongside Maria and Julia. In private the sisters think her 'prodigiously stupid' and make fun of her ignorance. Mrs Norris, who spoils the sisters, constantly emphasises Fanny's inferiority. Only Edmund attempts to understand her predicament. He befriends her, helps her adapt to her new life and guides her reading.

=== Character and psychological profile ===
Many gentle adjectives are used in the novel to describe Fanny - sweet, pretty, quiet, modest, timid, shy, graceful - but none describe the true character of Fanny who is clever, observant, strong-minded and practical. The young Fanny is seen as mentally and physically fragile, a vulnerable girl with low self-esteem and emotionally thin-skinned. The strength that has enabled her to survive is the love of her brother William, just one year older.

John Wiltshire says that, by the beginning of the 21st century, critics had come to appreciate Austen's highly sophisticated expression of her characters' psychological lives. They no longer understood Fanny as the pivot of moral right and, depending on their point of view, to be simply celebrated or berated. Instead they explored her psychological development, seeing her as 'a trembling, unstable entity, [an] erotically driven and conflicted figure, both victim and apostle of values inscribed within her by her history of adoption'.

Joan Klingel Ray suggests that Fanny Price is Austen's insightful study of "the battered-child syndrome", a victim of emotional and material abuse in both households.

== Growing into adulthood ==
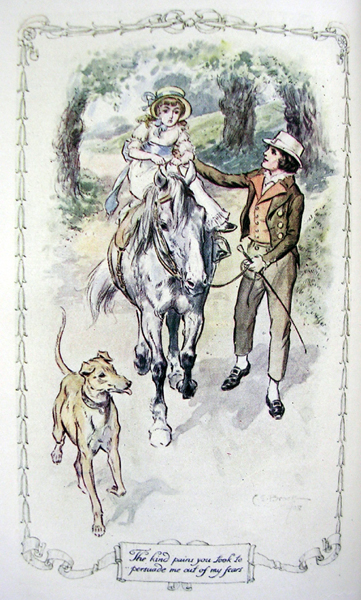
Fanny learning to ride one of Edmund's horses

=== Young adult ===
Colleen Sheehan offers a partial defence for the readers and scholars who dislike Fanny. She maintains that Austen deliberately makes the character of Fanny difficult to empathise with and that one has to work at liking her. Austen refuses to give the reader simplistic stereotypes that will allow of easy moral judgement. Beneath all the liveliness and wit of the charismatic Crawfords there is an intense spiritual and moral battle being waged against Fanny and Edmund. Austen encourages her readers to think for themselves, to exercise their own moral judgement in a complex world.

Once the governess, Miss Lee, has left, Fanny continues to find in Edmund a considerate companion who tries to protect her from discrimination within the family. In time she becomes romantically and jealously attracted to him, though in secret. Throughout the novel, Fanny is portrayed in the uncompromising position of loving without invitation and without hope.

As an eighteen year-old, Fanny is considered pretty but tires quickly, is shy, and is reluctant to give her own opinions or to assert herself. She enjoys nature, poetry and biography, especially Shakespeare, Crabbe and Cowper. Quoting later from William Cowper's Tirocinium, she also loves his extended poem, The Task. Over time, she becomes a skilled observer, listener and reflector. These skills prove to be useful in decision-making, winning people's confidence, and eventually, acting in support of others.

Thomas Edwards says that, compared to the other characters, Fanny alone has a full conscience, a sympathetic understanding of what other people feel. Fanny's natural sympathy is at times so intense that she is overwhelmed by the perceived needs of others. Her capacity for empathy also acts as a partial balance against her tendency towards being judgemental. She can feel compassion for Mrs Norris even when narrator and reader feel only condemnation. "Fanny's disposition was such that she could never even think of her aunt Norris in the meagerness and cheerlessness of her own small house, without reproaching herself for some little want of attention to her when they had been last together."

Fanny lives by the strict moral principles she has learned from Edmund and derived from Sir Thomas's worldview. This code embraces typical regency views of propriety and of a woman's place in the world. Rousseau depicted the ideal woman as fragile, submissive, and physically weak, a view frequently reiterated in a young woman's reading matter. Fanny, with her constant illnesses, timid disposition, submissiveness and fragility, conforms outwardly to Rousseau's ideal woman. This leads some reviewers to consider Fanny priggish. Even Sheehan, who is deeply sympathetic to Fanny, describes her as pure, poor, plain, timid, sickly and without wit, and also rather prudish. Kingsley Amis described her as "morally detestable". Other critics, like Claire Tomalin, point out that she is a complex personality, perceptive yet given to wishful thinking, and that she shows courage and grows in self-esteem during the latter part of the story. While faithful to the moral code she has learned from Edmund, Fanny grows into an understanding which is deeper than that of her teacher. Her sufferings, her introspection, her integrity, her willfulness and her observation of human interactions lead her to unexpected conclusions. She has a core strength and In the end, Fanny unwittingly undermines prevailing attitudes to propriety, and finds inner resources to place conscience above obedience and love above duty.

=== The East Room ===
The school-room is later renamed the East Room by Maria, and once Miss Lee departs, it becomes vacant. Fanny gradually appropriates the room, filling it with her plants, her simple treasures and the books she buys once she has a little money of her own. It becomes her safe place, her 'nest of comforts' where, though unheated (by order of Mrs Norris) she retreats in times of stress. Here she reflects that, "though there had been sometimes much of suffering to her; though her motives had often been misunderstood, her feelings disregarded, and her comprehension undervalued; though she had known the pains of tyranny, of ridicule, and neglect, yet almost every recurrence of either had led to something consolatory", and the chief consolation had always been Edmund.

Described in greater detail than any other part of the house, the room has many objects with symbolic potential. The table set against the East wall and its window with its transparency of Tintern Abbey, is suggestive of a chapel, a place of meditation, of comfort and prayer, though, unlike the improving novels of many of Austen's contemporaries, personal prayer is rarely mentioned.

The trauma of her dislocation at the age of ten is recalled here by Fanny eight years later when she is promised a visit to her birth family. "The remembrance of all her earliest pleasures, and of what she had suffered in being torn from them, came over her with renewed strength, and it seemed as if to be at home again would heal every pain that had since grown out of the separation." John Wiltshire describes Fanny as, "a heroine damaged early by her upbringing, as well as by her quasi-adoption, who experiences intense conflict between gratitude to her adoptive family and the deepest rebellion against them", a rebellion scarcely conscious.

=== Arrivals and departures ===
When Fanny is fifteen, her uncle Norris, the local clergyman, dies. Led to believe that she will be moved from Mansfield Park and live with Mrs Norris, Fanny again experiences the trauma of dislocation and abandonment, although it soon becomes clear that Aunt Norris does not want Fanny living with her because of the additional expense.

The following year, Sir Thomas takes Tom to Antigua to deal with problems on his Caribbean estate, expecting to be away for about a year. His daughters do not grieve over his going, and Fanny only grieves that she cannot grieve. In his farewell private talk with Fanny, Sir Thomas encourages her to invite her brother William to visit but expresses the fear that William may see little improvement in her since they last met when she was ten. Her cousins, seeing Fanny's tears, misinterpret her pain and dismiss her as a hypocrite.

The wife of the new minister Dr Grant has a half-sister, Mary Crawford who comes to live with her at the parsonage, accompanied by her brother, Henry Crawford. Mary, first interested in Tom, soon finds herself attracted to Edmund, a matter which distresses Fanny.

=== Outing to Sotherton Court ===
On the family visit to Sotherton Court, Fanny, now aged eighteen, silently observes Henry flirting, first with Julia and then with Maria. She is particularly concerned for Maria who is already engaged to the young owner of Sotherton, the very wealthy but dull Mr Rushworth.

As Mrs Rushworth (widow of Mr Rushworth's father) takes the party on a conducted tour of the house, Mary Crawford learns for the first time that Edmund is to become a clergyman; Mary, Edmund and Fanny subsequently debate the merits of an ecclesiastical career.

David Monaghan, arguing for a conservative view of the novel, states that Fanny values what has emerged naturally over the centuries, that she alone is able to appreciate the charm of Sotherton as a great house despite its imperfections. She sees the house 'built in Elizabeth's time' as a symbol of tradition and when Mr Rushworth calls it as 'a dismal old prison' she defends the English idyllic society, despite in many ways being unequipped for the task. Warren Roberts sees in this debate an expression of the conflict between French atheism and English religion. He asserts that the character of Mary Crawford, whose 'French' irreverence has alienated her from church, is contrasted unfavourably with that of Fanny Price whose 'English' sobriety leads her to faith, a faith that asserts: "there is something in a chapel and chaplain so much in character with a great house, with one's idea of what such a household should be".

The young people exploit Sotherton's allegorical potential, particularly in the garden and the wilderness. Henry, looking across the locked gate by the ha-ha says, "You have a very smiling scene before you". Maria responds, "Do you mean literally or figuratively?" She complains of being trapped behind the gate and having "a feeling of restraint and hardship". The dialogue is full of innuendo. Fanny, also present, urges Maria not to climb the gate, warning of spikes, a torn garment and a fall, all unconsciously suggestive of moral violence. Lucy Worsley calls this Austen's most striking incidence of phallic symbolism.

== Home theatricals ==
While Sir Thomas is still in Antigua, the elder son, Tom, recently returned to England, and influenced by his new friend, Mr. Yates, decides that the young people should entertain themselves with amateur theatricals. All apart from Fanny and Edmund are enthusiastic and after several days of discussion and argument the play Lovers' Vows is chosen. On reading the script, Fanny is astonished that the play should be thought suitable for private theatre and considers the two leading female roles as "totally improper for home representation — the situation of one, and the language of the other so unfit to be expressed by any woman of modesty". She believes from her observations of the household that the acting will have a negative impact on the emotions and subsequent behaviour of the actors. However, she lacks the strength and courage to persuade the others.

When Tom and Mr Yates suggest bringing in an outsider to act, Edmund is even more distressed. He is concerned about Sir Thomas' sense of propriety which abhors any invasion of privacy. He also dislikes the thought of a stranger performing an intimate scene with Mary Crawford and so reluctantly accepts the part himself. Fanny is disturbed by Edmund's change of mind, though others gloat. But despite being pressed, Fanny continues in her refusal to act. However, she agrees to be a prompter and becomes very involved. During rehearsals, Fanny observes the ongoing flirtation between Henry and the about-to-be-married Maria, "Maria acted well, too well." She also sees the sexual tension and attraction between Edmund and Mary as they play the part of the two lovers. Fanny's jealousy prompts much of the novel's dynamic.

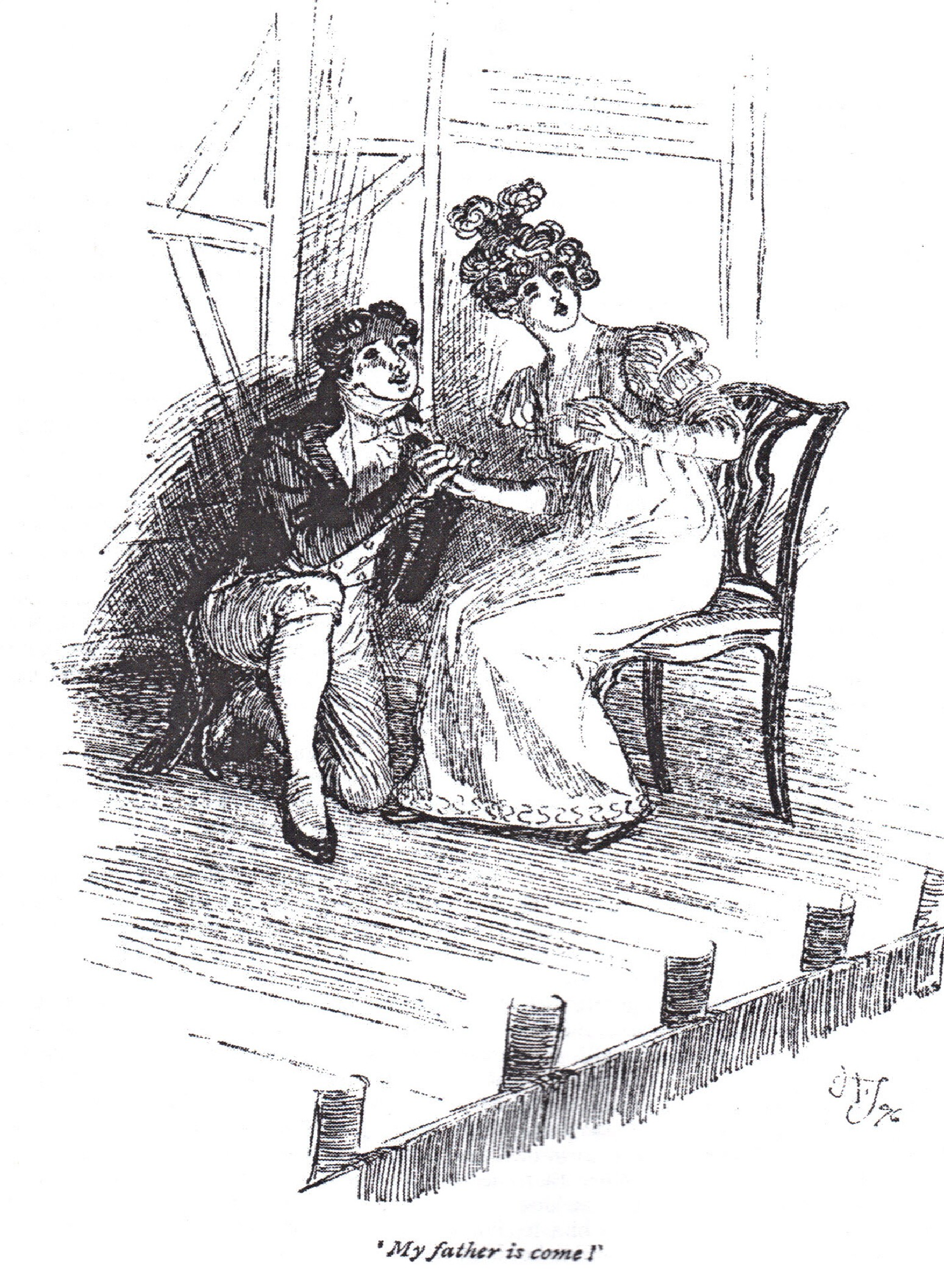
The actors are shocked to hear that Sir Thomas has returned to England and is already in the house.

=== The master returns ===
Some commentators see an allusion to the judgement parables of the Gospels as the young people entertain themselves during Sir Thomas's absence. In the parables, the Day of Judgement comes when least expected so hearers are warned to be obedient, faithful and alert, always ready for the master's return. On what turns out to be the final rehearsal, the door of the room is thrown open, and Julia, with face aghast, exclaims, "My father is come!". For the first readers, this cliff-hanger marks the end of volume one. The story resumes with consternation, each person feeling it "most unwelcome, most ill-timed, most appalling". Every heart is sinking under some degree of self-condemnation or undefined alarm, "What will become of us? What is to be done now?" '... and terrible to every ear were the corroborating sounds of opening doors and passing footsteps.' For half a minute, there is complete silence. Julia, the first to speak, declares self-righteously, "I need not be afraid of appearing before him." Fanny herself is full of fear, though Edmund later informs Sir Thomas, "All of us have been more or less to blame, except Fanny." Sir Thomas greets his family warmly. When he finally learns of their activity he is upset, puts an end to the play, but deals with them gently.

=== Slave trade ===
It is generally assumed that Mansfield Park, being a newly built property, had been erected on the proceeds of the British slave trade. Fanny asks Sir Thomas about the slave trade but receives no answer. The pregnant silence (underlined the following day in conversation with Edmund) perplexed Fanny and continues to perplex critics. Austen here, as often in the novel, raises moral questions but invites the reader to make their own judgement. Claire Tomalin, following the literary critic, Brian Southam, argues that in questioning her uncle about the slave trade, the usually timid Fanny shows that her vision of the trade's immorality is clearer than his. Fanny (like Austen) favours the poet William Cowper, who was a passionate abolitionist and often wrote poems on the subject. His most notable work, The Task was an assault on contemporary society, condemning the slave trade, French despotism, fashionable manners and lukewarm clergymen, all matters of concern to Austen.

== Assault ==
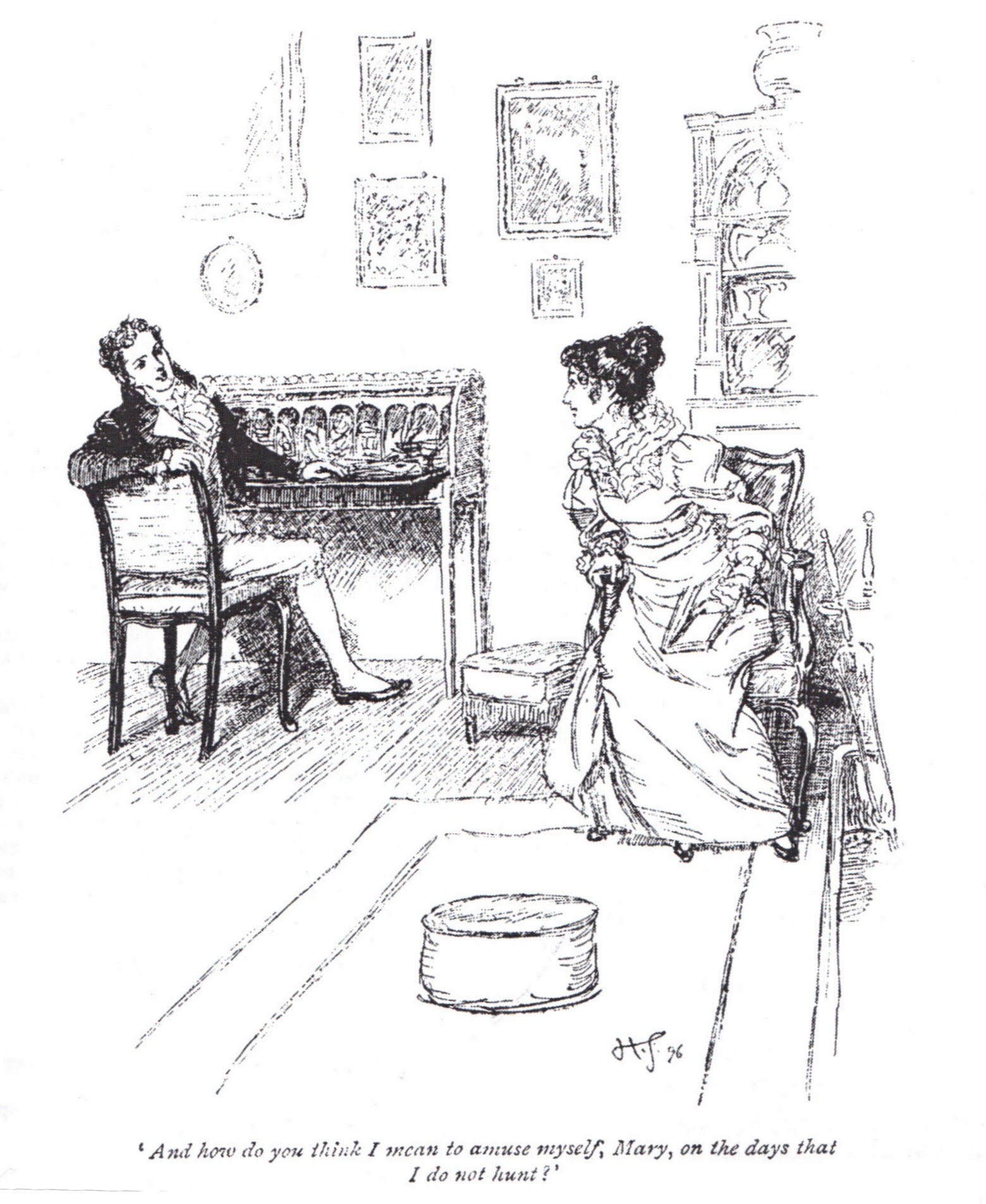
Henry tells Mary of his plan to seduce Fanny

=== Flirtation ===
Henry Crawford returns some time after Maria's marriage to Mr Rushworth. For Henry, as for Mary, sexual conquest is the motivating force in a romantic relationship. Henry decides to 'make a hole in Miss Price's heart' simply because he thinks he can. He pretends to court Fanny, showing her attention and kindness. Fanny does not appreciate his attentions. She has a bad opinion of Henry's character, believing he has no principles. Sir Thomas, observing Henry's behaviour and failing to recognise his flaws, starts to think Henry might be in love with Fanny and approves. Henry shocks his sister by declaring that he has fallen in love with Fanny and speaks of her sweet conduct and forbearance. Mary identifies the only real attraction for Henry as Fanny's resistance to his charms, but begins to think he might truly be in love. Mary's attitude to Fanny now becomes ambivalent and she colludes with Henry in his attempted conquest of her.

=== Coming out ===
Fanny's 'coming out' ball, is the culmination of Sir Thomas' growing endorsement, following his return from Antigua. It begins when he gives her permission to attend the Grant's dinner party at the parsonage and makes his carriage available to her, despite Mrs Norris' objections.

Henry dances with Fanny at the ball, and later, by using his uncle's influence, tries to gain her favour by facilitating the promotion of William to lieutenant in the Royal Navy. But when he proposes to Fanny, she rejects him. Apart from Henry's persistence, she has to cope with Sir Thomas' angry reaction. Fanny cannot tell of her secret love for Edmund and she is not willing to harm Maria and Julia by revealing Henry Crawford's scandalous behaviour towards them. Fanny is further isolated when Edmund fails to support her. Austen biographer Claire Tomalin argues that "it is in rejecting obedience in favour of the higher dictate of remaining true to her own conscience that Fanny rises to her moment of heroism."

== Trauma and restoration ==
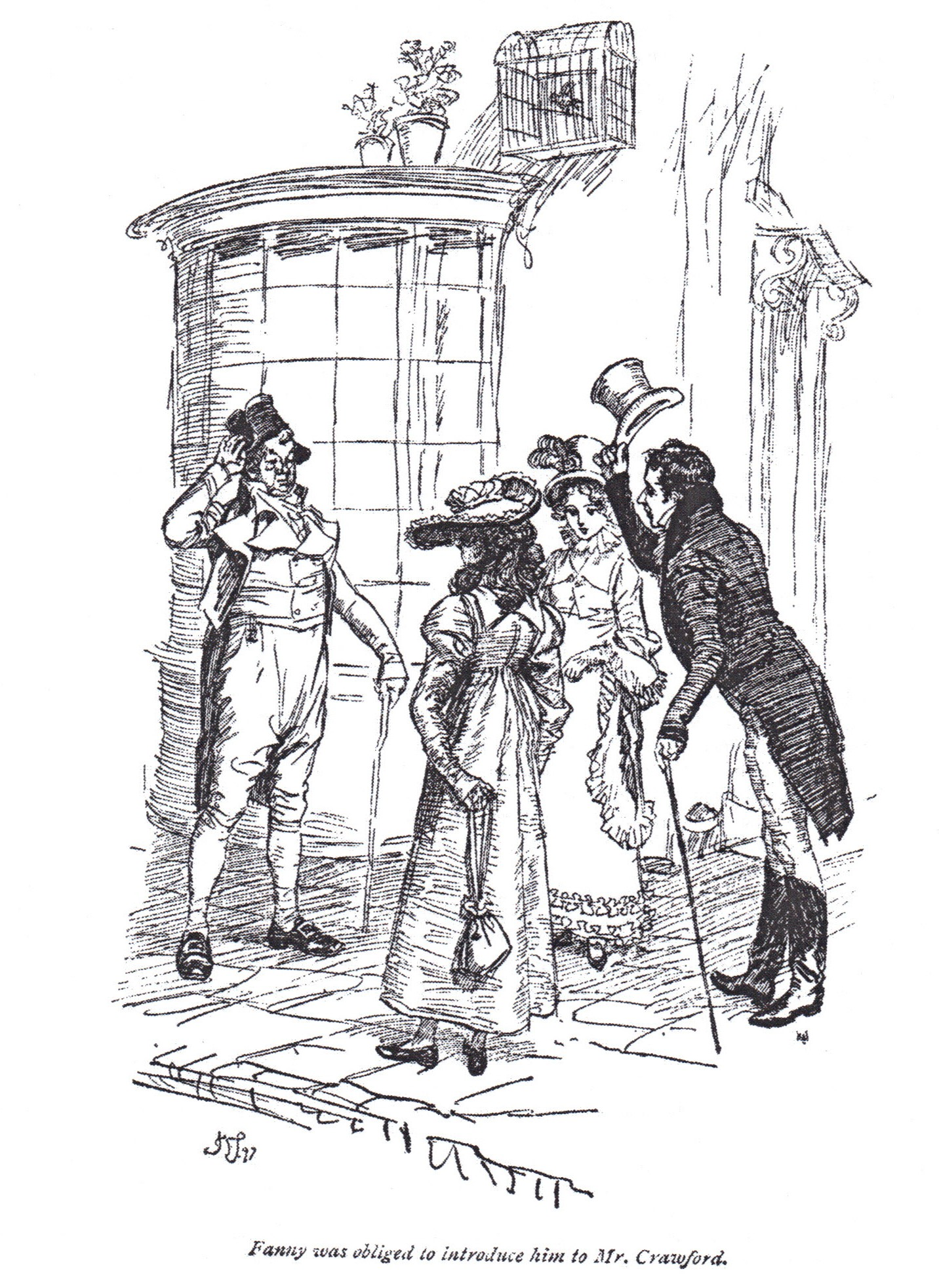
Fanny, accompanied by her younger sister, introduces Henry to her father

=== Portsmouth ===
Sir Thomas sends Fanny back to her family in Portsmouth so that she can better understand the benefits of what he believes to be an ideal match. Fanny anticipates this visit with excitement but soon realises that her memories of Portsmouth have been greatly idealised. In a conversation with Mary the previous autumn, Fanny had ruminated on the mystery and unpredictability of memory. Now, surrounded by the chaos of the Price household, she longs to return to Mansfield, her memories again transformed.

Change in Fanny's character is most marked during her three months exposure to Portsmouth life. As she reassesses her own abilities, she realises she is capable of seeing and judging correctly, of giving, and of being positively useful. Symbolically a descent into hell, Portsmouth life becomes an opportunity for change and growth. One Saturday morning, nearly four weeks after her arrival, Fanny receives an unexpected visit from Henry. He treats her chaotic family with apparent respect; his love for her seems constant. While still refusing Henry, she begins to think about him a little more favourably; while Fanny has seen some seemingly positive change in his character, she has not seen enough to feel that it will be permanent or enough to revise her previous opinion of him, which later proves to be valid.

Some time later however, Mr Price, reads in his borrowed newspaper that Henry and Maria have eloped. Fanny learns more from letters sent by Mary and later Edmund: Henry has fulfilled her worst fears about him. Fanny is eventually brought back by Edmund to a traumatised Mansfield Park. She has the experience and inner strength to weather the trauma and becomes chief support to the family. She is welcomed as comforter to Aunt Bertram, listener to Edmund in his disappointed assessment of Mary, and increasingly as a special friend to Sir Thomas.

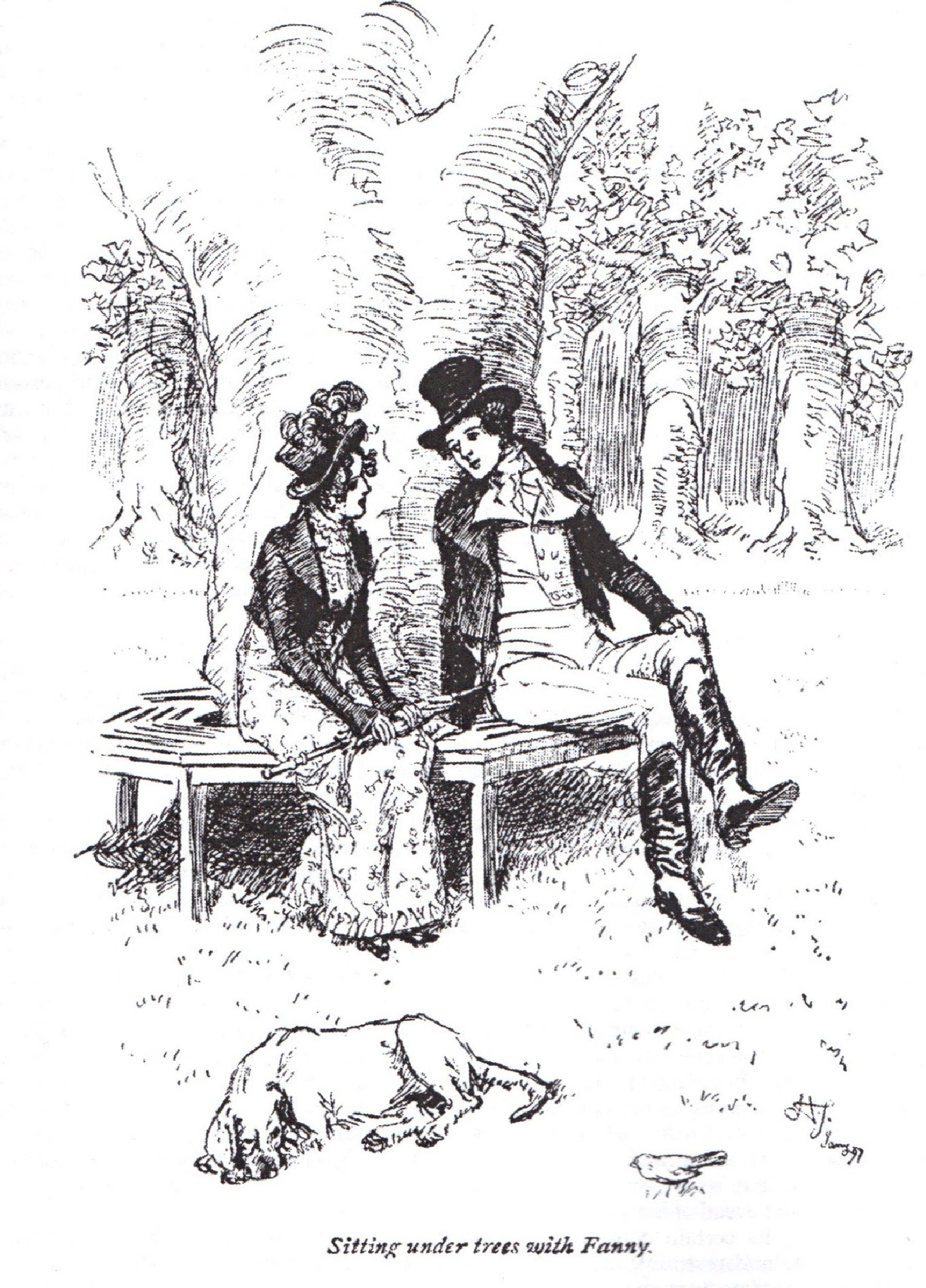
Edmund unburdens himself to Fanny

Susan Morgan says that Fanny, though a flawed heroine, possesses "the energy, open to us all, to struggle against selfishness, toward self-knowledge and that generosity of mind which should illuminate our view of the people around us." Fanny's principal virtue is that of 'growing worth', her ability to understand the world around her, to use her reason, to care about others, to change yet remain true to herself.

=== The ending ===
Sir Thomas takes a long time to recover, examining his conscience and past motives. As he regains confidence, he comes to depend more on Fanny, treating her as a much loved daughter. Byrne finds in Mansfield Park an exploration of the role of parents in raising their children and forming their moral characters. Over time, Sir Thomas has gradually changed his view of his niece. At first he felt that she was not the social equal of his daughters. At the end, he acknowledges her advantages in starting from hardship in her parents' home, and recognises his failings in guiding his own daughters. Over time, Edmund proposes to Fanny and is delighted to find that she has always loved him.

Austen's sister, Cassandra, thought Fanny should have married Henry, but despite their arguing about the matter, Jane stood firm. At the end of the book, the narrator suggests that if Henry had been more patient, Fanny would probably have accepted him. Additionally, Edmund, whom she longed to marry, might have married Mary, had Mary not destroyed her own reputation by attempting to justify her brother's scandalous affair. Some commentators, like Thomas Edwards, see this as a rare weakness in the text, believing that if Fanny had accepted Henry, the narcissistic regency rake would have soon lost interest and turned his attentions elsewhere. In the text, Mary speculates that if they had married, Henry would have satisfied himself with the occasional dalliance.

Colleen Sheehan concludes that "just as Fanny tries to remain a bystander to the production of Lovers' Vows but is drawn into the action, we the audience of bystanders are drawn into participation in the drama of Mansfield Park. Austen does not save Henry and Mary Crawford in this work; only they could save themselves. Neither does she save her readers. Our judgement must be our own."

== See also ==
- Who is Fanny Price?, an analysis of the character
