= Rhapsody in Blue =

1924 composition by George Gershwin

- by George Gershwin
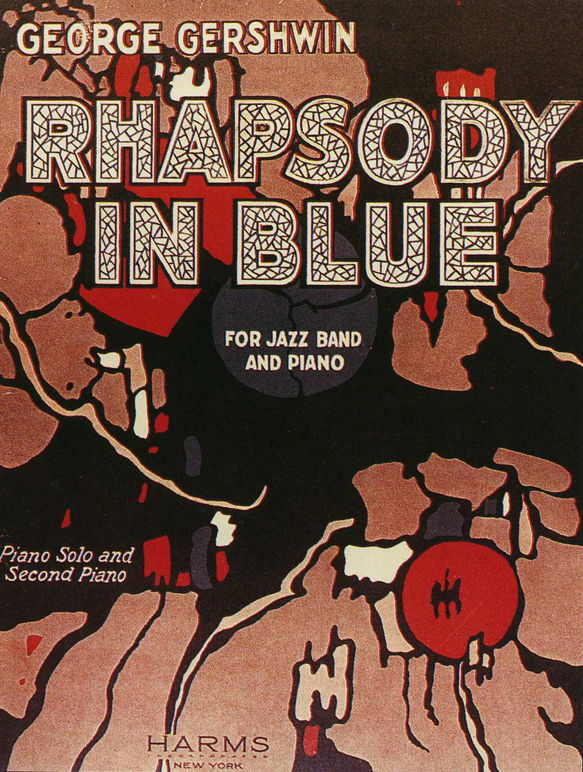
- Cover of the original sheet music of Rhapsody in Blue
- Genre: Orchestral jazz
- Form: Rhapsody
- Composed: January 1924
- Published: June 12, 1924 Harms, Inc.

Premiere
- Date: February 12, 1924
- Location: Aeolian Hall, New York City, US
- Conductor: Paul Whiteman
- Performers: George Gershwin (piano); Ross Gorman (clarinet); Ferde Grofé (orchestrator)

Audio sample
- The United States Marine Band's 2018 performance of the 1924 jazz band version, with pianist Bramwell Tovey: file; help

Rhapsody in Blue is a 1924 musical composition for solo piano and jazz band by George Gershwin. Commissioned by bandleader Paul Whiteman, the work combines elements of classical music with jazz-influenced effects and premiered in a concert titled "An Experiment in Modern Music" on February 12, 1924, in Aeolian Hall, New York City. Whiteman's band performed the rhapsody with Gershwin playing the piano. Whiteman's arranger Ferde Grofé orchestrated the rhapsody several times, including the 1924 original scoring, the 1926 pit orchestra scoring, and the 1942 symphonic scoring.

The rhapsody is one of Gershwin's most recognizable creations and a key composition that defined the Jazz Age. Gershwin's piece inaugurated a new era in America's musical history, established his reputation as an eminent composer, and became one of the most popular of all concert works. In the American Heritage magazine, Frederic D. Schwarz posits that the famous opening clarinet glissando has become as instantly recognizable to concert audiences as the opening of Beethoven's Fifth Symphony.

== History ==
=== Commission ===
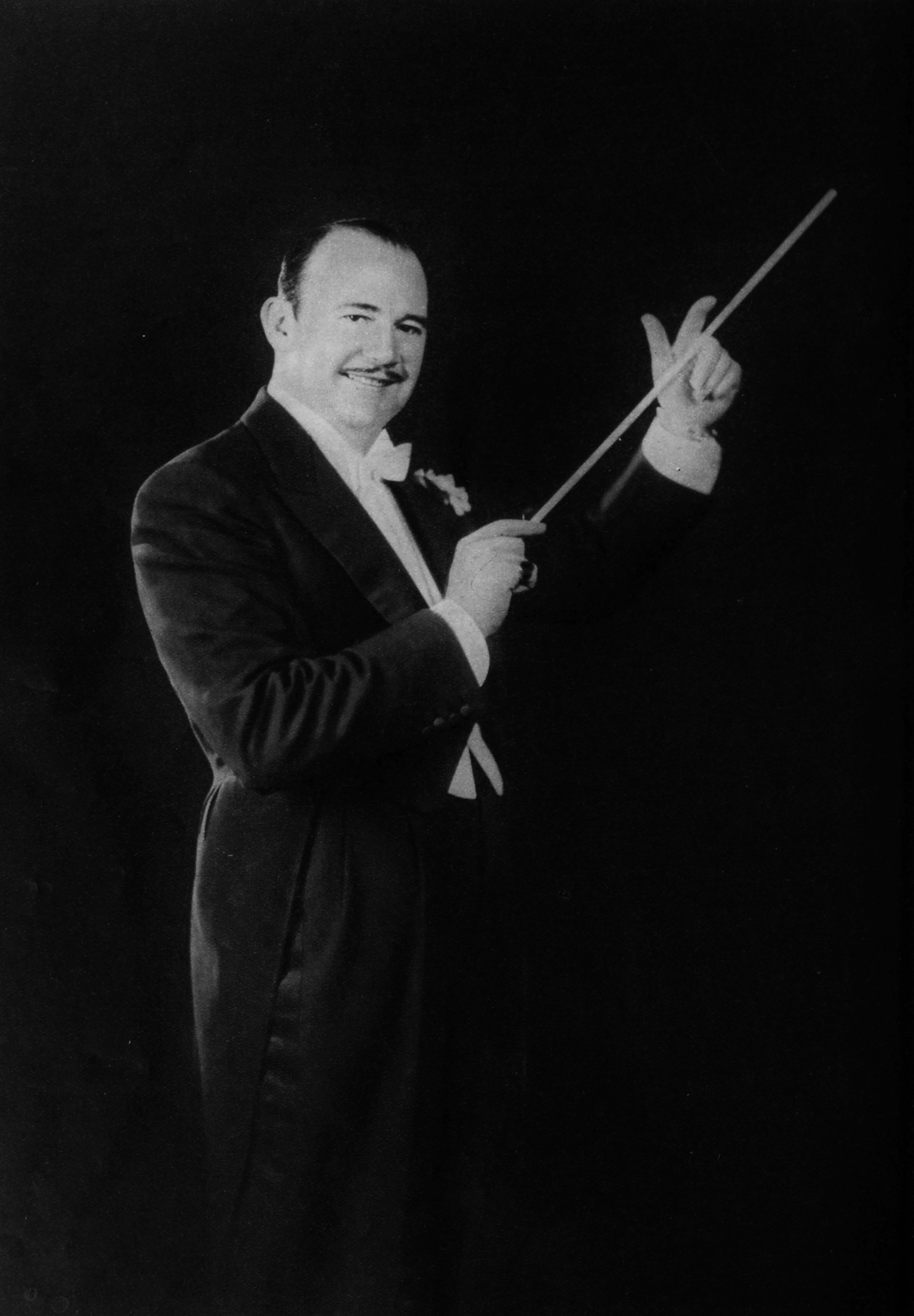
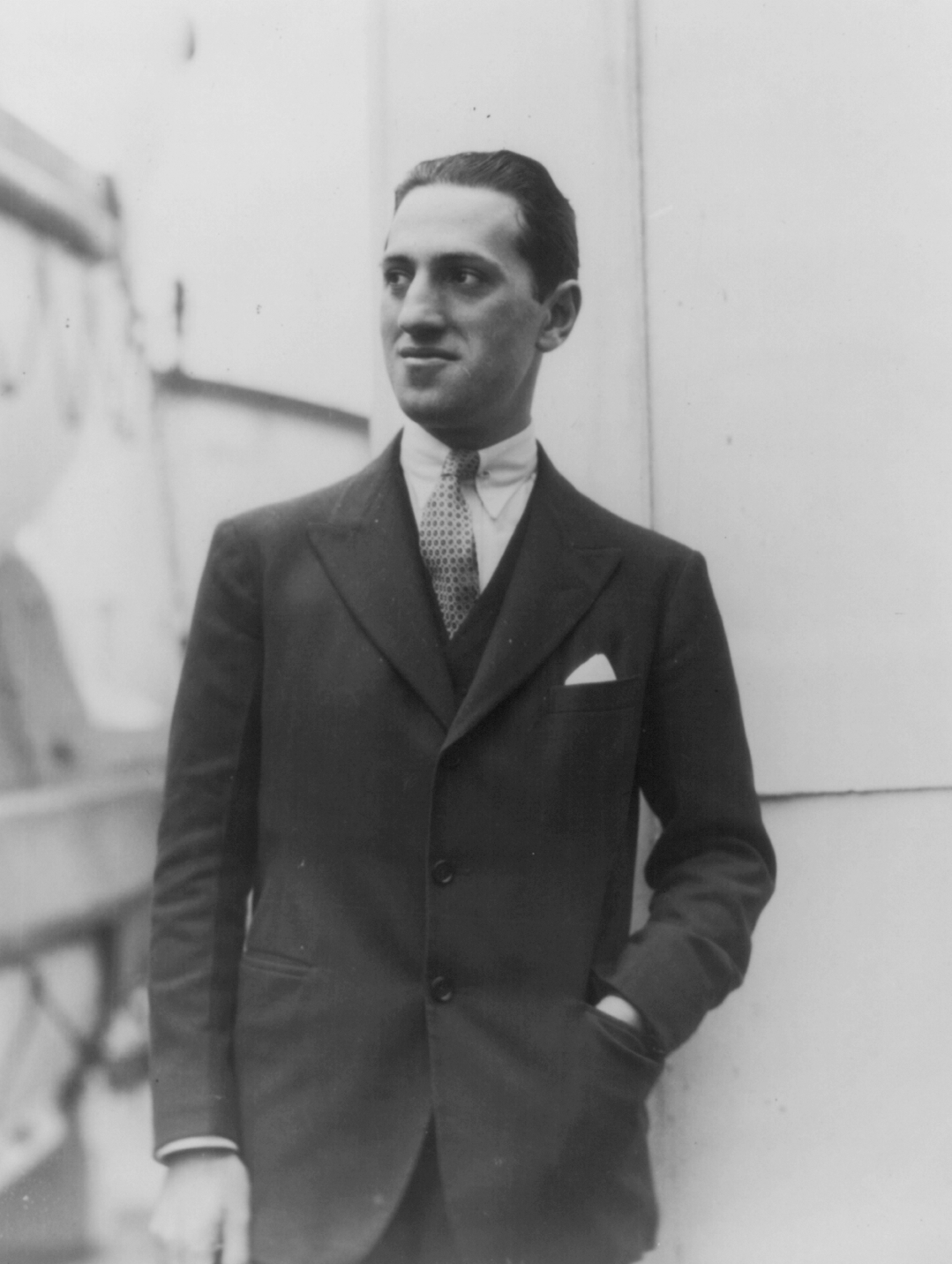
Bandleader Paul Whiteman (left) and composer George Gershwin (right)

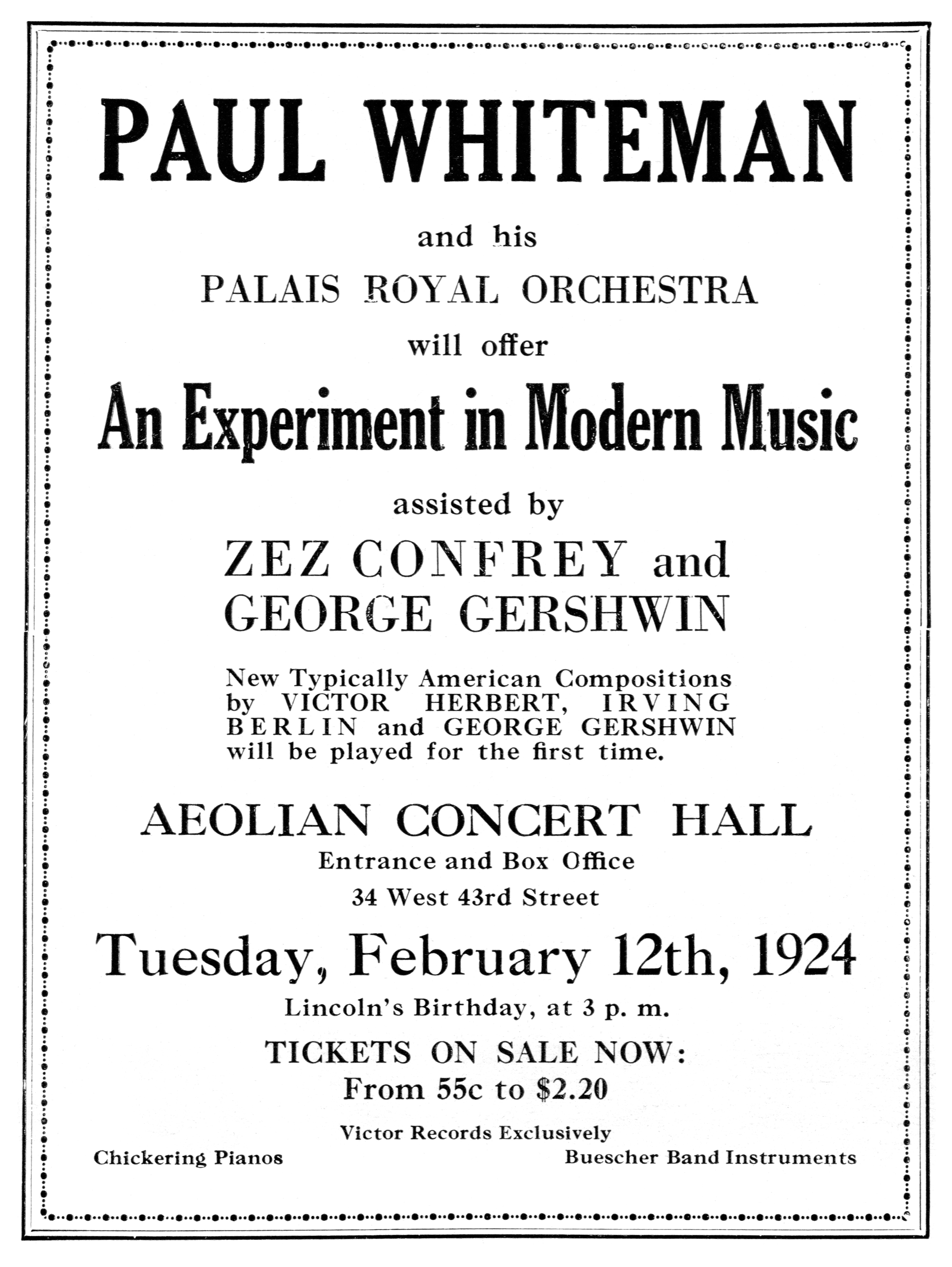
Advertisement for An Experiment in Modern Music in the March 1924 issue of Theatre Magazine

Following the success of an experimental classical-jazz concert held with Canadian singer Éva Gauthier in New York City on November 1, 1923, bandleader Paul Whiteman decided to attempt a more ambitious feat. He asked composer George Gershwin to write a concerto-like piece for an all-jazz concert in honor of Lincoln's Birthday to be given at Aeolian Hall. Whiteman became fixated upon performing such an extended composition by Gershwin after he collaborated with him in The Scandals of 1922. He had been especially impressed by Gershwin's one-act "jazz opera" Blue Monday. Gershwin initially declined Whiteman's request on the grounds that he would have insufficient time to compose the work and the score would likely need to be revised.

Soon after, on the evening of January 3, George Gershwin and lyricist Buddy DeSylva played a game of billiards at the Ambassador Billiard Parlor at Broadway and 52nd Street in Manhattan. George's brother, Ira Gershwin, interrupted their billiard game to read aloud the January 4 edition of the New-York Tribune. An unsigned Tribune article entitled "What Is American Music?" about an upcoming Whiteman concert had caught Ira's attention. The article falsely declared that George Gershwin had begun "work on a jazz concerto" for Whiteman's concert.

The news announcement puzzled Gershwin, as he had politely declined to compose any such work for Whiteman. In a telephone conversation with Whiteman the next morning, Whiteman informed Gershwin that Whiteman's arch rival Vincent Lopez planned to steal the idea of his experimental concert and there was no time to lose. Whiteman thus finally persuaded Gershwin to compose the piece.

=== Composition ===
With only five weeks remaining until the premiere, Gershwin hurriedly set about composing the work. He later claimed that while on a train journey to Boston, the thematic seeds for Rhapsody in Blue began to germinate in his mind. He told biographer Isaac Goldberg in 1931:

It was on the train, with its steely rhythms, its rattle-ty bang, that is so often so stimulating to a composer ... I frequently hear music in the very heart of the noise. And there I suddenly heard—and even saw on paper—the complete construction of the rhapsody, from beginning to end. No new themes came to me, but I worked on the thematic material already in my mind and tried to conceive the composition as a whole. I heard it as a sort of musical kaleidoscope of America, of our vast melting pot, of our unduplicated national pep, of our metropolitan madness. By the time I reached Boston, I had a definite plot of the piece, as distinguished from its actual substance.

Gershwin began composing on January 7 as dated on the original manuscript for two pianos. He tentatively entitled the piece as American Rhapsody during its composition. Ira Gershwin suggested the revised title of Rhapsody in Blue after his visit to a gallery exhibition of James McNeill Whistler paintings, which had titles such as Nocturne in Black and Gold: The Falling Rocket and Arrangement in Grey and Black. After a few weeks, Gershwin finished his composition and passed the score, titled A Rhapsody in Blue, to Ferde Grofé, Whiteman's arranger. Grofé finished orchestrating the piece on February 4—a mere eight days before the premiere.

=== Premiere ===
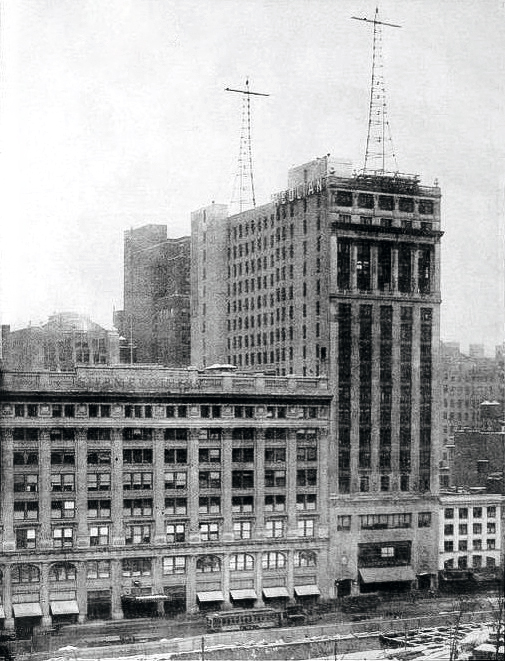
The Rhapsody premiered on a snowy afternoon at Aeolian Hall, Manhattan, pictured here in 1923.

Rhapsody in Blue premiered during a snowy Tuesday afternoon on February 12, 1924, at Aeolian Hall, Manhattan. Entitled "An Experiment in Modern Music", the much-anticipated concert held by Paul Whiteman and his Palais Royal Orchestra drew a packed house. The excited audience consisted of "vaudevillians, concert managers come to have a look at the novelty, Tin Pan Alleyites, composers, symphony and opera stars, flappers, cake-eaters, all mixed up higgledy-piggledy." A number of influential figures of the era were present, including Carl Van Vechten, Marguerite d'Alvarez, Victor Herbert, Walter Damrosch, and Willie "the Lion" Smith.

In a preconcert lecture, Whiteman's manager, Hugh C. Ernst, proclaimed the purpose of the concert to be "purely educational". Whiteman had selected the music to exemplify the "melodies, harmony, and rhythms which agitate the throbbing emotional resources of this young restless age." The concert's lengthy program listed 26 separate musical movements, divided into two parts and 11 sections, bearing titles such as "True Form of Jazz" and "Contrast—Legitimate Scoring vs. Jazzing". The program's schedule featured Gershwin's rhapsody as merely the penultimate piece, which preceded Elgar's Pomp and Circumstance March No. 1.

Many of the early numbers in the program underwhelmed the audience, and the ventilation system in the concert hall malfunctioned. Some audience members had departed the venue by the time Gershwin made his inconspicuous entrance for the rhapsody. The audience purportedly was irritable, impatient, and restless until the haunting clarinet glissando played the opening notes of Rhapsody in Blue. The distinctive glissando had been created quite by happenstance during rehearsals:

As a joke on Gershwin ... [Ross] Gorman [Whiteman's virtuoso clarinetist] played the opening measure with a noticeable glissando, 'stretching' the notes out and adding what he considered a jazzy, humorous touch to the passage. Reacting favorably to Gorman's whimsy, Gershwin asked him to perform the opening measure that way ... and to add as much of a 'wail' as possible.

Whiteman's orchestra performed the rhapsody with "twenty-three musicians in the ensemble" and George Gershwin on piano. In characteristic style, Gershwin chose to partially improvise his piano solo. The orchestra anxiously waited for Gershwin's nod, which signaled the end of his piano solo and the cue for the ensemble to resume playing. As Gershwin did not write the solo piano section until after the concert, exactly how the original rhapsody sounded at the premiere remains unknown.

=== Audience reaction and success ===
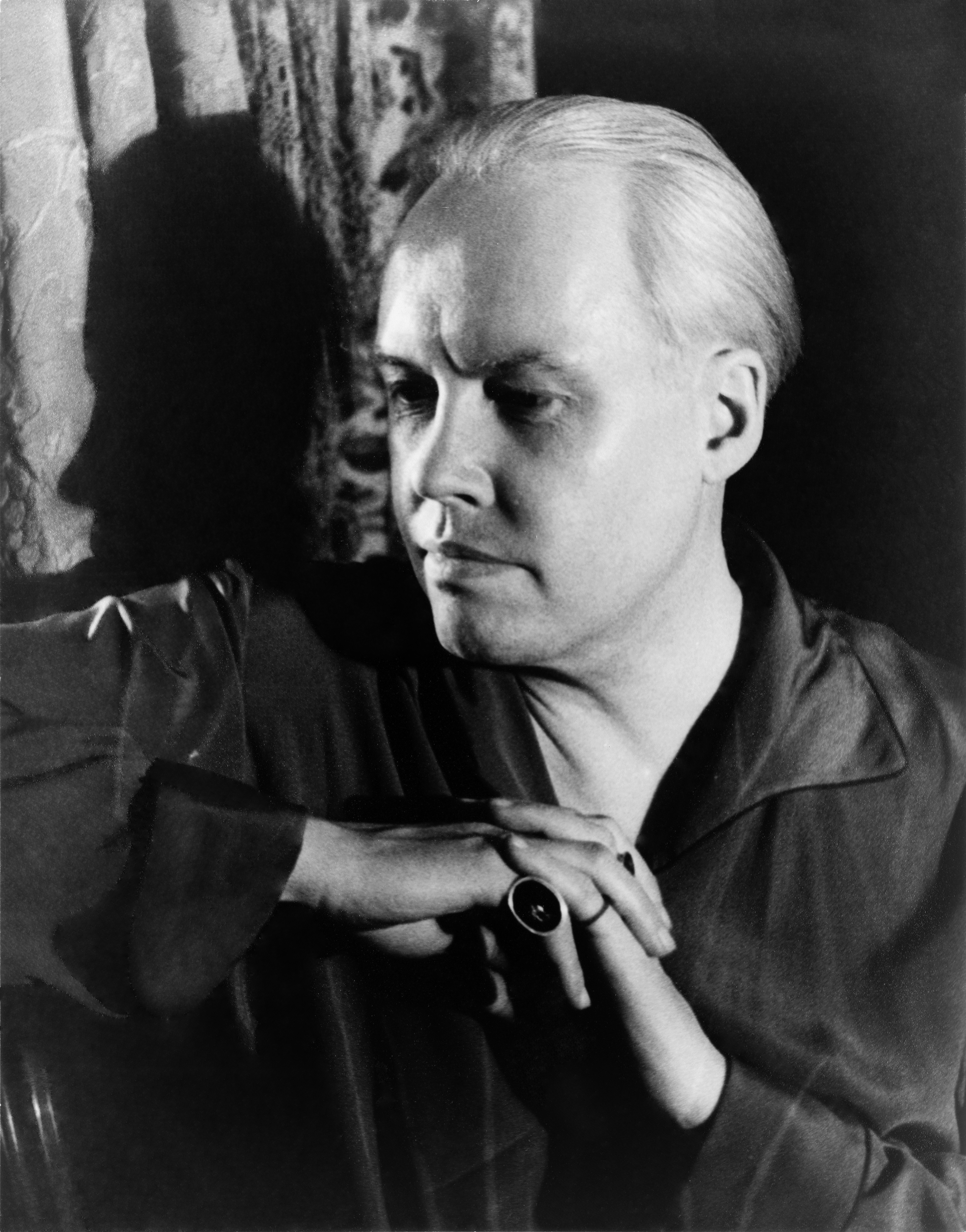
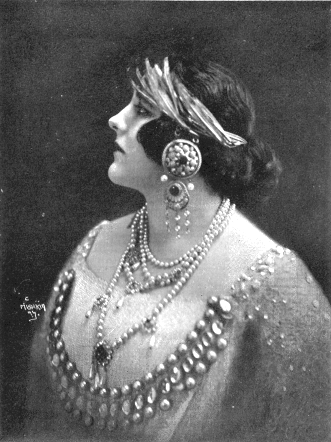
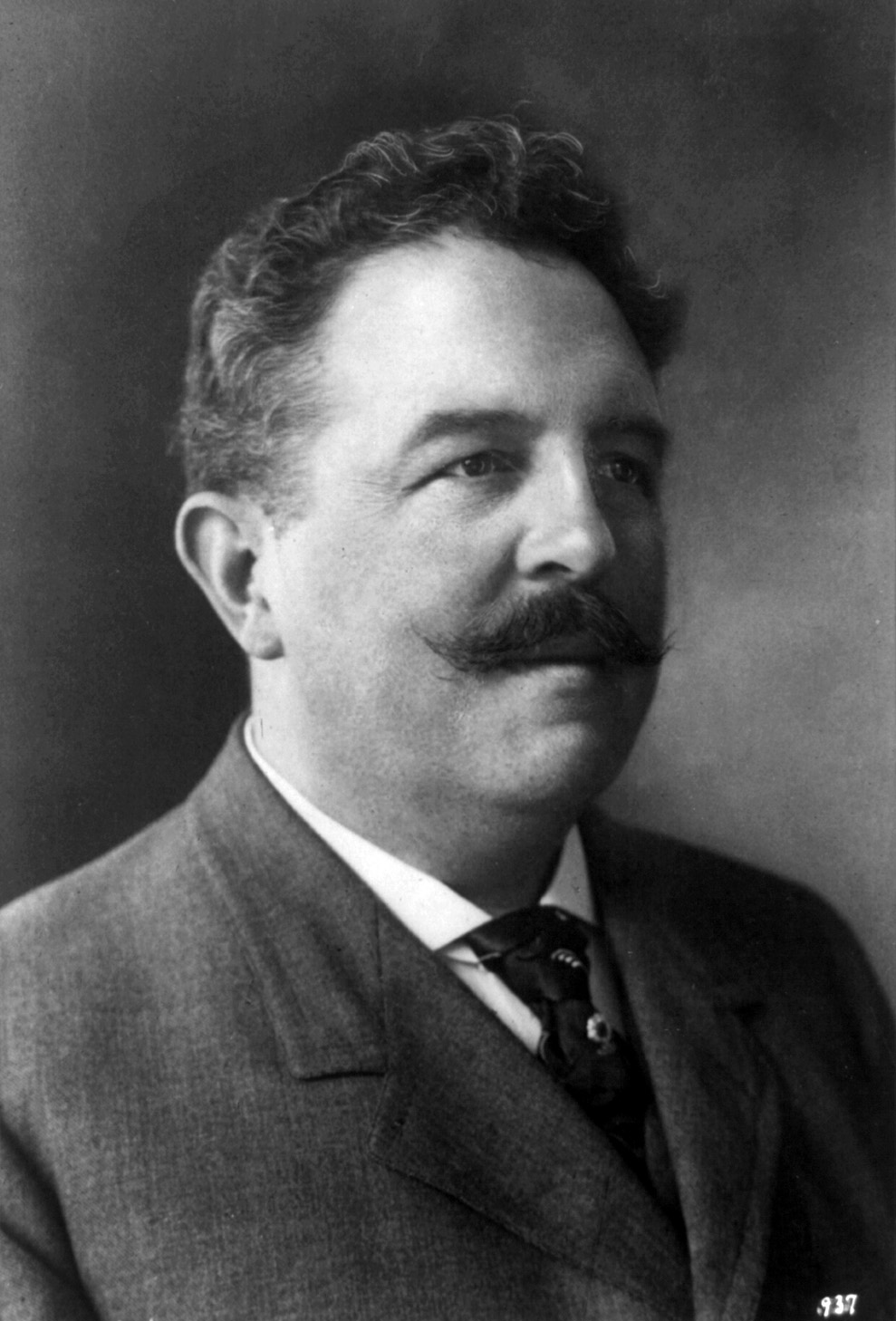
Carl Van Vechten, Marguerite d'Alvarez, and Victor Herbert were among the many eminent persons in the audience.

Upon the conclusion of the rhapsody, the audience tumultuously applauded Gershwin's composition, and quite unexpectedly, "the concert, in every respect but the financial, (Note: Paul Whiteman gave away free tickets to promote the concert and lost money. He expended $11,000, and the concert netted $4,000.) became a 'knockout'." The concert soon became historically significant due to the premiere of the rhapsody, and its program would "become not only a historic document, finding its way into foreign monographs on jazz, but a rarity, as well."

Following the success of the rhapsody's premiere, future performances followed. The first British performance of Rhapsody in Blue took place at the Savoy Hotel in London on June 15, 1925. The BBC broadcast the performance in a live relay. Debroy Somers conducted the Savoy Orpheans with Gershwin himself at the piano. Audiences heard the piece again in the United Kingdom during the second European tour of the Paul Whiteman Orchestra, most notably on April 11, 1926, at the Royal Albert Hall, with Gershwin in the audience. The Gramophone Company recorded this performance but the records were not issued.

By the end of 1927, Whiteman's band had performed Rhapsody in Blue around 84 times, and its recording sold a million copies. For the entire piece to fit onto two sides of a 12-inch record, the rhapsody had to be played at a faster speed than usual in a concert, which gave the recording a hurried feel with noticeably lost rubato. Whiteman later adopted the piece as his band's theme song and opened his radio programs with the slogan "Everything new but the Rhapsody in Blue."

=== Critical response ===
"This composition shows extraordinary talent, as it shows a young composer with aims that go far beyond those of his ilk, struggling with a form of which he is far from being master ... In spite of all this, he has expressed himself in a significant and, on the whole, highly original form ... His first theme ... is no mere dance-tune ... it is an idea, or several ideas, correlated and combined in varying and contrasting rhythms that immediately intrigue the listener. The second theme is more after the manner of some of Mr. Gershwin's colleagues. Tuttis are too long, cadenzas are too long, the peroration at the end loses a large measure of the wildness and magnificence it could easily have had if it were more broadly prepared, and, for all that, the audience was stirred and many a hardened concertgoer excited with the sensation of a new talent finding its voice."

— Olin Downes, The New York Times, February 1924

In contrast to the warm reception by concert audiences, music critics gave the rhapsody mixed reviews. Samuel Chotzinoff, music critic of the New York World, conceded that Gershwin's composition had "made an honest woman out of jazz", while Henrietta Strauss of The Nation opined that Gershwin had "added a new chapter to our musical history." Olin Downes, reviewing the concert in The New York Times, favorably noted the rhapsody as a "highly original form", and the composer as a "new talent finding its voice."

Nonetheless, other reviewers were less positive. Pitts Sanborn declared that the rhapsody "begins with a promising theme well stated" yet "soon runs off into empty passage-work and meaningless repetition." A number of reviews were particularly negative. Lawrence Gilman—a Richard Wagner enthusiast who would later write a devastating review of Gershwin's Porgy and Bess—harshly criticized the rhapsody as "derivative", "stale", and "inexpressive" in a New-York Tribune review on February 13, 1924.

Overall, professional music critics recurrently criticized Gershwin's piece as essentially formless and asserted that the composer had haphazardly glued melodic segments together.

==== Retrospective reviews ====
Years after its premiere, Rhapsody in Blue continued to divide music critics principally due to its perceived melodic incoherence. Constant Lambert, a British composer whose oeuvre often incorporated jazz elements, openly dismissed the work:

The composer [George Gershwin], trying to write a Lisztian concerto in a jazz style, has used only the non-barbaric elements in dance music, the result being neither good jazz nor good Liszt, and in no sense of the word a good concerto.

In an article in The Atlantic Monthly in 1955, Leonard Bernstein, who nevertheless admitted that he adored the piece, stated:

Rhapsody in Blue is not a real composition in the sense that whatever happens in it must seem inevitable, or even pretty inevitable. You can cut out parts of it without affecting the whole in any way except to make it shorter. You can remove any of these stuck-together sections and the piece still goes on as bravely as before. You can even interchange these sections with one another and no harm done. You can make cuts within a section, or add new cadenzas, or play it with any combination of instruments or on the piano alone; it can be a five-minute piece or a six-minute piece or a twelve-minute piece. And in fact, all these things are being done to it every day. It's still the Rhapsody in Blue.

== Orchestration ==
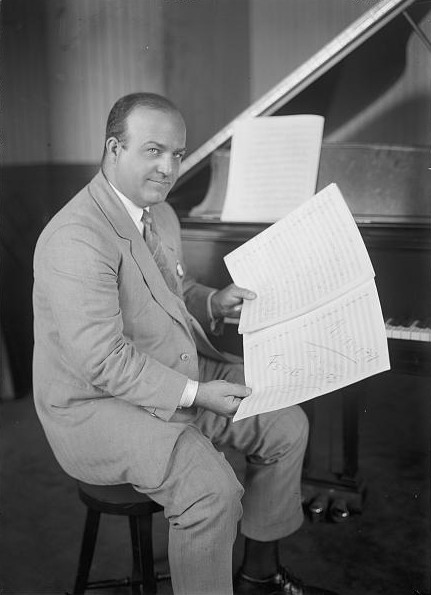
Ferde Grofé, Whiteman's chief arranger from 1920 to 1932, created the first arrangement of Gershwin's Rhapsody in Blue.

As Gershwin did not have sufficient knowledge of orchestration in 1924, Whiteman's pianist and chief arranger Ferde Grofé played a key role in the rhapsody's meteoric success, and scholars have contended that Grofé's arrangements of the Rhapsody secured its place in American culture. Gershwin's biographer, Isaac Goldberg, noted in 1931 that Grofé played a crucial role in the premiere's triumph:

In the heat of the occasion, the contribution of Ferdie Grofé, the arranger on the Whiteman staff who had scored the Rhapsody in ten days, was overlooked or ignored. It is true that an appreciable part of the scoring had been indicated by Gershwin; nevertheless, the contribution of Grofé was of prime importance, not only to the composition, but [also] to the jazz scoring of the immediate future.

Grofé hastily arranged the famous 1924 score to take full advantage of the Whiteman orchestra's particular strengths. He developed this orchestration for solo piano and Whiteman's 23 musicians. For the reeds section, Ross Gorman (Reed I) played oboe, heckelphone, and B♭, E♭, alto, and bass clarinets, as well as sopranino, soprano, and alto saxophones; Donald Clark (Reed II) played soprano, alto, and baritone saxophones, and Hale Byers (Reed III) played soprano, tenor, and baritone saxophones, as well as flute.

For the brass section, two trumpets were played by Henry Busse and Frank Siegrist; two French horns were played by Arturo Cerino and Al Corral; two trombones were played by Roy Maxon and James Casseday, and a tuba and a double bass were played by Guss Helleburg and Alus Armer, respectively. The rest of the ensemble included a drum set, timpani, and a glockenspiel played by George Marsh; one piano typically played by either Ferde Grofé or Henry Lange; one tenor banjo played by Michael Pingatore, and a complement of violins.

Musicologists largely ignored this original arrangement—with its unique instrumental requirements—until its revival in reconstructions beginning in the mid-1980s, owing to the popularity and serviceability of the later scorings. After the 1924 premiere, Grofé revised the score and made new orchestrations in 1926 and 1942, each time for larger orchestras. He published his arrangement for a theater orchestra in 1926. Grofé orchestrated this adaptation for a more standard "pit orchestra", which included one flute, one oboe, two clarinets, one bassoon, three saxophones, two French horns, two trumpets, and two trombones, as well as the same percussion and strings complement as the later 1942 version.

Paul Whiteman again performed Rhapsody in Blue in the film King of Jazz (1930), arranged by Grofé.

Grofé later produced a 1942 arrangement for a full symphony orchestra. It is scored for solo piano and an orchestra consisting of two flutes, two oboes, two clarinets in B♭ and A, one bass clarinet, two bassoons, two alto saxophones in E♭, one tenor saxophone in B♭; three French horns in F, three trumpets in B♭, three trombones, one tuba; a percussion section that includes timpani, one suspended cymbal, one snare drum, one bass drum, one tam-tam, one triangle, one glockenspiel, and cymbals; one tenor banjo; and strings. Since the mid-20th century, the 1942 arrangement became a staple of the concert repertoire until 1976 when Michael Tilson Thomas recorded the original jazz band version for the first time, employing Gershwin's actual 1925 piano roll with a full jazz orchestra.

Grofé's other arrangements of Gershwin's piece include those done for Whiteman's 1930 film, King of Jazz, and the concert band setting (playable without piano) completed by 1938 and published 1942. The prominence of the saxophones in the later orchestrations is somewhat reduced, and the banjo part can be dispensed with, as its mainly rhythmic contribution is provided by the inner strings.

Gershwin himself made versions of the piece for solo piano, as well as two pianos. The solo version is notable for omitting several sections of the piece. (Note: Omissions include the bars from rehearsal mark 14 to halfway through the fifth bar of rh. 18; from two bars before rh. 22 to the fourth bar of rh. 24; and the first four bars of rh. 38.) Gershwin's intent to eventually do an orchestration of his own is documented in 1936–37 correspondence from the publisher Harms.

== Notable recordings ==
1927 electrical recording of Rhapsody in Blue as Victor 35822 by Paul Whiteman and His Concert Orchestra with George Gershwin on piano, 1974 Grammy Hall of Fame inductee

After the warm reception of Rhapsody in Blue by the audience at Aeolian Hall, Gershwin recorded several abridged versions of his composition in different formats. On June 10, 1924, Gershwin and Whiteman's orchestra created an acoustic recording running 8 minutes and 59 seconds and issued by the Victor Talking Machine Company. (Note: Victor 55225 is the June 10, 1924, acoustic recording with the original clarinetist, Ross Gorman, performing the opening glissando.) A year later, Gershwin recorded his performance on a 1925 piano roll for a two-piano version. Later, on April 21, 1927, he made an electrical recording with Whiteman's orchestra running 9 minutes and 1 second and again recorded by Victor. (Note: Victor 35822 is the April 21, 1927, electrical recording in which Nathaniel Shilkret conducted the orchestra and later dubbed onto an RCA Victor 33 1/3-rpm.) Nathaniel Shilkret purportedly conducted the electrical recording after a dispute between Gershwin and Whiteman. Whiteman's orchestra later performed a truncated version of the piece in the 1930 film King of Jazz with Roy Bargy on piano.

Due to the length limitations of early recording formats, the first complete and unabridged recording of Gershwin's composition did not occur until the Great Depression. In July 1935, after several years of performing the rhapsody for sold-out audiences in Massachusetts, conductor Arthur Fiedler and the Boston Pops recorded the first unabridged version—nearly 14 minutes in length—with Puerto Rican pianist Jesús María Sanromá for RCA Victor. (Note: Fiedler and the Boston Pops made another popular recording of the work in stereophonic sound with Earl Wild at the piano for RCA Victor in 1959.) For this first unabridged recording, Fiedler discarded Ferde Grofé's original 1924 arrangement and adapted the piece for a conventional symphony. At the time, contemporary critics praised Fiedler for jettisoning the so-called "jazzy sentimentality" of Grofé's earlier arrangement and adding a "more symphonic richness and authority."

During the final months of World War II, amid the box-office success of the Gershwin biographical film Rhapsody in Blue (1945), pianist Oscar Levant recorded the now-iconic composition with Eugene Ormandy's Philadelphia Orchestra on August 21, 1945. Levant had been an intimate friend of the deceased composer, and he sought to replicate Gershwin's idiomatic playing style in his performance. Levant's homage—labelled Columbia Masterworks 251—received rapturous reviews and became one of the best-selling record albums of the year. As a result of Levant's recording and the 1945 biographical film about Gershwin's life, a "Gershwin revival" ensued.

Rhapsody in Blue for piano four hands (8:09)
The Latsos Piano Duo perform Rhapsody in Blue for piano four hands, arr. Henry Levine in the concert series for Music in the Mansion, filmed by Beverly Hills Television, Los Angeles, in Greystone Mansion (2023)

By the 1960s and 1970s, Gershwin's rhapsody had become a predictable staple of both concert performances and orchestra recordings; consequently, more diverse and irreverent interpretations appeared over time. In Summer 1973, Brazilian jazz-rock artist Eumir Deodato reinterpreted Gershwin's rhapsody in an abridged version that featured uptempo neo‐samba rhythms. Although music critics derided Deodato's interpretation as "mangled" and barely recognizable, his single reached No. 41 on the "Hot 100" and No. 10 on "Easy Listening" on the Billboard charts, and No. 48 and No. 13 respectively in Canada. In the wake of Deodato's earlier reinterpretation, French pianist Richard Clayderman recorded a similarly abridged disco arrangement in 1978 which became one of his signature pieces.

Concurrent with the emergence of these more diverse interpretations, scholarly interest revived in the original 1924 arrangement by Ferde Grofé, which had not been performed since the end of the Jazz Age. On February 14, 1973, conductor Kenneth Kiesler and pianist Paul Verrette performed Grofé's original arrangement on the University of New Hampshire campus. Soon after, conductor Michael Tilson Thomas and the Columbia Jazz Band recorded Grofé's arrangement in 1976, as did conductor Maurice Peress with pianist Ivan Davis in 1984, as part of a 60th-anniversary reconstruction of the entire 1924 concert.

More than one hundred years after the debut of Gershwin's rhapsody in 1924, tens of thousands of orchestras, as well as solo pianists, have recorded the piece, both abridged and unabridged. A number of these recordings have garnered critical recognition, such as pianist Michel Camilo's 2006 rendition, which won a Latin Grammy Award.

== Form and analysis ==
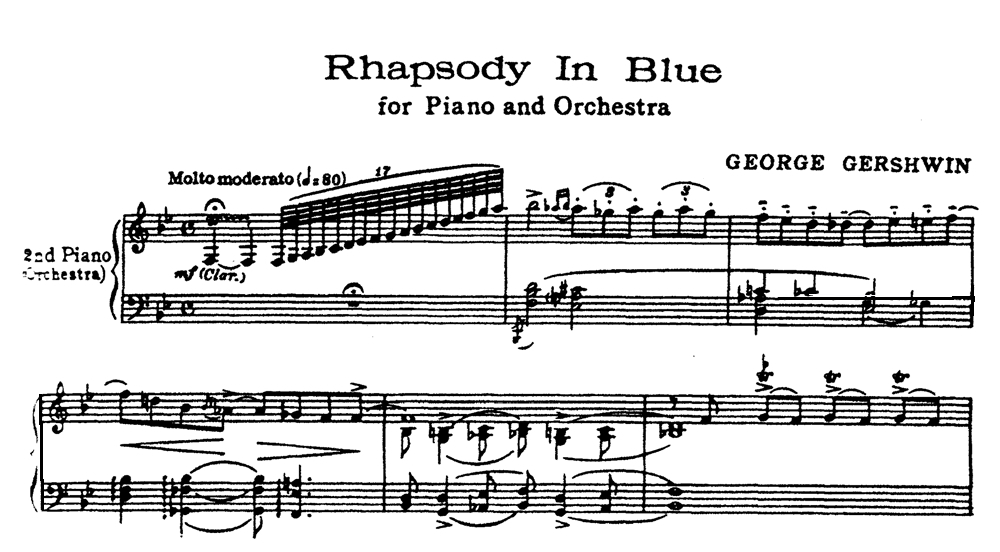
The opening bars of Gershwin's score for the rhapsody, often referred to as the "Glissando theme"

As a jazz concerto, Rhapsody in Blue is written for solo piano with orchestra. A rhapsody differs from a concerto in that it features one extended movement instead of separate movements. Rhapsodies often incorporate passages of an improvisational nature—although written out in a score—and are irregular in form, with heightened contrasts and emotional exuberance. The music ranges from intensely rhythmic piano solos to slow, broad, and richly orchestrated sections. Consequently, the Rhapsody "may be looked upon as a fantasia, with no strict fidelity to form."

The opening of Rhapsody in Blue is written as a clarinet trill followed by a legato, 17 notes in a diatonic scale. During a rehearsal, Whiteman's virtuoso clarinetist, Ross Gorman, rendered the upper portion of the scale as a captivating and trombone-like glissando. Gershwin heard it and insisted that it be repeated in the performance. The effect is produced using the tongue and throat muscles to change the resonance of the oral cavity, thus controlling the continuously rising pitch. Many clarinet players gradually open the left-hand tone holes on their instrument during the passage from the last concert F to the top concert B♭, as well. This effect has now become standard performance practice for the work.

Rhapsody in Blue features both rhythmic invention and melodic inspiration and demonstrates Gershwin's ability to write a piece with large-scale harmonic and melodic structure. The piece is characterized by strong motivic inter-relatedness. Much of the motivic material is introduced in the first 14 measures. Musicologist David Schiff has identified five major themes plus a sixth "tag". Two themes appear in the first 14 measures, and the tag shows up in measure 19. Two of the remaining three themes are rhythmically related to the first theme in measure 2, which is sometimes called the "Glissando theme"—after the opening glissando in the clarinet solo—or the "Ritornello theme". The remaining theme is the "Train theme", which is the first to appear at rehearsal 9 after the opening material. All of these themes rely on the blues scale, which includes lowered sevenths and a mixture of major and minor thirds. Each theme appears both in orchestrated form and as a piano solo. Considerable differences exist in the style of presentation of each theme.

"Rhapsody in Blue" (Cover)
2018 piano solo cover of Rhapsody in Blue

The harmonic structure of the rhapsody is more difficult to analyze. The piece begins and ends in B♭ major, but it modulates towards the subdominant direction and abruptly returns to B♭ major at the end. The opening modulates "downward" through the keys B♭, E♭, A♭, D♭, G♭, B, E, and finally to A major. Modulation through the circle of fifths in the reverse direction inverts classical tonal relationships, but does not abandon them. The entire middle section resides primarily in C major, with forays into G major (the dominant relation). Such modulations occur freely, although not always with harmonic direction. Gershwin frequently uses a recursive harmonic progression of minor thirds to give the illusion of motion when in fact a passage does not change key from beginning to end. Modulation by thirds is a common feature of Tin Pan Alley music.

The influences of jazz and other contemporary styles are present in Rhapsody in Blue. Ragtime rhythms are abundant, as is the Cuban "clave" rhythm, which doubles as a dance rhythm in the Charleston jazz dance. Gershwin's own intentions were to correct the belief that jazz had to be played strictly in time so that one could dance to it. The rhapsody's tempos vary widely, and an almost extreme use of rubato occurs in many places throughout. The clearest influence of jazz is the use of blue notes, and the exploration of their half-step relationship plays a key role in the rhapsody. The use of so-called "vernacular" instruments, such as accordion, banjo, and saxophones, in the orchestra contribute to its jazz or popular style, and the latter two of these instruments have remained part of Grofé's "standard" orchestra scoring.

Gershwin incorporated different piano styles into his work. He used the techniques of stride piano, novelty piano, comic piano, and the song-plugger piano style. Stride piano's rhythmic and improvisational style is evident in the "agitato e misterioso" section, which begins four bars after rehearsal 33, as well as in other sections, many of which include the orchestra. Novelty piano can be heard at rehearsal 9 with the revelation of the Train theme. The hesitations and light-hearted style of comic piano, a vaudeville approach to piano made well known by Chico Marx, are evident at rehearsal 22.

== Legacy and influence ==
=== Cultural zeitgeist ===
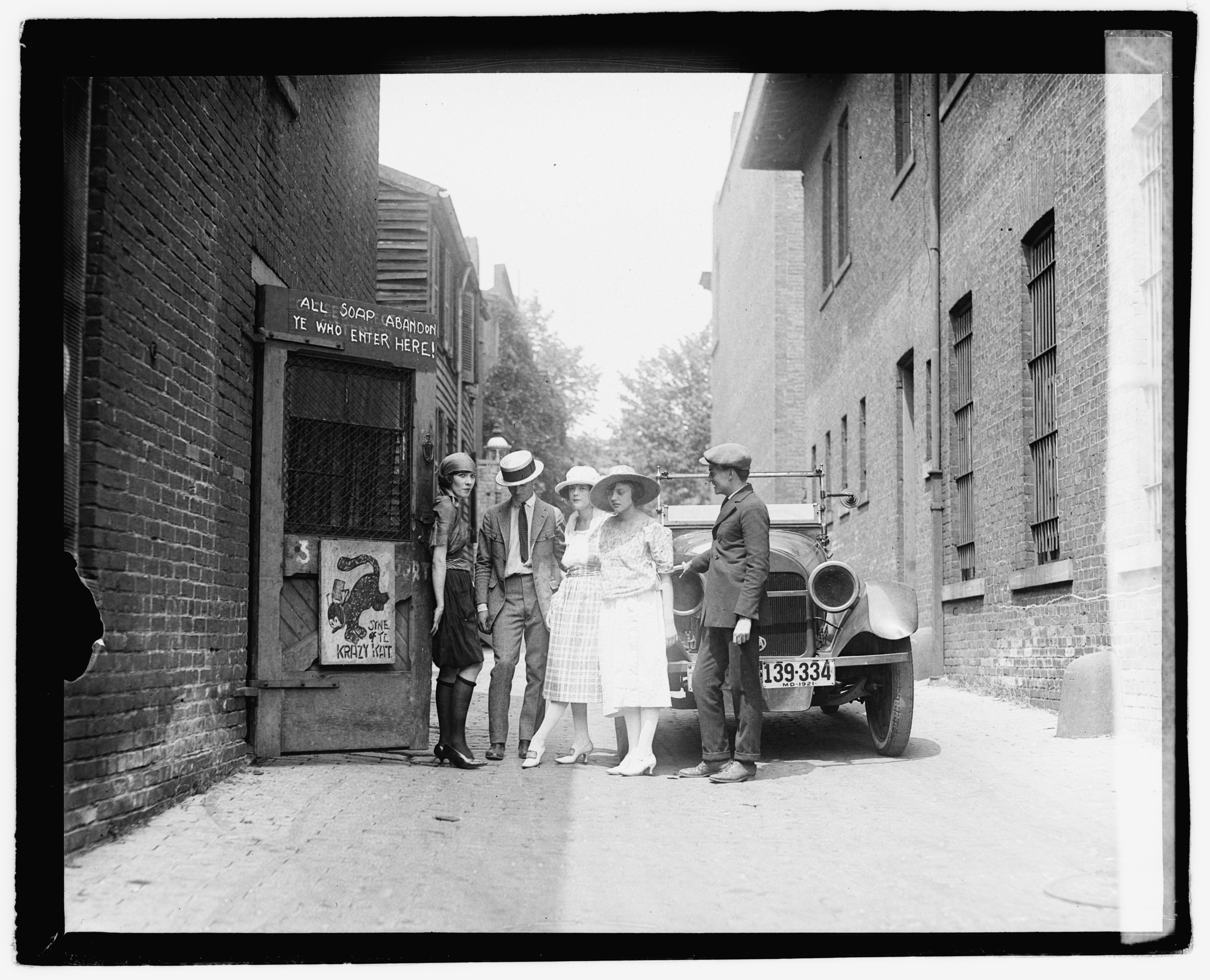
Gershwin's work has been cited by writers and scholars as embodying the Jazz Age's zeitgeist with its flappers and speakeasies. Above: Patrons and a flapper (among them Inez Hogan and Cleon Throckmorton) await the opening of a speakeasy in 1921.

With the debut of Rhapsody in Blue, Gershwin inaugurated a new era in America's musical history. He established his reputation as one of the eminent composers of the Jazz Age, and his composition eventually became one of the most popular of all concert works. In the American Heritage magazine, Frederic D. Schwarz posits that the famous opening clarinet glissando has become as instantly recognizable to concert audiences as the opening of Beethoven's Fifth Symphony.

According to critic Orrin Howard of the Los Angeles Philharmonic, Gershwin's rhapsody made an indelible mark "on the fraternity of serious composers and performers—many of whom were present at the premiere—and on Gershwin himself, for its enthusiastic reception encouraged him to other and more serious projects." Howard posits that the work's legacy is best understood as embodying the cultural zeitgeist of the Jazz Age:

Beginning with that incomparable, flamboyant clarinet solo, Rhapsody is irresistible still, with its syncopated rhythmic vibrancy, its abandoned, impudent flair that tells more about the Roaring Twenties than could a thousand words, and its genuine melodic beauty colored a deep, jazzy blue by the flatted sevenths and thirds that had their origins in the African-American slave songs.

Although Gershwin's rhapsody is "by no means a definitive example of jazz in the Jazz Age", music historians such as James Ciment and Floyd Levin have similarly concurred that it is the key composition that encapsulates the spirit of the era. As early as 1927, writer F. Scott Fitzgerald opined that Rhapsody in Blue idealized the youthful zeitgeist of the Jazz Age. In subsequent decades, both the latter era and Fitzgerald's related literary works have been often culturally linked by critics and scholars with Gershwin's composition. In 1941, social historian Peter Quennell opined that Fitzgerald's novel The Great Gatsby embodied "the sadness and the remote jauntiness of a Gershwin tune." Accordingly, director Baz Luhrmann used Rhapsody in Blue as a dramatic leitmotif for the character of Jay Gatsby in his 2013 film The Great Gatsby, a cinematic adaptation of Fitzgerald's 1925 novel.

Various writers, such as the American playwright and journalist Terry Teachout, have likened Gershwin himself to the character of Gatsby due to his attempt to transcend his lower-class background, his abrupt meteoric success, and his early death while in his thirties.

In June 2026, CBS News included Rhapsody in Blue in its list of the 250 essential American songs of the past 250 years.

=== Musical portrait of New York City ===
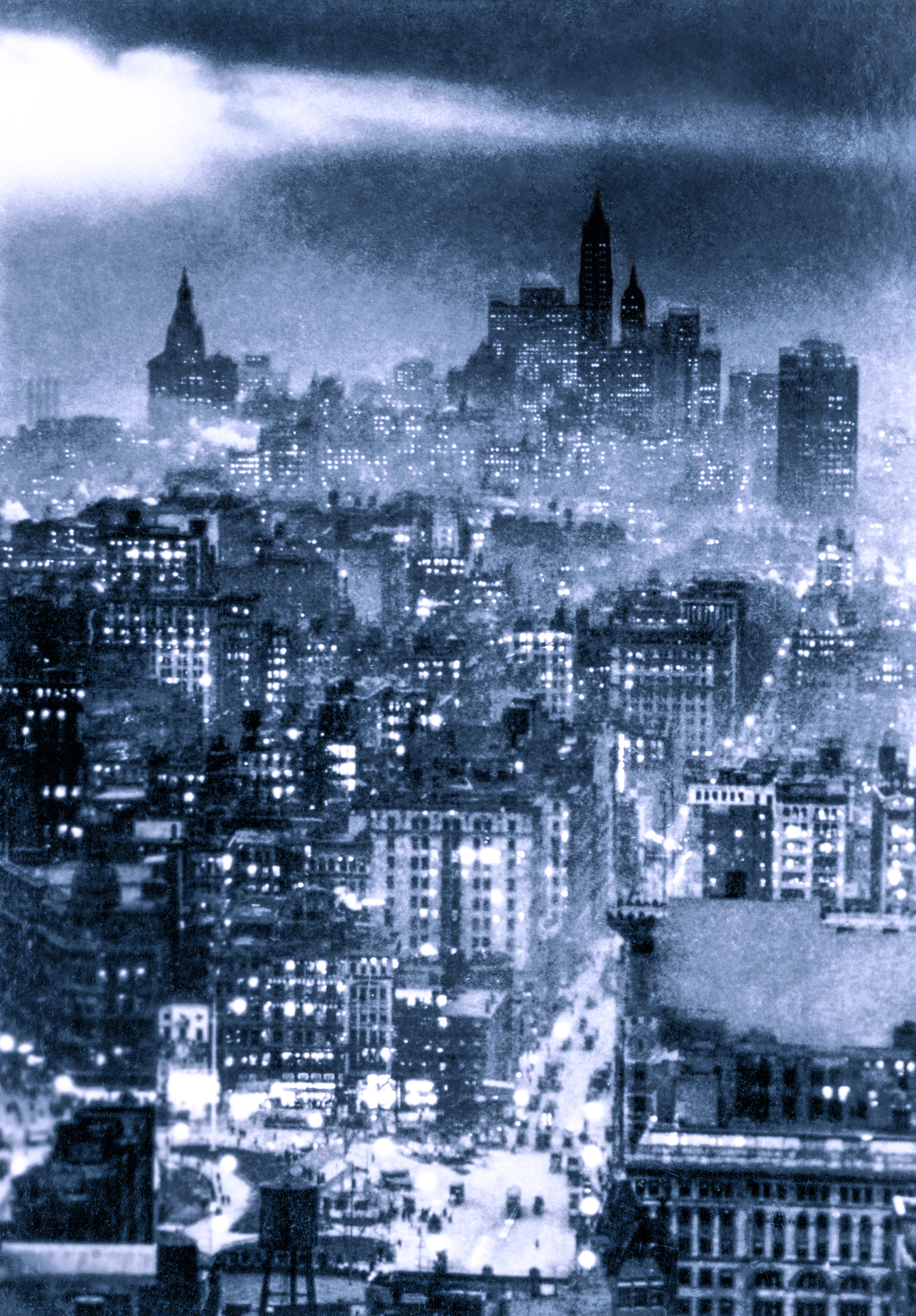
Rhapsody in Blue has been interpreted as a musical portrait of Jazz Age New York City.

Rhapsody in Blue has been interpreted as a musical portrait of early-20th-century New York City. Culture scribe Darryn King wrote in The Wall Street Journal that "Gershwin's fusion of jazz and classical traditions captures the thriving melting pot of Jazz Age New York."

Likewise, music historian Vince Giordano has opined that "the syncopation, the blue notes, the ragtime and jazz rhythms that Gershwin wrote in 1924 was really a feeling of New York City in that amazing era. The rhythm of the city seems to be in there." Pianist Lang Lang echoes this sentiment: "When I hear Rhapsody in Blue, I see the Empire State Building somehow. I see the New York Skyline in midtown Manhattan, and I already see the coffee shops [in] Times Square."

Accordingly, the opening montage of Woody Allen's 1979 film Manhattan features a rendition by Zubin Mehta in which quintessential New York scenes are set to the music of Gershwin's famed jazz concerto. Twenty years later, Walt Disney Pictures used the composition for the New York segment of the 1999 animated film Fantasia 2000, in which the piece lyrically frames an animated segment drawn in the style of illustrator Al Hirschfeld.

=== Influence on composers ===
Gershwin's rhapsody has influenced a number of composers. In 1955, Rhapsody in Blue inspired accordionist John Serry Sr. to compose his 1957 work American Rhapsody. Brian Wilson, leader of the Beach Boys, stated on several occasions that Rhapsody in Blue is one of his favorite pieces. He first heard the piece as a two-year-old and recalled that he adored it. According to biographer Peter Ames Carlin, the rhapsody influenced Wilson's Smile album. Rhapsody in Blue also inspired a collaboration between blind savant British pianist Derek Paravicini and composer Matthew King on a new concerto, called Blue premiered at the South Bank Centre in London in 2011.

=== Other uses ===
At the opening ceremony of the 1984 Summer Olympics in Los Angeles, 84 pianists played simultaneously Rhapsody in Blue in an ensemble performance. Pianists Herbie Hancock and Lang Lang performed Rhapsody in Blue at the 50th Grammy Awards on February 10, 2008. Since 1987, the piece has been used by United Airlines in their advertisements, in pre-flight safety videos, and in the Terminal 1 underground walkway at Chicago O'Hare International Airport. Rhapsody in Blue was sampled in Ben Folds Five's "Philosophy" and South Korean girl groups Red Velvet's "Birthday" and Loossemble's "Real World".

== Preservation status ==
On September 22, 2013, the Gershwin estate announced that a musicological critical edition of the full orchestral score will be eventually released. The Gershwin family, working in conjunction with the Library of Congress and the University of Michigan, are working to make these scores available to the public. Though the entire Gershwin project may take 40 years to complete, the Rhapsody in Blue edition will be an early volume.

Selections from Rhapsody in Blue
1924 recording featuring George Gershwin on piano with the Paul Whiteman Orchestra

Rhapsody in Blue entered the public domain on January 1, 2020, although individual recordings of it may remain under copyright. The first published recordings from 1924 entered the public domain in 2025.
