= HGO Trust =

UK musical group

- HGO Trust
- HGO Logo
- Established: 1990
- Founder: Roy Budden
- Founded at: London, United Kingdom
- Registration no.: 1168484
- Legal status: charity
- Purpose: music education
- Website: http://www.hgo.org.uk
- Formerly called: Hampstead Garden Opera

HGO Trust (HGO) (formerly Hampstead Garden Opera) was founded in 1990 by Roy Budden as an evening class at the Hampstead Garden Institute, London. Its objectives are to advance public education in the art and science of music with emphasis on operatic music.

== Objectives ==
HGO brings live opera, fully staged with orchestra, and offers performance opportunity and training to young singers. It performs two fully staged operas each year, usually in original language. Upstairs at The Gatehouse, Highgate Village, in the London Borough of Camden, was HGO's home from March 2001 until May 2016 when it relocated to the Jacksons Lane Theatre in Highgate. HGO is affiliated to the National Operatic and Dramatic Association.

== Productions ==
The original intention was to concentrate on the major operas of Mozart, but the repertoire has expanded to encompass works by others as well.

The HGO production of Mozart's Così fan tutte received the 2012 Offie for Best Opera Production.

HGO's productions for 2018 were Verdi's La traviata and Domenico Cimarosa's Il matrimonio segreto. In May 2019 it produced George Frideric Handel's Partenope, nominated for the 2020 Offie. Its 2019 production of La bohème won a NODA London Opera Award in 2020.

In August 2020 HGO was the first company to stage a live opera performance in North London after the COVID-19 epidemic when it produced Gustav Holst's opera Sāvitri at Lauderdale House.

== Board ==
The Directors of the Company and Trustees of the Charity, as of April 2020, are:

- David Conway – Chairman
- Alastair Macgeorge – Chairman Emeritus
- Roger Sainsbury
- Martin Musgrave – Deputy Chairman
- Patricia Cabredo Hofherr

HGO's Co-Presidents are Dame Emma Kirkby and Howard Williams.

== Productions 2009 – date ==
- April 2009 - Carlisle Floyd: Susannah.
- November 2009 - Henry Purcell: Dido and Æneas, and John Blow: Venus and Adonis.
- April 2010 - Mozart: The Clemency of Titus.
- November 2010 - Mozart: The Magic Flute. This was the first time an English opera company used the Stephen Fry translation of the libretto, as seen in Kenneth Branagh's 2006 film version.
- April 2011 - George Frederic Handel: Semele.
- November 2011 - Ralph Vaughan Williams: Hugh the Drover.
- April 2012 - Mozart: Così fan tutte.
- November 2012 - Claudio Monteverdi: Orfeo.
- April 2013 - Jonathan Dove: Mansfield Park.
- November 2013 - Mozart: The Marriage of Figaro.
- April 2014 - Francesco Cavalli: La Calisto.
- November 2014 - Benjamin Britten: Albert Herring.
- April 2015 - Handel: Xerxes
- November 2015 - Mozart: Don Giovanni
- May 2016 - Pietro Mascagni: Cavalleria Rusticana and Ruggiero Leoncavallo:I Pagliacci.
- November 2016 - Mozart: The Magic Flute.
- May 2017 - Monteverdi: L'Incoronazione di Poppea.
- November 2017 - Jonathan Dove: The Enchanted Pig.
- May 2018 - Giuseppe Verdi: La traviata.
- November 2018 - Domenico Cimarosa: The Secret Marriage.
- May 2019 - Handel: Partenope.
- November 2019 - Giacomo Puccini: La bohème
- November 2021 - Mozart: Le nozze di Figaro

== Recent productions ==
In August 2020, the company staged Gustav Holst's opera Sāvitri at Lauderdale House.

The company produced a new edition of Francesco Cavalli's 1643 opera L'Egisto at The Cockpit Theatre, London, in June 2021.

In March 2022, the company gave the British premiere of the 1774 Hebrew-language oratorio Ester by the Austrian composer Cristiano Lidarti with libretto by Jacob Raphael Saraval. The performance at the Free Church, Hampstead Garden Suburb raised £1,200 for the Red Cross Ukraine Emergency Appeal.
