= Mansfield Park (opera) =

Opera by Jonathan Dove

- Opera by Jonathan Dove
- Librettist: Alasdair Middleton
- Language: English
- Based on: Mansfield Park by Jane Austen
- Premiere: 30 July 2011; Boughton House, Northamptonshire

Mansfield Park is a 2011 chamber opera in two acts by Jonathan Dove with a libretto by Alasdair Middleton based on the 1814 novel by Jane Austen. Initially composed for four handed piano, it has been set to music for 13-piece orchestral ensemble. It tells the story of poor relation Fanny Price, sent at age 10 to live with her uncle, Sir Thomas Bertram, at his family estate, Mansfield Park.

== Performance history ==
The opera was commissioned by the touring opera company Heritage Opera in 2008. The vocal score was finished in December 2010, the world premiere performance, directed by Michael McCaffery, followed on July 30, 2011 at Boughton House in Northamptonshire. The opera premiered in its initial version scored for four handed piano. It was accompanied by Paul Greenhalgh and Jonathan Ellis, under the musical direction of Chris Gill. The world premiere tour comprised mainly heritage venues in the northwest of England, and one performance at the Arcola Theatre in Dalston, East London, as part of the Grimeborn Festival. Royal Academy Opera gave two performances of the opera in May 2012, and Hampstead Garden Opera gave ten performances in a new production directed by Bruno Ravella in April 2013.

In 2015 the opera received its American premiere in Baltimore, Maryland. It was performed by the Peabody Chamber Opera of the Peabody Institute at the Baltimore Theatre Project. Eileen Cornett served as music director, with Mark Streshinsky as artistic director. Johanna Kvam and Hanna Shin performed the score for four hands piano.

The opera was given its Australian premiere in April 2016 at the Independent Theatre in Sydney in a production by opera company Operantics. The director was Joseph Restubog, the pianists were Nathaniel Kong and Geena Cheung, and it was conducted by Keiren Brandt-Sawdy.

The operas composition for 13-piece orchestra was commissioned by The Grange Festival, and premiered on September 16, 2017.

The Southern California premiere was made in June 2018 by Opera UCLA, directed by Peter Kazaras.

In 2019 the opera was performed with piano by Opera South in February, with orchestra at the Royal Birmingham Conservatoire in June 2019, and with piano by Waterperry Opera Festival in July, by Vanderbilt University in October, and by Paul Butler School of Music in December.

The orchestral version had its American premiere by Opera Modesto on January 11, 2020, and saw its Canadian premiere by University of Toronto Opera on March 12, 2020. The first Canadian production was cancelled after two performances due to Coronavirus disease 2019. The next Canadian production by the University of British Columbia in February 2021 presented the version for two pianos. Due to the still ongoing pandemic, the singers wore masks and the opera was shown as video stream from the Chan Shun Concert Hall without a live audience.

== Roles ==
Role	Voice type	Premiere cast, 30 July 2011 (Conductor: Chris Gill)	Orchestral version Premiere cast, September 16, 2017 (Conductor: David Parry)
Fanny Price	mezzo-soprano	Serenna Wagner	Martha Jones
Lady Bertram	contralto	Nuala Willis	Sarah Pring
Sir Thomas Bertram	baritone	John Rawnsley	Grant Doyle
Maria Bertram	soprano	Eloise Rutledge	Emily Vine
Julia Bertram	mezzo-soprano	Paloma Bruce	Angharad Lyddon
Edmund Bertram	baritone	Thomas Eaglen	Henry Neill
Aunt Norris	soprano	Birgit Rohowska	Jeni Bern
Mary Crawford	coloratura soprano	Sarah Helsby Hughes	Shelley Jackson
Henry Crawford	tenor	Nicholas Sales	Nick Pritchard
Mr. Rushworth	tenor	Darren Clarke	Oliver Johnston

== Instrumentation ==
The initial version from 2011 was written for two players on one piano. The orchestral version from 2017 is written for 13 instrumentalists playing: flute (doubling piccolo), oboe (doubling cor Anglais), clarinet in B♭, bassoon, 2 horns in F, percussion, piano, 2 violins, viola, violoncello and double bass.

== Synopsis ==
The chapters and their titles are sung by the ensemble.

=== Act 1 ===
Scene 1: Mansfield Park, Chapter One. The Bertrams Observed.

In which we meet the inhabitants of Mansfield Park.

Scene 2: Chapter Two. First Impressions.

In which we discover that Miss Mary Crawford has twenty thousand pounds and that Mr Henry Crawford is not handsome.

Scene 3: Chapter Three. Sir Thomas Bertram's Farewell

In which Sir Thomas Bertram leaves for Antigua.

Scene 4: Chapter Four. Landscape Gardening

In which Mr Rushworth proposes a trip to Sotherton, his estate.

Scene 5: Chapter Five. In the Wilderness

In which the estate is explored.

Scene 6: Chapter Six. Music and Astronomy

In which songs are sung and stars observed.

Scene 7: Chapter Seven. Lovers' Vows

In which Amateur Theatricals are undertaken.

Scene 8: Chapter Eight. Persuasion

In which Edmund's resolution is tested.

Scene 9: Chapter Nine. The Rehearsal Interrupted

In which Sir Thomas returns.

Scene 10: Chapter Ten. Independence and Splendour, Or Twelve Thousand a Year

In which happiness is defined.

Scene 11: Chapter Eleven. A View of a Wedding, seen from the Shrubbery at Mansfield Park

In which a wedding is celebrated, a honeymoon begun, a revelation made and plot hatched.

=== Act 2 ===
Scene 1: Volume Two, Chapter One. Preparations for a Ball

In which Miss Fanny Price accepts a present from Miss Mary Crawford.

Scene 2: Chapter Two. A Ball

In which partners are chosen.

Scene 3: Chapter Three. A Proposal

In which the Bertram family are variously surprised, delighted, disappointed, confused and outraged.

Scene 4: Chapter Four. Some Correspondence

In which much ink is spilt.

Scene 5: Chapter Five. Follies and Grottoes

In which the Rushworths meet an old acquaintance.

Scene 6: Chapter Six. A Newspaper Paragraph

In which occurs a matrimonial fracas.

Scene 7: Chapter The Last

In which Mr Edmund Bertram declares his feelings to his future bride.
