= The Enchanted Pig (opera) =

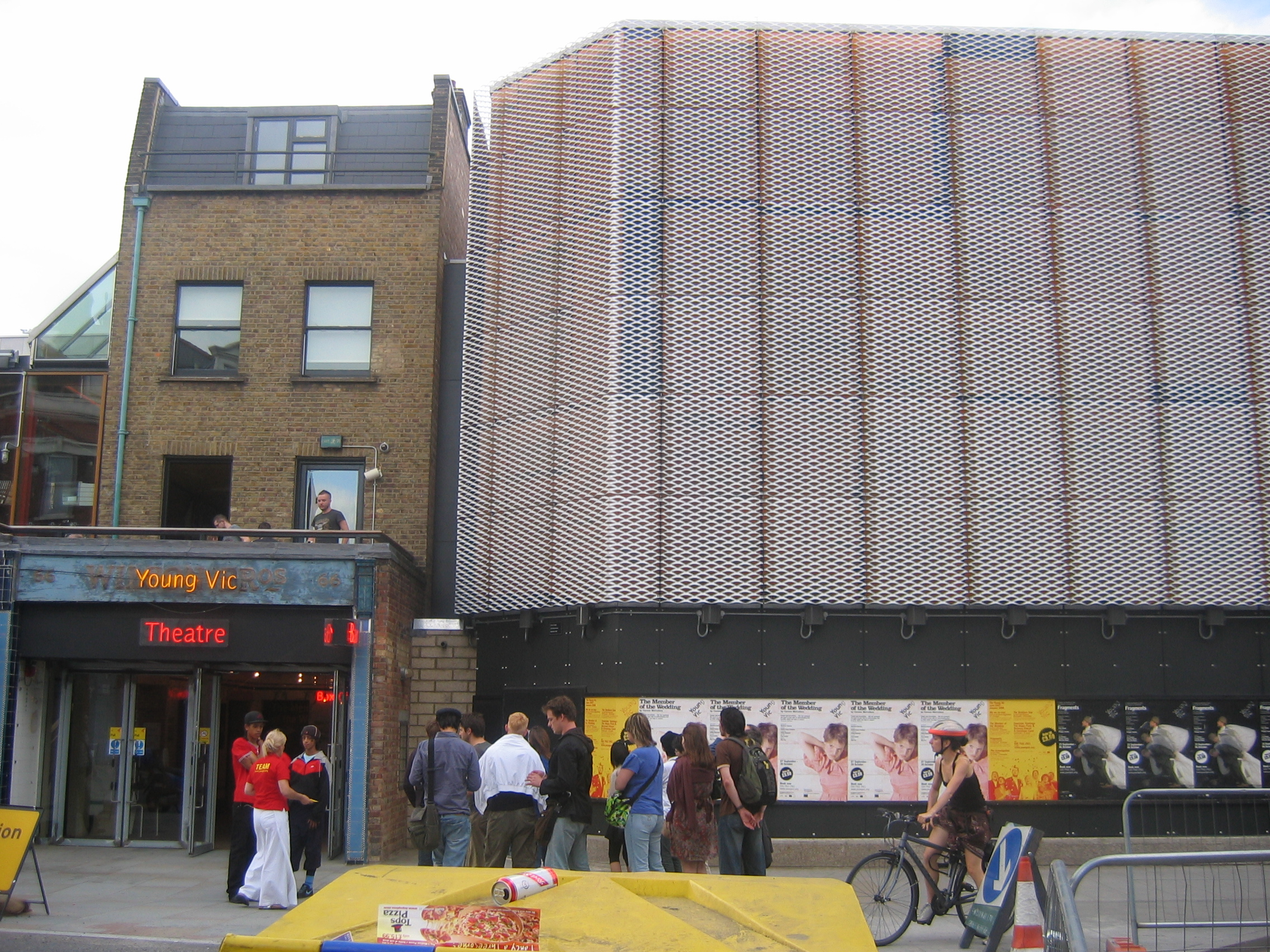
Young Vic theatre, London

The Enchanted Pig is a chamber opera with music by Jonathan Dove to a libretto by Alasdair Middleton. It is based on themes from traditional fairy tales: "The Enchanted Pig", and "The Brown Bear of Norway".

The opera was commissioned by the Young Vic theatre, by which it was premiered in 2006. Subsequent productions have included one by Hampstead Garden Opera in November 2017. It is scored for eight voices, who between them cover roles as chorus and 15 character parts. The accompanying instrumental ensemble consists of accordion, harp, trombone, cello, double bass, piano and percussion (including anvil and spoons). Many of the characters are assigned leitmotifs in the music – that for the pig is a muted-trombone motif in the key of B-flat minor.

== Roles ==
| Role | Voice type | Premiere cast, 1 December 2006 | |
|---|---|---|---|
| Mab / Adelaide / Chorus 1 | soprano | | |
| Dot / Day / Chorus 2 | soprano | | |
| Flora / Chorus 3 | mezzo-soprano | Caryl Hughes | |
| Book of Fate / Old Woman / Mrs. North Wind / Chorus 4 | contralto | Nuala Willis | |
| King of the East / Moon / Chorus 5 | tenor | Josh Dallas | |
| King of the West / Sun / Chorus 6 | tenor | | |
| King Hildebrand/ North Wind / Chorus 7 | baritone | John Rawnsley | |
| Pig / Chorus 8 (role share) | bass-baritone | Rodney Clarke | Byron Watson |

== Synopsis ==
The three daughters of King Hildebrand, while their father is away at war, enter against his rules a room in the castle containing a book which predicts their fortunes; two are to be married to princes, but Flora is to be married to a pig. Things must take place as the book decrees; but it transpires that the pig marrying Flora is in fact a king under a spell and can return to human form by night – if Flora will have faith in him, the spell can be broken. Flora is deceived by an old woman – in fact the witch who has enchanted the pig – into acting to break the spell more quickly, but this is a ruse which enables the witch to get hold of the pig and carry him off to marry her own daughter, Adelaide. With the help of the North Wind, the Moon and the Sun, Flora tracks down the pig to beyond the Milky Way, where he is kept in a drugged stupor by the witch and Adelaide. Offering herself to Adelaide as a spy to keep watch on the pig, Flora is enabled to release him and to live with him in human form happily ever after.

== Reception ==
In a review of the original production, the critic Michael Billington wrote in The Guardian: "This is a show that proves opera, at its best, is source of magic and enchantment." In The Independent, Paul Taylor called it an " exhilarating opera for children (and discerning adults)." Reviewing a 2009 production at the Linbury Studio Theatre, Rupert Christiansen wrote for The Daily Telegraph: "Dove is a highly skilful pasticheur, and Britten, Sondheim, and Bartok are among the more respectable sources of his inspiration here. What Dove must take full credit for is the creation of vocal lines which allow the text to communicate." A new production was undertaken by Hampstead Garden Opera in November 2017 which was rated "hugely enjoyable" by The Stage.
