= London Fields (disambiguation) =

London Fields is an area of Hackney, East London, United Kingdom. It may also refer to:

- London Fields Brewery, brewery in the London Fields area
- London Fields railway station, railway station in London Fields
- London Fields (ward), electoral ward in Hackney
- London Fields, Dudley, an area of Dudley, West Midlands
- London Fields (novel), 1989 novel by Martin Amis
  - London Fields (film), 2018 film based on the novel
- On London Fields, opera in two acts by Matthew King with a libretto by Alasdair Middleton, notable for its use of multiple ensembles and choruses

== See also ==
- London moment or London field, quantum-mechanical phenomenon whereby a spinning superconductor generates a magnetic field whose axis lines up exactly with the spin axis
