= Howard Williams (conductor) =

British conductor (born 1947)

- Born: 25 April 1947 (age 79)
- Education: The King's School, Canterbury; Guildhall School of Music and Drama
- Occupation: Conductor of classical music
- Known for: Conductor of Sinfonia of Cambridge
- Spouses: Ruth Bridge (1972–1974); Juliet Solomon (1977–2004); Emma Kirkby (2015–present)

Howard Williams (born 25 April 1947) is a British conductor, whose international career has ranged from opera and ballet to orchestral and choral work. He conducts throughout Europe, and has especial links with Hungary since his appointment in 1989 as Artistic Director and Principal Conductor of the Pannon Philharmonic (formerly Pécs Symphony) Orchestra.

== Education and career ==
Howard Williams was educated at New College School, where he was a chorister from 1955 to 1960, then at The King's School, Canterbury, New College, Oxford, the Guildhall School of Music and Drama (London) and Liverpool University. While still at school he studied the piano with Ronald Smith and the violin with Clarence Myerscough. Studying Music at Oxford, he began to conduct student orchestras and choirs, including the Schola Cantorum of Oxford. At Guildhall he studied on the Advanced Conducting Course, going on to take a B.Mus. at Liverpool University. While at Liverpool he was Assistant Conductor to Bryden Thomson with the BBC Philharmonic (then BBC Northern Symphony Orchestra) in Manchester, where he also sang as a member of the BBC Northern Singers.

In 1975 he joined English National Opera as a repetiteur, soon working for the company as conductor and chorus master. He has conducted fifteen productions for them, including the world première of Iain Hamilton's Anna Karenina, and their first production of The Consul [Menotti]. Acclaimed for his partnership with singers, he has altogether conducted more than seventy operas.

He was principal conductor of the Ernest Read Symphony Orchestra (1981–1989); Principal Conductor & Artistic Director Pécs Symphony Orchestra (now Pannon Philharmonic), Hungary (1989–93 and again 1996–2000); Guest conductor with the Royal Ballet, Covent Garden, London, 1984–1986. He conducted the pioneering new productions and television recordings of Punch and Judy, 1986, and The Knot Garden, 1987, with Opera Factory.

Williams has appeared with most major orchestras in the UK and many throughout Europe.

His recordings include music by Louis Andriessen, Frank Bridge, and Edward Cowie, Gerald Finzi, Philip Glass, Mátyás Seiber, Miklós Rózsa, Gerard Schurmann, Donizetti, Mozart, Rossini, Rachmaninov and Mahler. He was editor and composer of the new completion of the 5-act opera Ivan IV, by Georges Bizet, 1991. He is currently Music Director of the Sinfonia of Cambridge and of the Choir of the 21st Century (London). He has continuing relationships with various orchestras throughout Europe, particularly in Hungary.

Williams has been constantly involved with student organisations, and his period as Head of Conducting at the Royal Welsh College of Music and Drama (2000–2006) enabled him to develop his approach to the teaching of conducting. He has been associated with youth orchestras throughout Europe and in the United States, helping to form the National Youth Orchestra of Syria in 2007 while also working with the Syrian National Symphony Orchestra. He is a Professor of Conducting at the Royal College of Music, London.

== Personal life ==
Howard Williams was married to Ruth Bridge (1972–74), then to Juliet Solomon (1977–2004) with whom he has two children. Since 2010 his partner has been the soprano Emma Kirkby, whom he married in 2015.

Williams is a Co-President of the opera company Hampstead Garden Opera.
