= The Adventures of Pinocchio (opera) =

2007 opera by Jonathan Dove

- Opera by Jonathan Dove
- Librettist: Alasdair Middleton
- Language: English
- Based on: The Adventures of Pinocchio by Carlo Collodi
- Premiere: 21 December 2007; Grand Theatre Leeds

The Adventures of Pinocchio is a 2007 opera in two acts by Jonathan Dove with a libretto by Alasdair Middleton based on the 1883 Italian novel of the same name by Carlo Collodi. It tells of the creation of the wooden puppet Pinocchio and some of his adventures on the way to becoming a real boy.

The opera was commissioned by Opera North with Sadler's Wells Theatre, and the original production opened at the Grand Theatre in Leeds on December 21, 2007. It starred Victoria Simmonds as Pinocchio, Mary Plazas as the Blue Fairy and Jonathan Summers as Mister Geppetto. It was directed by Martin Duncan, conducted by David Parry, designed by Francis O'Connor and choreographed by Nick Winston. The production included some ingenious technical stage effects, and used a full symphony orchestra including two accordions (which appear briefly on stage), a piano, and assorted percussion. The opera received its German premiere in Chemnitz in 2008 with Inga Lampert in the title role; the North American premiere was by the Minnesota Opera at the Ordway Center for the Performing Arts on February 28, 2009, with mezzo-soprano Adriana Zabala as Pinocchio; and the Russian premiere was at Teatr Sats, Moscow on November 18, 2011 with Giulia Macariants as Pinocchio.

The work was recorded live at Sadler's Wells Theatre, London, on 29 February & 1 March 2008, and was released on the Opus Arte label on Feb.1, 2009 in both DVD and Blu-ray formats.

== Roles ==
Original cast

- Pinocchio (mezzo-soprano) - Victoria Simmonds
- Geppetto (baritone) - Jonathan Summers
- Cricket / Parrot (coloratura soprano) - Rebecca Bottone
- Cat (tenor) - Mark Wilde
- Fox / Coachman (counter-tenor) - Jamie Laing
- The Blue Fairy (soprano) - Mary Plazas
- Fire-eater / Ape-Judge / Big Green Fisherman / Ringmaster / Farmer (bass) - Graham Broadbent
- Pigeon / Snail (contralto) - Carole Wilson
- Barker (bass) - Paul Gibson
- Arlecchino (tenor), Rosaura (soprano), Pantalone (bass) - Ben Kerslake, Gillene Herbert, Nicholas Butterfield
- Owl Doctor (bass), Crow Doctor (tenor), Beetle Doctor (mezzo-soprano) - Jeremy Peaker, Stephen Briggs, Hazel Croft
- Coal Merchant (bass), Bricklayer (bass) - Edward Thornton, Jeremy Peaker
- Lampwick (tenor) - Allan Clayton
- Drum-maker (bass) - John Cunningham
- Dancers, puppet operators, acrobats, prisoners (non-singing)
- Puppet show audience, puppet policemen, fantasy rich people, lawyers, labourers, pupils, teachers, Funland vendors, circus troupe, Echoes, villagers, townsfolk (chorus)

== List of scenes ==
=== Act One ===
- Scene 1: The wood
  In which Geppetto finds a log.
- Scene 2: Geppetto's hut
  In which Pinocchio is made and Geppetto suffers some of the misfortunes of parenthood; Pinocchio learns about school and the consequences of falling asleep in front of an open fire; a cricket learns the result of giving unwanted advice to small boys; and Geppetto buys Pinocchio a schoolbook.
- Scene 3: A street
  In which Pinocchio sets off to school but is distracted.
- Scene 4: The puppet theatre
  In which Pinocchio meets some old friends; escapes death; is very brave; is rewarded and sent on his way.
- Scene 5: A street
  In which Pinocchio meets a Cat and a Fox and learns about the Field of Miracles.
- Scene 6: The wood
  In which Pinocchio ignores a warning from a ghostly Cricket; is pursued by Assassins; meets a dead girl with blue hair; is hanged and pecked down by some friendly birds.
- Scene 7: The Blue Fairy's cottage
  In which Pinocchio is cured and discovers the consequences of lying to girls with blue hair, promises to be good and sets off to meet Geppetto and live happily ever after.
- Scene 8: The wood
  In which Pinocchio meets the Cat and the Fox again; is tricked out of his money and is mocked by a parrot.
- Scene 9: The court and jail
  In which Pinocchio discovers the meaning of Justice and Freedom.
- Scene 10: The wood
  In which Pinocchio goes looking for the Blue Fairy but finds a grave and goes for a ride on a Pigeon.
- Scene 11: A beach
  In which Pinocchio attempts to help Geppetto.

=== Act Two ===
- Scene 1: Drudgeland
  In which Pinocchio learns about work, meets a lady with blue hair and does quite well at school.
- Scene 2: The seashore
  In which Pinocchio proves indigestible.
- Scene 3: Outside the Blue Fairy's house
  In which Pinocchio knocks at a door, gets frustrated with a Snail and is promised a party.
- Scene 4: A street
  In which Pinocchio, at the urging of his friend Lampwick, sets off for Funland.
- Scene 5: Funland
  In which Pinocchio visits Funland and is transformed by the experience.
- Scene 6: The circus
  In which Pinocchio joins the circus, recognizes a member of the audience and is sold to a Drum-maker.
- Scene 7: The seashore
  In which Pinocchio becomes his old self again and is swallowed by a big fish.
- Scene 8: Inside the big fish
  In which father and son are reunited and escape together.
- Scene 9: The village by the sea
  In which Pinocchio works hard for his father; meets his old acquaintances and finally gets his reward.
