= Rex Lewis-Clack =

American pianist (born 1995)

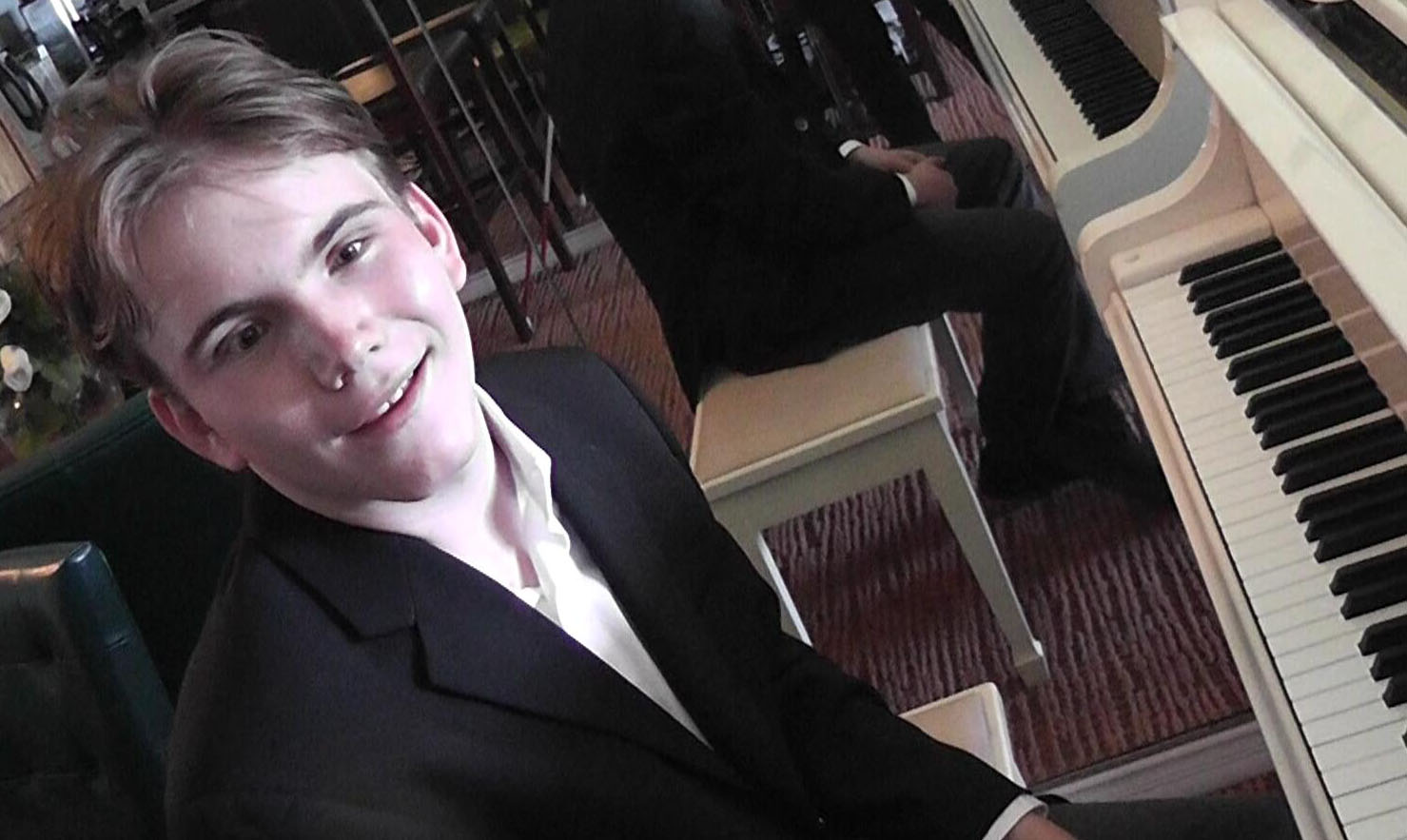
- Born: June 24, 1995 (age 31)

Rex Lewis-Clack (born June 24, 1995) is an American pianist, considered a prodigious musical savant.

== Biography ==
Rex Lewis-Clack was born in Southern California, the son of Cathleen Lewis and Wasaga Clack. He was born with a cerebral arachnoid cyst and with a form of blindness called septo-optic dysplasia. Lewis-Clack began his life education at 6 months of age at The Blind Children's Center in Los Angeles.

Lewis-Clack's fascination with music began at the age of two when he was given a piano keyboard, and as he developed his musical skills, he simultaneously learned to talk and walk. He was completely self-taught at the piano until the age of 5, when he began taking lessons. During one of his first lessons, one of two piano teachers showed him one scale, one time, and he played the other 11 scales back that same day. By the age of 7, Lewis-Clack's piano abilities coupled with both blindness and manifestation of autistic symptoms led to the label "prodigious musical savant". Lewis-Clack has been educated in the public school system since age 5.

In 2012 Rex and Cathleen, along with friends Matt Wolf and Sam McElroy, founded the "Rex & Friends" charity to provide music training and therapy for musicians living with autism or blindness in Los Angeles.

== Media and performance ==
Lewis-Clack came to the attention of CBS's 60 Minutes when he was 7 years old, and filmed for his first profile, called "Musically Speaking", with correspondent Lesley Stahl and Producer Shari Finkelstein, which aired September 28, 2003, when he was 8 years old. 60 Minutes has subsequently aired two other profiles, both named "Rex", the first of which aired in 2005 ("Meet Rex") and the second which aired in 2008 ("Rex—A Musical Savant's Remarkable Strides"). The 2008 profile "Rex", was the winner of the 2009 Edward R. Murrow Award for excellence in news coverage in the category "Best Feature in a Newsmagazine".

Lewis-Clack was also featured alongside British musical savant Derek Paravicini (16 years Rex's senior) in the Focus Productions 2006 documentary The Musical Genius, which aired on Britain's television series Extraordinary People and aired in the United States under the title Musical Savants on the Discovery Health Channel. In 2011 the Science Channel aired a documentary on Lewis-Clack as one part of the eight-part series Ingenious Minds, with the subtitle "The Boy with the Musical Mind". Following Lewis-Clack's 2003 60 Minutes profile "Musically Speaking", he received invitations from groups around the world to play his music. Lewis-Clack travels with his mother to select engagements around the world in a motivational/inspirational format, which allows him to perform in the context of education or fundraising for causes linked to disability. Along with classical repertoire and vocal arrangements, Lewis-Clack plays instantaneous improvisations on given themes or plays a selection in a variety of different styles.

== Awards ==
Lewis-Clack was the recipient of the 2006 Winspiration Award in Baden-Baden, Germany, which honors individuals who inspire others to win.

== Biography ==
Rex—A Mother, Her Autistic Child, and the Music That Transformed Their Lives by Cathleen Lewis was published in 2008 by Thomas Nelson. The biography has also been translated into eight foreign languages (Italian, German, Polish, Japanese, Korean, Simplified Chinese and Traditional Chinese, and Indonesian).
