= Robert Schumann in Three Pieces =

Robert Schumann in Three Pieces is the collective title given to three works, composed for the Avenue A ensemble by the British composer, Matthew King. Together, they constitute a musical portrait of the German Romantic composer, Robert Schumann. The first piece, entitled Ash on the Ground is a passacaglia in which various compositions by Schumann are quoted; the second piece, entitled Love in a Life has a soprano soloist, and is a miniature song cycle to texts by Robert Schumann himself, along with poems by Robert Browning and Elizabeth Barrett Browning. It has been described, by one critic, as "rich and sumptuous, with some spine-tingling moments" the third piece, entitled Night Phantoms and Rocking Horses is a rapid musical survey of Schumann's piano music at a furious galloping tempo. The work ends with fragments of celeste and percussion sounding like a wound-down music box.

Robert Schumann in Three Pieces has been recorded by the Avenue A ensemble on the Weave Records label.
