= Adam Ockelford =

- Education: Royal Academy of Music; University of Birmingham; Goldsmiths, University of London
- Scientific career
- Fields: Music
- Workplaces: University of Roehampton

Adam Ockelford is a Professor of Music and Director of the Applied Music Research Centre at the University of Roehampton, London. He wrote the official biography of Derek Paravicini entitled "In the Key of Genius: The Extraordinary Life of Derek Paravicini".

== Education ==
Adam Ockelford gained a BMus(hons) at the Royal Academy of Music in London, where he gained two LRAMs (in the oboe and harpsichord) and won four prizes. He studied for a Diploma in Special Education (Visual Impairment) at the University of Birmingham in Birmingham, and earned his PhD in Music from the Goldsmiths College in London.

== Research and career ==
Adam Ockelford created the zygonic model of music-structural understanding, which was subsequently used to inform the Sounds of Intent framework of musical development.

After leaving college, Ockelford started his career teaching at the Linden Lodge School for the Blind in London. He then worked at the Royal National Institute of Blind People (RNIB), initially as Music Education Advisor before serving as Director of Education. He now works at the University of Roehampton in London as Director of the Applied Music Research Centre. With his longtime pupil Derek Paravicini, he is a TED Speaker.

Ockelford is the Founder and Trustee of The Amber Trust, a UK-wide charity that supports blind and partially sighted children and young people in their pursuit of music, former Chair of Trustees of Soundabout, a UK-based charity that supports people of all ages with complex needs engage with music, and Founder and Chair of Sounds of Intent Charity. He also serves as Secretary and Trustee of the Society for Education, Music and Psychology research (SEMPRE), an international learned society that holds international conferences, supports research across the world through grants, particularly aimed at young researchers, and publishes three journals, The Psychology of Music, Research Studies in Music Education and Music Science, as well as a series of books on music education and psychology published by Routledge.

In early 2021, Ockelford was made a Freeman of the City of London, by the Worshipful Company of Spectacle Makers.

== Bibliography ==
- Repetition in Music: Theoretical and Metatheoretical Perspectives, London: Routledge. 2005. ISBN 9780754635734.
- In the Key of Genius: The Extraordinary Life of Derek Paravicini, London: Hutchinson. 2007. ISBN 9780091796129
- Music for children and Young People with Complex Needs. 2008. ISBN 9780193223011
- Music, Language, and Autism: Exceptional Strategies for Exceptional Minds. 2013. ISBN 9781849051972
- Comparing Notes: How We Make Sense of Music, London: Profile Books. 2017.

== Selected publications ==
- "The Sounds of Intent project: modeling musical development in children with learning difficulties". Emerald Insight.
- "Musical expectancy in atonal contexts: Musicians’ perception of “antistructure”. Psychology of Music.
- "Sounds of intent, phase 2: gauging the music development of children with complex needs". European Journal of Special Needs Education.
- "Exploring the structural principles underlying the capacity of groups of notes to function concurrently in music". Sage Journals.
- "Similarity relations between groups of notes: Music-theoretical and music-psychological perspectives". Sage Journals.
- "Zygonic Theory: Introduction, Scope, and Prospects". Society for Music theory.
- "A Music Module in Working Memory? Evidence from the Performance of a Prodigious Musical Savant". Sage Journals.
- "Exploring musical interaction between a teacher and pupil, and her evolving musicality, using a music-theoretical approach". Research Studies in Music Education.
- "Implication and expectation in music: a zygonic model". Psychology of Music.
- "Learning and creativity in a prodigious musical savant". International Congress series.
