= Totentango =

2010 song by Matthew King

Totentango is a short orchestral work by the British composer Matthew King, commissioned by the London Symphony Orchestra who premiered the work in the Barbican Hall in London in February 2010. The conductor at the first performance was Pavel Kotla. The composer has said of the work:

Ever since the mysterious "dancing plague" of 1518 there has been a long tradition of pieces of music in which dancing and death find themselves in close proximity and the orchestral repertoire is littered with totentanzes and danse macabres. Totentango is my own modest attempt to engage with that tradition.

Totentango takes about 7 minutes to play. The music fuses together a plethora of dance styles in an intricate polyphony of rhythm. Tango melodies and snatches of Viennese waltz collide with habanera and techno in rapid succession as the music spirals towards obliteration. The virtuoso orchestral style contains a number of elaborate instrumental combinations whilst the lush string writing and use of muted brass is occasionally reminiscent of the film music of the 1940s. The composer Colin Matthews described the work as being "like La Valse orchestrated by Bernard Hermann". Totentango embraces an almost bewildering diversity of styles and is unashamedly melodious which perhaps explains why one dissenting critic has objected to the work's being "listener friendly with a vengeance" whilst conceding that it contained "skillful scoring".
