= Gethsemane (oratorio) =

Chamber-oratorio by Matthew King

Gethsemane is a chamber-oratorio by the British composer Matthew King. Commissioned for the opening concert of the 1998 Spitalfields Festival, the work was composed for the early music group, Florilegium and is scored for 4 vocalists (soprano, alto, tenor, bass) and a 'Baroque' ensemble consisting of flute solo, 2 oboes, 3 natural trumpets, strings, harpsichord and percussion. The oratorio uses a compilation of Biblical texts to relate the New Testament narrative from Jesus' triumphal entry into Jerusalem until his arrest in the Garden of Gethsemane. Each of the four vocalists represents several characters in the story and all four join together to sing collectively as disciples, pharisees and various crowds. Certain instruments within the ensemble are used to represent characters in the drama: for example, Jesus is always accompanied with a flute, the pharisees are joined by rumbling timpani and Judas by a solo harpsichord.

After the first performance, the critic Roderick Dunnett described King's Gethsemane as "passion music in the great tradition" whilst Michael White wrote in The Independent that "there's an innocence about the music which is honest, heartfelt, full of what a German would call "ear-worms": ideas that dig deep into the listener's mind."

== Sources ==
Michael White's review of Gethsemane in The Independent on Sunday, June 7 1998
