= The Snow Queen (King) =

1992 opera by Matthew King

The Snow Queen is a chamber opera in six scenes and a prologue by Matthew King. The libretto, by Andrew McKinnon, is based on the original 1844 allegorical fairy tale by Hans Christian Andersen. The opera was composed in 1992 for the British soprano Jane Manning who sang the title role in the first performance with Pal Rullestad (tenor) and Tracy Chadwell (soprano) in supporting roles. The work also has significant roles for two young singers as Gerda and Kay, the heroic children in the story and a chorus of treble voices. The work is scored for a small ensemble of eight players with conductor: string trio, flute/piccolo/alto flute, clarinet/bass clarinet, piano/celesta and percussion. The pianist also has to play a melodian. At one point, the conductor is required to play a French horn. The wide-ranging musical narrative involves a plethora of musical styles. A review of the first performance described King as being "like a bright Hollywood composer with a sense of humour" and, after a subsequent performance at the Queen Elizabeth Hall in London, another reviewer suggested that the opera contained '"music of distinctive beauty with disarming theatre sense.'"

An opera with the same title and plot was composed by Danish composer Hans Abrahamsen, with libretto by Henrik Engelbrecht.

== Synopsis ==
- Prologue – An introductory narrative about a sinister hobgoblin, whose malevolent mirror breaks into a million pieces, is spoken by the soprano over a muttering accompaniment of whispering with percussion played by all members of the ensemble.
- Scene 1 – Gerda and her brother Kay sing a lullaby-trio with their grandmother. Kay goes too near the window and is abducted by the Snow Queen. The composer has said that the music in the scene "hovers between Schoenbergian expressionism and Grieg with hints of Kurt Weill."
- Scene 2 – Gerda sets out on her journey to the North Pole in order to rescue Kay. A witch holds her captive for a period in a magic garden, but eventually lets her continue her quest. The music in this scene switches between Hungarian Gypsy and Klezmer style.
- Scene 3 is entirely composed in the manner of a Baroque opera, complete with a fugal overture, Handelian recitatives and melismatic arias and a chorus, reminiscent of a Bach cantata. During the scene Gerda meets a talking crow and a prince and princess who lends her a golden coach.
- Scene 4 is a bizarre cabaret in which Gerda is captured by a band of robbers. There is a revolution during which the instrumental ensemble invade the stage and sing marxist choruses. The violinist leads the robber band, singing whilst playing.
- Scene 5 is a homage to Wagner and contains several quotations from the Ring Cycle. Gerda meets a Reindeer who helps her on her journey north. En route, they encounter wise women of Finland and Lapland who speak mysterious prophecies to them.
- Scene 6 is at the North Pole. The music of the Snow Queen's palace sounds like a Javanese gamelan but when the Snow Queen appears she sings a terrifyingly long and virtuosic aria in Anglo Saxon verse. The music, composed in parallel time signatures is an unusual mix of Stravinsky and a kind of serial jazz. Finally Gerda sings the opening lullaby to her brother and the ice splinter in his heart melts. They walk out of the Snow Queen's palace and go home. The Snow Queen, left all alone, laments her loss accompanied by a melodian. The chorus sings quietly in response, hinting at the possibility of redemption.

== Sources ==
- Robert Maycock, Review of the first performance of The Snow Queen
- White, Michael (January 1, 1996). "Review of the first full staging of The Snow Queen". The Independent. London, England. Archived from the original on May 17, 2011 – via HighBeam Research.
