= Michael Irwin (author) =

Thomas Arthur Michael Irwin (born 3 May 1934) is a British Emeritus Professor of English at the University of Kent and author of several works of fiction, as well as scholarly books. His 2013 novel, The Skull and the Nightingale is, according to WorldCat, held in more than 500 libraries.

== Early life and education ==
Irwin was born in London, and was educated at William Ellis School, Camden and Exeter College, Oxford. He earned a BLitt and MA.

== Career ==
Irwin taught at John Paul II Catholic University of Lublin (1958–1959), the University of Tokyo (1961–1963), the University of Łódź (1963–1965) and Smith College, Massachusetts (1965–1967) before joining the newly established University of Kent in 1967 where he became Professor of English.

During his career Irwin wrote three books related to the field of English literature. He wrote introductions to a number of editions of classic Victorian novels. He also wrote two novels early in his career.

In 2001 Irwin retired, becoming Professor Emeritus. He served as the Chairman of the Thomas Hardy Society from 2005 until 2008. He contributed criticism and analysis of Hardy's works to several books and journals.

Irwin also translated a number of opera libretti, mostly for Kent Opera and wrote the lyrics for Brunel (opera project) and other original musical works.

In 2013 he wrote a novel, The Skull and the Nightingale, which has received a number of positive reviews.

== Bibliography ==
Fiction:

- Working Orders (Andre Deutsch, 1969)
- Striker (Andre Deutsch, 1985)
- The Skull and the Nightingale (HarperCollins, 2013)

Non-fiction:

- Henry Fielding: the Tentative Realist (Clarendon Press, 1967)
- Picturing: Description and Illusion in the Nineteenth-Century Novel (George Allen and Unwin, 1979)
- Reading Hardy’s Landscapes (Macmillan, 2000)

== Personal life ==
Irwin has four children, a daughter from his first marriage to Donia Etherington, and two daughters and a son with his wife Stella. The couple lived together in Canterbury, Kent, until her death in 2015.
