= Matthew King (composer, born 1967) =

British composer, pianist and educator

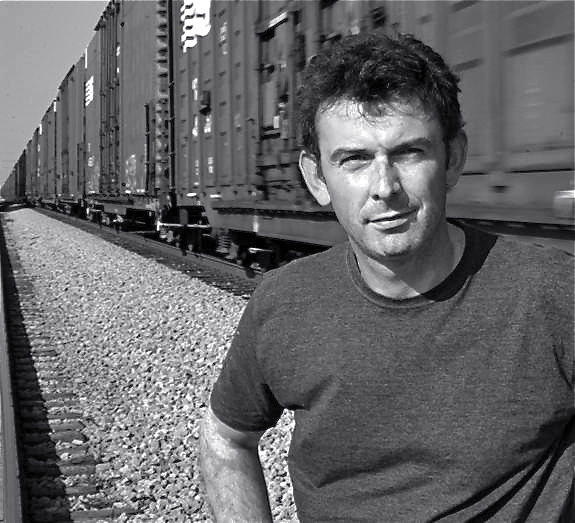
King by the railroad tracks in Grabill, Indiana, in the US

Matthew King (born 1967) is a British composer, pianist, and educator. His works include opera, piano and chamber music, and choral and orchestral pieces. He has been described by Judith Weir, Master of the Queen’s Music, as “one of Britain's most adventurous composers, utterly skilled, imaginative, and resourceful." Matthew King has a YouTube channel called 'The Music Professor'.

== Operas ==
Several of King's pieces incorporate a community component, combining amateurs and young people with professionals.

King's first chamber opera, The Snow Queen, was composed for the British soprano Jane Manning and her virtuoso ensemble Jane's Minstrels. The Snow Queen was described by one reviewer as "music of distinctive beauty with disarming theater sense."

The opera Jonah, with a libretto by Michael Irwin (author), was commissioned by the Canterbury Festival and first produced in Canterbury Cathedral in 1996; the dramatic cantata Gethsemane was premiered by Florilegium at the Spitalfields Festival in 1998; the Brunel (opera project), featured on BBC Radio 4's Setting Brunel to Music in October 2003.

The community opera On London Fields (libretto by Alasdair Middleton), and winner of a Royal Philharmonic Society Award in 2005, was described by Stephen Pettitt in the Evening Standard as "unafraid of complexity, even when writing for very young performers. Some of the clashing rhythms and textural layerings are mind-boggling.".

The cantata Hear our Voice (co-written with the British composer Jonathan Dove) was premiered in London, Nuremberg and Prague in 2006.

The chamber opera Das Babylon Experiment (German libretto by Michael Kerstan) was produced in Nuremberg in 2008.

King's experimental cantata, Schoenberg in Hollywood (libretto by Alasdair Middleton), premiered in Guildhall School of Music and Drama's Milton Court concert hall in 2015. His comic faux-Baroque cantata Il Pastoral, urbanology e il Suburbano (libretto by Alasdair Middleton) was first performed at Snape Maltings, Aldeburgh in 2015. King's chamber opera The Pied Piper (libretto by Michael Irwin (author)) was first produced at Stour Music Festival in 2015, with the British countertenor Michael Chance in the title role. The Pied Piper was subsequently revived in a new revision with German translation (Was Bleibt) in productions in Salzburg and Nuremberg in 2018. Matthew King has also made chamber orchestra reorchestrations of several of Wagner's operas.

== Instrumental works ==
Matthew King has composed a variety of instrumental works. His Robert Schumann in Three Pieces was recorded by the Avenue A ensemble. King has composed two string quartets (Quartet 2001 and Four Places in Yorkshire), both premiered by the Fitzwilliam String Quartet. His orchestral work Totentango was first performed in 2010 by the London Symphony Orchestra. His 'Hitchcockian tone poem’ called Velocity, for ensemble, chorus and big band, was premiered by the Aurora Orchestra in 2011. Blue, a rhapsody for piano and chamber orchestra, was written in 2011 for the Savant pianist Derek Paravicini, with whom Matthew King had previously improvised on BBC Radio 4 in 2009. In 2018 King composed a new three-movement piano concerto for Derek Paravicini, which premiered at the Mainly Mozart Festival in San Diego, conducted by Michael Francis (conductor). Matthew King's orchestral piece Richard Wagner in Venice: a Symphony (2021) is an elaboration of sketches made by Richard Wagner before his death in Venice in 1883.

King has experimented with unusual combinations of instruments and unconventional performing environments. The King's Wood Symphony (2007), for multiple horns, percussion, and an electronic score by Nye Parry, the work utilizes the harmonic spectra of natural horns and electronically altered horn sounds calling to each other across a vast performing space. King's Wood Symphony also gave rise to two chamber works, a trio for violin, horn and piano, and a nonet of horns with electronics, both premiered in the Wigmore Hall in 2007. A community project in 2008 produced the Odyssean Variations, premiered by the British cellist Natalie Clein and an orchestra of young musicians from the London Borough of Hackney, at LSO St Luke's in London. Una Piccolo Sinfonia (2011) is a miniature symphony in three movements for an ensemble of nine piccolos.

King embarked on a series of increasingly political protest pieces, including Fix This (2012) for piano, violin, cello, electric guitar and two percussionists, first performed at the Royal Northern College of Music. Fix This references theme tunes and catchphrases associated with Jimmy Savile.

== Piano works ==
As part of his doctoral research into the experimental creative application of sonata form in contemporary piano composition, Matthew King composed more than 45 single-movement piano sonatas between 2019 and 2023. This cycle explored a variety of topics including Hildegard of Bingen, Scarlatti, Virginia Woolf, Agatha Christie, Erik Satie, Venice, Duke Ellington, David Bowie, Bernard Herrman, Federico Mompou, Italian Opera, Irish Folk Music, Morton Feldman, Derek Jarman and Bill Evans, among others. King's piano miniature Sonatas (2005) takes a minute to perform and contains a succession of 32 bars, quoting all of Beethoven’s piano sonatas in chronological order.

== Educator ==
From 1998 to 2001, King was head of composition at the Yehudi Menuhin School and is professor of composition at Guildhall School of Music & Drama. He has led workshops for Hackney Music Development Trust, and for Bridging Arts in Salzburg; he guest-leads the Wigmore Study Group at the Wigmore Hall in London. He has presented programmes on BBC Radio 4 and Radio 3.

== Selected works ==
- The Snow Queen (Chamber Opera) 1992
- Jonah (opera/oratorio) 1996
- Gethsemane (chamber oratorio) 1998
- Ash on the Ground (Symphonic Variations for Avenue A) 1998
- Love in a Life (soprano and ensemble) 2000
- Night Phantoms and Rocking Horses (ensemble) 2000
- Quartet 2001 (String Quartet) 2001
- Four Places in Yorkshire (String Quartet) 2004
- On London Fields (Community Opera) 2004 (winner of 2005 RPS Education Award)
- Brunel (opera project) 2004
- Sonatas (Piano solo) 2005
- The Darker side of Mechanical Perfection (orchestra) 2005
- Hear our Voice (community cantata) 2006 (written in collaboration with Jonathan Dove)
- King's Wood Symphony (horns, percussion and electronics) 2007 (written in collaboration with Nye Parry and commissioned by Stour Valley Arts and Wigmore Hall
- Odyssean Variations (cello and orchestra) 2008
- Das Babylon Experiment (chamber opera) 2008
- Totentango (commissioned by the London Symphony Orchestra) 2009
- Blue (piano and orchestra) 2011
- Velocity (ensemble, big band, cellos and chorus) 2011
- Una Piccolo Sinfonia (for 9 piccolos) 2001
- A Glass Slipper (ballet) 2012
- Out of the Depths (chorus and orchestra) 2012
- Cure of Souls (string quartet, piano and electronics) 2012
- Fix This (violin, cello, electric guitar, piano and percussion) 2012
- Schoenberg in Hollywood (SSAATTBB, flute, clarinet, trumpet, trombone, violin, viola, cello, piano, percussion) 2015 (commissioned by Guildhall Vocal Dept. with words by Alasdair Middleton)
- Ringing Changes (SATB, harp, piano and electronics) 2015 (commissioned by the University of Kent for its 50th anniversary, with words by poet Patricia Debney)
- The Pied Piper (Chamber Opera) 2015 (commissioned by Stour Music) with libretto by Michael Irwin (author))
- Il Pastorale, l'Urbano e il Suburbano (soprano, tenor and chorus, flute, violin, cello, harpsichord, theorbo, saxophone and electronics) 2015 (commissioned by the Brook Street Band, with words by Alasdair Middleton)
- Rumi Songs (mezzo-soprano and piano) 2015
- Piano Sonatas (Volume 1) 2018
- Piano Concerto (Piano and chamber orchestra) 2018 commissioned by the Mainly Mozart Festival, San Diego
