= Brunel (opera project) =

The Brunel opera project is a collaboration between Matthew King (composer), Nye Parry (sound design) and Michael Irwin (libretto) to write a dramatic work based on the life and work of Isambard Kingdom Brunel. The opera was the subject of a special feature on BBC Radio 4, broadcast in October 2003, and the project has been documented in detail in the book, The Reflective Conservatoire. The opera remains a work in progress and has yet to be performed in its entirety.

In October 2003, the critic, Martin Hoyle, wrote in the Financial Times:

The musical excerpts (from Brunel) sounded immediately attractive, richer and more varied than the long littleness of Adams's Nixon in China or the arid wastes of Glass's Akhnaten: characterised vocally and grateful to sing, unlike most modern operas.

The part of Brunel is sung by a tenor. There are choruses of labourers, critics, widows and ghosts. The orchestra is an ensemble of brass instruments, sometimes employed in a manner reminiscent of Brunel's contemporaries Berlioz and Wagner, sometimes imitating mysterious industrial sounds (such as the hiss of steam). The electronic score incorporates sampled industrial sounds which are sometimes "tuned" in order to fit the harmonic landscape of the music.
