= Cristiano Giuseppe Lidarti =

Austrian composer (1730–1793)

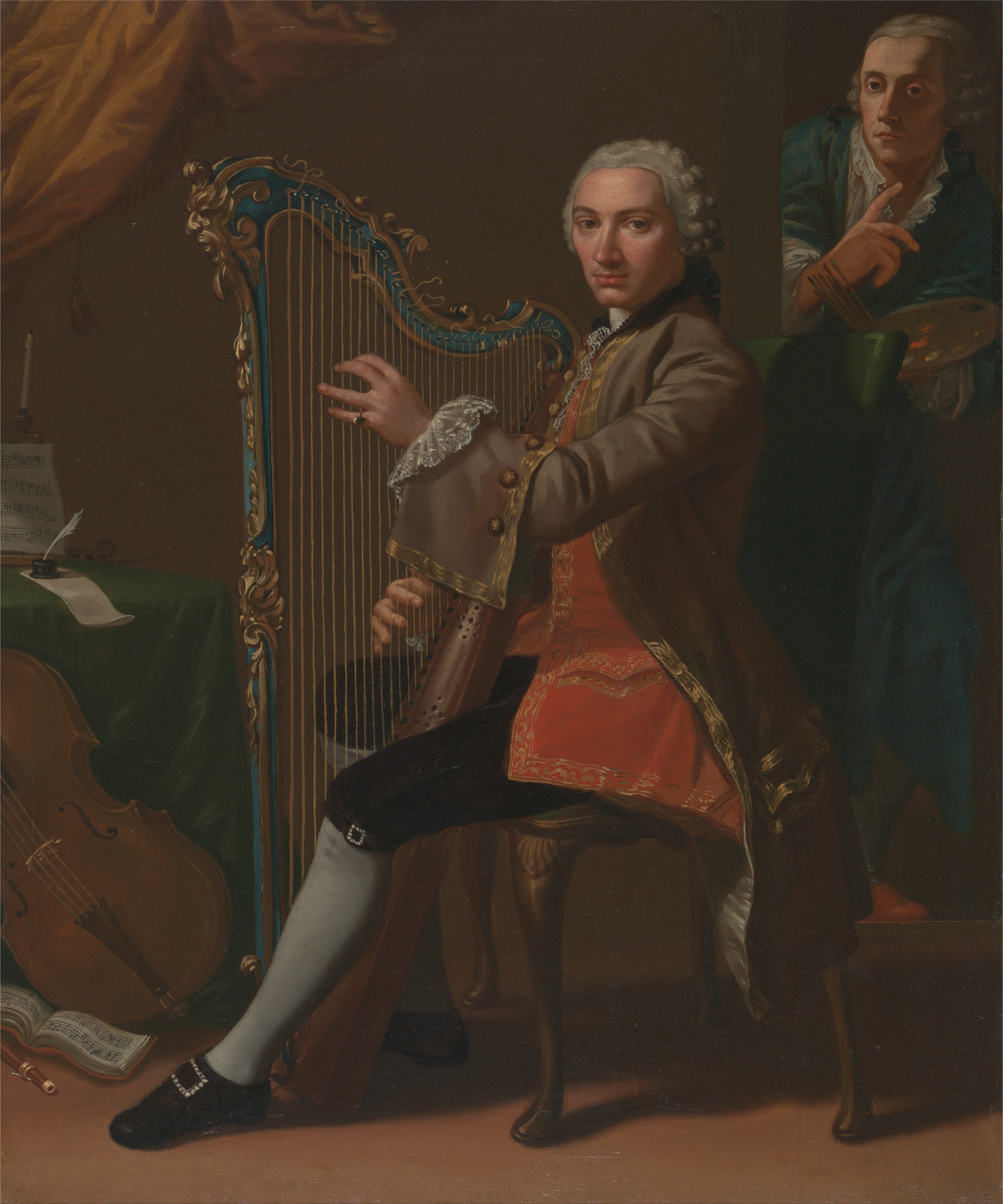
Cristiano Giuseppe Lidarti and Giovanni Battista Tempesti by Nathaniel Dance-Holland, 1759–60

Cristiano Giuseppe Lidarti (born Christian Joseph Lidarti) (Vienna 23 February 1730 – Pisa(?) after 1793) was an Austrian composer, born in Vienna of Italian descent.

== Life ==
Lidarti was a nephew of the Viennese Kapellmeister Giuseppe Bonno. While at University in Vienna, studying philosophy and law, he also began to learn to play the harp and harpsichord. In 1757 he studied with Niccolò Jommelli in Rome. Until 1784 he was a musician at chapel of the Cavalieri di S. Stefano in Pisa. His last known composition is dated 1793.

In 1770, the English musician Charles Burney met Lidarti in Pisa during his travels in Italy. In 1774 Lidarti wrote an autobiography, Aneddoti musicali. Most of Lidarti's compositions were for chamber ensembles; they also include a number of concertos and they were distinct from his more famous contemporaries Haydn and Mozart.

== Ester ==
Lidarti is noted for his oratorio Ester (Hebrew: תשועת ישראל על ידי אסתר - The Salvation of Israel by the Hands of Esther) composed in 1774 to a Hebrew libretto for the Jewish community in Amsterdam, for which he also wrote some settings of religious music. Ester is believed to be the first work of the oratorio form in Hebrew. The libretto was created by Rabbi Jacob Saraval, based on the libretto for the 1732 version of the oratorio Esther by George Frideric Handel. Lidarti's music was lost until rediscovered in London in 1997.

== Discography ==
- Musica da camera e concerto per clavicembalo. Auser Musici, cond. Carlo Ipata. Tactus Records TC.733701 (2003)
- Violin Concertos. Auser Musici, cond. Carlo Ipata. Hyperion Records CDA67685 (2008)
- Esther - oratorio en langue hébraïque. Orchestre National de Montpellier, cond. Friedemann Layer. Accord, 4761255 (2003)

== Notes ==
=== Sources ===
- Conway, David, 2012. Jewry in Music: Entry to the Profession from the Enlightenment to Richard Wagner. Cambridge: Cambridge University Press. ISBN 9781107015388
- Fabris, Dinko (2008). Lidarti: Violin Concertos (CD booklet). Hyperion Records CDA67685
