= Derek Paravicini =

English pianist (born 1979)

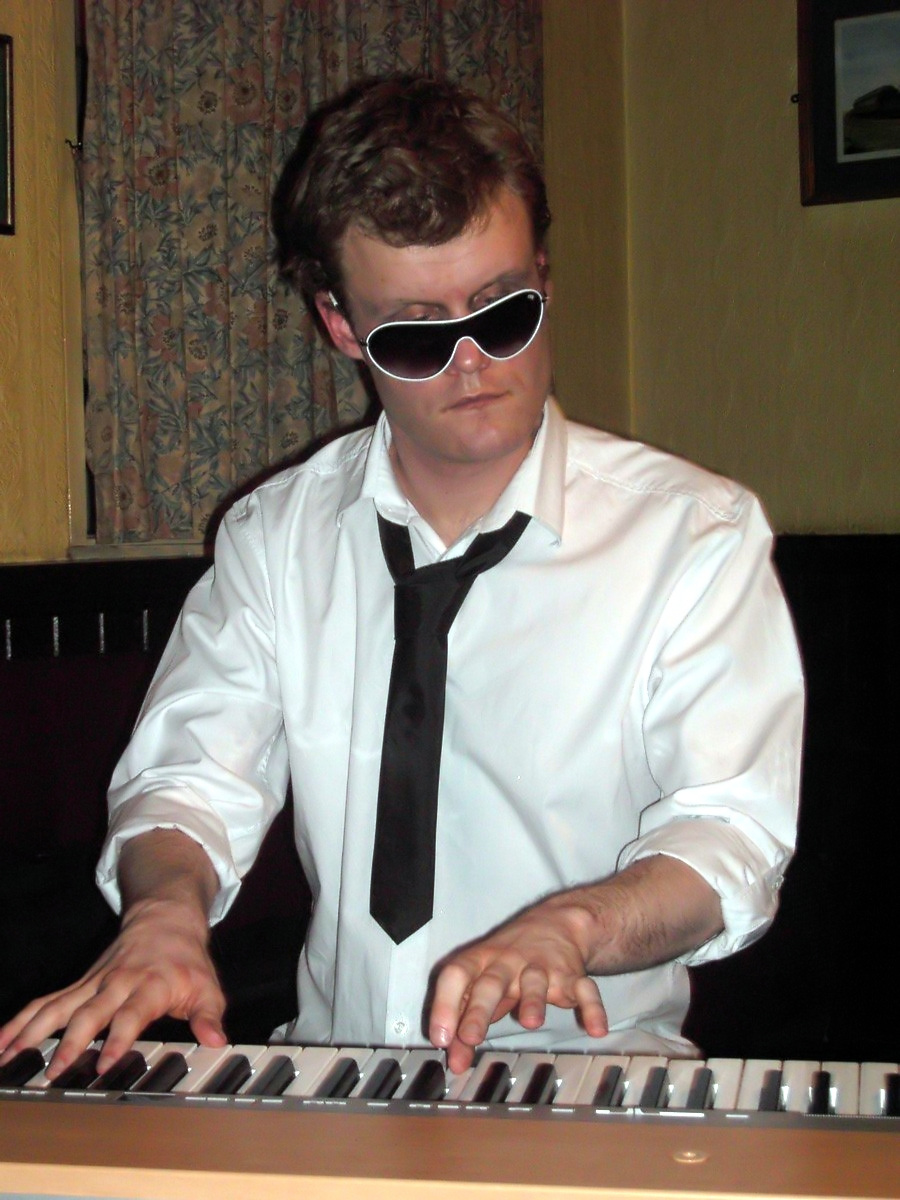
- Paravicini in 2008
- Born: 26 July 1979 (age 47); Reading, Berkshire, England
- Occupation: Pianist
- Relatives: Ann de Trafford (grandmother); Andrew Parker Bowles (uncle)
- Website: derekparavicini.com

Derek Paravicini (born 26 July 1979) is an English savant pianist. He resides in London.

== Biography ==
On 26 July 1979, Paravicini was born at the Royal Berkshire Hospital in Reading, He was born extremely prematurely, at 25 weeks, along with a twin sister who did not survive birth. He was blinded by an overdose of oxygen therapy given during his time in a neonatal intensive care unit. This also affected his developing brain, resulting in him having a severe learning disability. He also is considered to be on the autism spectrum.

Paravicini has absolute pitch and can play any piece of music after hearing it once. He began playing the piano at the age of two when his nanny gave him an old keyboard. His parents arranged for him to attend the Linden Lodge School for the Blind in London. On his introductory visit to the school, in the music room he broke free from his parents, then headed straight for a piano being played. He pushed the player aside to take over. The player encouraged him and arranged first weekly and then daily lessons. At age seven, Paravicini gave his first concert, at Tooting Leisure Centre in South London.

In 1989, at the age of nine, Paravicini had his first major public concert at the Barbican Hall in London where he played with the Royal Philharmonic Pops Orchestra. In that year, he appeared on Wogan and was the main subject of a documentary called Musical Savants.

When he was older, he was presented with a Barnardo's Children's Champion Award by Diana, Princess of Wales, for his performances at age seven and nine. More opportunities followed, including playing at Ronnie Scott's Jazz Club.

Paravicini's first album Echoes of the Sounds to Be was released on 27 September 2006. His official biography, In the Key of Genius by Adam Ockelford, was published in the UK by Hutchinson (ISBN 978-0091796129) on 3 May 2007.

=== Notable features and performances ===
Paravicini has appeared on various television programmes. He was featured on an episode of Channel 5's Extraordinary People, in an episode titled "The Musical Genius." This showed his journey to Las Vegas to play in a charity concert with another savant, Rex Lewis-Clack. He was interviewed twice by Lesley Stahl for 60 Minutes. In 2009, he was one of the subjects of the NOVA series' episode "Musical Minds", featuring neurologist Oliver Sacks, on PBS. He was featured a second time by 60 Minutes on 14 March 2010. In 2009, he performed for the former Chancellor Alistair Darling, and unexpectedly played "Big Spender".

On 26 August 2010, Paravicini was featured on the History Channel's Stan Lee's Superhumans. On the show, he was subjected to testing which verified his savantism and musical ability. After Paravicini improvised at two pianos with the composer Matthew King for a radio programme made for BBC Radio 4, they collaborated on a new piano concerto entitled Blue. It was first performed in September 2011 by the Orchestra of St John's in the Queen Elizabeth Hall, London. This is believed to be the first work for piano and orchestra ever composed for someone with learning disabilities. It was the subject of a feature on BBC News in September 2011.

On 9 March 2013, Paravicini appeared with Adam Ockelford at TEDxWarwick. During the talk, Ockelford discussed Paravicini's amazing musical abilities, while Paravicini demonstrated them.

On 27 December 2017, Paravicini was featured on an episode of Mind Field with Michael Stevens. The episode explored his musical ability and the science of the mind of a savant.

== Family ==
Paravicini is the son of Nicolas Vincent Somerset Paravicini and Mary Ann Parker Bowles, sister of Andrew Parker Bowles. Paravicini's aunt by marriage was Camilla Shand, who later became Queen. He is the grandson of Vincent Rudolph Paravicini and his wife Elizabeth Hope, Baroness Glendevon (née Maugham), a great-grandson of author W. Somerset Maugham and great-great-grandson of Thomas John Barnardo. His stepmother is Susan Rose "Sukie" Phipps (born 1941), who was brought up by Fitzroy Maclean, one of the models for James Bond. His first cousins include food writer Tom Parker Bowles and Laura Lopes, the children of Queen Camilla and her ex-husband.

After Paravicini's parents divorced, there were legal questions raised about his care. On 13 May 2010, Paravicini made legal history when the United Kingdom's last remaining secret court was opened for the first time to discuss his future care. The Court of Protection, which controls the future of adults incapable of managing their own affairs, appointed Paravicini's family to look after his welfare and commercial future. Until that legal decision was made, the Official Solicitor from the Ministry of Justice had been looking after his affairs.

== Bibliography ==
- Ockelford, Adam: In the Key of Genius: The Extraordinary Life of Derek Paravicini, Arrow, 2008. ISBN 978-0099513582.

== See also ==
- Leslie Lemke, blind American savant and musician
