= On London Fields =

Opera by Matthew King and Alasdair Middleton

On London Fields is an opera in two acts by Matthew King with a libretto by Alasdair Middleton, notable for its use of multiple ensembles and choruses. Some of the music was devised during a series of improvisational workshops. It was commissioned by Hackney Music Development Trust and premiered in the Hackney Empire theatre in 2004. The opera has been described by the novelist, Margaret Drabble as "one of the most exciting community events I’ve ever seen." The story concerns the life and prophecies of the 17th Century mystic and resident of Hackney, Hannah Trapnell. The opera is set in Hackney during the oppressive reign of Oliver Cromwell. Hannah leads the people of Hackney on to London Fields where, in a series of increasingly vivid prophecies, she sings of a new proto-Marxist Kingdom of Heaven. Among her followers are an idealistic young couple called Deborah and Abel. Eventually the meeting is brutally suppressed by a group of Puritan soldiers led by Sir Bawnagayne Surly. Abel tries to oppose the soldiers and is killed. The opera ends with his young widow singing a poignant lullaby to the couple's unborn child.

For the original production Matthew King composed for a cast of four professional singers (Sally Burgess, Alison Buchanan, Simon Thorpe and Jonathan Gunthorpe) and several choruses of Hackney residents, including a children's choir and a Gospel choir. The orchestra was the Academy of St Martin in the Fields, supported by Young Jazz Hackney; the Cambridge Heath Salvation Army Band; Hackney Centre for Young Musicians, a Turkish Saz band and an African Drumming group called Emashi. The opera makes use of spatial distribution of players and instrumentalists with the brass band playing in the upper circle of the theatre and other groups distributed around the building and off-stage. The opera critic and musicologist, Rodney Milnes, described the event in the following terms:

The scale was daunting. There were five orchestras, with the Academy of St Martin in the Fields in the pit, plus jazz and brass bands (Henze would like that) dotted about the auditorium...There were more than 150 singers, of every known age, race and gender.

Writing in The Evening Standard, Stephen Pettitt was also largely enthusiastic about the work:

King's music is eminently approachable, veering between jazz and a sort of energetic minimalism. Even so, he’s unafraid of complexity, even when writing for very young performers. Some of the clashing rhythms and textural layerings are mind-boggling.

In 2005 On London Fields received the Royal Philharmonic Society Education Award.
