= Blue (piano concerto) =

Blue is a piano concerto by British composer Matthew King, composed specially for the autistic savant pianist Derek Paravicini. The concerto grew out of an improvisation session between the pianist and composer for BBC Radio 4 programme called The Inner World of Music. during which King and Paravicini extemporised in numerous styles. Fascinated by Paravicini's ability to improvise using advanced harmonies, similar to Maurice Ravel or Alexander Scriabin, King improvised with him for several sessions, slowly devising a work that came to use a number of themes from George Gershwin as the basis for a large single movement piece in extended sonata form. A number of themes appear upside down. The concerto begins with a depiction of musical chaos, out of which thematic ideas gradually appear.

The concerto was premiered in 2011 at the Southbank Centre in London with Derek Paravicini as soloist, and the Orchestra of St John's, conducted by John Lubbock. The collaboration between King and Paravicini was the subject of a feature on BBC News in September 2011.
