= Jonathan Dove =

English composer (b1959)

Jonathan Dove CBE
- Born: 18 July 1959 (age 66); London, England
- Genres: Opera, classical
- Occupation: Composer

Jonathan Dove CBE (born 18 July 1959) is an English composer of opera, choral works, plays, films, and orchestral and chamber music. He has arranged a number of operas for English Touring Opera and the City of Birmingham Touring Opera (now Birmingham Opera Company), including in 1990 an 18-player two-evening adaptation of Wagner's Der Ring des Nibelungen for CBTO. He was Artistic Director of the Spitalfields Festival from 2001 to 2006.

Dove was born in London; both his parents were architects. He studied music at the University of Cambridge, under Robin Holloway, and afterwards worked as a freelance arranger and accompanist until 1987, when he was employed by Glyndebourne Opera.

In 1998 Dove was joint winner of the Christopher Whelen Award for his work in the fields of theatre music and opera. He was appointed Commander of the Order of the British Empire (CBE) in the 2019 Birthday Honours for services to music.

In 2024 Dove's opera Itch received an Ivor Novello Award nomination for Best Stage Work Composition at The Ivors Classical Awards.

In November 2025 Dove won an Ivor Novello Award for Best Community and Participation Composition for his opera Uprising.

== Productions ==
Productions of Dove's works include:

- Airport Scenes, an orchestral suite from the airport-comedy opera Flight, was premiered by the University of Warwick Symphony Orchestra on 7 March 2006.
- The Australian premiere (the Glyndebourne Festival Opera production) of Flight in March 2006, at the Adelaide Festival under the artistic direction of Brett Sheehy, won Australia's Best Opera award at the national Helpmann Awards.
- The Enchanted Pig, libretto by Alasdair Middleton, was premièred at the Young Vic, London in December 2006 and toured parts of the UK in early 2007.
- The Adventures of Pinocchio, libretto by Alasdair Middleton, was commissioned by Opera North and Sadler's Wells Theatre, and premièred at the Grand Theatre Leeds on 21 December 2007. The US première was performed by the Minnesota Opera on 28 February 2009 in St. Paul, Minnesota.
- The London premiere of Flight was performed by British Youth Opera in September 2008.
- Swanhunter, a chamber opera based on the Lemminkäinen legend, was premiered by Opera North in late 2009.
- Mansfield Park, a chamber opera based on the Jane Austen novel of the same name, was premiered by Heritage Opera in summer 2011.
- NZ Opera staged Mansfield Park at Settlers Country Manor in Waimāuku in April 2024 as part of its New Zealand season.
- Life Is a Dream, a full-scale opera with a libretto by Alasdair Middleton based on the play by Pedro Calderón de la Barca, was premiered by Birmingham Opera Company in March 2012.

== Works ==
Dove's works include:

=== Operas ===
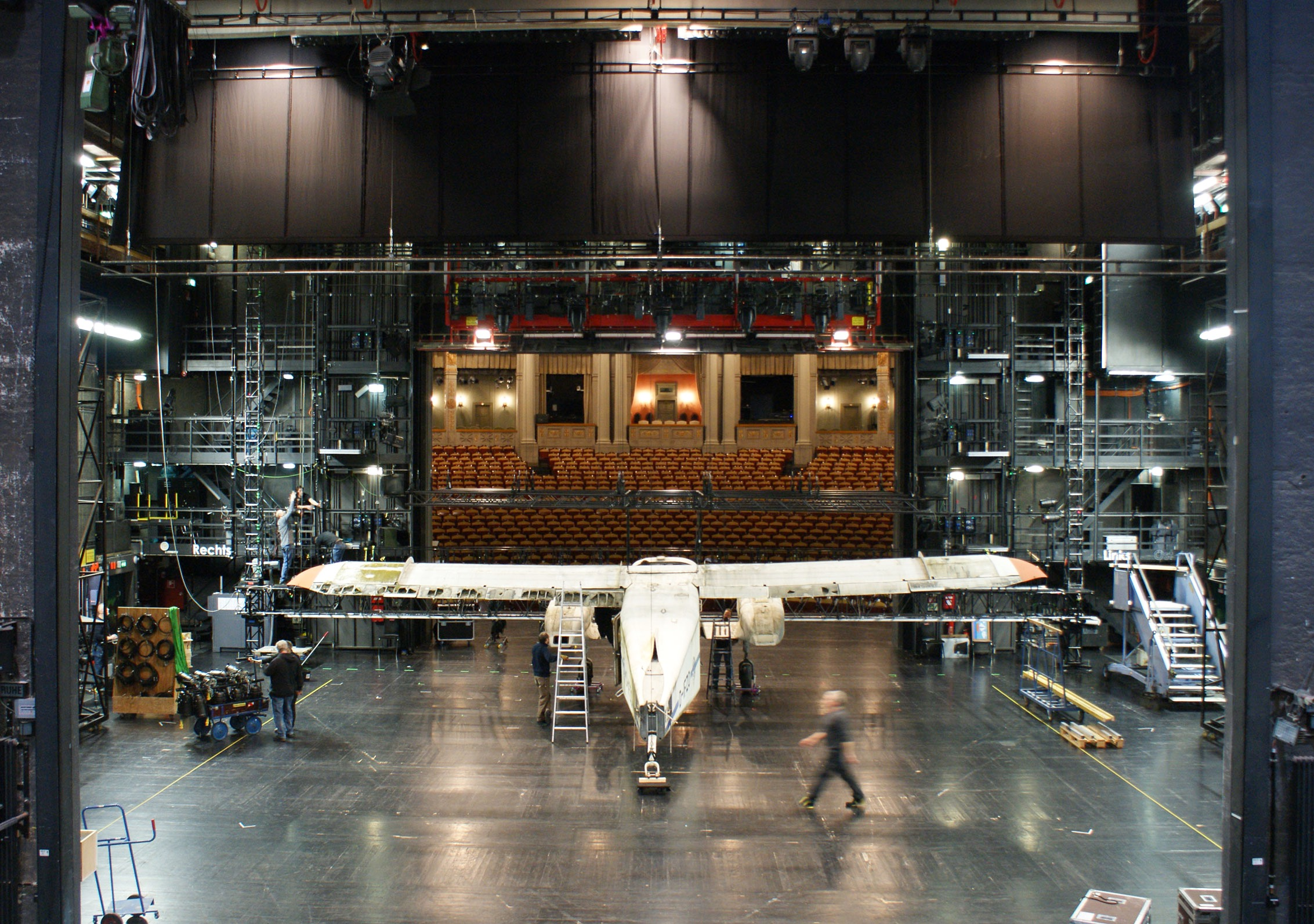
Flight (1998), backstage at the Prinzregententheater in Munich, February 2017

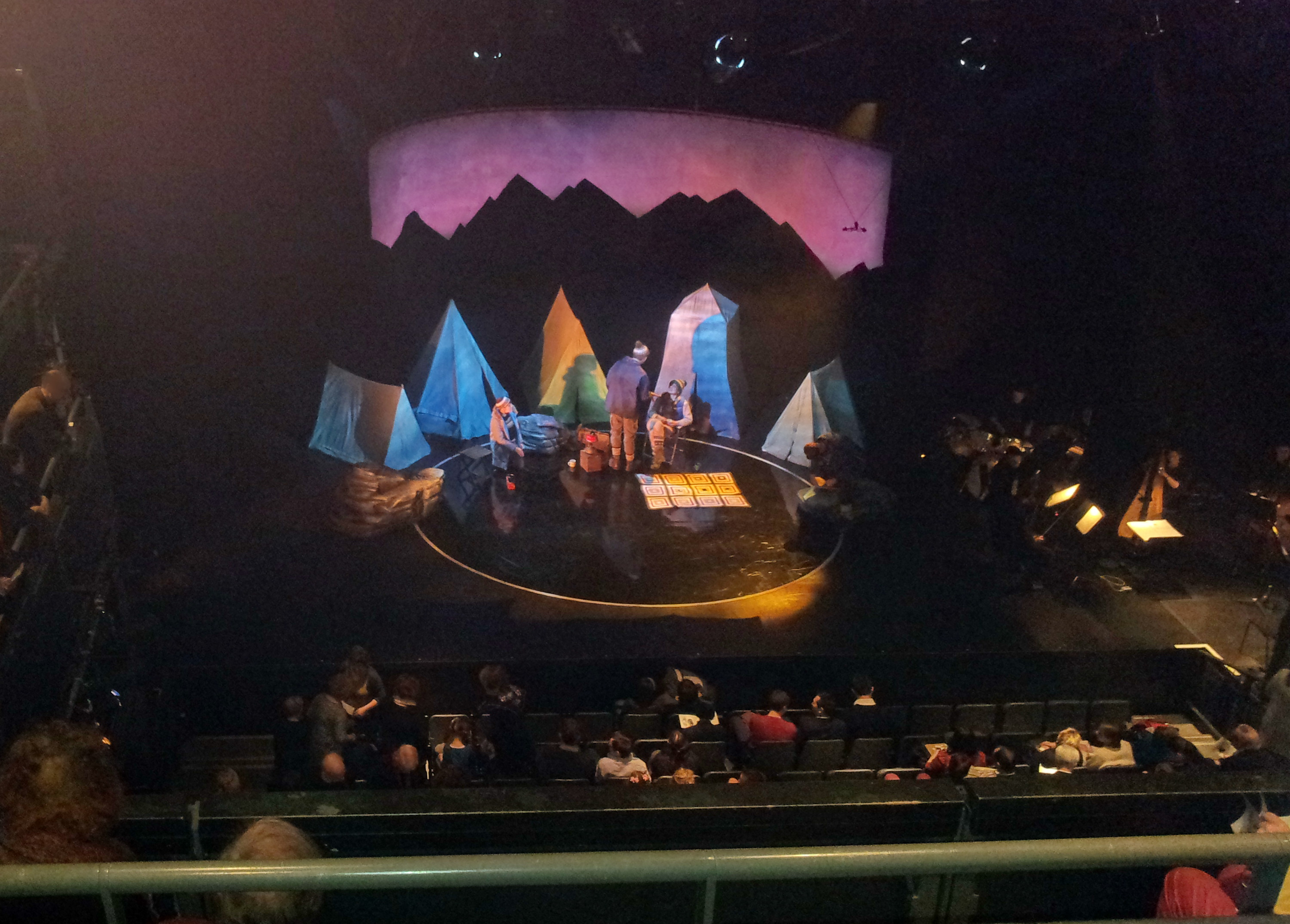
Swanhunter (2009), performed at the Linbury Studio Theatre (ROH) in London, April 2015

- Hastings Spring (community opera) (1990)
- Siren Song (1994) First performance on 14th July 1994 at the Almeida Theatre, London
- Flight (1998)
- Tobias and the Angel (church opera), to a libretto by David Lan (1999). Premiered at St Matthew's, Perry Beeches.
- The Palace in the Sky (community opera) (2000)
- L'altra Euridice (2002)
- When She Died... (Death of a Princess) (television opera, commemorating the fifth anniversary of the death of Diana, Princess of Wales) (2002)
- Man on the Moon (television opera, about Buzz Aldrin, second man to walk on the Moon, and the effects the experience had on him and his marriage) (2006)
- The Enchanted Pig (chamber opera) (2006)
- Hear Our Voice (community opera) in partnership with Matthew King (2006), libretto by Tertia Sefton-Green. http://www.hmdt.org.uk/inschool_hearourvoice_1.html
- The Adventures of Pinocchio (2007)
- Swanhunter (2009)
- Mansfield Park (2011)
- Life Is a Dream (2012)
- The Day After (2015)
- The Monster in the Maze (2015)
- Marx in London (2018)
- Itch (2023)
- Uprising (community opera) (2025)

=== Other works ===
- Figures in the Garden (wind serenade) (1991)
- The Passing of the Year (song cycle for double chorus and piano) (2000) 20th-century
- The Magic Flute Dances (flute concerto) (2000)
- The Three Kings, written for the service of Nine Lessons and Carols at King's College, Cambridge in 2000
- Stargazer (a trombone concerto written for Ian Bousfield)
- Köthener Messe, for choir and chamber ensemble
- Out of Winter (song-cycle)
- "Seek Him that maketh the Seven Stars" (choral work; setting of Amos 5:8)
- His Dark Materials Part I & II (incidental music) (2003)
- On Spital Fields (community cantata) (2005)
- Hojoki – "An Account of my Hut" (Counter-Tenor and Orchestra)
- I am the day (Carol – SATB)
- Vadam et circuibo civitatem
- Missa Brevis
- Ecce Beatam Lucem (composed for Ralph Allwood and the 1997 Eton Choral Course)
- There Was a Child (oratorio for soprano, tenor, chorus, and children's choirs) (2009)
- In Damascus, a song-cycle for tenor and string quartet inspired by the Syrian refugee crisis, commissioned by the Sacconi Quartet and performed by the Sacconi Quartet and Mark Padmore.
- Unknown Soldier. (Choral and Orchestral Music)
- Sappho Sings, written for Ralph Woodward and Fairhaven Singers (2019)
- Between Friends (2019) for two pianos – commissioned for the London Piano Festival and written in memory of Dove's friend Graeme Mitchison
- Gaspard's Foxtrot (2020) A Musical Tale for Narrator and Orchestra from the book by Zeb Soanes
- In Exile for baritone, cello and orchestra, libretto Alasdair Middleton (2020), written for the City of Birmingham Symphony Orchestra
- String Quartet No. 2, On the streets and in the sky (2021)
