= Jacob Raphael Saraval =

Jacob Raphael ben Simhah Judah Saraval (c. 1707 – 1782) was an Italian Rabbi, man of letters, and musician. Saraval was born in Venice.

Saraval was one of the rabbis of Venice who supported Jacob Emden in his dispute with Jonathan Eybeschutz. He communicated with the English scholar, Kennicott, on subjects of biblical philology. In 1752 he was appointed rabbi of Mantua and many documents in the communal archives bear his signature. During the 1760s and 1770s he traveled to Holland and England on behalf of his community. When the anti-Jewish lawyer, Giovanni Battista Benedetti of Ferrara, published his Dissertazione della Religione e del Giuramento degli Ebrei at the beginning of the 1770s, Saraval rejoined with Lettera apologetica (Mantua, 1775). He was also known as a preacher, poet, and composer of piyyutim (liturgical poems), and engaged in various branches of secular culture—arts, literature, and music, in which fields he wrote many works. In addition, he translated from various languages.

One of his translations, the libretto of Handel's oratorio Esther (apparently done at the request of the Jews of England and Holland), is one of the first free verse translations from English to Hebrew without recourse to the traditional meters. The Hebrew text was set to music by Cristiano Lidarti in 1774.
