= Alasdair Middleton =

British writer

Alasdair Middleton is a leading British opera librettist and playwright with librettos commissioned by the Royal Opera House, Opera North and the Berlin Philharmonic among others. He is responsible for a series of important operatic collaborations with the British composer Jonathan Dove including The Enchanted Pig and The Adventures of Pinocchio. He has also worked extensively with the choreographer Will Tuckett both as librettist and co-director, and has written several works with Matthew King including the award-winning community opera On London Fields. Middleton’s plays include Aeschylean Nasty, Shame on you Charlotte, Casta Diva and Einmal. He teaches the Junior Drama Classes at the Guildhall School of Music and Drama.

== Opera libretti ==
- Everything Money Can Buy (The Opera Group)
- Out Of The Ordinary (The Opera Group)
- The World Was All Before Them; composer, Matthew King
- Lessons from Harmony; composer, Matthew King
- On London Fields; composer, Matthew King (2005)
- The Hackney Chronicles; composer, Jonathan Dove
- Red Riding Hood; composer, Jonathan Dove
- On Spital Fields; composer, Jonathan Dove (2006)
- The Enchanted Pig; composer, Jonathan Dove (The Opera Group at the Young Vic, 2006)
- The Adventures of Pinocchio; composer, Jonathan Dove (Opera North / Sadlers Wells, 2007)
- The Feathered Friend; composer, Helen Chadwick (Riverside Studios)
- A Bird in Your Ear; composer, David Bruce, Bard College, New York, March 2008
- Swanhunter; composer, Jonathan Dove (2009)
- Mansfield Park, composer, Jonathan Dove (2011)
- Schoenberg in Hollywood; composer, Matthew King (2015)
- Il Pastorale, l'Urbano e il Suburbano; composer, Matthew King (2015)
- Odyssey; composer, Jonathan Dove (2023)

== Play ==
- Einmal (Stoked Festival, 2007)

== Published works ==
- The Enchanted Pig (Oberon Modern Plays, 2008) ISBN 978-1-84002-717-4, ISBN 1-84002-717-7
