= John Rawnsley =

British operatic baritone, actor and vocal coach

John Rawnsley (born 14 December 1950) is an English actor and opera singer. He is a baritone and has sung in the San Diego Opera. He sang the title role of Figaro in the 1981 film adaptation of Rossini's The Barber of Seville, and also the title role of Verdi's Rigoletto in Jonathan Miller's famous 'Mafia' production at the English National Opera. Opera critics have offered positive reviews of his performances in Verdi's "Rigoletto". Anthony Tommasini of the New York Times has praised Rawnsley's performance in Rigoletto as "affecting".

He appeared as Nigel in the 2012 film Quartet.

Rawnsley married actress and singer Nuala Willis in 1979.
