= The Long Walk to Finchley =

2008 television film

- BBC DVD Cover
- Starring: Andrea Riseborough; Rory Kinnear; Samuel West; Geoffrey Palmer
- Composers: Srdjan Kurpjel and Mario Takoushis
- Country of origin: United Kingdom
- Original language: English

Production
- Executive producers: Robert Cooper, Kate Triggs, Bethan Jones
- Producer: Madonna Baptiste
- Production location: Simon Nixon
- Cinematography: Jan Jonaeus (photography)
- Editor: Anthony Combes
- Running time: 84 minutes

Original release
- Network: BBC Four
- Release: 12 June 2008

Related
- Margaret

Margaret Thatcher: The Long Walk to Finchley, subtitled in the initial credits How Maggie Might Have Done It, is a 2008 BBC Four television drama based on the early political career of the young Margaret Thatcher (née Roberts), from her attempts to gain a seat in Dartford in 1949 via invasion to her first successful campaign to win a parliamentary seat, Finchley, in 1959. It also portrays her early relationship and marriage with Denis Thatcher.

It is directed by Niall MacCormick, produced by Madonna Baptiste and written by Tony Saint – it was made by Great Meadows Productions. Thatcher is played by Andrea Riseborough, Denis by Rory Kinnear and Edward Heath by Samuel West.

It was followed in February 2009 by Margaret, a drama on Thatcher's fall from power filmed in 2008–09, with Thatcher played by Lindsay Duncan.

== Production ==
It was announced in August 2007, and filming began in London in the summer of 2007 (the black-and-white mock-newsreel footage of Roberts' electioneering in Dartford features the Church of Christ the King, and the terraced house from which she is picked up by Denis is the History Department of University College London).

It was to have been aired in February 2008, but was postponed to avoid offence to its subject (a scream of "fucking establishment!" by the Thatcher character had already been cut from the drama at her supporters' request, and replaced with "Damn their establishment!").

== Reception ==
It was eventually broadcast at 9pm on Thursday 12 June 2008. Even prior to broadcast, the drama's portrayal of Thatcher as young and flirtatious has been criticised both by her supporters and opponents (one of the latter called the casting of Riseborough as "ludicrously flattering" to Thatcher).

Reception of the drama after broadcast, however, was generally positive, with particular note taken of tongue-in-cheek references to future events (Margaret promises that, were she in charge, "every child in the country would have as much milk as they wanted", as against her later reputation as "milk-snatcher Thatcher"; and the Thatcher children make remarks related to their future notoriety for a Dakar Rally incident and an attempted African coup involving Mark Thatcher and appearance on "I'm a Celebrity, Get Me Out of Here!" involving Carol Thatcher in a jungle respectively). Crowder also speaks the line "A grocer's daughter. A grocer, Heath?!?" to Heath in contempt of Margaret's background, making reference to Heath's later nickname of Grocer Heath.

On 27 March 2009 The Long Walk to Finchley won 3 Broadcasting Press Guild Awards – Best Single Drama, Best Multichannel Programme and Best Actress (Andrea Riseborough).

== Plot ==
Margaret Roberts gains a role as a chemist researching ice cream and in her spare time pursues her political ambitions with her father's help and begins her relationship with Denis Thatcher. She is nominated the Conservative candidate for the constituency of Dartford in the run-up to the 1950 election, and is openly optimistic despite most other Conservatives' opinion that no Conservative can win the seat, let alone a woman. During the election campaign, she meets Edward Heath, candidate for the key marginal seat of Bexley. He is suspicious of her populist and publicity-seeking style, but less overtly hostile to her than more reactionary figures in the party such as Waldron Smithers.

Overall national party strategy is for Roberts to draw Labour attention away from Bexley and Chislehurst (also being fought by a woman, Patricia Hornsby-Smith) to enable these two key marginal seats to be won. This Margaret does, and Bexley and Chislehurst are duly won, but Margaret herself is beaten at Dartford by the Labour candidate (despite reducing his majority). Her relationship with Denis founders and she decides that she must improve her chances of finding a new and winnable seat. To this end she decides to leave science and study for the Bar.

At a Conservative ball, Miss Hornsby-Smith engineers a meeting between Margaret and the shy and (it is implied) possibly homosexual Heath. Margaret flirts with him in an attempt to better her political career, and asks him a question which the audience does not hear (though they do hear Heath stating "we must never speak of this again"). Having failed to begin a relationship with Heath, she recommences her relationship with Denis and pre-empts and accepts his proposal of marriage. Her teetotal father accepts her choice, despite concerns over Denis's status as a non-teetotaller and a divorcé and the marriage taking place in London, not their hometown of Grantham.

She again fails to win Dartford at the 1951 election and writes to console Heath on the death of his mother, to whom he was close. Even on their honeymoon, Margaret is keen to take on a candidacy for the safe Conservative seat of Canterbury, but in the meantime, Heath convinces the Canterbury Conservative Association not to select her. Margaret finds herself pregnant but takes the Bar exam nevertheless, shortly afterward giving birth to twins. Happy that this provides her with an instant nuclear family for her political ends rather than expressing conventional maternal joy, Margaret then fails to win the candidacy for Smithers's seat of Orpington but is convinced out of a brief exit from the political world by Denis when her frustration at being cut off from that world soon becomes apparent.

She tries and fails to gain a candidacy at Beckenham, Hemel Hempstead and Maidstone, up against old boy networks, prejudice against her due to being a woman, a mother and a grocer's daughter and the party's preference for male war veterans. Frustrated at the shattering of her dreams of a political career being meritocratic, Margaret is in despair. Denis, however, suggests that she does not play by the old-boys' rules but instead uses what they perceive as her weakness (being a woman) against them. Margaret takes up his suggestion, going blonde and—through a show of tears in an interview with Donald Kaberry, chairman of candidates—receiving information of a possible candidacy in Finchley. The seat has a safe Conservative majority, but its present holder John Crowder is not managing that majority well and an alternative holder is being considered.

Thatcher is shortlisted for the candidacy and, though the misogynistic Crowder tries to convince Heath (now Chief Whip) to oppose Thatcher, she retains Kaberry's support. She hopes Denis will accompany her to the selection panel, but goes ahead without him when he cannot return from Africa in time. She reaches the final two and on the way to this final hustings silences Crowder's open contempt for her and her chances by pouring scorn on his unremarkable political career. Her speech wins over even the woman in the audience whom Crowder had primed to oppose her and Margaret wins the candidacy.

Crowder takes his complaints as to Margaret's takeover of the constituency to Heath, but Heath reveals that instead of warning the Finchley Conservatives off supporting Thatcher as Crowder had asked, he instead threatened them with dire penalties if they did not support her, partly in response to Crowder's slights against her working-class parentage (Heath's father was also working class). Crowder prophesies that, once into the House of Commons, Margaret will "never stop".

Margaret then wins Finchley in the 1959 election and arrives at the House. There, Heath avoids and ignores her and has a flashback to the Conservative ball earlier in the drama—her question is revealed to have been a request to be helped by him into parliament, to return the favour for her helping him win Bexley. He is stung by her taking credit for his win at Bexley instead of simply taking up the "hand of friendship" he had been on the verge of offering her. The film then returns to 1959 and fades on Heath walking past her (breaking off ties with her and secretly tormented by Crowder's prophecy and his own forebodings of her future career) and Margaret's impassive, steely but ambiguous reaction to this. An onscreen message then refers to her beating him in the 1975 Conservative leadership election.

== Cast ==
- Andrea Riseborough – Margaret Thatcher
- Rory Kinnear – Denis Thatcher
- Samuel West – Edward Heath
- Philip Jackson – Alfred Roberts
- Julia Joyce – Young Carol Thatcher
- Michael Selwood – Young Mark Thatcher
- Michael Cochrane – Sir Waldron Smithers
- Sylvestra Le Touzel – Patricia Hornsby-Smith
- Geoffrey Palmer – Sir John Crowder
- Oliver Ford Davies – Sir Donald Kaberry
- Michael Gould – John Miller
- Lydia Leonard – Joyce, Margaret's ice-cream research colleague
- Marcia Warren – Old Dear
- Christian Rodska – Lieut-Col Digby
- Georgie Glen – Miss Harris
- Geoff McGivern – Dartford Returning Officer / TV & Radio announcer
- James Laurenson – Leslie Thomas
- Claire Voudsen – Nanny
- Rob Edwards – Hemel Member / John Wells / Sumner
- Geoffrey Whitehead – Entwhislte / Lt Col Allason
- Kim Wall – Lichfield / Horsfield / Orpington member
- Angela Sims – Beckenham Constituent
- Robert Whitelock – Bert
- Jonathan Aris – Stanley Soward
- Jeremy Child – Langton
- Geoffrey Beevers – Head Panellist at Finchley
- Elizabeth Bennett – Doreen / Interviewer

== DVD release ==
The programme was released on Region 2 DVD by BBC Video on 16 June 2008.

== See also ==
- Cultural depictions of Margaret Thatcher
