= Eric Lubbock, 4th Baron Avebury =

English politician (1928–2016)

The Right Honourable The Lord Avebury
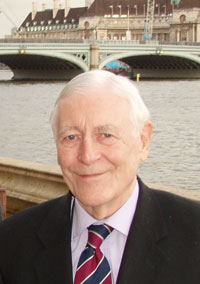
- Lord Avebury in 2006

Chief Whip of the Liberal Party
- In office 1963 – 18 June 1970
- Leader: Jo Grimond; Jeremy Thorpe
- Preceded by: Arthur Holt
- Succeeded by: David Steel

Member of Parliament for Orpington
- In office 14 March 1962 – 29 May 1970
- Preceded by: Donald Sumner
- Succeeded by: Ivor Stanbrook

Member of the House of Lords
- Lord Temporal
- Hereditary peerage 20 September 1971 – 11 November 1999
- Preceded by: The 3rd Baron Avebury
- Succeeded by: Seat abolished
- Elected Hereditary Peer; 11 November 1999 – 14 February 2016
- Election: 1999
- Preceded by: Seat established
- Succeeded by: The 3rd Viscount Thurso

Personal details
- Born: Eric Reginald Lubbock; 29 September 1928 London, England
- Died: 14 February 2016 (aged 87) London, England
- Party: Liberal (before 1988); Liberal Democrat (after 1988)
- Spouses: Kina-Maria O'Kelly de Gallagh (m. 1953; div. 1983); Lindsay Stewart (m. 1985)
- Children: 4, including Lyulph
- Education: Upper Canada College; Harrow School; Balliol College, Oxford
- Awards: Ahmadiyya Muslim Peace Prize (2009)
- Lubbock's voice Eric Lubbock interview at the National Liberal Club, January 2015

Eric Reginald Lubbock, 4th Baron Avebury (29 September 1928 – 14 February 2016), was an English politician and human rights campaigner. He served as the Liberal Member of Parliament for Orpington from 1962 to 1970. He then served in the House of Lords, having inherited the title of Baron Avebury in 1971, until his death. In 1999, when most hereditary peers were removed from the House of Lords, he was elected by his fellow Liberal Democrats to remain. When he died, he was the longest serving Liberal Democrat peer.

== Early life and career ==
A descendant of William Lubbock (1701–1754), he was born in Chelsea, London, the son of Maurice Fox Pitt Lubbock (the sixth son of John Lubbock, 1st Baron Avebury) and Mary Katherine Adelaide Stanley, daughter of Arthur Stanley, 5th Baron Stanley of Alderley.

Lubbock was educated at Upper Canada College, an all-boys private school in Toronto, Canada, and at Harrow School, an all-boys public school in London. He read Engineering Science at Balliol College, Oxford.

He served as a Lieutenant in the Welsh Guards and joined Rolls-Royce in 1951. At the company, he was employed as a production manager (1951–1956) and as a production engineer (1956–1960).

From 1969 to 1983 he was chairman of British computer manufacturer Digico Limited.

== Parliamentary career ==
Having joined the Liberal Party in 1960 and become a councillor the following year, Lubbock stood as his party's candidate at the Orpington by-election in March 1962, and gained the seat with a majority of 7,855, a swing of nearly 22% from the Conservatives. At the time, the victory was seen as a revival of the Liberal Party, and brought the number of Liberal MPs to seven. However, the party did not make the anticipated recovery. It was hampered by organisational difficulties, and progress was slow, with a loss of votes and seats during the period of Harold Wilson's Labour government.

Lubbock held Orpington in 1964 and 1966, both times against Guinness World Records founder Norris McWhirter. "When I beat McWhirter for the second time in 1966", Lubbock said in 2015, "he said at the count that he now realised that the people in Orpington were only interested in their back gardens. And I was very pleased by that because it confirmed my attempts to look after people's local concerns."

As the MP for Orpington, Lubbock was appointed Chief Whip by Jo Grimond in 1963, a post he held until 1970. When Grimond resigned as party leader in 1967, Lubbock was one of the three Liberal MPs who stood for the position. Jeremy Thorpe won the contest with six votes, with Emlyn Hooson and Lubbock getting three apiece.

As the only Liberal on the Speaker's Conference on Electoral Reform from 1963 to 1965, he attempted to reduce the voting age to 18 and to introduce the Single Transferable Vote system of Proportional Representation for general elections.

Lubbock initiated the Caravan Sites Act 1968 as a Private member's bill, which mandated that councils assess and provide for the needs of Gypsy, Roma and Traveller people passing through their boroughs, in order to provide unused land for them to camp on. 324 sites were created in all, but many councils "delayed, minimized or completely avoided provision of the sites for Gypsies in England." The perceived ineffectiveness of the Act led to its repeal by the Conservative government in 1994.

In the Commons, Lubbock was on the Speaker's Commission on Electoral Law (1964–1966), and proposed STV in multi-member constituencies, only to be voted down by 18–1. He also proposed reducing the voting age to 18, and two Labour Members supported him. Orpington reverted to being a Conservative seat at the 1970 general election. On losing the seat Lubbock said, "In 1962 the wise, far-seeing people of Orpington elected me as their Member; in 1970 the fools threw me out" (it is sometimes reported he said "the bloody fools").

The following year, John Lubbock, 3rd Baron Avebury, died without a male heir and Eric Lubbock, his cousin, succeeded him. As Baron Avebury, he sat on the Royal Commission on Standards of Conduct in Public Life (1974–1976), and was Liberal Spokesman on Immigration and Race Relations (1971–1983). Throughout his time in politics he was involved in human rights activism, both in and beyond Parliament. In 1976, he founded the Parliamentary Human Rights Group, which he chaired for the next 21 years. He continued as Vice-Chair after standing down.

In 1974, Avebury was asked by Liberal leader Jeremy Thorpe to lead the Liberal general election campaign that year.

In 1987, as a jocular protest against the cost of cremation, he offered to leave his body to Battersea dogs home "to vary the inmates' diet." Bill Wadman-Taylor, manager of the home, said: "I am sure there is a lot of nutritional value in the noble Lord and the dogs are not fussy, but we just couldn't do it." On being advised that the dogs would probably accept but the home's management wouldn't, he made the same offer to the cats.

He was a member of the Liberal Democrat Foreign Affairs Team, speaking on conflict resolution and human rights.

== Human rights ==
In a 2014 Huffington Post article, Avebury noted that "When I founded the Parliamentary Human Rights group in 1976, I hoped to work with recently independent countries to promote the UN's treaties on civil and political rights." He chaired the group until 1997 and served as Vice-chair until his death, along with the Labour MP and former leader Jeremy Corbyn. Following Avebury's death, Corbyn described him as a "Great friend, brave and determined human rights campaigner who dedicated his life to rights of all."

Avebury was a keen advocate of human rights and the separation of church and state. He was as a patron of the British Humanist Association and an honorary associate of the National Secular Society, which awarded him Secularist of the Year 2009 for his role alongside Evan Harris in the abolition of blasphemous libel. In September 2010, Avebury, along with 54 other public figures, signed an open letter for the British Humanist Association in The Guardian, stating their opposition to Pope Benedict XVI's state visit to the UK.

Avebury visited Eastern Turkey, Syria and Iraq during the 1990s on fact-finding missions to investigate human rights abuses against the Kurdish minority groups in those countries. Subsequent reports published by the Parliamentary Human Rights Group resulted in a ten-year ban from entering Turkey. He was also banned from entering Kashmir and East Timor.

While banned from Turkey, Avebury campaigned against the involvement of UK construction company Balfour Beatty in the Ilisu Dam project in Turkey's Kurdish region, appearing on the Mark Thomas Comedy Product in 2001 to talk about the issue. In another episode of Thomas' series, he described Avebury as "the one Lord of any use and relevance" when describing how they met at a House of Lords meeting on Kurdish rights in Turkey.

He was President of the Peru Support Group, campaigning on human rights issues in Peru, and a Patron of Peace Brigades International, meeting with South American human rights defenders and raising their cases in Parliament. He was a Patron of Prisoners Abroad, a charity that supports the welfare of Britons imprisoned overseas and their families. Lord Avebury was a Co-Chair of the CHT (Chittagong Hill Tracts) Commission, which monitors the implementation of the CHT Peace Accord by the Bangladesh Government, and a member of the All Party Parliamentary Humanist Group.

He frequently raised matters related to British nationality law in Parliament. He was a strong supporter of the citizenship rights of the solely British ethnic minorities in Hong Kong, and fought for their rights.

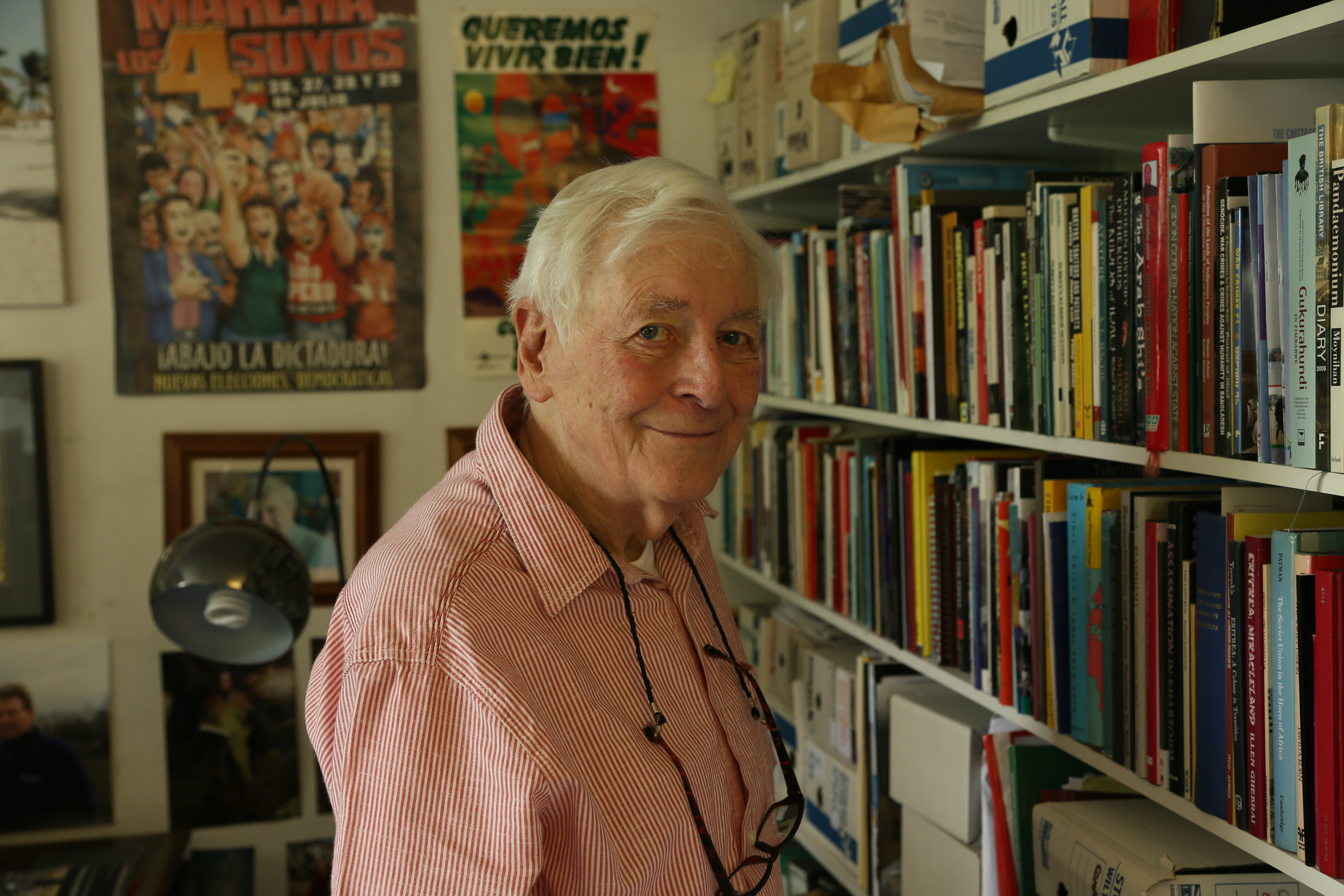
Lord Avebury in his office at his home in South London in 2014

In 1964 he sought a review of the Timothy Evans case. Evans was subsequently granted a posthumous pardon.

In recognition of his lifetime human rights work, Lubbock was made the inaugural recipient of the Ahmadiyya Muslim Peace Prize at the National Peace Symposium hosted at the Baitul Futuh Mosque in South London in 2009.

Writing for Travellers' Times, the writer and artist Damian Le Bas noted Avebury's 50-year commitment to improving the lives of the Gypsy, Roma, Traveller community in the UK, calling him "one of the greatest friends the Travellers ever had."

Avebury was a board member of the Gulf Center for Human Rights. Its chairperson, Maryam Alkhawaja, noted on his death that "Lord Eric Avebury supported Bahraini activists when no one else would, and continued to support the next generation of activists throughout the years. He died on the fifth anniversary of the Bahraini uprising, and I know that many of us will carry his memory with us throughout the struggle."

As a backbench Liberal Democrat peer in the House of Lords during the 2010–2015 parliament, he repeatedly voted against his own party on issues like the Bedroom Tax, which he opposed, and cuts to Legal Aid.

The Dictionary of Liberal Biography called Avebury "a scourge of tyrants in Central and South America, Asia and Africa", noting that he had been detained twice while pursuing human rights causes in Sri Lanka and Guyana.

=== Maurice Lubbock Memorial Fund ===
Trained as an engineer, Lord Avebury retained an interest in science and engineering. Together with his mother in 1957, he set up the Maurice Lubbock Memorial Fund to commemorate his father, following his early death. This established a Trust, which he chaired for 56 years, aimed at supporting Engineering and Management at Balliol College, Oxford. The Trust is still active and is one of the longest lasting of such ventures. He was elected to an Honorary Fellowship at Balliol College in 2004.

=== Conservation Society ===
Lubbock was the President of the Conservation Society from 1972 to 1984. During his presidency, he proposed a form of words to introduce the concept of 'sustainable development' into Article 2 of the Treaty of Rome in a letter to The Times of 20 January 1975. This contributed to the successful debate on changing the wording of Article 2 to include a reference to sustainable development.

== Personal life ==
Lubbock married twice:

1. Kina-Maria O'Kelly de Gallagh (married 2 September 1953; divorced 1983)
  1. Lyulph Ambrose Jonathan Lubbock, 5th Baron Avebury (born 15 June 1954); married Susan MacDonald 14 May 1977, with issue.
  2. Maurice Patrick Guy Lubbock (born 5 November 1955); married Diana Tobin 1982, with issue.
  3. Victoria Sarah Maria Lubbock (born 27 April 1959); married Alan Binnie 1983, with issue.
2. Lindsay Jean Stewart (married 1985)
  1. John William Stewart Lubbock (born 8 August 1985)

Lord Avebury lived in Camberwell, London. He was an atheist and humanist; he was both a member of the All Party Parliamentary Humanist Group and a patron of the British Humanist Association. He reconciled his humanist beliefs with Buddhism, and lived as a secular Buddhist.

Lubbock was a boxer at Oxford and a boxing blue, he was also the president of Orpington Boxing Club and competed for the club in a charity bout to raise funds for the club.

He died at his home in London on 14 February 2016 from myelofibrosis. He is buried near St. Giles Church, Farnborough, near Orpington, Kent.

Parliament of the United Kingdom
Preceded by Donald Sumner	Member of Parliament for Orpington; 1962–1970	Succeeded by Ivor Stanbrook
New office created by the House of Lords Act 1999	Elected hereditary peer to the House of Lords under the House of Lords Act 1999; 1999–2016	Succeeded by The Viscount Thurso
Party political offices
Preceded by Arthur Holt	Liberal Chief Whip; 1963–1970	Succeeded by David Steel
Peerage of the United Kingdom
Preceded by John Lubbock	Baron Avebury; 1971–2016; Member of the House of Lords (1971–1999)	Succeeded by Lyulph Lubbock
Baronetage of the United Kingdom
Preceded by John Lubbock	Lubbock baronets of Lamas; 1971–2016	Succeeded by Lyulph Lubbock
