= Baron Wallace =

Baron Wallace may refer to:

- Thomas Wallace, 1st Baron Wallace (1768–1844), English politician
- George Wallace, Baron Wallace of Coslany (1906–2003), British Labour Party politician
- William Wallace, Baron Wallace of Saltaire (born 1941), British academic, writer and politician
- Jim Wallace, Baron Wallace of Tankerness (1954–2026), British politician and leader of the Scottish Liberal Democrats
