= Ivor Stanbrook =

British politician

Member of Parliament for Orpington
- In office 18 June 1970 – 16 March 1992
- Preceded by: Eric Lubbock
- Succeeded by: John Horam

Personal details
- Born: 13 January 1924 Willesden, Middlesex, England
- Died: 18 February 2004 (aged 80)
- Party: Conservative
- Spouse: Joan Clement
- Children: 2
- Education: Birkbeck, University of London; Pembroke College, Oxford; School of Oriental and African Studies; University of East Anglia
- Occupation: Politician; barrister

Ivor Robert Stanbrook (13 January 1924 – 18 February 2004) was a British Conservative party politician and barrister. He represented Orpington as its Member of Parliament from 1970 to 1992.

== Biography and early life ==
Stanbrook was born in Willesden, North London, the son of a laundry manager within the family business, the Sunlight Laundry. He was educated at Willesden High School, leaving at age 15, and became a legal assistant at Wembley Council, while taking a part-time degree in economics and law at Birkbeck College, University of London. He qualified as a pilot in 1943 and served with the RAF between 1943 and 1946. He completed postgraduate study at Pembroke College, Oxford then left for Nigeria in 1950 where he worked for ten years in the Colonial Service as District Officer in various regions of Northern and Western Nigeria, including Ilorin, Western Region. On his return, he was called to the bar at Inner Temple in 1960 and practised criminal law, and was also a night lawyer for the Daily Express.

== Political career ==
In the 1966 general election, Stanbrook was the unsuccessful Conservative candidate for the safe Labour seat of East Ham South. At the next general election in 1970, he gained Orpington with a majority of 1,332, a seat that had been represented by Eric Lubbock of the Liberal Party since the 1962 by-election.

For more than two decades he was a combative and chronically rebellious backbencher, a man who knew his own mind and spoke it, and who was often critical of his own front bench. He was a member of the 92 Group and was initially regarded as being on the right in the Conservative Party, but it is probably fairer to categorise him as a traditionalist, and the positions he took were not altogether predictable. In later years he could more fairly be described as having mellowed in his views, especially on immigration and nationality.

Described by Matthew Parris as the "very hammer of lawlessness and crime", Stanbrook served on the Parliamentary Select Committee for Home Affairs from 1983 to 1991, but was blocked from becoming its chairman in 1987 by the Labour MPs on the committee. He was a leading member of the Conservative backbench committees on Home Affairs and Northern Ireland and chaired the Conservative backbench Constitutional Committee.

Less predictably, except to those who knew his earlier career, he took the chair in 1987 of the newly created all-party anti-apartheid group, to counter the activities of the pro-South African committee led by his Conservative colleague John Carlisle. He was critical of Margaret Thatcher for appearing to condemn sanctions more than she condemned apartheid and refused to criticise the African National Congress for resorting to violence. He backed the attempt of the Eminent Persons Group to end apartheid and subsequently urged that sanctions should be strengthened, arguing that the South Africans had no intention of changing and that they could only be induced to do so by pressure, and backed their continuance in 1990.

It was not the only issue where he was at odds with Thatcher. Stanbrook had supported entry into the EEC in 1971 and he remained a passionate European. He was critical of the use of the whips against Sir Anthony Meyer's leadership challenge and in March 1990 proclaimed that Michael Heseltine was the best alternative to Thatcher: he had "dynamism, style and a softer image". He backed Heseltine's leadership challenge in November 1990 and continued to support him in the second ballot. As a result, he faced efforts to deselect him in Orpington and these may have played some part in his decision not to fight another election.

In 1979, he had argued that the BBC should be prosecuted under the prevention-of-terrorism legislation and he remained an advocate of banning Sinn Féin and for taking a tough line with terrorists.

Although a staunch European, Stanbrook also valued the Commonwealth and never ceased to urge the need to help Africa resolve its problems. He was appalled by the thought that Europe had food surpluses while parts of Africa were wracked by famine. His support for strict control of immigration was accompanied by a rooted hostility to racism.

Stanbrook served as the secretary of the Home Affairs Committee from 1974 to 1977, and as its vice-chairman from 1979 to 1982; and as the secretary from 1979 to 1981, vice-chairman from 1981 to 1989, and chairman from 1990 to 1991 of the Northern Ireland Committee. He also chaired the Constitutional Committee from 1984 until he stood down from Parliament and served as chairman of the Nigerian (1979–1992), Zambian (1983–1992) and Zimbabwean (1983) parliamentary groups. He had founded the British-Nigeria Association in 1961.

John Barnes, for The Independent, said of Stanbrook: "A man of singular energy, invariably polite and quietly spoken, he could be sharp of tongue and often found brutal phrases in which to express his strong convictions. But the private man belied the public image. Colleagues described a much more considerate, even gentle figure, revelling in books and music, pleasant and amusing. Too rebellious perhaps ever to become a minister, he nevertheless left an ineffaceable mark on the parliamentary life of his time."

== Family life ==
Stanbrook was married to Joan (née Clement) from 1946 until her death in 2000. Of his two sons, Clive Stanbrook was a barrister who died in 2018 and Lionel Stanbrook a communications consultant. He had seven grandchildren. Clive's children are Fleur, Sophie, Ivor and Isabella. Lionel's children are Jessie, Ella and Gwen.

== Later life ==
For a decade after 1980, he became a partner in Stanbrook and Hooper, the European law firm based in Brussels and founded by his son Clive. He gave up the legal profession in 1990 and, after his retirement from Parliament, concentrated on studying for a doctorate (on British Nationality) from the University of East Anglia which he obtained in 1995.

== Author ==
Stanbrook's published works include:

- Stanbrook, Ivor (1982). British Nationality: The New Law. Clement Publrs. ISBN 0-907027-02-4.
- Stanbrook, Ivor (1988). A Year in Politics: My Diary for 1986. Clement Publrs. ISBN 0-907027-12-1.
- Stanbrook, Ivor (1993). How to be an MP. Clement Publrs. ISBN 0-907027-17-2.
- Stanbrook, Ivor; Clive Stanbrook (1980). Extradition: Law and Practice. B Rose. ISBN 0-85992-162-X.
- Stanbrook, Ivor; H Summerfield. Resale Price Maintenance Act, 1964. C Knight. ISBN 0-85314-005-7.

Parliament of the United Kingdom
Preceded by Eric Lubbock	Member of Parliament for Orpington; 1970–1992	Succeeded by John Horam
