= Clive Stanbrook =

British barrister

Clive St George Clement Stanbrook QC OBE (10 April 1948 – 13 April 2018) was a British barrister who defended mercenaries in Angola and Dr Hastings Banda in Malawi.

The son of Ivor Stanbrook he was a Conservative candidate in the 1977 Greater London Council election:

Hackney South & Shoreditch
Party	Candidate	Votes	%	±%
Labour	Joan Margaret Morgan			
Conservative	Clive St George Clement Stanbrook			
National Front	David James Bruce			
