= Waldron Smithers =

British politician (1880–1954)

Sir Waldron Smithers

Member of Parliament for Orpington
- In office 5 July 1945 – 9 December 1954
- Preceded by: Constituency established
- Succeeded by: Donald Sumner

Member of Parliament for Chislehurst
- In office 29 October 1924 – 5 July 1945
- Preceded by: Robert Nesbitt
- Succeeded by: George Wallace

Personal details
- Born: 5 October 1880
- Died: 9 December 1954 (aged 74)
- Party: Conservative
- Spouse: Marjorie Page-Roberts
- Children: 4
- Parent: Alfred Smithers
- Education: Charterhouse School

Sir Waldron Smithers (5 October 1880 – 9 December 1954) was a Conservative Party politician in the United Kingdom. He was a member of Parliament for more than 30 years and an active anti-communist.

== Early life and family ==
Smithers was educated at Charterhouse and in France and became a member of the London Stock Exchange. He was the eldest son of Sir Alfred Smithers, who had been Conservative Member of Parliament (MP) for Chislehurst until 1922. In 1904 Waldron Smithers married Marjorie Page-Roberts, with whom he had two sons and two daughters.

== Politics ==
At the 1924 general election he stood for his father's constituency and won a three-cornered fight with a majority of more than 10,000. In his 30 years in the House of Commons he was always a backbencher, described by The Times as a 'diehard Tory' although well-liked on both sides of the house. In his memoirs, Way of Life, his fellow Conservative John Boyd-Carpenter described Smithers as "an extreme Tory out of a vanished age" and both deeply religious and "not insensitive to the consoling effect of alcohol". Harold Macmillan said he "fondly believed himself to be a good Tory". He was knighted in the 1934 Birthday Honours.

Smithers remained as member for Chislehurst until the 1945 general election, when he switched to the newly created Orpington constituency. Chislehurst fell to the Labour Party, but Smithers was comfortably elected in Orpington, and held the seat until he died.

In October 1945, an antisemitic petition was drawn up, with the help of Smithers's Fighting Fund for Freedom, by residents of Hampstead, requesting "that aliens of Hampstead should be repatriated to assure men and women of the Forces should have accommodation upon their return" from World War II. The petition was signed by the antisemitic Conservative mayor of Hampstead Sydney A. Boyd and four of Hampstead's Conservative councillors, with the rest of the Conservative members of the council in favour of the petition. Hampstead's Conservative MP, Charles Challen, promised to give the petition his "unstinting support" and he asked a number of questions in the House of Commons on behalf of the petitioners over the following months. When the petition was complete, Conservative Councillor J. A. Hughes passed it to Challen who, "rather than repudiate the sponsors for their antisemitism", delivered it to Parliament.

During the Cold War, while MP for Orpington, Smithers in 1947 pressed for a House of Commons Select Committee on un-British Activities to be created to conduct anti-communist investigations, to mirror the US House Un-American Activities Committee. In 1952, fearing possible sabotage, he wrote to Winston Churchill asking for an enquiry into communist influence at the BBC. "We have traitors in our midst", he wrote, "and although I should deplore suppression of free speech they should be treated as traitors." The letter was not released until January 2016.

== In drama ==
In the 2008 TV drama The Long Walk to Finchley, about the early career of Margaret Thatcher, Smithers was played by Michael Cochrane.

== Death ==
Smithers died on 9 December 1954 aged 74.

== Sources ==
- Obituary, The Times, 10 December 1954.

Parliament of the United Kingdom
Preceded by Robert Chancellor Nesbitt	Member of Parliament for Chislehurst; 1924–1945	Succeeded by George Wallace
New constituency	Member of Parliament for Orpington; 1945–1954	Succeeded by Donald Sumner
