= Donald Sumner =

Member of Parliament for Orpington
- In office 20 January 1955 – 1 October 1961
- Preceded by: Waldron Smithers
- Succeeded by: Eric Lubbock

Personal details
- Born: William Donald Massey Sumner; 13 August 1913
- Died: 12 May 1990 (aged 76)
- Party: Conservative

William Donald Massey Sumner OBE, QC (13 August 1913 – 12 May 1990), known as Donald Sumner, was a British Conservative Party politician who later became a judge.

== Career ==
Sumner was educated at Charterhouse and Sidney Sussex College, Cambridge, before training to become a barrister at Lincoln's Inn. He served with the Royal Artillery during the Second World War, where he was mentioned in despatches, and was a Lieutenant-Colonel and Assistant Adjutant-General in the 21st Army Group. In 1945 he was awarded an OBE (mil.), and was subsequently honoured with a Croix de guerre (Belgium) and an American Bronze Star.

Sumner was elected the Member of Parliament for Orpington at a by-election in January 1955. Having been the chairman of the local Conservative Association, he had defeated a young Margaret Thatcher to become the party's candidate. From 1959 to 1961 he was the parliamentary private secretary (PPS) to Jocelyn Simon, the Solicitor General, before stepping down from Parliament after accepting an appointment as a County Court judge. The resulting by-election in March 1962 was won by the Liberal Party candidate Eric Lubbock, marking the start of a revival in the fortunes of the Liberals.

Parliament of the United Kingdom
Preceded by Sir Waldron Smithers	Member of Parliament for Orpington; 1955–1961	Succeeded by Eric Lubbock
