= Patricia Hornsby-Smith, Baroness Hornsby-Smith =

British politician (1914–1985)

The Right Honourable The Baroness Hornsby-Smith DBE PC

Parliamentary Secretary to the Ministry of Health
- In office 3 November 1951 – 18 January 1957
- Prime Minister: Winston Churchill; Anthony Eden
- Preceded by: Arthur Blenkinsop
- Succeeded by: John Vaughan-Morgan

Member of the House of Lords Lord Temporal
- In office 13 May 1974 – 3 July 1985; Life Peerage

Member of Parliament for Chislehurst
- In office 18 June 1970 – 8 February 1974
- Preceded by: Alistair Macdonald
- Succeeded by: Roger Sims
- In office 23 February 1950 – 10 March 1966
- Preceded by: George Wallace
- Succeeded by: Alistair Macdonald

Personal details
- Born: Margaret Patricia Hornsby-Smith; 17 March 1914 East Sheen, Surrey, UK
- Died: 3 July 1985 (aged 71) Westminster, London, UK
- Party: Conservative

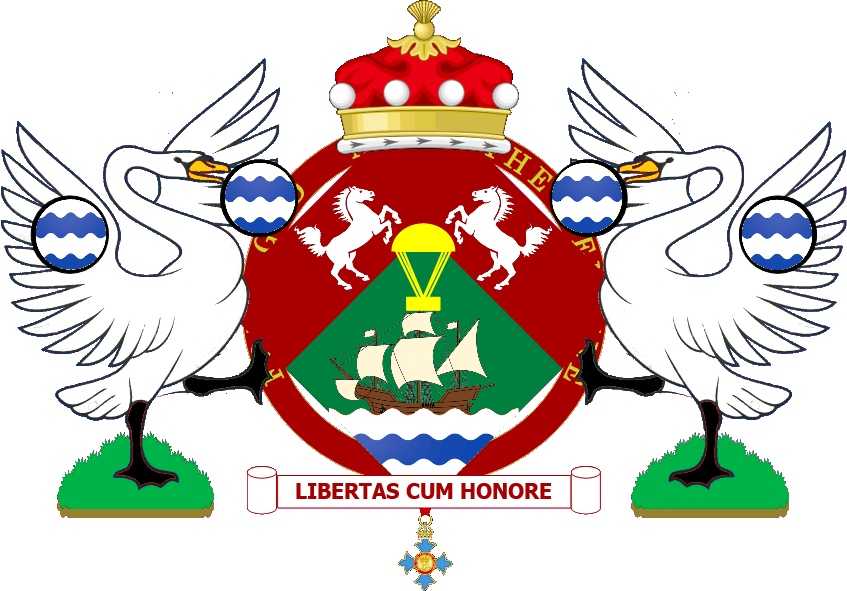
Coat of arms

Margaret Patricia Hornsby-Smith, Baroness Hornsby-Smith, DBE, PC (17 March 1914 – 3 July 1985) was a Conservative Party politician in the United Kingdom.

== Early life and education ==
Margaret Patricia Hornsby-Smith was born on 17 March 1914 in East Sheen, the second child and only daughter of shopkeeper Frederick Charles Hornsby-Smith, a saddle dealer and master umbrella maker, and his wife, Ellen (née Minter). She was educated at the local elementary school, and at Richmond County School for Girls. After leaving school she worked as a private secretary for several firms and for an employers' federation. Her interest in politics was established early and she joined the Junior Imperial League at the age of sixteen. The following year she was invited to join the Conservative Party's supporting team of speakers for the 1931 election campaign.

During the war she undertook voluntary work. In 1941 she took a job in the civil service as Principal Private Secretary to Lord Selborne, the minister of economic warfare, a post she held until the end of the war.

== Political career ==
Her political career took off after the war. She was elected for a term on Barnes council where she served from 1945 – 1949. At the 1950 general election, she was elected as Member of Parliament for Chislehurst, winning a majority of only 167 votes over the sitting Labour MP, George Wallace.

She was re-elected at the next four general elections (1951, 1955, 1959, 1964), served as Parliamentary Secretary 1951 – 1957 and was made a Privy Counsellor in 1959.

In 1964 she presented the Nurses Act to Parliament. She was appointed a Dame Commander of the Order of the British Empire (DBE) in September 1961.

At the 1966 election, she lost her seat to Labour's Alistair Macdonald, by a majority of only 810. Four years later, at the 1970 election, she regained the seat with a majority of 3363.

Constituency boundary changes implemented in the February 1974 general election encouraged Hornsby-Smith to allow Roger Sims to stand for Chislehurst, and to compete instead for the new constituency of Sidcup. However, Edward Heath also selected to run for Sidcup so Hornsby-Smith stood in another new seat; Aldridge-Brownhills. She lost to the Labour candidate Geoff Edge by just 366 votes.

Hornsby-Smith was subsequently elevated to a life peerage on 13 May 1974 as Baroness Hornsby-Smith, of Chislehurst in Greater London.

== Death and memorial ==
Patricia Hornsby-Smith died on 3 July 1985 in Westminster. Her funeral was held at Mortlake five days later. A memorial service was held on 29 October 1985 at St Margaret's, Westminster. Prime Minister Margaret Thatcher read one of the lessons.

== Other activities ==
Lady Hornsby Smith was portrayed in the 2008 drama The Long Walk to Finchley (by actress Sylvestra Le Touzel).

Parliament of the United Kingdom
Preceded by George Wallace	Member of Parliament for Chislehurst; 1950–1966	Succeeded by Alistair Macdonald
Preceded by Alistair Macdonald	Member of Parliament for Chislehurst; 1970 – February 1974	Succeeded by Roger Sims
