= Robert Nesbitt (solicitor) =

Politician and solicitor from London (1868–1944)

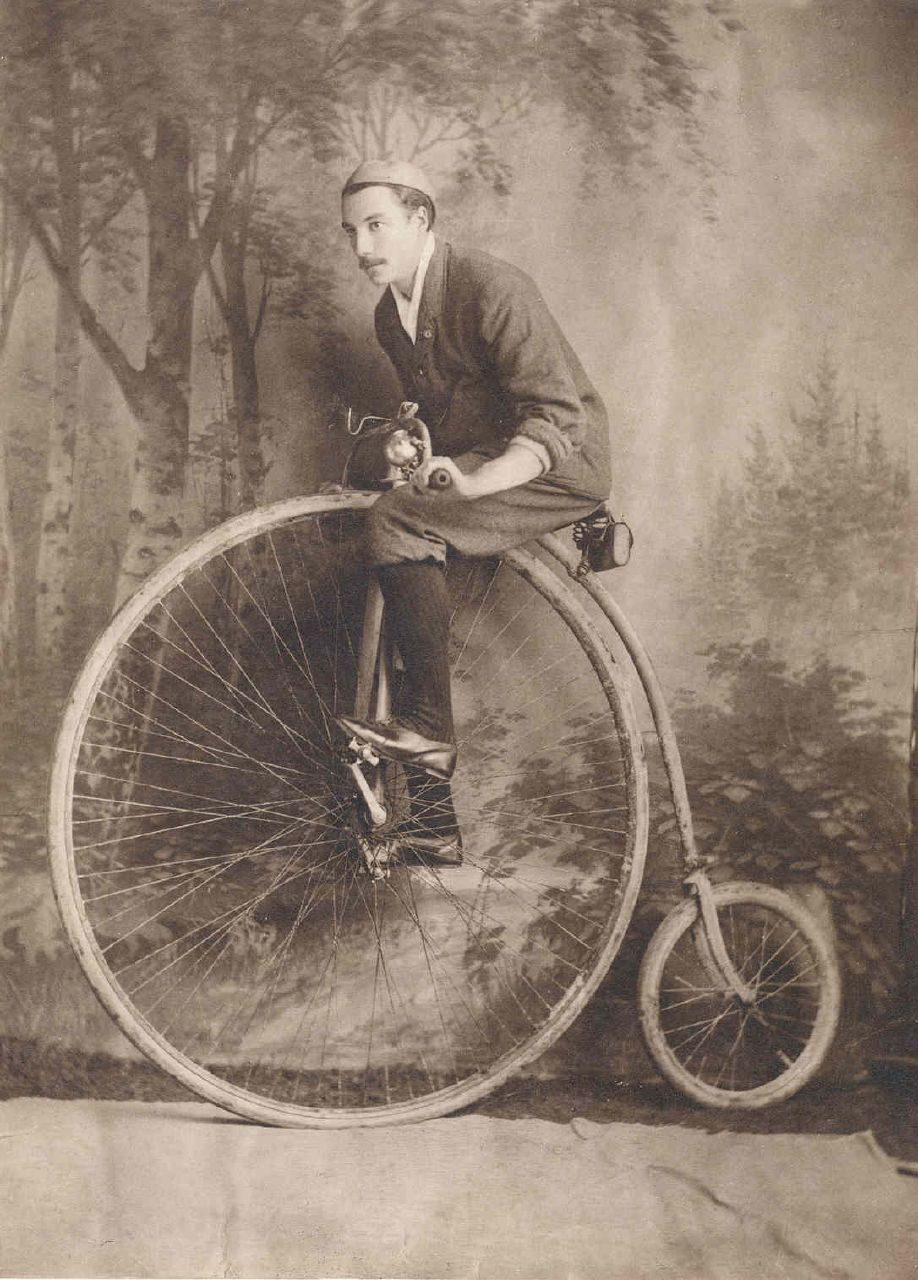
R. C. Nesbitt as cyclist, c. 1888

Robert Chancellor Nesbitt (17 November 1868 – 27 January 1944) was a distinguished solicitor in the City of London, and a Unionist politician and member of legal, financial and Church of England bodies in the early 20th century.

Nesbitt was born to Robert Henry Nesbitt, and Emma Chancellor.

As a youth, Nesbitt was a noted cyclist, riding with the Bath Road Club. His records included London to Bath and back, 16hr 10min, on 1 August 1891, and 155.5 miles on the North Roads in 12 hours, on 2 August 1890, as well as a podium finish in the 100 mile Bath Road Club road race.

Nesbitt became an advocate on the Shanghai Bar, and from 1909 to 1926 was a member of the Council of the Law Society. From 1920 to 1922 sat on the Lord Chancellor's Committee on Supreme Court Fees and on Circuit arrangements, and in 1921 he was chairman of the Special Training Grants Committee of the Ministry of Labour. He was also a director of the Union Bank of Australia, chairman of the National Mutual Life Association of Australasia, Board for Britain; and Deputy Chairman of the British Law Insurance Company.

Nesbitt was member of parliament for Chislehurst, Kent from 1922 to 1924, and secretary of Nobody's Friends in the 1930s. He was a Freeman of the Worshipful Company of Drapers, as had been his grandfather and other relatives.

Senior representative of the ancient Nisbet family of Berwickshire, Nesbitt wrote a classic family history, Nisbet of that Ilk. On 31 August 1895 he married Lilian Mary Ellis. They had one son, Robert Malleson Nesbitt.

Parliament of the United Kingdom
Preceded by Sir Alfred Smithers	Member of Parliament for Chislehurst; 1922–1924	Succeeded by Sir Waldron Smithers
