= Alistair Macdonald =

British politician (1925–1999)

Alistair Huistean Macdonald (18 May 1925 – 6 February 1999) was a British Labour Party politician.

Macdonald was educated at Dulwich College, Enfield Technical College and Corpus Christi College, Cambridge. He was a bank clerk and area treasurer of the National Union of Bank Employees. He served as a councillor on Chislehurst and Sidcup Urban District Council (1958–62) and as an alderman on the newly formed London Borough of Bromley from 1964.

Macdonald contested Beckenham in 1964. He was Member of Parliament for Chislehurst from 1966 to 1970, when he lost the seat to his Conservative predecessor, Patricia Hornsby-Smith. Macdonald's two subsequent bids for re-election in 1974 were unsuccessful, as was his further attempt to regain his seat in 1983.

Parliament of the United Kingdom
| Preceded by Patricia Hornsby-Smith | Member of Parliament for Chislehurst; 1966–1970 | Succeeded by Patricia Hornsby-Smith |
