= Gareth Bacon =

British politician (born 1972)

Gareth Bacon MP
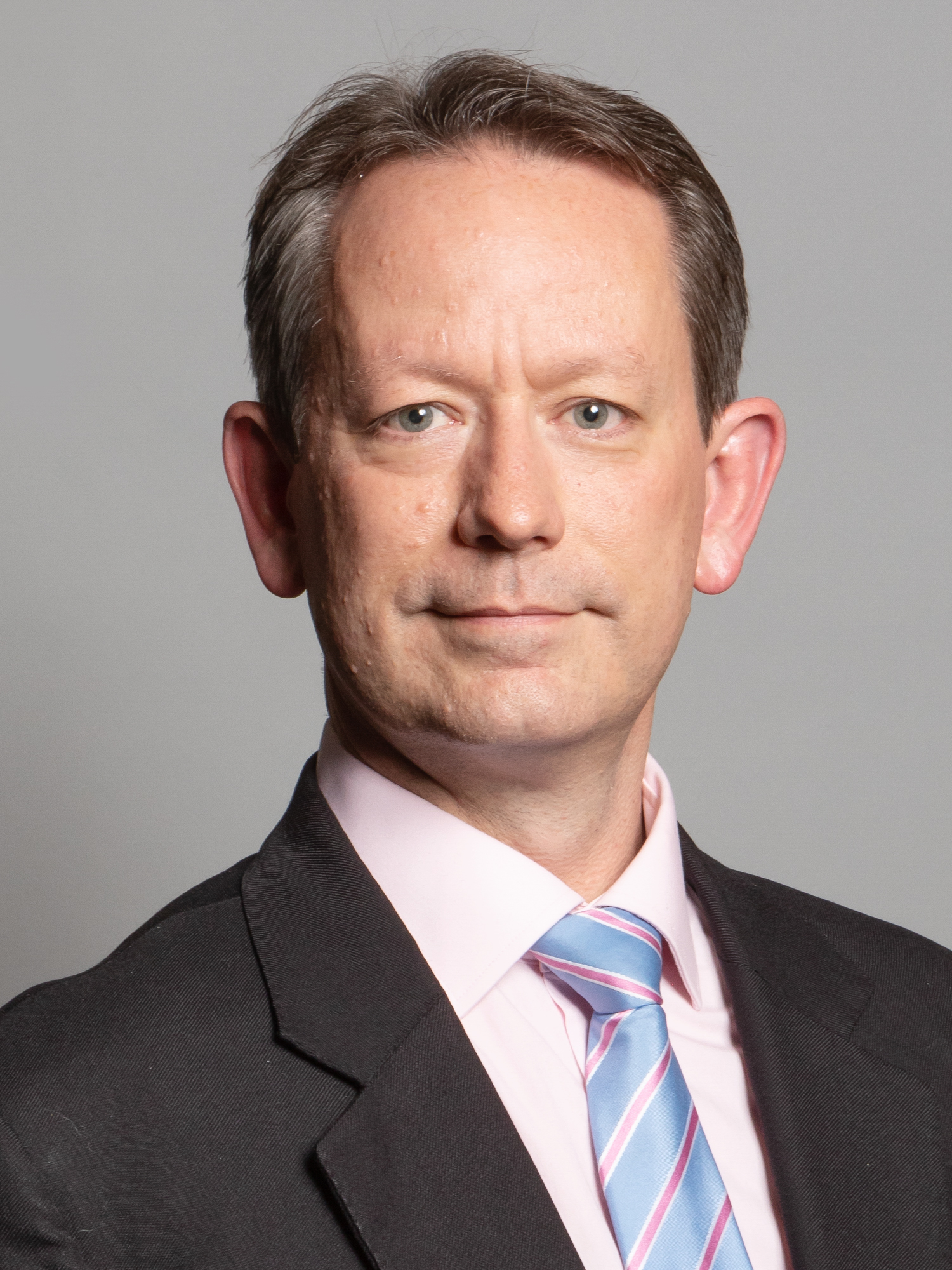
- Official portrait, 2020

Shadow Minister for London
- Incumbent
- Assumed office 19 July 2024
- Leader: Rishi Sunak; Kemi Badenoch

Shadow Minister of State for Housing and Planning
- Incumbent
- Assumed office 22 July 2025
- Leader: Kemi Badenoch

Shadow Secretary of State for Transport
- In office 5 November 2024 – 22 July 2025
- Leader: Kemi Badenoch
- Preceded by: Helen Whately
- Succeeded by: Richard Holden

Parliamentary Under-Secretary of State for Sentencing
- In office 13 November 2023 – 5 July 2024
- Prime Minister: Rishi Sunak
- Preceded by: Edward Argar
- Succeeded by: Nic Dakin

Member of Parliament for Orpington
- Incumbent
- Assumed office 12 December 2019
- Preceded by: Jo Johnson
- Majority: 5,118 (11.1%)

Leader of the Conservative Party in the London Assembly
- In office October 2015 – 17 December 2019
- Preceded by: Andrew Boff
- Succeeded by: Susan Hall

Member of the London Assembly for Bexley and Bromley
- In office 5 May 2016 – 6 May 2021
- Preceded by: James Cleverly
- Succeeded by: Peter Fortune

Member of the London Assembly as an additional member (2008–2012)
- In office 1 May 2008 – 5 May 2016
- Ward: Sidcup West (1998–2002); Longlands (2002–2021)
- Succeeded by: Kemi Badenoch

Councillor for Bexley London Borough Council
- In office 8 May 1998 – 15 March 2021

Personal details
- Born: 7 April 1972 (age 54) British Hong Kong
- Party: Conservative
- Spouse: Cheryl Cooley
- Education: University of Kent
- Website: Official website

Gareth Andrew Bacon (born 7 April 1972) is a British politician who has served as the Member of Parliament (MP) for Orpington since 2019. He was Parliamentary Under-Secretary of State for Sentencing from November 2023 to July 2024. He was Shadow Minister for London from July 2024 to August 2026 and Shadow Transport Secretary between November 2024 and July 2025.

A member of the Conservative Party, he was a member of the London Assembly from 2008 until he stood down in 2021 after his election as an MP.

== Early life and career ==
Bacon was born in Hong Kong in 1972, the son of Robert and Helen Bacon. He studied at St. Mary's and St. Joseph's School in Sidcup, then at the University of Kent at Canterbury, where he was awarded a Bachelor of Arts honours degree in Politics and Government in 1996. This was followed by a Master of Arts degree in European Studies in 1997. He worked as head of the public sector division of Martin Ward Anderson from 2004 to 2012.

== Political career ==
Bacon joined the Conservative Party in 1987. Prior to his election as the Member of Parliament for Orpington, he had a long career in local government, serving as a London Assembly Member since 2008 and as a local councillor since 1998.

Following his election as a Member of Parliament in 2019, Bacon announced that he would stand down from Bexley Council and the London Assembly ahead of the upcoming local elections.

=== Member of the London Assembly ===
Bacon stood for Greenwich and Lewisham on the Greater London Authority in 2004, but was unsuccessful. In the 2008 London Assembly election, he was elected as the third Conservative London-wide Assembly Member.

In 2012, Bacon, who was ranked second on the Conservative Party top-up list, went on to be re-elected to the London Assembly. In June 2010, Bacon was appointed by the Mayor of London, Boris Johnson, to serve on the London Fire & Emergency Planning Authority. He became chairman of the authority in 2015, and held this position until the following year, remaining a member of the authority until 2018.

In September 2015, Bacon was selected to be the Conservative candidate for the London Assembly constituency of Bexley and Bromley. At the following election, he was duly elected to the London Assembly with 87,460 votes (46.1%) and a majority of 41,699. He succeeded James Cleverly, who had been elected to Parliament at the 2015 general election. In October 2015, Bacon succeeded Andrew Boff as the Leader of the GLA Conservative Group at City Hall, a position he held until 2019.

In the London Assembly, Bacon was Chairman of the Assembly Budget and Performance Committee (from 2016 onwards), Chairman of the Budget Monitoring Subcommittee and vice-chairman of the Oversight Committee.

=== Bexley Council ===
Bacon was a long-standing councillor on Bexley Council, representing Sidcup West from 1998 to 2002, and then Longlands ward, centred on the area of the same name, from 2002 to 2021. He was Deputy Mayor of the borough from 2001 to 2002.

After the Conservatives won control of Bexley Council in 2006, Bacon served as the Cabinet Member for the Environment from 2006 to 2014. In 2012, his portfolio was widened to include the Public Realm.

Bacon was elected Deputy Leader of Bexley Council in 2014, a position he left in January 2015 after his appointment to the London Fire & Emergency Planning Authority.

Bacon stood down from Bexley Council on 15 March 2021.

=== Member of Parliament ===
On 8 November 2019, Bacon was selected by Orpington Conservatives to be their candidate for the upcoming general election, after incumbent Jo Johnson, the younger brother of Prime Minister Boris Johnson, chose not to seek re-election.

On 12 December 2019, Bacon was elected as the Member of Parliament for Orpington. Despite a fall in his numerical vote share, Bacon was elected with the highest Conservative vote share in the seat since 1955, winning the seat with 30,882 votes, a majority of 22,378.

Bacon made his maiden speech in Parliament on 5 February 2020. He became a member of the House of Commons Public Accounts Committee on 2 March 2020.

Following an interim report on the connections between colonialism and properties now in the care of the National Trust, including links with historic slavery, Bacon was among the signatories of a letter to The Telegraph in November 2020 from the "Common Sense Group" of Conservative Parliamentarians. The letter accused the National Trust of being "coloured by cultural Marxist dogma, colloquially known as the 'woke agenda'".

Bacon was appointed as a Parliamentary Private Secretary (PPS) for the Department for Work and Pensions in September 2021. On 15 March 2022, he was appointed as PPS to the Minister of State for Brexit Opportunities and Government Efficiency, Jacob Rees-Mogg, within the Cabinet Office. On 7 July 2022, he was appointed as PPS to the Chancellor of the Duchy of Lancaster Kit Malthouse. During 2022, Bacon served as a Parliamentary Private Secretary to Brandon Lewis while Lewis was Lord Chancellor and Secretary of State for Justice.

On 13 November 2023, Bacon was appointed as Parliamentary Under-Secretary of State in the Ministry of Justice by Prime Minister Rishi Sunak.

== Personal life ==
In 2004, he married Cheryl Cooley, a fellow Conservative councillor in Bexley. She has also worked for current Leader of the Opposition Kemi Badenoch. Bacon and his wife have a daughter. He is a former rugby player, a current squash player and a season ticket holder at Manchester United Football Club.

Parliament of the United Kingdom
Preceded by Jo Johnson	Member of Parliament for Orpington; 2019–present	Incumbent
