= Alfred Smithers =

British politician

Sir Alfred Waldron Smithers (4 October 1850 – 22 August 1924) was a British businessman and politician, and a pioneer of the railway industry in England and Canada.

== Biography ==
Smithers was born in Brixton, Surrey. His parents, William Henry Smithers and Emma Turner, married the prior December. His father a Bank of England employee, Alfred was a member of the London Stock Exchange 1873–1909. From the 1820s, clients dealt with stockbrokers, who would direct jobbers to make trades. In 1909, Stock Exchange rules formalized this separation that minimized dishonest trading. Stockbrokers came from higher social standing, whereas jobbers were commoners. By the 1980s, Akroyd & Smithers was one of the five major London jobbing firms. Although Alfred is mentioned as a partner in this firm, an 1879 restructuring of the partnership only mentions a John Smithers.

Alfred was deputy chair of the South Eastern and Chatham Railway for some years, He became a director of the Grand Trunk Railway (GTR) in 1895, making his first trip to Canada the next year to view the railway's operations. In 1903, the board reluctantly approved Charles Melville Hays' westward expansion plans under the auspices of the Grand Trunk Pacific Railway (GTPR). Board chair and president, Charles Rivers Wilson, delegated Alfred as GTPR spokesperson, probably a vice president by this time.

Following as chair 1909–1921, Alfred made the first contribution to the fund for an Anglican church at Smithers, British Columbia, a place named in his honour. Publicly, Alfred blamed World War I for the railway's subsequent financial predicament. He revisited Canada a number of times prior to the bankruptcy of the GTPR and GTR. He described those years when fighting for the company as "11 years of purgatory".

In March 1880 Alfred married Emma Roberta Theobald (1859–1934). Their children were Waldron (1880–1954), Florence (1882–1942), Langley (1884–1955), Hubert (1885–1953), Eva (1886–1973), and Norman (1887–1976). Hubert, BC, a former train station, was named after son Hubert.

One of the stained glass windows in St Katharine's Church, Knockholt, Kent, England, is a memorial to Alfred & Emma Smithers. Knockholt, BC, a former train station, was named after Knockholt, Kent, the location of the family home. Knighted in 1919, Alfred was Coalition Unionist member of parliament for Chislehurst from 1918 to 1922. His son Waldron was later elected to this constituency.

== Footnotes ==
Parliament of the United Kingdom
New constituency	Member of Parliament for Chislehurst; 1918 – 1922	Succeeded by Robert Chancellor Nesbitt
