= Orpington (constituency) =

Parliamentary constituency in the United Kingdom, 1945 onwards

Coordinates: 51.357°N 0.085°E

- Borough constituency for the House of Commons
- Interactive map of boundaries since 2024
- Location within Greater London
- County: Greater London
- Electorate: 71,571 (March 2020)
- Major settlements: Orpington and Farnborough

Current constituency
- Created: 1945
- Member of Parliament: Gareth Bacon (Conservative)
- Seats: One
- Created from: Chislehurst
- During its existence contributed to new seat(s) of: Bromley and Biggin Hill

Orpington is a constituency (Note: A borough constituency (for the purposes of election expenses and type of returning officer).) represented in the House of Commons of the UK Parliament since 2019 by Gareth Bacon, a Conservative. (Note: As with all constituencies, Orpington elects one Member of Parliament (MP) by the first past the post system of election at least every five years.) Created in 1945, it is the largest constituency in Greater London by area, covering the east and south of the London Borough of Bromley.

== Constituency profile ==
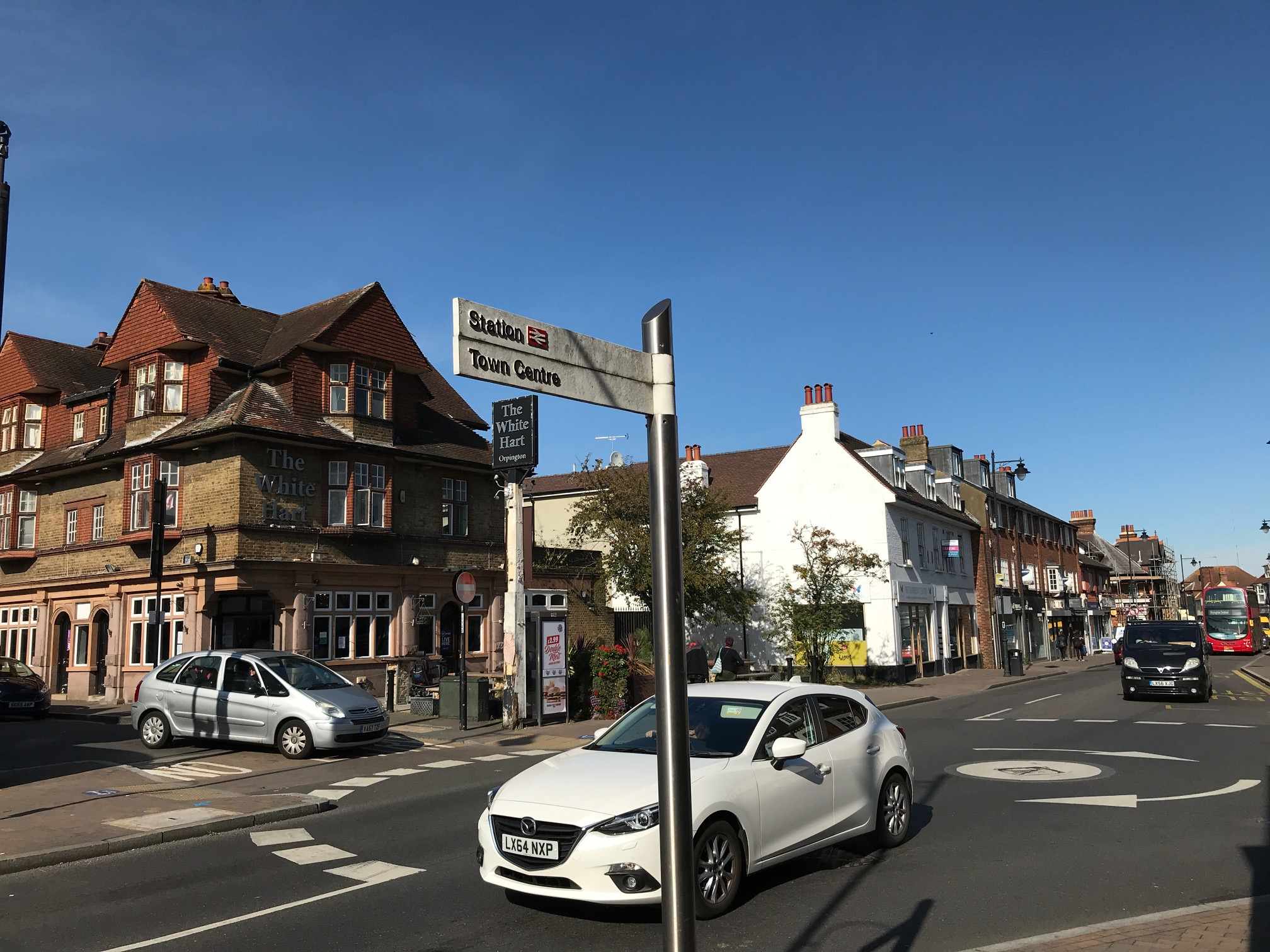
Orpington High Street

Orpington is a constituency in Greater London in England within the Borough of Bromley. It covers the town of Orpington and the small, rural villages to its south.

Orpington is a large, suburban town located around 13 miles (21 km) south-east of central London. It has historic origins and was a rural settlement until the interwar period when much of the suburban development took place. Today, the town is mostly affluent, especially so in its western neighbourhoods like Petts Wood. There is some deprivation in the north and east of the town (St Paul's Cray and St Mary Cray) which contain some post-war council estate development. The constituency is well-connected by rail to Kent and the rest of London, being served by four railway stations. Whilst only making up a tiny proportion of the population today, Orpington traditionally has a Romani community; the town hosted the first World Romani Congress at which the International Romani Union was established. House prices across the constituency are generally lower than the London average but still considerably higher than the UK average.

Orpington has a low proportion of young adults and an above-average population of middle-aged adults with children. Residents have high levels of income and homeownership and the child poverty rate is less than half the UK-wide figure. They have average levels of education and a high proportion work in the health and business administration sectors. The percentage claiming unemployment benefits is below-average. White people made up 78% of the population at the 2021 census. Asians, mostly of Indian origin, were the largest ethnic minority group at 10% and Black people were 6%.

Most of the constituency's representatives at the local borough council are Conservatives, although some Reform UK councillors were elected in St Paul's Cray. An estimated 56% of voters in Orpington supported leaving the European Union in the 2016 referendum, higher than the UK-wide rate of 52%.

== History ==
Orpington was created in a major boundary review enacted at the 1945 general election, which followed an absence of reviews since 1918. The seats of Dartford and Chislehurst had both seen their electorate grow enormously into newly built houses since the 1918 review and were treated as one and reformed into four seats, creating the additional seats of Bexley and this one in 1945.

=== Political history ===
The seat has been won by a Conservative since creation except for the 1962, 1964 and 1966 Liberal Party wins of Eric Lubbock.

The 2015 result made the seat the 43rd safest of the Conservative Party's 331 seats by percentage of majority.

=== Role in the Liberal Party revival ===
The seat is famous for its 1962 by-election when it was taken in a shock result and substantial victory by the Liberal Party candidate Eric Lubbock. He lost the seat in the 1970 general election.

The constituency shared boundaries with the Orpington electoral division for election of councillors to the Greater London Council at elections in 1973, 1977 and 1981.

== Boundaries and boundary changes ==
Dates	Local authority	Maps	Wards
1945–1950	Orpington Urban District; Municipal Borough of Beckenham; Municipal Borough of Bromley		The urban district of Orpington, and part of the municipal boroughs of Beckenham and Bromley.
1950–1955	Orpington Urban District; Dartford Rural District		The urban district of Orpington, and the rural district of Dartford except the parishes of Darenth, Stone, Sutton at Hone, and Wilmington.
1955–1974	Orpington Urban District (before 1965); London Borough of Bromley (after 1965); London Borough of Bexley (after 1965)		The urban district of Orpington.
1974–1983	London Borough of Bromley		Biggin Hill, Chelsfield, Darwin, Farnborough, Goddington, Petts Wood, and St Mary Cray.
1983–1997	London Borough of Bromley		Chelsfield and Goddington, Crofton, Farnborough, Orpington Central, Petts Wood and Knoll, and St Mary Cray.
1997–2010	London Borough of Bromley		Biggin Hill, Chelsfield and Goddington, Crofton, Darwin, Farnborough, Orpington Central, Petts Wood and Knoll, St Mary Cray, and St Paul's Cray.
2010–2024	London Borough of Bromley		Biggin Hill, Chelsfield and Pratts Bottom, Cray Valley East, Darwin, Farnborough and Crofton, Orpington, and Petts Wood and Knoll.
2024–	London Borough of Bromley		Chelsfield, Darwin (except polling district DAR1), Farnborough and Crofton, Orpington, Petts Wood and Knoll, St Mary Cray, St Paul's Cray.

=== Historic ===
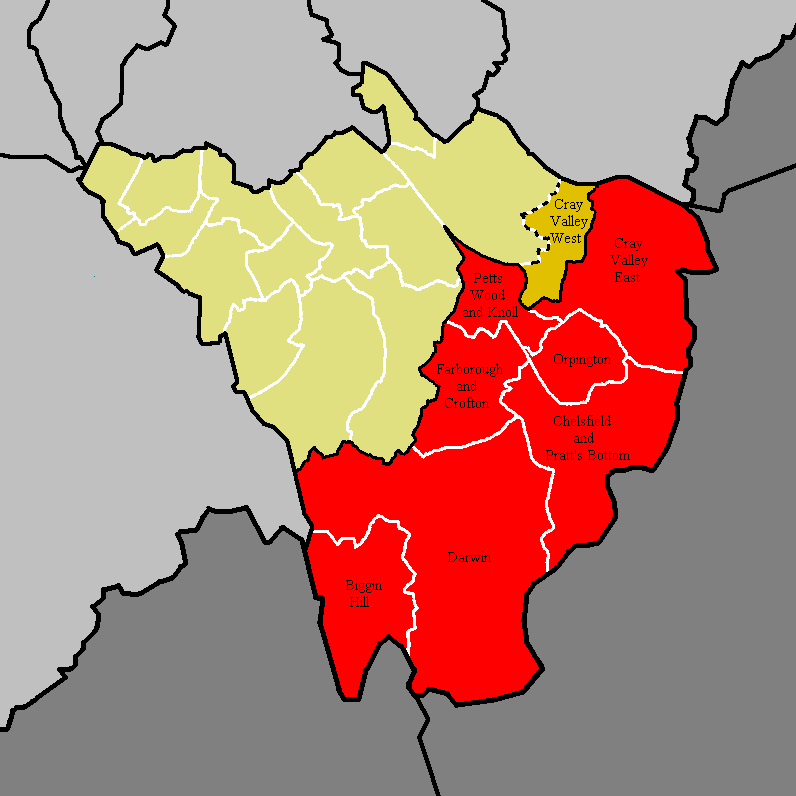
Map showing the wards of the Orpington parliamentary constituency (red) within the London Borough of Bromley (yellow). Cray Valley West (orange) was included in the constituency at the election in 2005 but transferred to Bromley and Chislehurst in 2010.

==== 1945–1950 ====
The constituency was formed entirely from the existing of constituency Chislehurst

==== 1950–1955 ====
The part of the municipal borough of Beckenham included in the seat was transferred to the new constituency of Beckenham, part of the municipal borough of Bromley included in the seat was transferred to the constituency of Bromley while the Dartford Rural District (expect the parishes of Darenth, Stone, Sutton at Hone and Wilmington) was transferred from Chislehurst

==== 1955–1974 ====
The part of the Dartford Rural District included in the seat was transferred to the constituency of Dartford

==== 1974–1983 ====
Knockholt was transferred to the constituency of Sevenoaks

==== 1983–1997 ====
The wards of Biggin Hill and Darwin were transferred to the constituency of Ravensbourne

==== 1997–2010 ====
The wards of Biggin Hill and Darwin were transferred from the abolished constituency of Ravensbourne. The St Paul's Cray ward was transferred from the abolished constituency of Chislehurst

==== 2010–2024 ====
The ward of Cray Valley West was transferred to the constituency of Bromley and Chislehurst

==== Summary ====
The seat has changed a little in subsequent boundary reviews since 1955. For the 1997 general election the Ravensbourne seat which had emerged in the west by Bromley was divided between three constituencies which before then overshot the London Borough of Bromley, adding to Orpington the community of Biggin Hill.

=== Current ===
Further to the 2023 review of Westminster constituencies, which came into effect for the 2024 general election, the constituency was defined as comprising the following wards of the London Borough of Bromley as they existed on 1 December 2020:

- Chelsfield and Pratts Bottom; Cray Valley East; Cray Valley West; Darwin (part^{1}); Farnborough and Crofton; Crockenhill; Well Hill; Hockenden; Orpington; Petts Wood and Knoll.

^{1.}Area marked “4” on the map of the Orpington constituency produced by the Boundary Commission for England

The boundary with Bromley and Chislehurst (renamed Bromley and Biggin Hill) was realigned with Cray Valley West ward being transferred in (thus uniting the two Cray Valley wards), offset by the loss of Biggin Hill.

Following a local government boundary review which came into effect in May 2022, the constituency now comprises the following wards of the London Borough of Bromley from the 2024 general election:

- Chelsfield; Darwin (except polling district DAR1); Farnborough and Crofton; Orpington; Petts Wood and Knoll; St Mary Cray; St Paul's Cray.

== Members of Parliament ==
Election	Member	Party	Notes
1945	Waldron Smithers	Conservative	Member for Chislehurst (1924–1945), Died in December 1954
1955 by-election	Donald Sumner	Conservative	Seat vacated after Sumner accepted an appointment as a County Court judge
1962 by-election	Eric Lubbock	Liberal	Liberal Chief Whip (1963–1970)
1970	Ivor Stanbrook	Conservative	
1992	John Horam	Conservative	Parliamentary Secretary for the Public Service (1995); Under-Secretary of State for Health and Social Security (1995–1997)
2010	Jo Johnson	Conservative	Minister of State at the Cabinet Office (2014–2015); Minister of State for Universities, Science, Research and Innovation (2015–2018, 2019); Minister of State for Transport (2018)
2019	Gareth Bacon	Conservative	Under-Secretary of State for Sentencing (2023–2024); Shadow Secretary of State for Transport (2024–2025) Shadow Minister for London (2024–) Shadow Minister of State for Housing and Planning (2025–)

== Elections ==
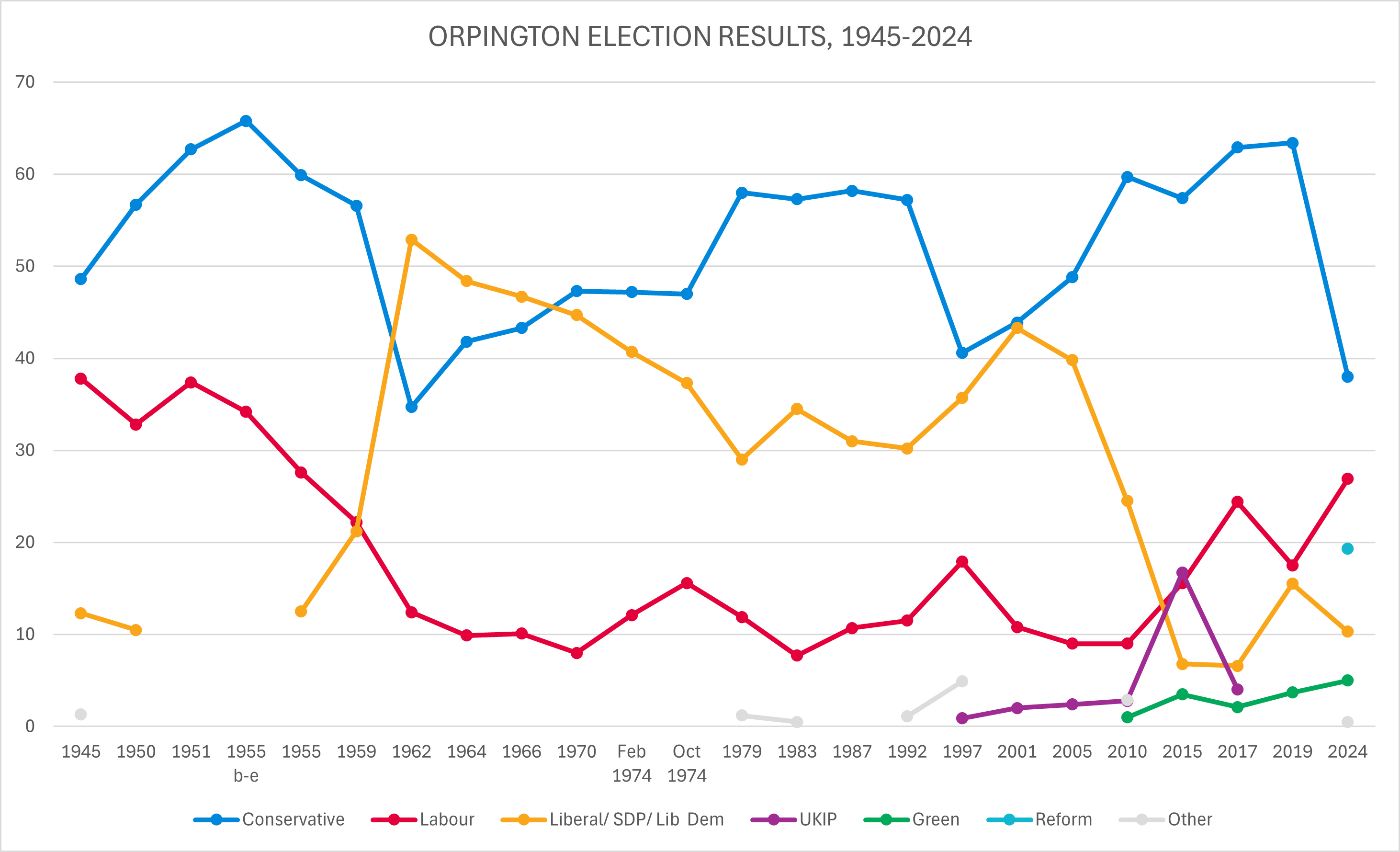
Election results 1945–2024

=== Elections in the 2020s ===
General election 2024: Orpington
Party	Candidate	Votes	%	±%
Conservative	Gareth Bacon	17,504	38.0	−23.9
Labour	Ju Owens	12,386	26.9	+7.1
Reform	Mark James	8,896	19.3	New
Liberal Democrats	Graeme Casey	4,728	10.3	−4.3
Green	Seamus McCauley	2,319	5.0	+1.3
SDP	John Bright	240	0.5	New
Majority		5,118	11.1	−34.8
Turnout		46,073	64.7	−3.7
Registered electors		71,203		
Conservative hold		Swing	−15.5	

=== Elections in the 2010s ===
2019 notional result
Party	Vote	%
Conservative	30,308	61.9
Labour	9,681	19.8
Liberal Democrats	7,145	14.6
Green	1,824	3.7
Turnout	48,958	68.4
Electorate	71,571	

General election 2019: Orpington
Party	Candidate	Votes	%	±%
Conservative	Gareth Bacon	30,882	63.4	+0.5
Labour	Simon Jeal	8,504	17.5	−6.9
Liberal Democrats	Allan Tweddle	7,552	15.5	+8.9
Green	Karen Wheller	1,783	3.7	+1.6
Majority		22,378	45.9	+7.4
Turnout		48,721	70.7	−3.6
Registered electors		68,884		
Conservative hold		Swing	+3.7	

General election 2017: Orpington
Party	Candidate	Votes	%	±%
Conservative	Jo Johnson	31,762	62.9	+5.5
Labour	Nigel de Gruchy	12,309	24.4	+8.8
Liberal Democrats	Alex Feakes	3,315	6.6	−0.2
UKIP	Brian Philp	2,023	4.0	−12.7
Green	Tamara Galloway	1,060	2.1	−1.4
Majority		19,453	38.5	−2.2
Turnout		50,469	74.3	+1.7
Registered electors		67,902		
Conservative hold		Swing	−1.6	

By numerical vote share, the 2017 general election saw Orpington become the safest Conservative seat in London.

General election 2015: Orpington
Party	Candidate	Votes	%	±%
Conservative	Jo Johnson	28,152	57.4	−2.3
UKIP	Idham Ramadi	8,173	16.7	+13.9
Labour	Nigel de Gruchy	7,645	15.6	+6.6
Liberal Democrats	Peter Brooks	3,330	6.8	−17.7
Green	Tamara Galloway	1,732	3.5	+2.5
Majority		19,979	40.7	+5.6
Turnout		49,032	72.6	−0.2
Registered electors		68,129		
Conservative hold		Swing	−8.1	

General election 2010: Orpington
Party	Candidate	Votes	%	±%
Conservative	Jo Johnson	29,200	59.7	+7.2
Liberal Democrats	David McBride	12,000	24.5	−16.1
Labour	Stephen Morgan	4,400	9.0	+3.2
UKIP	Mick Greenhough	1,360	2.8	+1.6
BNP	Tess Culnane	1,241	2.5	New
Green	Tamara Galloway	511	1.0	New
English Democrat	Chris Snape	199	0.4	New
Majority		17,200	35.2	+26.2
Turnout		48,911	72.2	+2.3
Registered electors		67,732		
Conservative hold		Swing	+11.7	

=== Elections in the 2000s ===
2005 notional result
Party	Vote	%
Conservative	24,370	52.5
Liberal Democrats	18,859	40.6
Labour	2,674	5.8
UKIP	559	1.2
Turnout	46,462	69.9
Electorate	66,448	

General election 2005: Orpington
Party	Candidate	Votes	%	±%
Conservative	John Horam	26,718	48.8	+4.9
Liberal Democrats	Chris Maines	21,771	39.8	−3.6
Labour	Emily Bird	4,914	9.0	−1.9
UKIP	Mick Greenhough	1,331	2.4	+0.5
Majority		4,947	9.0	+8.5
Turnout		54,734	70.0	+5.4
Registered electors		78,240		
Conservative hold		Swing	+4.2	

General election 2001: Orpington
Party	Candidate	Votes	%	±%
Conservative	John Horam	22,334	43.9	+3.3
Liberal Democrats	Chris Maines	22,065	43.3	+7.7
Labour	Chris Purnell	5,517	10.8	−7.0
UKIP	John Youles	996	2.0	+1.1
Majority		269	0.5	−4.4
Turnout		50,912	64.6	−11.8
Registered electors		78,853		
Conservative hold		Swing	−2.2	

=== Elections in the 1990s ===
General election 1997: Orpington
Party	Candidate	Votes	%	±%
Conservative	John Horam	24,417	40.6	−14.7
Liberal Democrats	Chris Maines	21,465	35.7	+7.4
Labour	Sue Polydorou	10,753	17.9	+3.1
Referendum	David Clark	2,316	3.8	New
UKIP	James Carver	526	0.9	New
Liberal	Robin Almond	494	0.8	−0.3
ProLife Alliance	Nicholas Wilton	191	0.3	New
Majority		2,952	4.8	−22.1
Turnout		60,162	76.3	−4.8
Registered electors		78,831		
Conservative hold		Swing	−11.0	

1992 notional result
Party	Vote	%
Conservative	36,770	55.3
Liberal Democrats	18,840	28.3
Labour	9,837	14.8
Others	1,085	1.6
Turnout	66,532	81.1
Electorate	82,032	

General election 1992: Orpington
Party	Candidate	Votes	%	±%
Conservative	John Horam	27,421	57.2	−1.0
Liberal Democrats	Chris Maines	14,486	30.2	−0.8
Labour	Stephen Cowan	5,512	11.5	+0.8
Liberal	Robin Almond	539	1.1	New
Majority		12,935	27.0	−0.2
Turnout		47,958	83.7	+5.1
Registered electors		57,318		
Conservative hold		Swing	−0.1	

=== Elections in the 1980s ===
General election 1987: Orpington
Party	Candidate	Votes	%	±%
Conservative	Ivor Stanbrook	27,261	58.2	+1.0
Liberal	Jonathan Fryer	14,529	31.0	−3.5
Labour	Steven Cowan	5,020	10.7	+3.0
Majority		12,732	27.2	+4.5
Turnout		46,810	78.5	+2.6
Registered electors		59,608		
Conservative hold		Swing	+2.2	

General election 1983: Orpington
Party	Candidate	Votes	%	±%
Conservative	Ivor Stanbrook	25,569	57.3	+0.0
Liberal	John Cook	15,418	34.5	+5.2
Labour	David Bean	3,439	7.7	−4.5
BNP	L.T. Taylor	215	0.5	New
Majority		10,151	22.8	−5.2
Turnout		44,641	76.0	−5.7
Registered electors		58,759		
Conservative hold		Swing	−2.6	

=== Elections in the 1970s ===
1979 notional result
Party	Vote	%
Conservative	26,735	57.2
Liberal	13,692	29.3
Labour	5,719	12.2
Others	558	1.2
Turnout	46,704	
Electorate		

General election 1979: Orpington
Party	Candidate	Votes	%	±%
Conservative	Ivor Stanbrook	32,150	58.0	+11.0
Liberal	John Cook	16,074	29.0	−8.4
Labour	Anne Weyman	6,581	11.9	−3.8
National Front	Frank Hitches	516	0.9	New
Homeland Party	Ian MacKillian	146	0.3	New
Majority		16,076	29.0	+19.3
Turnout		55,467	81.7	+2.7
Registered electors		67,917		
Conservative hold		Swing	+9.7	

General election October 1974: Orpington
Party	Candidate	Votes	%	±%
Conservative	Ivor Stanbrook	24,394	47.0	−0.2
Liberal	Kina-Maria Lubbock	19,384	37.3	−3.3
Labour	C. Spillane	8,121	15.6	+3.6
Majority		5,010	9.7	+3.1
Turnout		51,899	79.0	−7.1
Registered electors		65,686		
Conservative hold		Swing	+1.6	

General election February 1974: Orpington
Party	Candidate	Votes	%	±%
Conservative	Ivor Stanbrook	26,435	47.2	−0.1
Liberal	Robin Young	22,771	40.7	−4.0
Labour	David Grant	6,752	12.1	+4.1
Majority		3,664	6.6	+4.0
Turnout		55,598	86.1	+7.0
Registered electors		64,967		
Conservative hold		Swing	+2.0	

1970 notional result
Party	Vote	%
Conservative	23,900	47.3
Liberal	22,600	44.8
Labour	4,000	7.9
Turnout	50,500	78.9
Electorate	64,041	

General election 1970: Orpington
Party	Candidate	Votes	%	±%
Conservative	Ivor Stanbrook	24,385	47.3	+4.0
Liberal	Eric Lubbock	23,063	44.7	−1.9
Labour	David Grant	4,098	8.0	−2.1
Majority		1,322	2.6	N/A
Turnout		51,546	79.1	−7.8
Registered electors		65,191		
Conservative gain from Liberal		Swing	+3.0	

=== Elections in the 1960s ===
General election 1966: Orpington
Party	Candidate	Votes	%	±%
Liberal	Eric Lubbock	22,615	46.7	−1.7
Conservative	Norris McWhirter	20,993	43.3	+1.5
Labour	David Sleigh	4,870	10.0	+0.2
Majority		1,622	3.4	−3.2
Turnout		48,478	86.9	+1.6
Registered electors		55,776		
Liberal hold		Swing	−1.6	

General election 1964: Orpington
Party	Candidate	Votes	%	±%
Liberal	Eric Lubbock	22,637	48.4	+27.2
Conservative	Norris McWhirter	19,565	41.8	−14.8
Labour	Peter Merriton	4,609	9.8	−12.4
Majority		3,072	6.6	N/A
Turnout		46,811	85.3	+2.6
Registered electors		54,846		
Liberal gain from Conservative		Swing	+20.1	

1962 Orpington by-election
Party	Candidate	Votes	%	±%
Liberal	Eric Lubbock	22,846	52.9	+31.7
Conservative	Peter Goldman	14,991	34.7	−21.9
Labour	Alan Jinkinson	5,350	12.4	−9.8
Majority		7,855	18.2	N/A
Turnout		43,187	80.3	−2.5
Registered electors		53,779		
Liberal gain from Conservative		Swing	+26.8	

=== Elections in the 1950s ===
General election 1959: Orpington
Party	Candidate	Votes	%	±%
Conservative	Donald Sumner	24,303	56.6	−3.3
Labour	Norman Hart	9,543	22.2	−5.4
Liberal	Jack Galloway	9,092	21.2	+8.7
Majority		14,760	34.4	+2.1
Turnout		42,938	82.8	+3.3
Registered electors		51,872		
Conservative hold		Swing	+1.1	

General election 1955: Orpington
Party	Candidate	Votes	%
Conservative	Donald Sumner	22,166	59.9
Labour	Norman Hart	10,230	27.6
Liberal	Alfred Howard	4,610	12.5
Majority		11,936	32.3
Turnout		37,006	79.4
Registered electors		46,581	
Conservative win (new boundaries)			

1955 Orpington by-election
Party	Candidate	Votes	%	±%
Conservative	Donald Sumner	20,082	65.8	+3.2
Labour	R. David Vaughan Williams	10,426	34.2	−3.2
Majority		9,656	31.6	+6.3
Turnout		30,508	55.4	−26.6
Registered electors		55,069		
Conservative hold		Swing	+3.2	

General election 1951: Orpington
Party	Candidate	Votes	%	±%
Conservative	Waldron Smithers	27,244	62.7	+6.0
Labour	R. David Vaughan Williams	16,241	37.3	+4.5
Majority		11,003	25.3	+1.4
Turnout		43,485	82.0	−3.1
Registered electors		53,023		
Conservative hold		Swing	+0.7	

General election 1950: Orpington
Party	Candidate	Votes	%	±%
Conservative	Waldron Smithers	24,450	56.7	+8.0
Labour	George Vaughan	14,161	32.8	−5.0
Liberal	Ruth Abrahams	4,523	10.5	−1.8
Majority		10,289	23.9	+13.0
Turnout		43,134	85.1	+12.4
Registered electors		50,704		
Conservative hold		Swing	+6.5	

=== Elections in the 1940s ===
General election 1945: Orpington
Party	Candidate	Votes	%
Conservative	Waldron Smithers	20,388	48.7
Labour	Alan Mais	15,846	37.8
Liberal	Edward Goodfellow	5,140	12.3
Independent	Guy Milner	528	1.3
Majority		4,542	10.8
Turnout		41,902	72.7
Registered electors		57,625	
Conservative win (new seat)			

== See also ==
- List of parliamentary constituencies in London
