= Sylvestra Le Touzel =

British actress (born 1958)

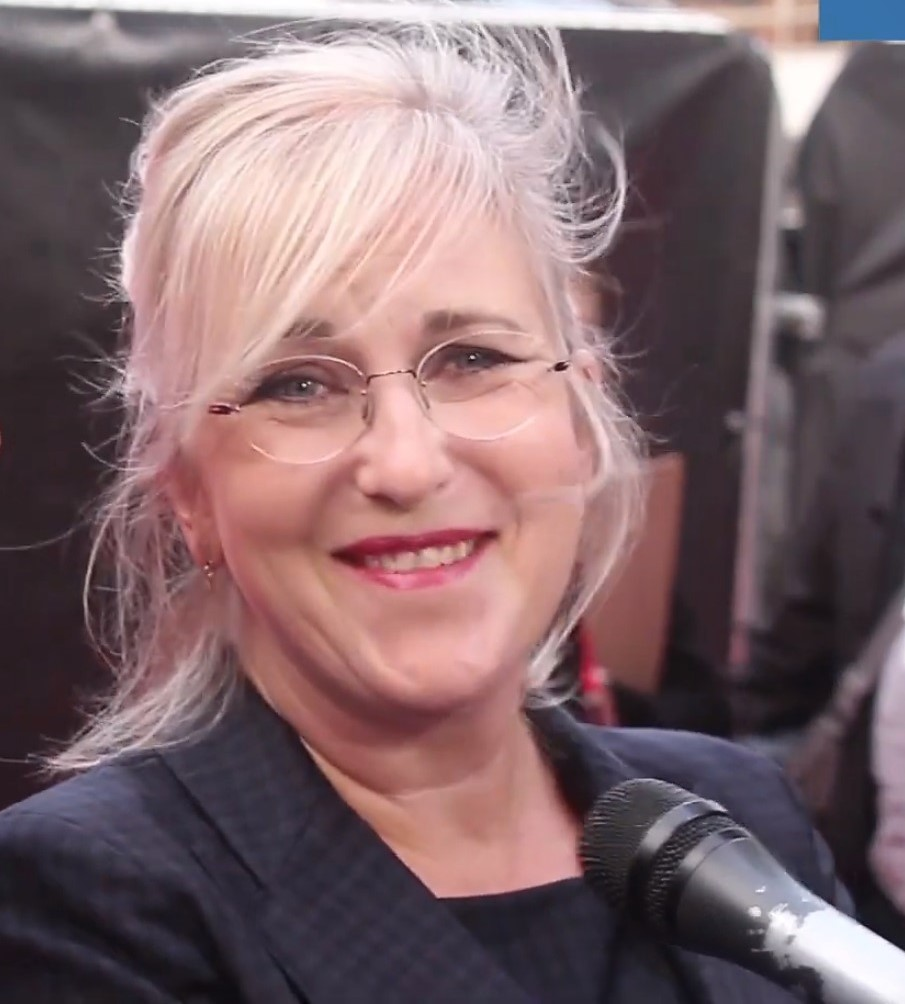
- Le Touzel in 2014
- Born: 20 October 1958 (age 68); Kensington, London, England
- Occupation: Actress
- Years active: 1968–present
- Spouse: Owen Teale (m. 2001)
- Children: 2

Sylvestra Le Touzel (born 20 October 1958) is an English actress. Known for her character work in television, radio, film and theatre, she began her career as a child actor before moving into adult roles. She is married to actor Owen Teale, with whom she has two children.

== Early life ==
The daughter of John Le Touzel and his wife Karin Slater, Le Touzel was born and brought up in Kensington, London. Her family is originally from Jersey in the Channel Islands.

Her younger brother Joshua Le Touzel (1963–2012) also became a child actor, appearing as Kay in The Snow Queen (1976).

== Career ==
=== Television work (1968–present) ===
Le Touzel began her career at the age of ten, playing a child who bedevils the Second Doctor in the 1968 Doctor Who story The Mind Robber. She later starred on the BBC's "Look and Read", appearing as Helen in their 1971 serial The Boy from Space. An early adult role was her portrayal of Fanny Price in the BBC dramatisation of Jane Austen's Mansfield Park (1983). In 1985, Le Touzel co-starred with Bryan Pringle in a television advertisement for Heineken. A parody of the "Rain in Spain" scene from My Fair Lady, it saw Pringle's character teaching a posh woman (Le Touzel) how to speak cockney by repeating: "The wa'er in Major'a don' taste like wot id ough' 'a" ("The water in Majorca don't taste like what it ought to"). The advert subsequently placed at number 29 on Channel 4's rundown of the "100 Greatest TV Ads".

Le Touzel appeared in various television productions throughout the 1990s, including the police procedural Between the Lines (1994), an adaptation of Catherine Cookson's The Gambling Man (1995), and the science fiction miniseries The Uninvited (1997). She went on to star as veterinarian Briony on the BBC One sitcom Beast (2000–2001), which ran for two series. Later credits included prominent roles in the Victoria Wood television film Housewife, 49 (2004), political drama series The Amazing Mrs Pritchard (2006), an adaptation of Jane Austen's Northanger Abbey (2007), the ITV comedy-drama series Bonkers (2007), the BBC Four film Margaret Thatcher: The Long Walk to Finchley (2008)—in which she portrayed Conservative politician Patricia Hornsby-Smith—and the four-part ITV/ABC miniseries Titanic (2012), where she played Lady Duff-Gordon, a survivor of the sinking of the Titanic. In addition, her work as D.C. Hazel Savage in the two-part television film Appropriate Adult (2011), a dramatisation of the crimes of Fred and Rose West, was described as "very authentic" by Variety and "remarkable" by the Los Angeles Times.

In 2017, Le Touzel appeared on the second season of Netflix's historical drama series The Crown, with The Telegraph describing her portrayal of Lady Dorothy Macmillan as "magnificent". Between 2020 and 2023, she appeared as Christine Cranfield, a GCHQ boss, on the Sky One sitcom Intelligence. While the series was met with mixed reviews, Le Touzel's work as the tightly-wound Cranfield was praised, with Collider commenting that she played the part to "perfection".

=== Film work (2006–present) ===
After appearing in several short films, Le Touzel made her feature film debut in Michael Apted's Amazing Grace, a 2006 biographical drama about the abolition of the slave trade in 18th century England. She then co-starred as Heather in Happy-Go-Lucky (2008), a partially improvised comedy-drama directed by Mike Leigh, which The Hollywood Reporter called a "certified good time" with "wonderful performances from top to bottom".

Following a small part in The Iron Lady (2011), Le Touzel played three different characters in Cloud Atlas (2012), a big-budget science fiction drama directed by the Wachowskis. Her next film roles were in Mr. Turner (2014)—a drama based on the life of J. M. W. Turner—and the 2017 political satire The Death of Stalin, where she portrayed Nina Khrushchev, the second wife of Soviet leader Nikita Khrushchev.

== Personal life ==
Le Touzel married the Welsh actor Owen Teale in 2001, several years after they met during a production of Henry IV; the couple have two daughters. Le Touzel is a supporter of charitable theatre and is a patron of Montage Theatre Arts, a performing arts charity based in London, along with fellow actresses Debby Bishop and Emma Thompson.

== Filmography ==
=== Film ===
Year	Title	Role	Notes
2006	Amazing Grace	Marianne Thornton	
2008	Happy-Go-Lucky	Heather	
2011	The Iron Lady	Hostess 1949	
2012	Cloud Atlas	Haskell Moore's Dinner Guest 5 / Nurse Judd / Aide in Slaughtership	
2014	Mr. Turner	Ruskin's Mother	
2017	The Death of Stalin	Nina Khrushchev	

=== Television ===
Year	Title	Role	Notes
1968	Doctor Who	Child	2 episodes
1968	Dixon of Dock Green	Janet Dean	1 episode
1971	Look and Read	Helen	Main cast, series 3
1975	My Honourable Mrs	Sarah	Main cast, 7 episodes
1976	Westway	Samantha Ryder	Main cast, 7 episodes
1977	This Year Next Year	Carol Shaw	9 episodes
1977	Rooms	Denise	3 episodes
1977	Scene	Liza Hollander	2 episodes
1978	Donal and Sally	Sally	Episode of Play for Today series
1979	Crown Court	Beryl Betts	3 episodes
1980	The Professionals	Patricia Buchanan	1 episode
1980	Maria Marten	Emily Corder	Miniseries, 3 episodes
1981	Metal Mickey	Jennifer	1 episode
1981	The Gentle Touch	Debbie Richard	1 episode
1982	Crimes	Jane	Episode of Play for Tomorrow series
1983	Mansfield Park	Fanny Price	Miniseries, 6 episodes
1985	Everyman	Julia	1 episode
1986–1997	Alas Smith and Jones	Various	5 episodes
1987	Screen Two	Finn McQuillen	1 episode
1987	The Short and Curlies	Joy	Television film
1988	Jackanory	Storyteller	5 episodes
1988	The Ray Bradbury Theater	Emily	1 episode
1988	A Vote for Hitler	Marian	Television film
1989	A Fine Romance	Eve Barrington	1 episode
1989	Making Out	Tamsin	1 episode
1989	The Dog It Was That Died	Suleika	Television film
1989–1991	ScreenPlay	Lisbeth / Judith	2 episodes
1991	Lovejoy	Amanda Peagram	1 episode
1993	Fighting for Gemma	Sarah Downes	Television film
1994	Shakespeare: The Animated Tales	Rosalind	Voice, 1 episode
1994	Harry Enfield & Chums	Lady Sophie Dim-But-Royal	1 episode
1994	Between the Lines	Sarah Teale	7 episodes
1995	The Gambling Man	Charlotte Kean	Miniseries, 3 episodes
1997	The Uninvited	Joanna Ball	Miniseries, 4 episodes
1998	Kiss Me Kate	Hillary	1 episode
1998	Vanity Fair	Lady Jane Crawley	3 episodes
2000–2001	Beast	Briony	Main cast, 12 episodes
2000–2001	Hearts and Bones	Rachel Heath	2 episodes
2000–2010	Midsomer Murders	Linda Marquis / Miriam Fielding	2 episodes
2002	Great Britons	Clemmie	Voice, 1 episode
2002	Animated Tales of the World	Gretta / Sun	Voice, 1 episode
2003	My Family	Joanna	Episode: "Blind Justice"
2004	Silent Witness	Amanda Birley	Episode: "Nowhere Fast"
2005	Housewife, 49	Mrs Lynch	Television film
2005	Judge John Deed	Dr Margot Lipton	Episode: "In Defence of Others"
2005	The Inspector Lynley Mysteries	Paula Marshall	Episode: "In Divine Proportion"
2005	Falling	Anna Blackstone	Television film
2006	The Good Housekeeping Guide	Helen	Television film
2006	The Amazing Mrs Pritchard	Nina Morgan	4 episodes
2007	Bonkers	Harriet Waterhouse	Main cast, 6 episodes
2007	Northanger Abbey	Mrs Allen	Television film
2008	The Long Walk to Finchley	Patricia Hornsby-Smith	Television film
2009	Doc Martin	Juliet Wenn	Episode: "The Departed"
2009	May Contain Nuts	Mrs. Reynolds	Television film
2009	Victoria Wood's Mid Life Christmas	Mrs. Godchild / Lolly Goggins	Television special
2010	Accidental Farmer	Judith	Television film
2011	Appropriate Adult	D.C. Hazel Savage	Television film
2011	Lewis	Caroline Eagleton	Episode: "The Mind Has Mountains"
2011	Case Histories	Sylvia Land	2 episodes
2011	New Tricks	Janice Pargetter	1 episode
2011	Threesome	Antonia	Episode: "Builder"
2012	Dirk Gently	Emelda Ransome	1 episode
2012	Titanic	Lady Duff-Gordon	Miniseries, 4 episodes
2012	Secret State	Ros Yelland	Miniseries, 4 episodes
2012	The Thick of It	Mary Drake	2 episodes
2012	Parade's End	Marchant	3 episodes
2013	Blandings	Veronica Shoonmaker	Episode: "The Go Getter"
2013	The Politician's Husband	Diane	Miniseries, 3 episodes
2014	Father Brown	Verity Penhallick	Episode: "The Mysteries of the Rosary"
2014	Utopia	Leah	5 episodes
2014	Big School	Ms Steele	Episode: "OFSTED Chemistry"
2015	Death in Paradise	Sandra Kendrick	Episode: "She Was Murdered Twice"
2017	Endeavour	Mrs Joy Pettybon	Episode: "Canticle"
2017–2018	The Crown	Lady Dorothy Macmillan	4 episodes
2020	The English Game	Lady Kinnaird	4 episodes
2020	Roadkill	Dame Vanessa Pollard	3 episodes
2020–2023	Intelligence	Christine Cranfield	Main cast, 13 episodes
2022	Sister Boniface Mysteries	Prunella Gladwell	Episode: "Queen of the Kitchen"
2023	Dalgliesh	Muriel Godby	2 episodes
2023	The Great	Witch	Episode: "The Bullet or the Bear"
2023	Still Up	Dr. Stafford	Episode: "The Sleep Clinic"

=== Radio ===
Year	Title	Role	Notes
1990	The New Marina	Jean	BBC Radio 4
1995	Faro's Daughter	Deborah Grantham	BBC Radio 4
1995	An Imaginative Experience	Julia	BBC Radio 4
1996	Dombey and Son	Edith	BBC Radio 4
1999	A Midsummer Night's Dream	Titania	BBC Radio 3
2003	Nought Happens Twice Thus	Florence	BBC Radio 4
2008–2009	Daunt and Dervish	Susan Dervish	Main cast, 10 episodes
2013	Votes for Women!	Lady John	BBC Radio 3
2016	Ed Reardon's Week	Antonia	4 episodes
2018	Indigo Children	Ivy	BBC Radio 4
2021	The Archers	Evangeline	1 episode

== Theatre ==
Selected credits
Year	Title	Role	Notes
1982	The Understanding	Kate	Strand Theatre, West End
1984	Fall	Ann	Hampstead Theatre
1985	The Alchemist	Dol Common	Lyric Theatre, West End
1986	Dracula, or Out for the Count	Mina Seward	Lyric Theatre, West End
1988	Hamlet	Ophelia	Theatre Royal
1991	Twelfth Night	Viola	Royal Shakespeare Theatre
1991–1992	Henry IV, Parts I & II	Lady Percy	Barbican Theatre
1992–1993	Artists and Admirers	Negina	Barbican Theatre
1993–1995	An Inspector Calls	Sheila Birling	Aldwych Theatre, West End
1996	Les Enfants du Paradis	Nathalie	Barbican Theatre
1996–1997	A Midsummer Night's Dream	Hermia	Almeida Theatre
2002	Benefactors	Jane	Albery Theatre, West End
2005	Wild East	Dr Pitt	Royal Court Theatre, West End
2010	Les Parents Terribles	Leo	Trafalgar Studios, West End
2012–2013	The Merry Wives of Windsor	Meg Page	Royal Shakespeare Theatre
2015	The Audience	Margaret Thatcher	Apollo Theatre, West End
2015–2016	Waste	Frances Trebell	Royal National Theatre
2018	The Prime of Miss Jean Brodie	Miss Mackay	Donmar Warehouse
2019	Alys, Always	Mary	Bridge Theatre
2023	Pygmalion	Mrs Higgins	The Old Vic
2026	The Authenticator	Fenella	Dorfman Theatre
