= Lyulph Lubbock, 5th Baron Avebury =

English peer

The Right Honourable The Lord Avebury
- 5th Baron Avebury
- Predecessor: Eric Lubbock, 4th Baron Avebury
- Born: 15 June 1954 (age 72)
- Spouse: Susan Carol MacDonald
- Issue: Alexander Lubbock; Vanessa Lubbock
- Heir: Alexander Lubbock
- Parents: Eric Lubbock, 4th Baron Avebury; Kina-Maria O'Kelly

Lyulph Ambrose Jonathan Lubbock, 5th Baron Avebury (born 15 June 1954), is a British hereditary peer. He is the first son of the 4th Lord Avebury and Kina-Maria O'Kelly. He succeeded to the title of Baron Avebury upon his father's death on 14 February 2016.

Lord Avebury married Susan MacDonald in 1977, with whom he has two children, Vanessa Adelaide Felicity Lubbock (born 15 April 1983) and Alexander Lyulph Robert Lubbock (born 17 January 1985), his heir apparent.

Peerage of the United Kingdom
Preceded by Eric Lubbock	Baron Avebury; 2016–present	Incumbent; Heir apparent: Hon. Alexander Lubbock
Baronetage of the United Kingdom
Preceded by Eric Lubbock	Lubbock baronets of Lamas; 2016–present	Incumbent; Heir apparent: Hon. Alexander Lubbock
