= Roger Sims =

British politician (born 1930)

Member of Parliament for Chislehurst
- In office 1974–1997

Personal details
- Born: 27 January 1930 (age 96)
- Party: Conservative
- Spouse: Angela Mathews (m. 1957; died 2015)
- Children: 3

Sir Roger Edward Sims JP (born 27 January 1930) is a British Conservative Party politician.

== Early life and education ==
Sims was the son of Herbert William Sims and Annie Amy Savidge. He was educated at City Boys' Grammar School in Leicester, and St Olave's Grammar School in London.

== Political career ==
Sims fought Shoreditch and Finsbury at the 1966 and 1970 general elections. He was MP for Chislehurst between February 1974 and May 1997, when he retired.

He was Parliamentary Private Secretary to William Whitelaw during Margaret Thatcher's government.

== Outside Parliament ==
Between 1960 and 1972, Sims was a justice of the peace in Bromley. He was deputy chairman from 1970 to 1972, and Chairman of the Juvenile Panel from 1971 to 1972.

== Honours ==
Sims was knighted in 1996.

== Personal life ==
In 1957, Sims married Angela Mathews; the couple had two sons and a daughter. His wife died in 2015.

He lives in Petts Wood, Bromley; his recreations are swimming and music, especially singing. He was a member of the Royal Choral Society from 1950 to 2008.

Parliament of the United Kingdom
Preceded by Patricia Hornsby-Smith	Member of Parliament for Chislehurst; February 1974 – 1997	Constituency abolished (see Bromley and Chislehurst)
