= The Conservation Society =

British conservation organisation

The Conservation Society was an early British environmental organisation founded by Douglas M. C. MacEwan in 1966, in response to what were seen to be fundamental ecological constraints on continued economic growth and population growth in the UK.

The Society received particular press attention in November 1969 for its submission to the House of Commons Select Committee on Science and Technology of a paper entitled Why Britain Needs a Population Policy.

The Society was directed by John Davoll from 1970 until its winding-up in 1987.

The Society published, in association with Volturna Press, in 1968 and 1969, three compilations of articles sympathetic to its aims as 'Conservation Society Reprints' Volumes I, II and 3. This was succeeded by 'Conservation Topics' with original material.

== See also ==
- "The Village Green Preservation Society"
