= 1962 Orpington by-election =

1962 by-election in Orpington constituency

- 14 March 1962

Orpington constituency
- Registered: 53,779
- Turnout: 43,187; 80.3% (▼2.5 pp)
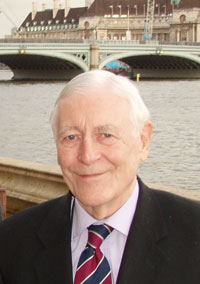
		Con	Lab
Candidate	Eric Lubbock	Peter Goldman	Alan Jinkinson
Party	Liberal	Conservative	Labour
Popular vote	22,846	14,991	5,350
Percentage	52.9%	34.7%	12.4%
Swing	▲31.7	▼21.9	▼9.8
MP before election
Donald Sumner
Conservative
Elected MP
Eric Lubbock
Liberal

The 1962 Orpington by-election was held on 14 March 1962 to elect a Member of Parliament for the constituency of Orpington in south east London. The by-election resulted in the Liberal Party gaining the seat from the Conservative Party with a 31-point swing, and is often described as the start of the revival of the Liberal Party.

== Background ==
The by-election was caused by the appointment of Donald Sumner, the Conservative Member of Parliament for Orpington, as a county court judge. The appointment was generally thought to be making way for Peter Goldman, who had worked with Iain Macleod on the Conservatives' previous election manifesto. The Conservatives had held the seat since its creation in 1945 and, in the 1959 general election, had easily retained it. Labour and the Liberals had each picked up just over 20% of the vote. Commentators therefore expected Goldman to achieve a comfortable victory.

The Liberal Party had reached its lowest ebb in the 1951 general election, gaining only 2.5% of the national vote and returning only six MPs. Signs of a revival were not seen until it won the 1958 Torrington by-election, its first gain at a by-election since Holland with Boston in 1929. The following year, however, Torrington was lost at the general election and, despite increasing its share of the vote to 5.9%, the party did not return more than six MPs. After the general election, its revival resumed as it took second place in several by-elections.

The Liberals had planned to put forward their candidate from the 1959 election, Jack Galloway, but selected local councillor Eric Lubbock after it was revealed that Galloway had technically been guilty of bigamy.

== Campaign ==
During the campaign, Goldman attracted criticism for living outside the constituency and admitting that he had no plans to move into it. His close association with the Exchequer also meant his standing was damaged when the Conservative government was forced to announce a pay freeze (Selwyn Lloyd's "Pay Pause") for public sector workers that was seen, in particular, to penalise nurses.

The Liberals campaigned as a protest vote against the unpopular local government reorganisation by the Conservative government.

The by-election was held on 14 March 1962. Despite the Conservatives' troubles, the near-22% swing from them to the Liberals surprised most analysts. Lubbock won a 7,855-vote majority and held the seat until 1970.

== Impact ==
The Orpington win immediately boosted the Liberals' poll ratings, rising from 16% up to 26% in the Gallup Poll. At the borough council elections held eight weeks afterwards, the Liberals won 454 seats in England and Wales, by far their highest score in the 24 years 1949–1972; and their second-highest score was 255 in May 1963, as the Orpington result continued to reverberate.

Michael Meadowcroft, the Liberal Party's Local Government Officer between 1962 and 1967, wrote of a long-held idea for PhD research: "what happened to the Liberal councillors elected in May 1962 in the aftermath of the Orpington by-election victory. All over the country, out of nowhere, Liberal candidates found themselves elected."

Unlike Torrington in 1958, this was a victory by a large margin, and was not in a previously Liberal-supporting region. There was much talk of "Orpington man", described by York Membery in his 2021 doctoral thesis as "the semi-mythical figure conjured up by the press at the time to help explain this unlikely suburban revolt against a governing party which had long considered the constituency on the fringes of London a safe seat."

However, the Liberals were not able to replicate the Orpington victory in the subsequent by-elections of the 1959–1964 parliament.

== Result ==
Orpington by-election, 1962
Party	Candidate	Votes	%	±%
Liberal	Eric Lubbock	22,846	52.9	+31.7
Conservative	Peter Goldman	14,991	34.7	−21.9
Labour	Alan Jinkinson	5,350	12.4	−9.8
Majority		7,855	18.2	N/A
Turnout		43,187	80.3	−2.5
Registered electors		53,779		
Liberal gain from Conservative		Swing	+26.3	

== Previous result ==
General election 1959: Orpington
Party	Candidate	Votes	%	±%
Conservative	Donald Sumner	24,303	56.6	−3.3
Labour	Norman John Hart	9,543	22.2	−5.4
Liberal	Jack Omar Galloway	9,092	21.2	+8.7
Majority		14,760	34.4	+1.1
Turnout		42,938	82.8	+3.4
Registered electors		51,872		
Conservative hold		Swing	+0.6	
