= Chislehurst (constituency) =

Parliamentary constituency in the United Kingdom, 1918–1997

- Former county constituency for the House of Commons
- Boundary of Chislehurst in Greater London for the 1983 general election
- County: Kent (pre-1965); Greater London (post-1965)

1918–1997
- Created from: Sevenoaks
- Replaced by: Bromley and Chislehurst (bulk); Orpington (part)
- During its existence contributed to new seat(s) of: Orpington (1945); Sidcup (1974)

Chislehurst was a parliamentary constituency in what is now the London Borough of Bromley. It returned one Member of Parliament (MP) to the House of Commons of the UK Parliament.

The constituency was created for the 1918 general election, and abolished for the 1997 general election, when it was partly replaced by the new Bromley and Chislehurst constituency. From 1885 to 1918, most of the area of this constituency was included in the Sevenoaks seat.

== Boundaries and boundary changes ==
Dates	Local authority	Maps	Wards
1918–1945	Chislehurst Urban District (before 1934); Sidcup Urban District (before 1934); Bromley Rural District (before 1934); Chislehurst and Sidcup Urban District (after 1934); Orpington Urban District (after 1934); Municipal Borough of Bromley (after 1934)		The Urban Districts of Chislehurst and Foot's Cray, the Rural District of Bromley, and part of the Rural District of Dartford.
1945–1950	Chislehurst and Sidcup Urban District; Swanscombe Urban District; Dartford Rural District		The Urban Districts of Chislehurst and Sidcup, and Swanscombe, and the Rural District of Dartford.
1950–1955	Chislehurst and Sidcup Urban District; Dartford Rural District		The Urban District of Chislehurst and Sidcup, and the parishes of Darenth, Stone, Sutton at Hone, and Wilmington in the Rural District of Dartford.
1955–1974	Chislehurst and Sidcup Urban District (before 1965); London Borough of Bromley (after 1965); London Borough of Bexley (after 1965)		The Urban District of Chislehurst and Sidcup.
1974–1997	London Borough of Bromley		Bickley, Chislehurst, Mottingham, Plaistow and Sundridge, and St Paul's Cray.

=== 1918–1945 ===
The constituency was formed primarily from the existing constituency of Sevenoaks

=== 1945–1950 ===
The Orpington Urban District and the part of the Municipal Borough of Bromley included in the seat were transferred to the new constituency of Orpington. The Swanscombe Urban District and the rest of the Dartford Rural District were transferred from the constituency of Dartford

=== 1950–1955 ===
The constituency was subject to minor boundary changes, which saw Swanscombe transferred to the constituency of Gravesend while the Dartford Rural District (except the parishes of Darenth, Stone, Sutton at Hone and Wilmington) was transferred to Orpington

=== 1955–1974 ===
The part of the Dartford Rural District included in the seat was transferred to Dartford

=== 1974–1997 ===
The part of the London Borough of Bexley included in the seat was transferred to new constituency of Sidcup

=== Abolition ===
After the Fourth periodic review of Westminster constituencies the majority of the constituency was merged with the eastern part of the to be abolished Ravensbourne constituency to form the new seat of Bromley and Chislehurst, with the St Paul's Cray ward transferred to Orpington.

== Members of Parliament ==
Election	Member	Party	Notes
1918	Alfred Smithers	Unionist	
1922	Robert Nesbitt	Unionist	
1924	Waldron Smithers	Conservative	Contested Orpington following redistribution
Constituency split, with half becoming the new Orpington seat
1945	George Wallace	Labour	
1950	Patricia Hornsby-Smith	Conservative	
1966	Alistair Macdonald	Labour	
1970	Patricia Hornsby-Smith	Conservative	Contested Aldridge-Brownhills following redistribution
Constituency split, majority renamed Sidcup, minority merged with part of the abolished Bromley
Feb 1974	Roger Sims	Conservative	
1997	constituency abolished: see Bromley and Chislehurst & Orpington		

== Elections ==
=== Elections in the 1990s ===
General election 1992: Chislehurst
Party	Candidate	Votes	%	±%
Conservative	Roger Sims	24,761	58.4	+0.7
Labour	R. Ian Wingfield	9,485	22.4	+3.0
Liberal Democrats	T. William M. Hawthorne	6,683	15.8	−7.3
Liberal	I Richmond	849	2.0	New
Green	Frances Speed	652	1.5	New
Majority		15,276	36.0	+1.4
Turnout		42,430	78.9	+3.4
Registered electors		53,782		
Conservative hold		Swing	−1.1	

=== Elections in the 1980s ===
General election 1987: Chislehurst
Party	Candidate	Votes	%	±%
Conservative	Roger Sims	24,165	57.6	+1.9
Liberal	Richard Younger-Ross	9,658	23.0	–2.3
Labour	Selwyn Ward	8,115	19.4	+0.9
Majority		14,507	34.6	+4.2
Turnout		41,938	75.5	+2.8
Registered electors		55,535		
Conservative hold		Swing	+2.1	

General election 1983: Chislehurst
Party	Candidate	Votes	%	±%
Conservative	Roger Sims	22,108	55.7	+1.2
Liberal	Philip Lingard	10,047	25.3	+12.8
Labour	Alistair Macdonald	7,320	18.4	–13.2
BNP	Alfred Waite	201	0.5	New
Majority		12,061	30.4	+7.5
Turnout		39,676	72.7	–6.2
Registered electors		54,567		
Conservative hold		Swing	–5.8	

=== Elections in the 1970s ===
General election 1979: Chislehurst
Party	Candidate	Votes	%	±%
Conservative	Roger Sims	23,259	54.5	+8.2
Labour	Christopher Howes	13,494	31.6	–5.2
Liberal	Brian Taylor	5,335	12.5	–4.4
National Front	Raymond Hoy	564	1.3	New
Majority		9,765	22.9	+13.4
Turnout		42,652	79.0	+2.9
Registered electors		54,024		
Conservative hold		Swing	+6.7	

General election October 1974: Chislehurst
Party	Candidate	Votes	%	±%
Conservative	Roger Sims	18,926	46.3	+0.4
Labour	Alistair Macdonald	15,032	36.8	+3.1
Liberal	John Crowley	6,900	16.9	–3.5
Majority		3,894	9.5	–2.7
Turnout		40,858	76.1	–8.3
Registered electors		53,699		
Conservative hold		Swing	–1.36	

General election February 1974: Chislehurst
Party	Candidate	Votes	%	±%
Conservative	Roger Sims	20,595	45.9	–4.2
Labour	Alistair Macdonald	15,102	33.7	–6.1
Liberal	Robert Webster	9,127	20.4	+10.3
Majority		5,493	12.3	+1.9
Turnout		44,824	84.4	+11.4
Registered electors		53,137		
Conservative hold		Swing	+1.0	

1970 notional result
Party	Vote	%
Conservative	19,900	50.1
Labour	15,800	39.8
Liberal	4,000	10.1
Turnout	39,700	72.9
Electorate	54,450	

General election 1970: Chislehurst
Party	Candidate	Votes	%	±%
Conservative	Patricia Hornsby-Smith	24,650	49.1	+5.6
Labour	Alistair Macdonald	21,287	42.4	–2.7
Liberal	Ron Coverson	4,268	8.5	–2.9
Majority		3,363	6.7	N/A
Turnout		50,205	75.5	–8.7
Registered electors		66,483		
Conservative gain from Labour		Swing	+4.2	

=== Elections in the 1960s ===
General election 1966: Chislehurst
Party	Candidate	Votes	%	±%
Labour	Alistair Macdonald	22,757	45.1	+3.9
Conservative	Patricia Hornsby-Smith	21,947	43.5	–0.8
Liberal	Paul Hayden	5,761	11.4	–3.1
Majority		810	1.6	N/A
Turnout		50,465	84.3	+1.4
Registered electors		59,895		
Labour gain from Conservative		Swing	+2.3	

General election 1964: Chislehurst
Party	Candidate	Votes	%	±%
Conservative	Patricia Hornsby-Smith	22,251	44.3	–6.0
Labour	Ronald Huzzard	20,736	41.2	+4.0
Liberal	Sheilagh Hobday	7,291	14.5	+2.1
Majority		1,515	3.0	–10.0
Turnout		50,278	82.9	–3.0
Registered electors		60,678		
Conservative hold		Swing	–5.0	

=== Elections in the 1950s ===
General election 1959: Chislehurst
Party	Candidate	Votes	%	±%
Conservative	Patricia Hornsby-Smith	25,748	50.3	+0.6
Labour	Margaret Reid	19,069	37.3	–4.6
Liberal	David Blackburn	6,366	12.4	+4.1
Majority		6,679	13.0	+5.2
Turnout		51,183	85.8	+0.9
Registered electors		59,646		
Conservative hold		Swing	+2.6	

General election 1955: Chislehurst
Party	Candidate	Votes	%
Conservative	Patricia Hornsby-Smith	24,514	49.7
Labour	George Wallace	20,644	41.9
Liberal	David Blackburn	4,120	8.4
Majority		3,870	7.9
Turnout		49,278	84.9
Registered electors		58,063	
Conservative win (new boundaries)			

General election 1951: Chislehurst
Party	Candidate	Votes	%	±%
Conservative	Patricia Hornsby-Smith	31,679	50.8	+6.0
Labour	George Wallace	30,699	49.2	+4.7
Majority		980	1.6	+1.3
Turnout		62,378	88.0	+1.7
Registered electors		70,906		
Conservative hold		Swing	+0.6	

General election 1950: Chislehurst
Party	Candidate	Votes	%	±%
Conservative	Patricia Hornsby-Smith	25,215	44.8	+7.5
Labour	George Wallace	25,048	44.5	–5.0
Liberal	David Hughes	6,039	10.7	–2.5
Majority		167	0.3	N/A
Turnout		56,302	86.3	+13.9
Registered electors		65,231		
Conservative gain from Labour		Swing	+6.2	

=== Elections in the 1940s ===
General election 1945: Chislehurst
Party	Candidate	Votes	%
Labour	George Wallace	25,522	49.5
Conservative	Nigel Fisher	19,243	37.3
Liberal	Ernest Hawkins	6,824	13.2
Majority		6,279	12.2
Turnout		51,589	72.4
Registered electors		71,246	
Labour win (new boundaries)			

=== Elections in the 1930s ===
General election 1935: Chislehurst
Party	Candidate	Votes	%	±%
Conservative	Waldron Smithers	38,705	68.9	–16.1
Labour	Tom Colyer	12,227	21.8	+6.7
Liberal	J. Alun Williams	5,238	9.3	New
Majority		26,478	47.1	–22.8
Turnout		56,170	66.1	–3.7
Registered electors		85,024		
Conservative hold		Swing	–11.4	

General election 1931: Chislehurst
Party	Candidate	Votes	%	±%
Conservative	Waldron Smithers	32,371	85.0	+31.1
Labour	Tom Colyer	5,731	15.0	–2.3
Majority		26,640	69.8	+44.8
Turnout		38,102	69.8	+0.2
Registered electors		54,589		
Conservative hold		Swing	+16.7	

=== Elections in the 1920s ===
General election 1929: Chislehurst
Party	Candidate	Votes	%	±%
Unionist	Waldron Smithers	16,909	53.9	−12.2
Liberal	James Bateman	9,025	28.8	+12.1
Labour	James Thomson	5,445	17.4	+0.2
Majority		7,884	25.1	−23.8
Turnout		31,379	69.6	−3.2
Registered electors		45,116		
Unionist hold		Swing	−12.1	

General election 1924: Chislehurst
Party	Candidate	Votes	%	±%
Unionist	Waldron Smithers	14,440	66.1	+10.6
Labour	John Thomson	3,757	17.2	New
Liberal	Robert Nevill	3,647	16.7	−27.8
Majority		10,683	48.9	+38.0
Turnout		21,844	72.7	+12.2
Registered electors		30,020		
Unionist hold		Swing	–3.3	

David Mason

General election 1923: Chislehurst
Party	Candidate	Votes	%	±%
Unionist	Robert Nesbitt	9,725	55.5	−9.9
Liberal	Robert Nevill	7,806	44.5	+9.9
Majority		1,919	10.9	−19.8
Turnout		17,531	60.5	−3.2
Registered electors		28,961		
Unionist hold		Swing	−9.9	

General election 1922: Chislehurst
Party	Candidate	Votes	%	±%
Unionist	Robert Nesbitt	11,801	65.4	−11.4
Liberal	David Mason	6,256	34.6	New
Majority		5,545	30.7	−23.0
Turnout		18,057	63.7	+23.3
Registered electors		28,336		
Unionist hold		Swing	–23.0	

=== Elections in the 1910s ===
General election 1918: Chislehurst
Party		Candidate	Votes	%
C	Unionist	Alfred Smithers	8,314	76.8
	National	Alfred Edmunds	2,507	23.2
Majority			5,807	53.6
Turnout			10,821	40.4
Registered electors			26,801	
	Unionist win (new seat)			
C indicates candidate endorsed by the coalition government.

== See also ==
- List of parliamentary constituencies in London
