= George Wallace, Baron Wallace of Coslany =

British Labour Party politician

The Right Honourable The Lord Wallace of Coslany

Member of Parliament for Norwich North
- In office 15 October 1964 – 8 February 1974
- Preceded by: John Paton
- Succeeded by: David Ennals

Member of Parliament for Chislehurst
- In office 5 July 1945 – 3 February 1950
- Preceded by: Waldron Smithers
- Succeeded by: Patricia Hornsby-Smith

Member of the House of Lords
- Lord Temporal
- Life peerage 17 January 1975 – 11 November 2003

Personal details
- Born: George Douglas Wallace; 18 April 1906 Cheltenham, England
- Died: 11 November 2003 (aged 97) Sidcup, Kent, England
- Party: Labour
- Occupation: Politician

George Douglas Wallace, Baron Wallace of Coslany (18 April 1906 – 11 November 2003) was a British Labour Party politician.

Wallace was born in Cheltenham and attended Cheltenham Central School. He became an office manager before volunteering to join the RAF in 1941, serving during World War II and rising to the rank of Sergeant.

He was elected as the Member of Parliament (MP) for Chislehurst in 1945 general election. In 1950, Wallace lost to Conservative Dame Patricia Hornsby-Smith by 167 votes. It was 14 years later in 1964 before he returned to Parliament, representing Norwich North. He retired from the House of Commons at the February 1974 election, and became a life peer as Baron Wallace of Coslany, of Coslany in the City of Norwich, on 17 January 1975.

Wallace served as a Lord-in-waiting from 1977 to 1979, and was a member of the Commonwealth War Graves Commission from 1970 to 1986.

== Arms ==
Coat of arms of George Wallace, Baron Wallace of Coslany

Coronet
A Coronet of a Baron
Crest
Statant within a Chaplet of Turkey Oak Vert a lion in train aspect Gules Head Mane and Tail Tufts Or supporting the Shaft of a Spear Gules Headed Or pendent therefrom on a Crossbar by a Cord Azure and Or a Gonfalon of the Arms
Escutcheon
Or a Turkey Oak Tree eradicated Vert in base a Portcullis chained orle-wise Azure on a Chief of the last a Representation of Norwich Castle Argent masoned proper its Portal Or closed by a Portcullis Azure all between in the flanks two Roses Gules barbed and seeded stalked and leaved proper
Supporters
Dexter: a Horse Argent; Sinister: a Lion Or Head and Mane Gules, each rampant on a Hillock of two Grassy Mounds the innermost higher than the other both within a Circular Wall proper masoned Or growing from the dexter Hillock between two Double roses Argent upon Gules an Oak Sprig proper fructed Or and from the sinister Hillock between two like Oak Sprigs another Double Rose Argent upon Gules all three roses barbed seeded stalked and leaved proper
Motto
Usque Ad Finem (Right on to the end)

== Footnotes ==
Parliament of the United Kingdom
Preceded by Waldron Smithers	Member of Parliament for Chislehurst; 1945–1950	Succeeded by Patricia Hornsby-Smith
Preceded by John Paton	Member of Parliament for Norwich North; 1964 – February 1974	Succeeded by David Ennals
