= 1955 Orpington by-election =

Parliamentary by-election for the constituency of Orbington, Kent

The 1955 Orpington by-election was a parliamentary by-election held on 20 January 1955 for the British House of Commons constituency of Orpington in Kent, England. It followed the death of the incumbent Conservative Member of Parliament (MP) Sir Waldron Smithers. The seat was held by the Conservatives.

The by-election was notable in that Sumner as the incumbent chairman of the divisional Conservative Association defeated Margaret Thatcher to be adopted prospective candidate for the local constituency. The Liberal Party announced that it would not contest the by-election.

== Result ==
1955 Orpington by-election
Party	Candidate	Votes	%	±%
Conservative	Donald Sumner	20,082	65.8	+3.1
Labour	R. David Vaughan Williams	10,426	34.2	−3.1
Majority		9,656	31.6	+6.2
Turnout		30,508	55.4	−26.6
Registered electors		55,069		
Conservative hold		Swing	+3.1	
