= Mansfield Park =

1814 novel by Jane Austen

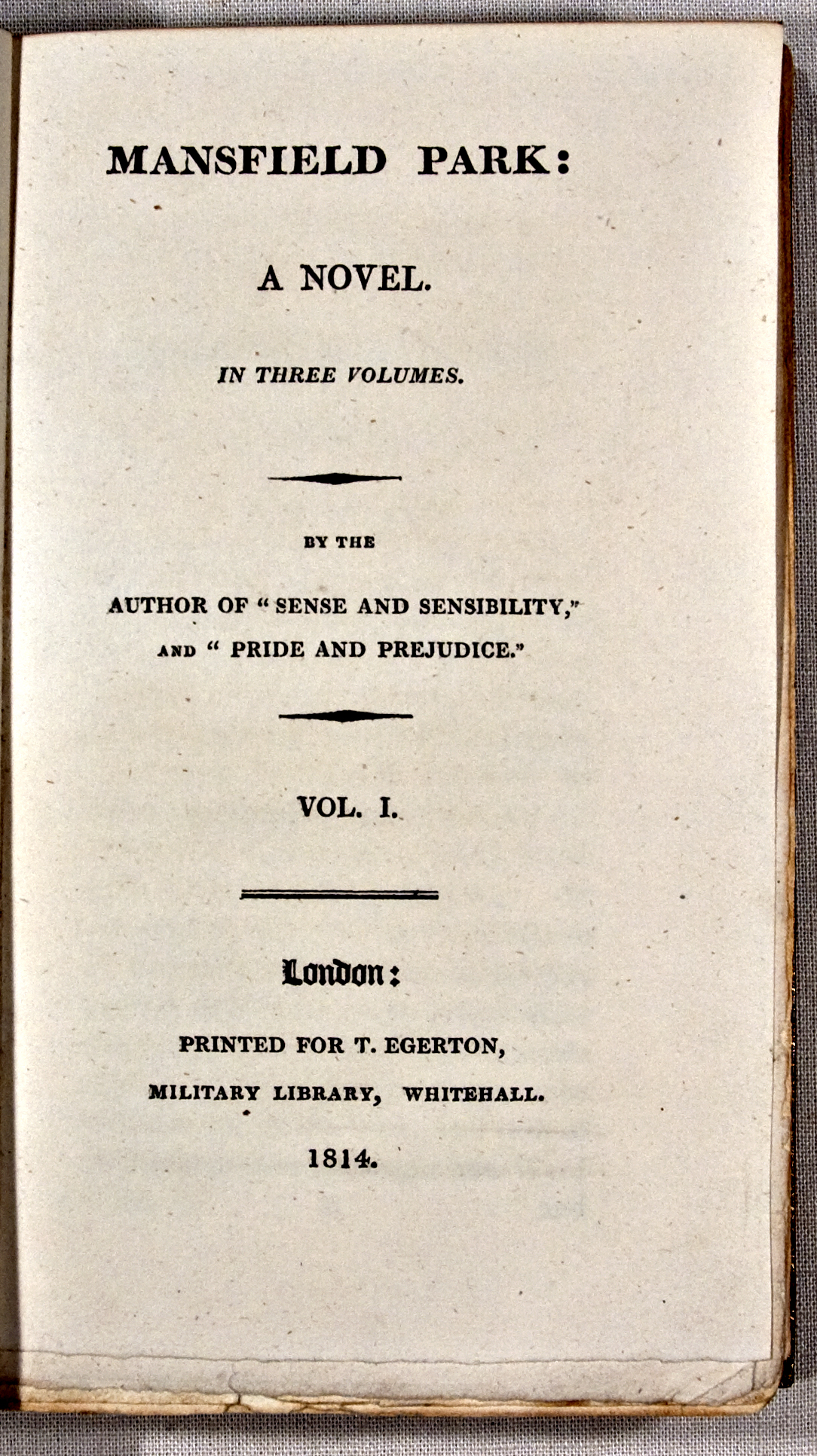
- Title page of the first edition, 1814
- Author: Jane Austen
- Language: English
- Publisher: Thomas Egerton
- Publication date: 2 July 1814
- Publication place: United Kingdom
- Text: Mansfield Park at Wikisource

Mansfield Park is the third published novel by the English author Jane Austen, first published in 1814 by Thomas Egerton. A second edition was published in 1816 by John Murray, still within Austen's lifetime. The novel did not receive any public reviews until 1821.

The novel tells the story of Fanny Price, starting when her overburdened family sends her at the age of ten to live in the household of her wealthy aunt and uncle and following her development into early adulthood. From early on critical interpretation has been diverse, differing particularly over the character of the heroine, Austen's views about theatrical performance and the centrality or otherwise of ordination and religion, and on the question of slavery. Some of these problems have been highlighted in the several later adaptations of the story for stage and screen.

== Plot summary ==
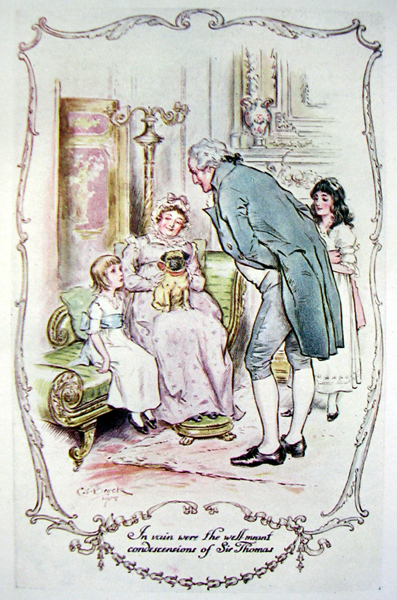
The young Fanny and the "well meant condescensions of Sir Thomas Bertram" on her arrival at Mansfield Park. A 1903 edition

10-year-old Fanny Price is sent from her impoverished home in Portsmouth to live with the family at Mansfield Park. Lady Bertram is Fanny’s aunt and her four children – Tom, Edmund, Maria and Julia – are older than Fanny. All but Edmund mistreat her, and her other aunt, Mrs Norris, wife of the clergyman at the Mansfield parsonage, makes herself particularly unpleasant.

When Fanny is 15, Aunt Norris is widowed and her visits to Mansfield Park increase, as does her mistreatment of Fanny. A year later, Sir Thomas leaves to deal with problems on his sugar plantation in Antigua, taking with him his spendthrift eldest son Tom. Mrs Norris, looking for a husband for Maria, finds the rich but weak-willed Mr Rushworth, whose proposal Maria accepts but only for his money.

Henry Crawford and his sister Mary arrive at the parsonage to stay with their half-sister, the wife of the new incumbent, Dr Grant. With their fashionable London ways, they enliven the great house. Edmund and Mary then start to show interest in one another.

On a visit to Mr Rushworth's estate, Henry flirts with both Maria and Julia. Maria believes Henry is in love with her and so treats Mr Rushworth dismissively, provoking his jealousy, while Julia struggles with jealousy and resentment towards her sister. Mary is disappointed to learn that Edmund will be a clergyman and tries to undermine his vocation.

After Tom returns to Mansfield Park ahead of his father, he encourages the young people to begin rehearsals for an amateur performance of Elizabeth Inchbald's play Lovers' Vows. Edmund objects, believing Sir Thomas would disapprove and feeling that the subject matter is inappropriate but, after much pressure, he agrees to take on the role of the lover of the character played by Mary. The play also provides further opportunity for Henry and Maria to flirt. When Sir Thomas arrives home unexpectedly, he is furious to find the play still in rehearsal and it is cancelled. Henry departs without explanation and in reaction Maria, who had mistakenly believed Henry to love her, goes ahead with marriage to Mr Rushworth. The couple then settle in London, taking Julia with them. Sir Thomas sees many improvements in Fanny and Mary Crawford initiates a closer relationship with her.

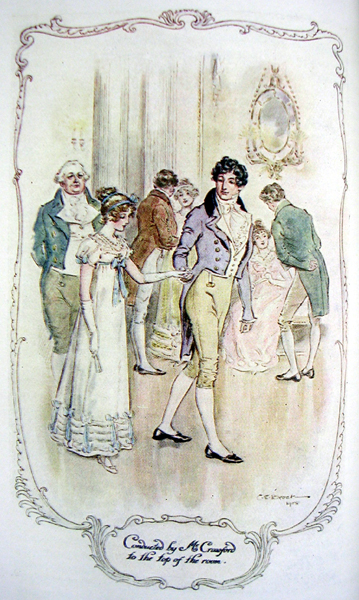
Fanny, led by Henry Crawford at her celebration ball

When Henry returns to Mansfield Park, he decides to entertain himself by making Fanny fall in love with him. Fanny's brother William visits, and Sir Thomas holds what is effectively a coming-out ball for her. Although Mary dances with Edmund, she tells him it will be the last time, as she will never dance with a clergyman. Edmund drops his plan to propose and leaves the next day, as do Henry and William.

When Henry next returns, he announces to Mary his intention to marry Fanny. To assist his plan, he has used his family's naval connections to help William achieve promotion. However, when Henry proposes marriage, Fanny rejects him, disapproving of his past treatment of women. Sir Thomas is astonished by her continuing refusal, but she does not explain, afraid of compromising Maria.

To help Fanny appreciate Henry's offer, Sir Thomas sends her to visit her parents in Portsmouth, where she is taken aback by the contrast between their chaotic household and the harmonious environment at Mansfield. Henry visits, but although she still refuses him, she begins to appreciate his good features.

Later, Fanny learns that Henry and Maria have had an affair which is reported in the newspapers. Mr Rushworth sues Maria for divorce and the Bertram family is devastated. Tom meanwhile falls gravely ill. Edmund takes Fanny back to Mansfield Park, where she is a healing influence. Sir Thomas realises that Fanny was right to reject Henry's proposal and now regards her as a daughter.

During a meeting with Mary Crawford, Edmund discovers that Mary's regret is only that Henry's adultery was discovered. Devastated, he breaks off the relationship and returns to Mansfield Park, where he confides in Fanny. Eventually the two marry and move to Mansfield parsonage following Dr Grant's departure. Meanwhile, those left at Mansfield Park have learned from their mistakes and life becomes pleasanter there.

== Characters ==
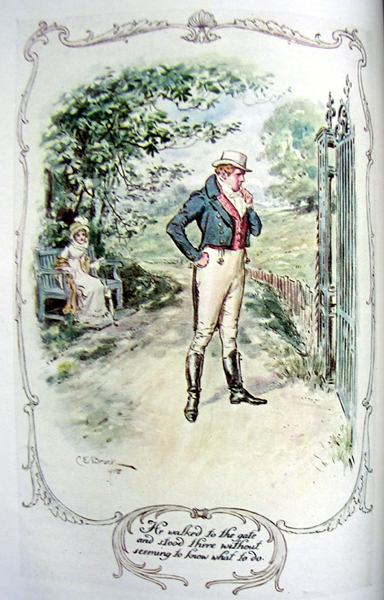
Perplexed Mr Rushworth contemplating the locked gate at the Sotherton ha-ha.

- Fanny Price, the niece of the family at Mansfield Park, with the status of a dependent poor relation.
- Maria, Lady Bertram, Fanny's aunt. Married to the wealthy Sir Thomas Bertram, she is the middle one of three sisters of the Ward family, the others being Mrs Norris and Fanny's mother, Mrs Price.
- Mrs Norris, elder sister of Lady Bertram, whose husband was the local parson until his death.
- Sir Thomas Bertram, baronet and husband of Fanny's aunt, owner of the Mansfield Park estate and one in Antigua.
- Thomas Bertram, elder son of Sir Thomas and Lady Bertram, seven years older than Fanny.
- Edmund Bertram, younger son of Sir Thomas and Lady Bertram, who plans to become a clergyman, six years older than Fanny.
- Maria Bertram, elder daughter of Sir Thomas and Lady Bertram, three years older than Fanny.
- Julia Bertram, younger daughter of Sir Thomas and Lady Bertram, two years older than Fanny.
- Dr Grant, incumbent of the Mansfield Park living after Mr Norris dies.
- Mrs Grant, wife of Dr Grant, and half-sister of Henry and Mary Crawford.
- Henry Crawford, brother of Miss Crawford and half-brother of Mrs Grant.
- Mary Crawford, sister of Mr Crawford and half-sister of Mrs Grant.
- Mr. James Rushworth, Maria Bertram's fiancé, then husband.
- The Hon. John Yates, friend of Tom Bertram.
- William Price, Fanny's older brother, a midshipman and then lieutenant in the Royal Navy.
- Mr Price, Fanny's father, a retired officer in the Marines who lives in Portsmouth.
- Mrs Price, born Frances (Fanny) Ward, Fanny's mother.
- Susan Price, Fanny's younger sister.
- Lady Stornoway, a society woman, complicit in Mr Crawford and Maria's flirtation in London.
- Mrs Rushworth, Mr Rushworth's mother and Maria's mother-in-law.
- Baddeley, the butler at Mansfield Park.
- Mr Harding, a friend of Sir Thomas' in London.

== Literary reception ==
Although Mansfield Park was initially ignored by reviewers, it was a great success with the public. The first printing in 1814 sold out within six months. The second in 1816 also sold out. The first critical review in 1821 by Richard Whately was positive. At first, critics praised the novel's wholesome morality. The Victorian consensus treated Austen's novels as social comedy. In 1911, A. C. Bradley restored the moral perspective, praising Mansfield Park for being artistic while having "deeply at heart the importance of certain truths about conduct". The influential Lionel Trilling (1954), and later Thomas Tanner (1968), maintained emphasis on the novel's deep moral strength. Thomas Edwards (1965) argued that there were more shades of grey in Mansfield Park than in her other novels, and that those who craved a simple dualist worldview might find this off-putting. In the 1970s, Alistair Duckworth (1971) and Marilyn Butler (1975) laid the foundation for a more comprehensive understanding of the novel's historical allusions and context.

By the 1970s, Mansfield Park was considered Austen's most controversial novel. In 1974, the American literary critic Joel Weinsheimer described Mansfield Park as perhaps the most profound of her novels and certainly the most complicated.

The American scholar John Halperin (1975) was particularly negative, describing Mansfield Park as the "most eccentric" of Austen's novels and her greatest failure. He attacked the novel for what he saw as its inane heroine, its pompous hero, a ponderous plot, and "viperish satire". He described the Bertram family as appalling characters, full of self-righteousness, debauchery and greed, financial advantage being their only interest. He complained that the scenes set in Portsmouth were far more interesting than those in Mansfield Park, and that having consistently portrayed the Bertram family as greedy, selfish and materialistic, Austen, in the last chapters, presented life at Mansfield Park in idealised terms.

The latter part of the twentieth century saw the development of diverse readings, including feminist and post-colonial criticism, the most influential of the latter being Edward Said's Jane Austen and Empire (1983). While some continued to attack, and others to praise the novel's conservative morality, yet others saw it as ultimately challenging formal conservative values in favour of compassion and a deeper morality, and posing a challenge to subsequent generations. Isobel Armstrong (1988) argued for an open understanding of the text, that it should be seen as an exploration of problems rather than a statement of conclusions.

To Susan Morgan (1987), Mansfield Park was the most difficult of Austen's novels, featuring the weakest of all her heroines yet one who ends up the most beloved member of her family.

Readings by the beginning of the 21st century commonly took for granted Mansfield Park as Austen's most historically searching novel. Most engaged with her highly sophisticated renderings of the characters' psychological lives and with historical formations such as Evangelicalism and the consolidation of British imperial power.

Colleen Sheehan (2004) said,

Despite Austen's ultimate and clear condemnation of the Crawfords, much of contemporary scholarship bemoans their literary fates. It is a common cant of critics that they would delight in an evening with Henry and Mary Crawford and anticipate in horror having to spend one with Fanny Price and Edmund Bertram. ... Like the Crawfords, they have rejected the orientation and obscured the moral perspective that inspired Austen in her writing of Mansfield Park. This is the affliction of our times. We are too easily charmed by the subversive.

In 2014, celebrating the passing of 200 years since the novel's publication, Paula Byrne wrote, "Ignore its uptight reputation, Mansfield Park ... seethes with sex and explores England's murkiest corners". She called it pioneering for being about meritocracy. In 2017, Corinne Fowler revisited Said's thesis, reviewing its significance in the light of more recent critical developments in imperial history.

== Development, themes and symbols ==
=== Background ===
The novel has many autobiographical associations; some of these are indicated in the following sections about critical discussions of important themes. Austen drew considerably on her own experience and the knowledge of her family and friends. Her acute observation of human behaviour informs the development of all her characters. In Mansfield Park, she continues her practice, like that of the portrait miniaturist, of painting on ivory "with so fine a brush". Apart from a day's visit to Sotherton and three months' confinement in Portsmouth, the novel's action is restricted to a single estate, yet its subtle allusions are global, touching on India, China and the Caribbean.

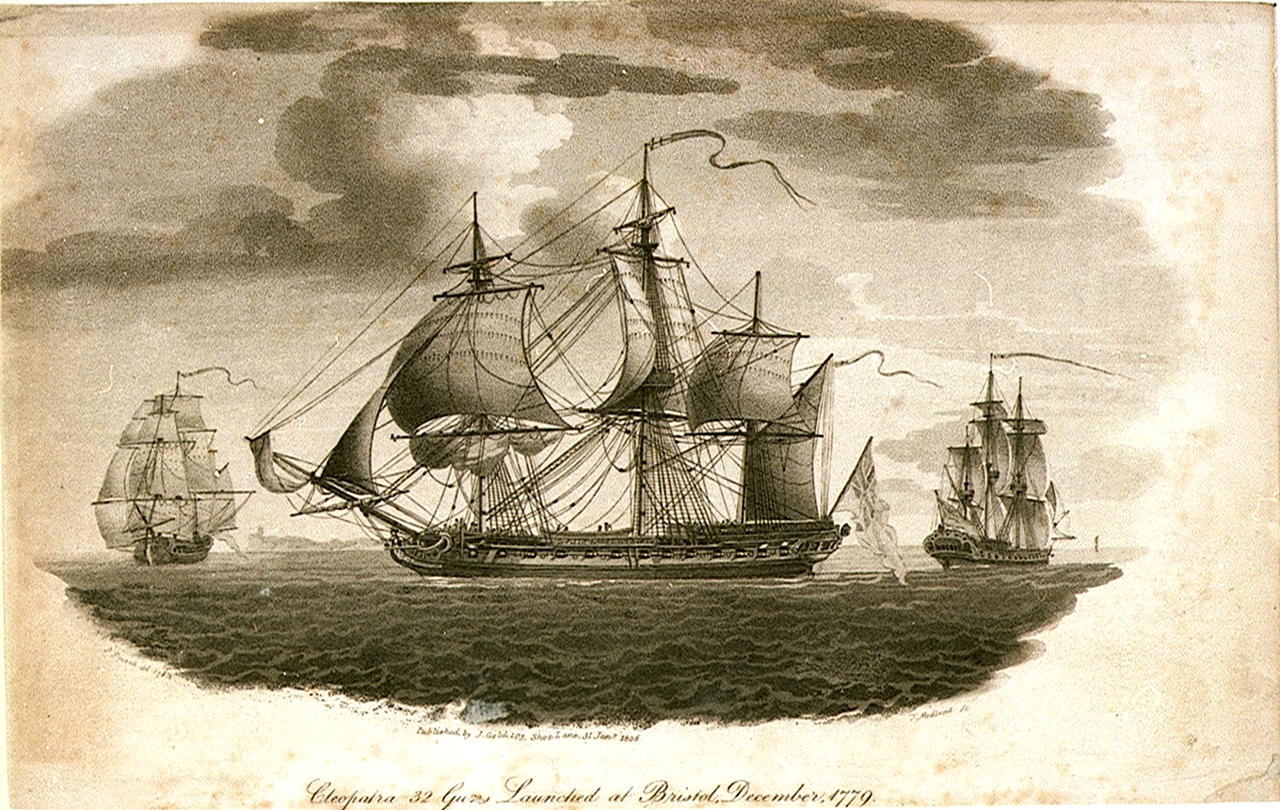
HMS Cleopatra, commanded by Jane Austen's brother Captain Charles Austen, 1810–1811, and mentioned in ch. 38.

Austen knew Portsmouth from personal experience. She records that Admiral Foote, then second-in-command at Portsmouth, was "surprised that I had the power of drawing the Portsmouth-Scenes so well". Her brother Charles Austen served as a Royal Navy officer during the Napoleonic Wars. In the novel, Fanny's brother William joins the Royal Navy as an officer, whose ship, HMS Thrush, is sited right next to HMS Cleopatra at Spithead. Captain Austen commanded HMS Cleopatra during her cruise in North American waters to hunt French ships from September 1810 to June 1811. If the novel refers to the ship in its historical context, this would date the main events of the novel as 1810–1811. William's tales of his life as a midshipman recounted to the Bertrams would have indicated to early readers that he had sailed with Nelson to the Caribbean. Lady Bertram requests two shawls if he goes to the East Indies.

William gives Fanny the gift of an amber cross. This echoes the gift of topaz crosses given by Charles Austen to his sisters before he set sail to the Royal Navy's North America stations in Halifax and Bermuda. In Fanny's East room, Edmund speculates from her reading that she will be 'taking a trip into China' in the footsteps of Lord Macartney's pioneering cultural mission.

=== Symbolic locations and events ===
The first critic to draw attention to the novel's extensive use of symbolic representation was Virginia Woolf in 1913. Three overtly symbolic events are: the visit to neighbouring Sotherton and the ha-ha with its locked gate (ch. 9–10), the extensive preparation for the theatricals and its aftermath (ch. 13–20), and the game of Speculation (ch. 25) where, says David Selwyn, the card game is a "metaphor for the game Mary Crawford is playing, with Edmund as stake". 'Speculation' also references Sir Thomas's unpredictable investments in the West Indies and Tom's gambling, which causes financial embarrassment to Sir Thomas and reduced prospects for Edmund, not to mention the speculative nature of the marriage market. Also to be found are underlying allusions to Biblical themes of temptation, sin, judgement and redemption. The 'keys' to these are found at Sotherton. Felicia Bonaparte argues that in a striking postmodern way, Fanny Price is a realistic figure, but also a figure in a design. She sees Fanny as the 'pearl of great price' in the parable of the Kingdom recorded in Matthew 13:45-46, the 'kingdom' relating to both contemporary society and a kingdom yet to be revealed.

== Opinions about Fanny Price ==
Nina Auerbach (1980), identifying with the ambivalence experienced by many readers, asks "how ought we to feel about Fanny Price?"

Austen's mother thought Fanny insipid, though other unpublished private reviewers liked the character (Austen collected comments by those in her social circle). Many have seen Fanny Price as a nineteenth century Cinderella.

A major debate concerns whether or not the character of Fanny is meant to be ironic, a parody of the wholesome heroines so popular in Regency novels. Lionel Trilling (1957) maintained that Austen created Fanny as "irony directed against irony itself". William H. Magee (1966) wrote that "irony pervades, if (it) does not dominate, the presentation of Fanny Price". By contrast, Andrew Wright (1968) argued that Fanny "is presented straight-forwardly, without any contradiction of any kind".

Thomas Edwards (1965) regarded Fanny as the most vulnerable of all the Austen heroines and therefore the most human. He argued that even Fanny's limited morality had much to commend it. Austen biographer Claire Tomalin (1997) argues that Fanny rises to her moment of heroism when she rejects the obedience that, as a woman, she has been schooled to accept and follows the higher dictate of her own conscience.

=== Priggish? ===
Clara Calvo (2005) says that many modern readers find it difficult to sympathise with Fanny's timidity and her disapproval of the theatricals, finding her "priggish, passive, naive and hard to like". Priggishness has been a longstanding criticism of Austen's heroine. Wiltshire (2005) challenges the negative judgement of Fanny suggesting that it is the apparent conservatism of the novel that makes it confronting, and that "many readers cannot get past it".

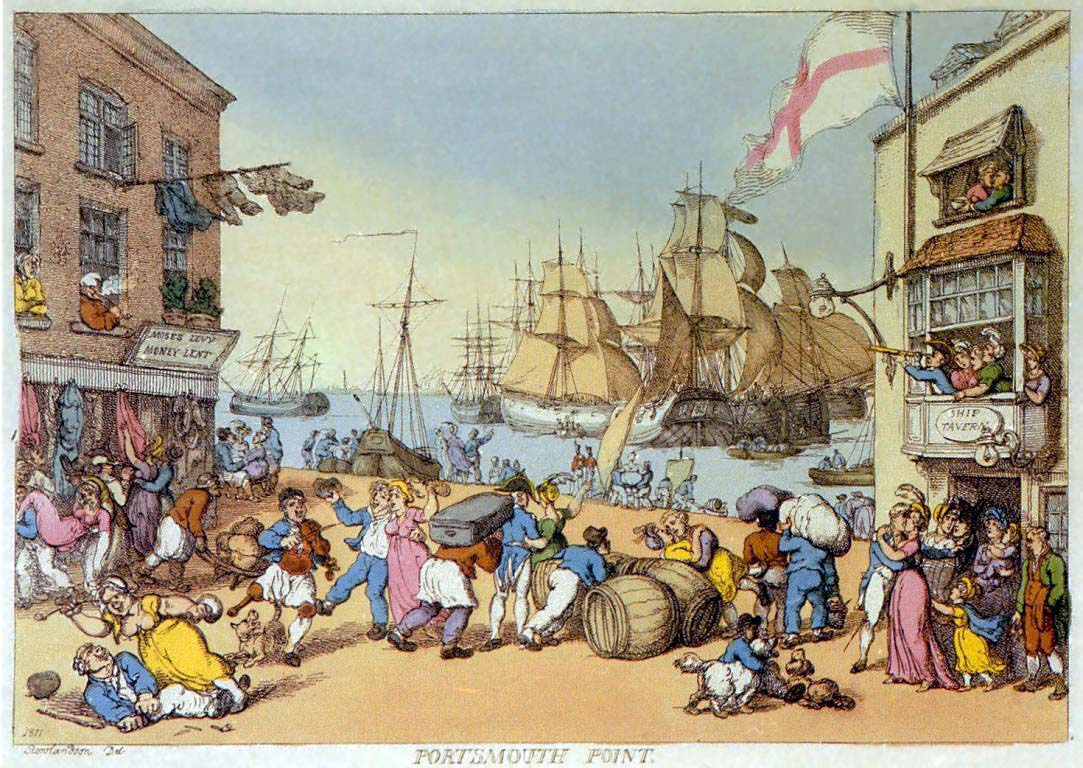
Portsmouth Point by Thomas Rowlandson, 1811. Popular with sailors on leave from ships moored at Spithead; notorious for lewd behaviour

Tomalin sees Fanny as a complex personality who, despite her frailty, shows courage and grows in self-esteem during the latter part of the story. Her faith, which gives her the courage to resist what she thinks is wrong, sometimes makes her intolerant of the sinners. Fanny, always self-reflective, is intolerant of her own intolerance. Change in her character is most marked during her three months exposure to Portsmouth life. Initially, shocked by the coarseness and impropriety of her parental home and its neighbourhood, she condemns it. While now recognising she can never be at home in Portsmouth, she gradually overcomes her acknowledged prejudices, recognises the distinctive qualities of her siblings, and works hard not to cause offence. In the wider community, judgement is more even-handed; Fanny does not take to the young ladies of the town and they, offended by the 'airs' of one who neither plays on the pianoforte nor wears fine pelisses, do not take to her. She comes to see that part of her physical frailty stems from the debilitating effect of the internal arguments, conversations and identifications that sap her energy.

Auerbach suggests that Fanny, as the quiet observer, adopts "the audience's withering power over performance". She says, "our discomfort at Fanny is in part our discomfort at our own voyeurism", and that we implicate ourselves as well as Fanny "in a community of compelling English monsters".

Paula Byrne (2014) says, "At the centre of the book is a displaced child with an unshakeable conscience. A true heroine."

=== Fanny's inner world ===
Fanny is unique amongst the Austen heroines in that her story begins when she is ten and traces her story up to age eighteen. Byrne says, "Mansfield Park is perhaps the first novel in history to depict the life of a little girl from within". By the beginning of the 21st century, says John Wiltshire, critics, appreciating Austen's highly sophisticated renderings of her character's psychological lives, now understood Fanny, formerly seen as the principled pivot of moral right (celebrated by some critics, berated by others) as "a trembling, unstable entity, [an] erotically driven and conflicted figure, both victim and apostle of values inscribed within her by her history of adoption". Joan Klingel Ray suggests that Fanny is Austen's insightful study of "the battered-child syndrome", a victim of emotional and material abuse in both households. From early on she is seen as mentally and physically fragile, a little girl with low self-esteem, vulnerable and thin-skinned. The rock on which she stands, enabling her to survive, is the love of her older brother William. At Mansfield, her cousin Edmund gradually takes on a similar role; both young men fulfil the essential role of care-giver left vacant by the adults. The East room, which Fanny gradually appropriates, becomes her safe place, her "nest of comforts" to which, though unheated, she retreats in times of stress. Here she reflects on her sufferings; the misunderstanding of her motives, her disregarded feelings, and her understanding undervalued. She considers the pain of tyranny, ridicule and neglect, but concludes that nearly every incident led to some benefit and the chief consolation had always been Edmund.

The trauma of her dislocation at the age of ten is recalled by Fanny eight years later when she is promised a visit to her birth family. "The remembrance of all her earliest pleasures, and of what she had suffered in being torn from them, came over her with renewed strength, and it seemed as if to be at home again would heal every pain that had since grown out of the separation." The pain of separation is as evident as is the idealisation of her former life at Portsmouth, an idealisation that masks the deeper pain of an abandonment soon to be acknowledged. John Wiltshire, returning to the theme in 2014, describes Fanny as "a heroine damaged early by her upbringing, as well as by her quasi-adoption, who experiences intense conflict between gratitude to her adoptive family and the deepest rebellion against them", a rebellion scarcely conscious.

=== Feminist irony ===
Negative criticism of Fanny sometimes identifies with that voiced by characters in the novel. For some early feminists, Fanny Price was close to being considered, as she was by Mrs Norris, "the daemon of the piece". Many have despised her as "creepmouse", as her cousin Tom does.

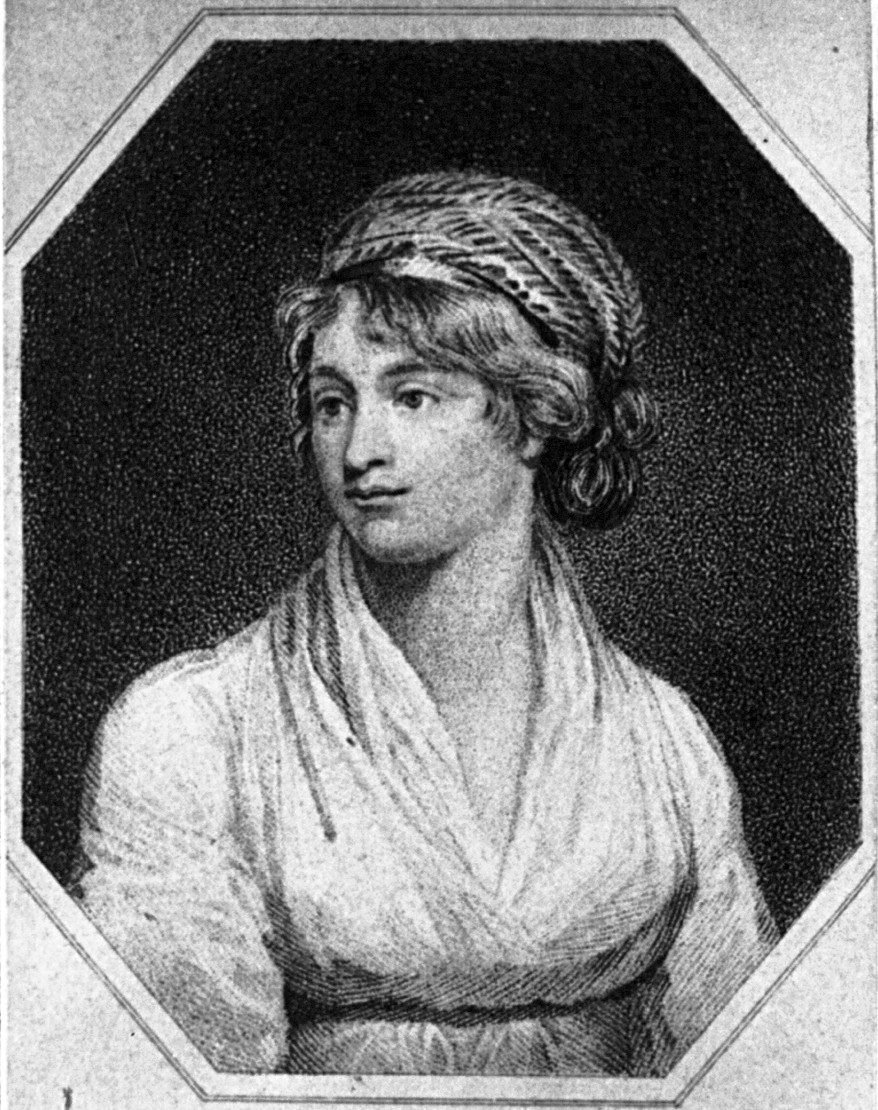
Mary Wollstonecraft, contemporary proto-feminist writer, and critic of Rousseau.

Margaret Kirkham (1983) in her essay "Feminist Irony and the Priceless Heroine of Mansfield Park" argued that Austen was a feminist writer who liked complexity and humour and enjoyed presenting puzzles for her readers. Many have missed the feminist irony of the character of Fanny. Austen was a feminist in the sense that she believed women were as endowed with reason and common sense as men, and that the ideal marriage should be between two people who love each other. Ironically, the love match portrayed between Fanny's parents is far from ideal.

Kirkham sees Mansfield Park as an attack on Jean-Jacques Rousseau's popular 1762 work, Emile, or On Education, which depicted the ideal woman as fragile, submissive, and physically weaker than men. Rousseau stated: "So far from being ashamed of their weakness, they glory in it; their tender muscles make no resistance; they affect to be incapable of lifting the smallest burdens, and would blush to be thought robust and strong." The contemporary philosopher Mary Wollstonecraft wrote at length against Rousseau's views in A Vindication of the Rights of Woman. She also challenged followers of Rousseau like James Fordyce, whose sermons had long been a part of a young woman's library.

At the beginning of the novel, Fanny, with her constant illnesses, timid disposition, submissiveness and fragility, conforms outwardly to Rousseau's ideal woman. Subversively, her passivity is primarily that of a victim determined to survive, the result of the trauma of her dislocation and the internal complexities of her mental well-being. The once beautiful aunt Bertram, in her indolence and passivity, also satirises the stereotype. In the end, Fanny survives by unwittingly undermining prevailing attitudes to propriety as she finds the strength to place conscience above obedience and love above duty. Fanny's refusal to capitulate to Sir Thomas' wish that she marry Henry Crawford is seen by Kirkham as the moral climax of the novel. Through her deep-seated integrity and compassion, her reason and common sense, she is able to triumph, thus challenging the prevailing ideal of femininity (and propriety) in Regency England.

=== A woman of will ===
The American literary critic Harold Bloom calls Fanny Price "a co-descendant, together with Locke's association-menaced will, of the English Protestant emphasis upon the will's autonomy".

He draws attention to C. S. Lewis's observation that "into Fanny, Jane Austen, to counterbalance her apparent insignificance, has put really nothing except rectitude of mind, neither passion, nor physical courage, nor wit, nor resource". Bloom agrees with Lewis but argues that he misses the importance of Fanny's "will to be herself" as a causal agent in the plot. Bloom argues that paradoxically it is Fanny's lack of the "will to dominate" that enables her 'will' to succeed. Her struggle just to be herself causes her to exercise moral influence, and this leads her to triumph in the end.

=== Fanny as a 'literary monster' ===
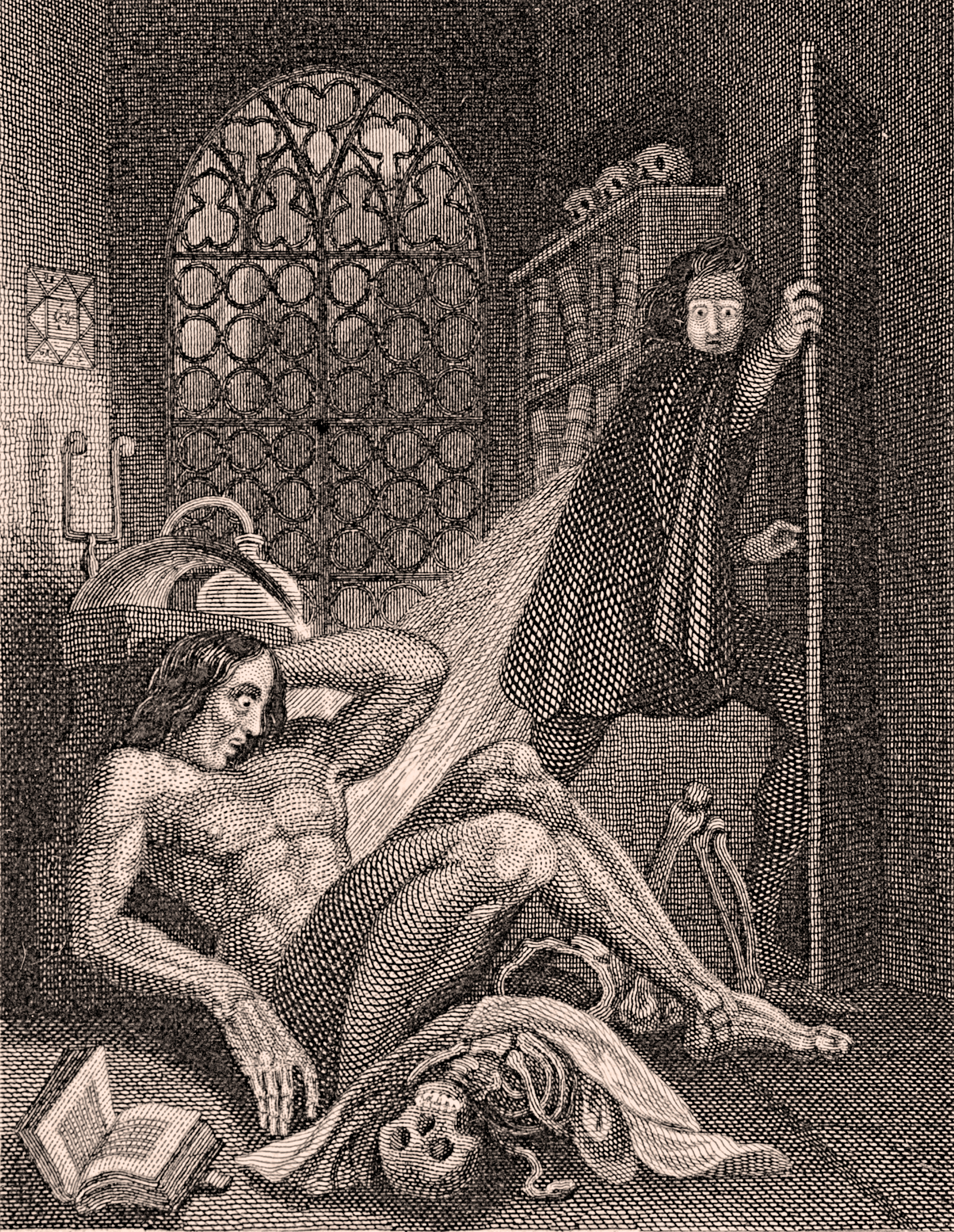
Frontispiece to Mary Shelley's Frankenstein, 1831 edition (first published in 1818)

Nina Auerbach recognises an extraordinary tenacity in Fanny "with which she adheres to an identity validated by none of the conventional female attributes of family, home, or love". By so doing, Fanny "repudiates the vulnerability of the waif to the unlovable toughness of the authentic transplant". Fanny emerges from the isolation of the outcast, becoming instead the conqueror, thus "aligning herself rather with the Romantic hero than with the heroine of romance".

To Auerbach, Fanny is a genteel version of a popular archetype of the Romantic age, "the monster", who by the sheer act of existing does not and cannot ever fit into society. In this interpretation, Fanny has little in common with any other Austen heroine, being closer to the brooding character of Hamlet, or even the monster of Mary Shelley's Frankenstein (published only four years later). Auerbach says there is "something horrible about her that deprives the imagination of its appetite for ordinary life and compels it toward the deformed, the dispossessed".

Auerbach argues that Fanny defines herself best in assertive negatives. Fanny's response to the invitation to take part in Lovers' Vows is, "No, indeed, I cannot act." In life she rarely acts, only counteracts, watching the world around her in silent judgement. Fanny is "a woman who belongs only where she is not". Her solitude is her condition, not a state from which she can be rescued. "Only in Mansfield Park does Jane Austen force us to experience the discomfort of a Romantic universe presided over by the potent charm of a heroine who was not made to be loved." Auerbach's analysis seems to fall short when Fanny finally experiences the love of her adopted family and, despite its traumas, achieves a sense of home.

== Landscape planning ==
Alistair Duckworth noted that a recurring theme in Austen's novels is the way the condition of the estates mirrors that of their owners. The very private landscape (and house) of Mansfield Park is only gradually revealed, unlike transparent Sotherton where the reader is given an introduction to its environs by Maria, a tourist's introduction to the house by Mrs Rushworth, and finally a tour of the estate guided by the serpentine wanderings of the young people.

=== Rural morality ===
The theme of country in conflict with city recurs throughout the novel. Symbolically, life-renewing nature is under attack from the artificial and corrupting effects of city society. Canadian scholar David Monaghan draws attention to the rural way of life which, with its careful respect for the order and rhythm of times and seasons, reinforces and reflects the values of "elegance, propriety, regularity, harmony". Sotherton with its carefully maintained avenue of trees is Austen's reminder of the organic principles which form the basis of society. Austen portrays Mr Rushworth and Sir Thomas as landed gentry who are unable to appreciate the principles that lie beneath received standards, consequently leaving "landed society ... ripe for corruption". Henry Crawford, as an absentee landlord, is portrayed as having no moral appreciation at all.

On a visit to London in 1796, Austen wrote jokingly to her sister, "Here I am once more in this Scene of Dissipation & vice, and I begin already to find my Morals corrupted." Through the Crawfords the reader is given glimpses of London society. They represent London's money-grubbing, vulgar middle class, the opposite of Austen's rural ideal. They come from a world where everything is to be got with money, and where impersonal crowds have replaced peace and tranquillity as the social benchmarks. Austen gives further glimpses of London society when Maria is married and gains what Mary Crawford describes as "her pennyworth", a fashionable London residence for the season. For Monaghan, it is Fanny alone who senses the moral values that lie beneath the old unfashionable manners. It falls to her to defend the best values of English society, despite in many ways being unequipped for the task.

=== Humphry Repton and improvements ===
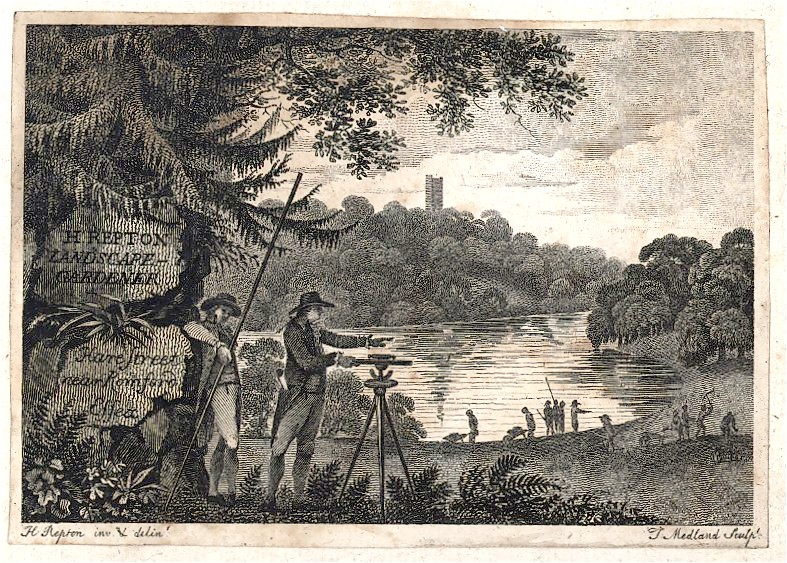
Landscape improvements – Humphry Repton's visiting card showing a typical design with himself surveying the property.

At Sotherton, Mr. Rushworth considers employing the popular landscape improver Humphry Repton, his rates being five guineas a day. Repton had coined the term "landscape gardener" and also popularised the title Park as the description of an estate. Austen is thought to have based her fictional Sotherton partly on Stoneleigh Abbey, which her uncle, Rev Thomas Leigh, inherited in 1806. On his first visit to claim the estate, he took Austen, her mother, and her sister with him. Leigh, who had already employed Repton at Adlestrop, now commissioned him to make improvements at Stoneleigh where he redirected the River Avon, flooded a section of the land to create a mirror lake, and added a bowling green lawn and cricket pitch.

Over family dinner, Mr Rushworth declares that he will do away with the great oak avenue that ascends half a mile from the west front. Mr Rushworth misunderstands Repton. In his book, Repton writes cautiously of 'the fashion ... to destroy avenues', and he parodies fashion that is merely doctrinaire. Rushworth's conversation follows closely that of Repton's parody. Fanny is disappointed and quotes Cowper, valuing what has emerged naturally over the centuries. David Monaghan (1980) contrasts Fanny's perspective with that of the others: materialistic Mary Crawford thinks only of the future, willing to accept any improvements money can buy as long as she does not have to experience present inconvenience, and Henry lives for the present moment, solely interested in playing the role of improver. Introverted and reflective Fanny, alone, can hold in her mind the bigger picture of past, present and future.

Henry Crawford is full of his own ideas for improvements when exploring Sotherton's landscape. He is described as the first to go forward to examine the 'capabilities' of the walled garden near the wilderness, hinting at ironic comparison with Repton's celebrated predecessor, Lancelot "Capability" Brown.

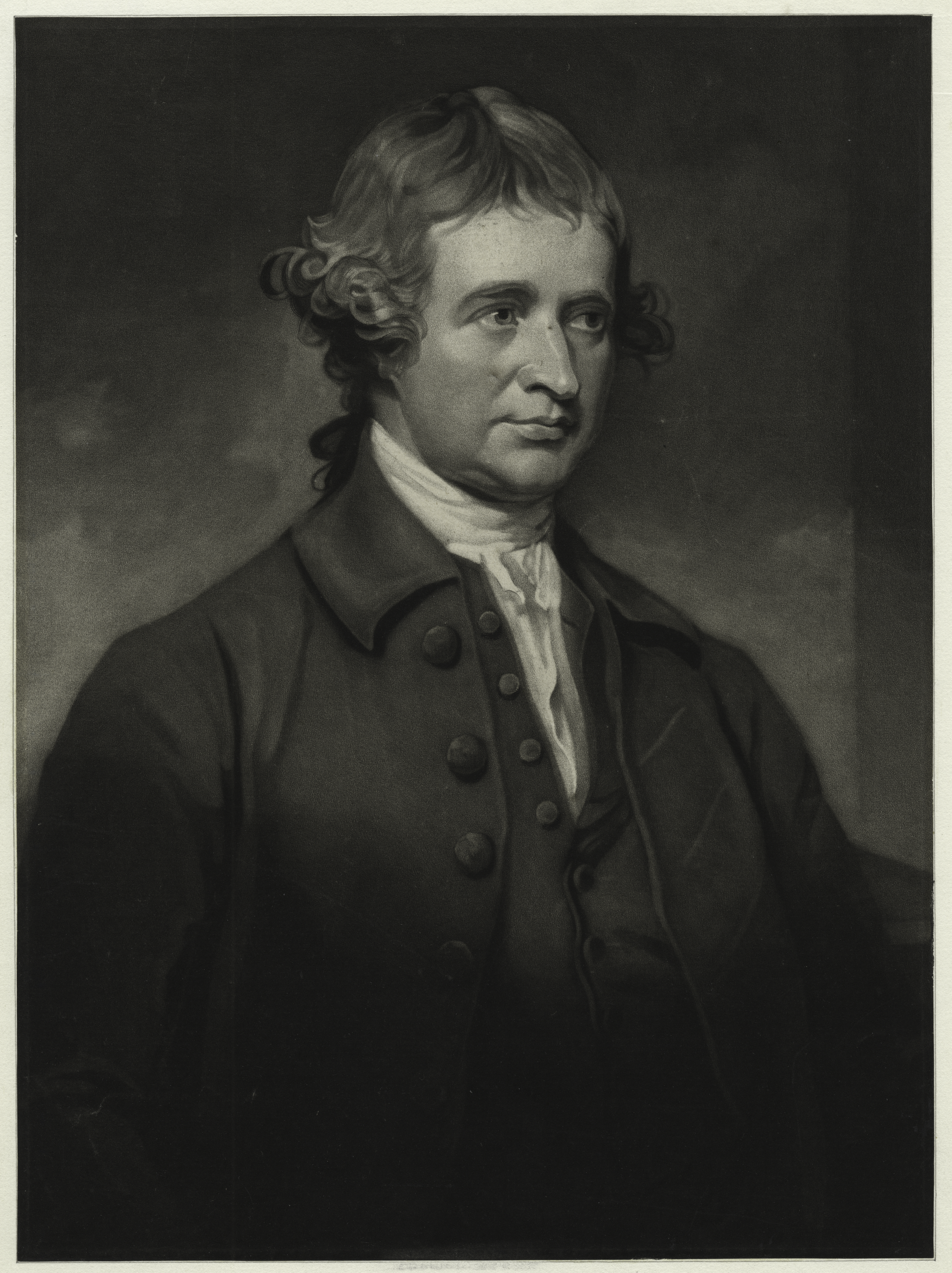
Edmund Burke, political theorist, philosopher and member of parliament, widely considered to be the father of modern Conservatism.

=== Political symbolism ===
The Napoleonic Wars (1803–1815) are part of the novel's hidden background. Calvo, quoting Roger Sales, says Mansfield Park can be read as a Condition-of-England novel that 'debates topical issues such as the conduct of the war and the Regency crisis'. Duckworth (1994) believes that Austen took the landscaping symbol from Edmund Burke's influential book, Reflections of the Revolution in France (1790). Burke affirmed the beneficial "improvements" which are part of conservation, but decried malign "innovations" and "alterations" to society which led to the destruction of heritage. Duckworth argues that Mansfield Park is pivotal to an understanding of Austen's views. Estates, like society, might be in need of improvements, but the changes allegedly advocated by Repton were unacceptable innovations, alterations to the estate that, symbolically, would destroy the entire moral and social heritage. Austen, aware of the fragility of a society uninformed by responsible individual behaviour, is committed to the inherited values of a Christian humanist culture.

The French Revolution was in Austen's view an entirely destructive force that sought to wipe out the past. Her sister-in-law, Eliza, was a French aristocrat whose first husband, the Comte de Feullide, had been guillotined in Paris. She fled to Britain where, in 1797, she married Henry Austen. Eliza's account of the Comte's execution left Austen with an intense horror of the French Revolution that lasted for the rest of her life.

Warren Roberts (1979) interprets Austen's writings as affirming traditional English values and religion over against the atheist values of the French Revolution. The character of Mary Crawford whose 'French' irreverence has alienated her from church is contrasted unfavourably with that of Fanny Price whose 'English' sobriety and faith leads her to assert that "there is something in a chapel and chaplain so much in character with a great house, with one's idea of what such a household should be". Edmund is depicted as presenting the church as a force for stability that holds together family, customs and English traditions. This is contrasted with Mary Crawford's attitude whose criticism of religious practice makes her an alien and disruptive force in the English countryside.

=== Sotherton and moral symbolism ===
Juliet McMaster argued that Austen often used understatement, and that her characters disguise hidden powerful emotions behind apparently banal behaviour and dialogue. This is evident during the visit to Sotherton where Mary Crawford, Edmund Bertram and Fanny Price debate the merits of an ecclesiastical career. Though the exchanges are light-hearted, the issues are serious. Edmund is asking Mary to love him for who he is, while Mary indicates she will only marry him if he pursues a more lucrative career in the law.

To subtly press her point, Austen has set the scene in the wilderness where their serpentine walk provides echoes of Spencer's The Faerie Queene and the "serpentining" pathways of the Wandering Wood. Spencer's "Redcrosse Knight" (the novice knight who symbolises both England and Christian faith) is lost within the dangerous and confusing Wandering Wood. The knight nearly abandons Una, his true love, for Duessa, the seductive witch. So too, Edmund (the would-be Church of England minister) is lost within the moral maze of Sotherton's wilderness.

Others have seen in this episode echoes of Shakespeare's As You Like It. Byrne sees a more direct link with regency stage comedy with which Austen was very familiar, in particular George Colman and David Garrick's highly successful play, The Clandestine Marriage (inspired by Hogarth's series of satirical paintings, Marriage A-la-Mode), which had a similar theme and a heroine called Fanny Sterling. (Sir Thomas later praises Fanny's sterling qualities.)

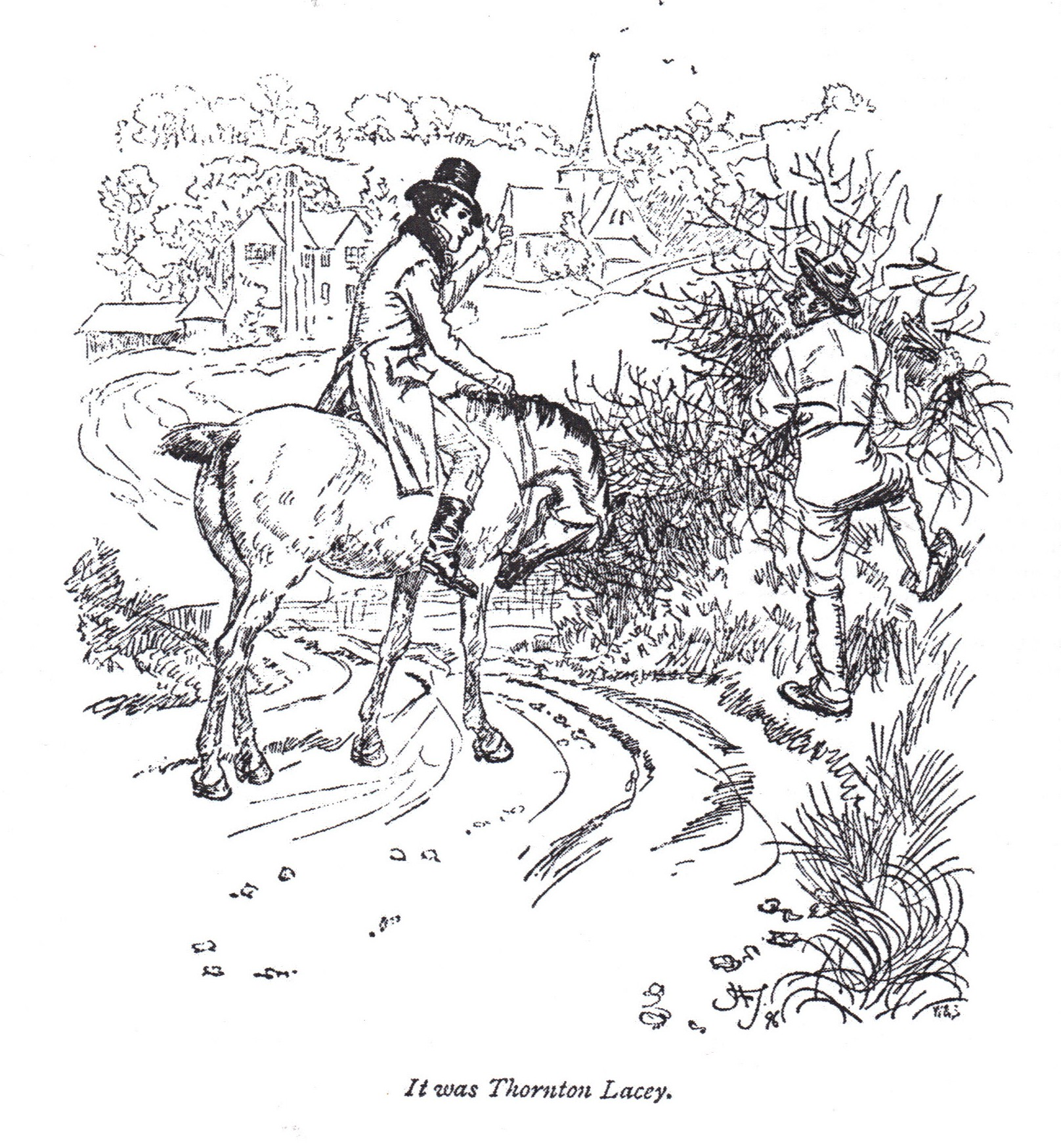
Henry Crawford visits Thornton Lacey, Edmund Bertram's future estate.

Byrne suggests that the "serpentine path" leading to the ha-ha with its locked gate at Sotherton Court has shades of Satan's tempting of Eve in the Garden of Eden. The ha-ha with its deep ditch represents a boundary which some, disobeying authority, will cross. It is a symbolic forerunner of the future moral transgressions of Maria Bertram and Henry Crawford. Colleen Sheehan compares the scenario to the Eden of Milton's Paradise Lost, where the locked iron gates open onto a deep gulf separating Hell and Heaven.

'Wilderness' was a gardening term used to describe a wooded area, often set between the formal area around the house and the pastures beyond the ha-ha. At Sotherton, it is described as "a planted wood of about two acres ...[and] was darkness and shade, and natural beauty, compared with the bowling-green and the terrace." The alternative meaning of wilderness as a wild inhospitable place would have been very familiar to Austen's readers from several uses in the King James Version of the Bible, such as the account of the testing of the Israelites through the wilderness. John Chapter 3 links this story ("as Moses lifted up the serpent in the wilderness …") with redemption through Jesus.

The characters themselves exploit Sotherton's allegorical potential. When Henry, looking across the ha-ha, says, "You have a very smiling scene before you", Maria responds, "Do you mean literally or figuratively?" Maria quotes from Sterne's novel A Sentimental Journey about a starling that alludes to the Bastille. She complains of being trapped behind the gate that gives her "a feeling of restraint and hardship". The dialogue is full of double meanings. Even Fanny's warnings about spikes, a torn garment and a fall subtly suggest moral violence. Henry insinuates to Maria that if she "really wished to be more at large" and could allow herself "to think it not prohibited", then freedom was possible. Shortly after, Edmund and Mary are also "tempted" to leave the wilderness.

Later in the novel, when Henry Crawford suggests destroying the grounds of Thornton Lacy to create something new, his plans are rejected by Edmund, who insists that although the estate needs some improvements, he wishes to preserve what has been created over the centuries. In Austen's world, a man truly worth marrying enhances his estate while respecting its tradition: Edmund's reformist conservatism marks him out as a hero.

== Theatre in Mansfield Park ==
Jocelyn Harris (2010) views Austen's main subject in Mansfield Park as the moral and social status of theatricality, a controversy as old as the stage itself. Some critics have assumed that Austen intended the novel to promote anti-theatrical views, possibly inspired by the Evangelical movement. Harris says that, whereas in Pride and Prejudice Austen shows how theatricality masks and deceives in daily life, in Mansfield Park "she interrogates more deeply the whole remarkable phenomenon of plays and play-acting".

=== Antitheatricality ===
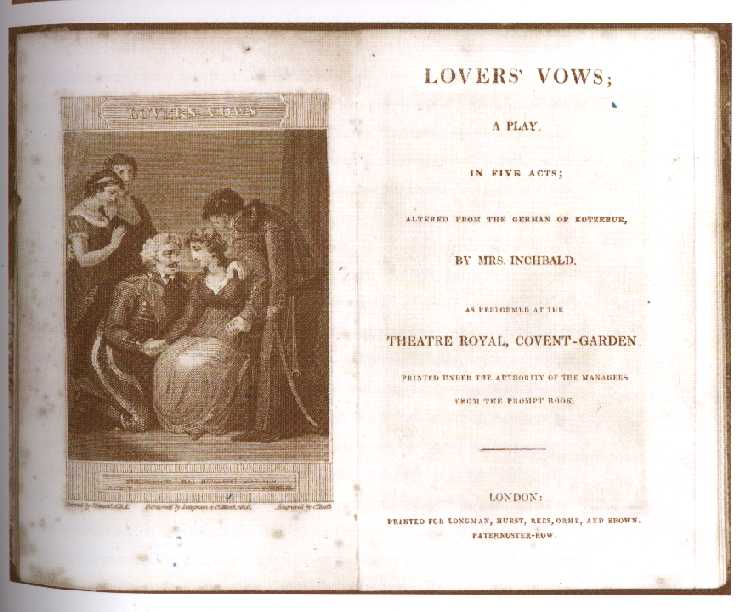
Lovers' Vows, 1796 edition. The controversial play is rehearsed at Mansfield Park during Sir Thomas Bertram's absence.

Returning unexpectedly from his plantations in Antigua, Sir Thomas Bertram discovers the young people rehearsing a production of Elizabeth Inchbald's Lovers' Vows (adapted from the German original by August von Kotzebue). Scandalized, he halts the play and burns the rehearsal scripts. Fanny Price is astonished that the play was ever thought appropriate, and considers the two leading female roles as "totally improper for home representation—the situation of one, and the language of the other so unfit to be expressed by any woman of modesty".

Claire Tomalin (1997) says that Mansfield Park, with its moralist theme and criticism of corrupted standards, has polarised supporters and critics. It opposes a vulnerable young woman with strong religious and moral principles against a group of worldly, cultivated, well-to-do young people who pursue their pleasure and profit without principle.

Jonas Barish, in his seminal work, The Antitheatrical Prejudice (1981), adopts the view that by 1814 Austen may have turned against theatre following a supposed recent embrace of evangelicalism. Austen certainly read and, to her surprise, enjoyed Thomas Gisborne's Enquiry into the Duties of the Female Sex, which stated categorically that theatricals were sinful, because of their opportunities for "unrestrained familiarity with persons of the other sex". She may well have read William Wilberforce's popular evangelical work that challenged the decadence of the time and also expressed strong views about theatre and its negative influence on morality.

However, Tomalin argues that Austen is not known to have condemned plays outside Mansfield Park. Austen was an avid theatregoer and a critical admirer of the great actors. In childhood her family had embraced the popular activity of home theatre. She had participated in full-length popular plays (several written by herself) performed in the family dining room at Steventon (and later in the barn), supervised by her clergyman father. Many elements observed by the young Austen during family theatricals are reworked in the novel, including the temptation of James, her recently ordained brother, by their flirtatious cousin Eliza.

Paula Byrne (2017) records that only two years before writing Mansfield Park, Austen had played with great aplomb the part of Mrs Candour in Sheridan's popular contemporary play The School for Scandal. Her correspondence shows that she and her family continued as enthusiastic theatre-goers. Byrne also argues that Austen's novels, particularly Mansfield Park, show considerable theatricality and dramatic structure which makes them particularly adaptable for screen representation. Calvo sees the novel as a rewrite of Shakespeare's King Lear and his three daughters, with Fanny as Sir Thomas's Regency Cordelia.

Eight chapters discuss anti-theatrical prejudice from shifting points of view. Edmund and Fanny find moral dilemmas, and even Mary is conflicted, insisting she will edit her script. However, theatre as such is never challenged. The questions about theatrical impropriety include the morality of the text, the effect of acting on vulnerable amateur players, and performance as an indecorous disruption in a respectable home. Fanny's anti-theatrical viewpoint goes back as far as Plato, and continued to find expression into the 20th century.

=== Impropriety ===
Austen's presentation of the intense debate about theatre tempts the reader to take sides and to miss the ambiguities. Edmund, the most critical voice, is actually an enthusiastic theatre-goer. Fanny, the moral conscience of the debate, "believed herself to derive as much innocent enjoyment from the play as any of them". She thought Henry the best actor of them all. She also delighted in reading Shakespeare aloud to her aunt Bertram.

Stuart Tave emphasises the challenge of the play as a test of the characters' commitment to propriety. The priggish Mrs. Norris sees herself as the guardian of propriety. She is trusted as such by Sir Thomas when he leaves for Antigua, but fails completely by allowing the preparation for Lovers' Vows. Edmund objects to the play, believing it somehow improper, but fails to articulate the problem convincingly. His intense objection to an outsider being brought in to share in the theatricals is not easy for the modern reader to understand. Mr Rushworth's view, that "we are a great deal better employed, sitting comfortably here among ourselves, and doing nothing", is affirmed only by Sir Thomas himself.

Fanny alone understands the depth of impropriety in what is proposed; she knows from her penetrating observations of the household that the acting will dangerously inflame the emotions of the actors, but she lacks the strength to persuade the others. During rehearsals, Fanny observes the ongoing flirtation between Henry and the about-to-be-married Maria, "Maria acted well, too well." She also sees the sexual tension and attraction between Edmund and Mary as they play the part of the two lovers. This fills her with misery but also jealousy. Later, Mary describes to Fanny her favorite episode, playing the dominant role of Amelia with Edmund as Anhalt, her besotted admirer. "I never knew such exquisite happiness ... Oh! it was sweet beyond expression."

Tave points out that, in shutting down Lovers' Vows, Sir Thomas is expressing his hidden hypocrisy and myopia. His concern is with an external propriety, not the principles that motivate moral behaviour. He is content to destroy the set and props without considering what had led his children to put on such a play. Only later does he come to understand his shortcomings as a parent.

=== Acting ===
Another classical anti-theatrical theme is the need for sincerity in everyday life, avoiding pretence and hypocrisy. Fanny is often criticised because she 'does not act', but beneath her timid surface is a solid core.

Henry Crawford, the life of any party, is constantly acting; he has many personas but no firm character or stable principles. Thomas Edwards says that even when Henry tries to please Fanny by denouncing acting during a discussion about Shakespeare, he is still performing. He measures his every word and carefully watches the reaction on her face. He is a man who constantly reinvents himself in the pattern of those around him: he considers a career as a minister after encountering Edmund, and as a sailor after meeting William. At Sotherton, Henry acts the part of a landscape improver, a role he later reprises for Thornton Lacey, though he lacks the consistency to manage effectively his own Norfolk estate. At the first suggestion of a theatre at Mansfield Park, Henry, for whom theatre was a new experience, declared he could undertake "any character that ever was written". Later still, in reading Henry VIII aloud to Lady Bertram, Henry impersonates one character after another, even impressing the reluctant Fanny with his skill. When Henry unexpectedly falls in love with Fanny, he enthusiastically acts out the part of devoted lover, but even the hopeful Sir Thomas recognises that the admirable Henry is unlikely to sustain his performance for long.

Edwards suggests that the inherent danger of Lovers' Vows for the young actors is that they cannot distinguish between acting and real life, a danger exposed when Mary says, "What gentleman among you am I to have the pleasure of making love to?"

=== Regency politics ===
David Selwyn argues that the rationale behind Austen's apparent anti-theatricality is not evangelicalism but its symbolic allusion to Regency political life. Mansfield Park is a book about the identity of England. Tom, whose lifestyle has imperilled his inheritance, and the playboy Henry are Regency rakes, intent on turning the family estate into a playground during the master's absence. If the Regent, during the King's incapacity, turns the country into a vast pleasure ground modelled on Brighton, the foundations of prosperity will be imperilled. To indulge in otherwise laudable activities like theatre at the expense of a virtuous and productive life leads only to unhappiness and disaster.

== Church and Mansfield Park ==
Following the publication of Pride and Prejudice, Austen wrote to her sister, Cassandra, mentioning her proposed Northamptonshire novel. "Now I will try to write of something else; it shall be a complete change of subject: Ordination." Trilling believed Austen was making ordination the subject of Mansfield Park; Byrne argues (as do others) that although this is based on a misreading of the letter, "there is no doubt that Edmund's vocation is at the centre of the novel". Decadence in the Georgian church had been seriously challenged over several decades by the emerging Methodist movement that had only recently seceded from the mother church, and also by the parallel Evangelical movement that stayed within it. Brodrick describes the Georgian church as "strenuously preventing women from direct participation in doctrinal and ecclesiastical affairs". However, disguised within the medium of the novel, Austen has succeeded in freely discussing Christian doctrine and church order, another example of subversive feminism.

=== Set pieces ===
In several set pieces, Austen presents debates about significant challenges for the Georgian church. She discusses clerical corruption, the nature of the clerical office and the responsibility of the clergyman to raise both spiritual awareness and doctrinal knowledge. Topics range from issues of personal piety and family prayers to problems of non-residence and decadence amongst the clergy. Dr Grant, who has the living at Mansfield, is portrayed as a self-indulgent clergyman with very little sense of his pastoral duties. Edmund, the young, naive, would-be ordinand, expresses high ideals, but needs Fanny's support both to fully understand and to live up to them.

Locations for these set pieces include the visit to Sotherton and its chapel where Mary learns for the first time (and to her horror) that Edmund is destined for the church; the game of cards where the conversation turns to Edmund's intended profession, including conversations about Thornton Lacey, Edmund's future 'living'.

=== Decadent religion ===
Austen often exposed clergy corruption through parody. Although Mary Crawford's arguments with Edmund Bertram about the church are intended to undermine his vocation, hers is the voice that constantly challenges the morality of the Regency church and clergy. Edmund attempts its defence without justifying its failures. On the basis of close observations of her brother-in-law, Dr Grant, Mary arrives at the jaundiced conclusion that a "clergyman has nothing to do, but be slovenly and selfish, read the newspaper, watch the weather and quarrel with his wife. His curate does all the work and the business of his own life is to dine."

In the conversation at Sotherton, Mary applauds the late Mr Rushworth's decision to abandon the twice daily family prayers, eloquently describing such practice as an imposition for both family and servants. She derides the heads of households for hypocrisy in making excuses to absent themselves from chapel. She pities the young ladies of the house, "starched up into seeming piety, but with heads full of something very different—specially if the poor chaplain were not worth looking at". Edmund acknowledges that long services can be boring but maintains that without self-discipline a private spirituality will be insufficient for moral development. Although Mary's view is presented as a resistance to spiritual discipline, there were other positive streams of spirituality that expressed similar sentiments.

Mary also challenges the widespread practice of patronage; she attacks Edmund's expectation for being based on privilege rather than on merit. Although Sir Thomas has sold the more desirable Mansfield living to pay off Tom's debts, he is still offering Edmund a guaranteed living at Thornton Lacey where he can lead the life of a country gentleman.

In the final chapter, Sir Thomas recognises that he has been remiss in the spiritual upbringing of his children; they have been instructed in religious knowledge but not in its practical application. The reader's attention has already been drawn to the root of Julia's superficiality during the visit to Sotherton when, abandoned by the others, she was left with the slow-paced Mrs Rushworth as her only companion. "The politeness which she had been brought up to practise as a duty made it impossible for her to escape." Julia's lack of self-control, of empathy, of self understanding and of "that principle of right, which had not formed any essential part of her education, made her miserable under it". She was a prisoner of duty, lacking the ability to appreciate either duty's humanity or its spiritual source.

=== Evangelical influence ===
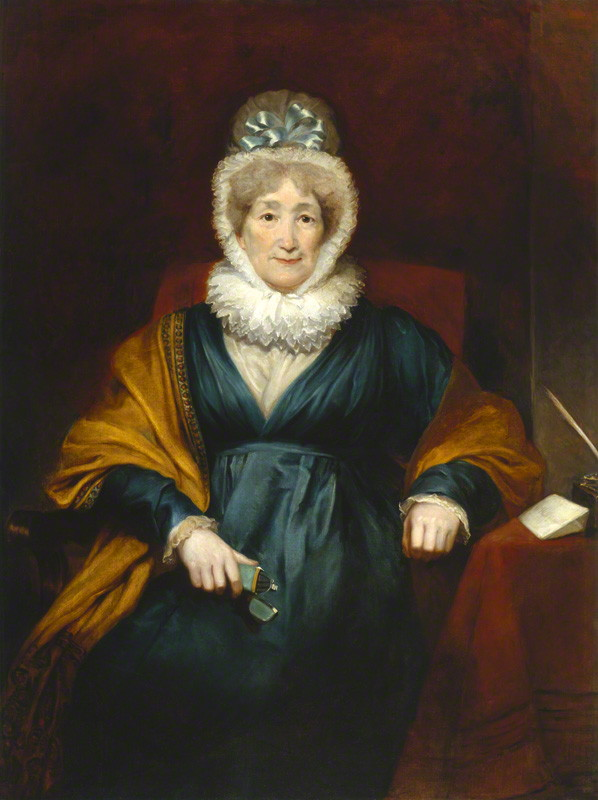
Hannah More, schoolteacher, abolitionist, member of the Evangelical Clapham Sect and philanthropist. Also a bestselling novelist, her writings, unlike Austen's, overtly promoted Christian faith and values.

To what extent Austen's views were a response to Evangelical influences has been a matter of debate since the 1940s. She would have been aware of the profound influence of Wilberforce's widely read Practical Christianity, published in 1797, and its call to a renewed spirituality. Evangelical campaigning at this time was always linked to a project of national renewal. Austen was deeply religious, her faith and spirituality very personal but, unlike contemporary writers Mary Wollstonecraft and Hannah More, she neither lectured nor preached. Many of her family were influenced by the Evangelical movement and in 1809 Cassandra recommended More's 'sermon novel', Coelebs in Search of a Wife. Austen responded, parodying her own ambivalence, "I do not like the Evangelicals. Of course I shall be delighted when I read it, like other people, but till I do, I dislike it." Five years later, writing to her niece Fanny, Austen's tone was different, "I am by no means convinced that we ought not all to be Evangelicals, and am at least persuaded that they who are so from Reason and Feeling, must be happiest and safest." Jane Hodge (1972) said, "where she herself stood in the matter remains open to question. The one thing that is certain is that, as always, she was deeply aware of the change of feeling around her." Brodrick (2002) concludes after extensive discussion that "Austen's attitude to the clergy, though complicated and full of seeming contradictions, is basically progressive and shows the influence of Evangelical efforts to rejuvenate the clergy, but can hardly be called overtly Evangelical".

=== Pulpit eloquence ===
In a scene in chapter 34 in which Henry Crawford reads Shakespeare aloud to Fanny, Edmund and Lady Bertram, Austen slips in a discussion on sermon delivery. Henry shows that he has the taste to recognise that the "redundancies and repetitions" of the liturgy require good reading (in itself a telling criticism, comments Brodrick). He offers the general (and possibly valid) criticism that a "sermon well-delivered is more uncommon even than prayers well read". As Henry continues, his shallowness and self-aggrandisement becomes apparent: "I never listened to a distinguished preacher in my life without a sort of envy. But then, I must have a London audience. I could not preach but to the educated, to those who were capable of estimating my composition." He concludes, expressing the philosophy of many a lazy clergyman, maintaining that he should not like to preach often, but "now and then, perhaps, once or twice in the spring". Although Edmund laughs, it is clear that he does not share Henry's flippant, self-centred attitude. Neither (it is implied) will Edmund succumb to the selfish gourmet tendencies of Dr Grant. "Edmund promises to be the opposite: an assiduous, but genteel clergyman who maintains the estate and air of a gentleman, without Puritanical self-denial and yet without corresponding self-indulgence."

Edmund recognises that there are some competent and influential preachers in the big cities like London but maintains that their message can never be backed up by personal example or ministry. Ironically, the Methodist movement, with its development of lay ministry through the "class meeting", had provided a solution to this very issue. There is only one reference to Methodism in the novel, and there it is linked, as an insult, with the modern missionary society. Mary in her angry response to Edmund as he finally leaves her, declares: "At this rate, you will soon reform every body at Mansfield and Thornton Lacey; and when I hear of you next, it may be as a celebrated preacher in some great society of Methodists, or as a missionary in foreign parts."

=== An ideal clergyman ===
When Mary learns at Sotherton that Edmund has chosen to become a clergyman, she calls it "nothing". Edmund responds, saying that he cannot consider as "nothing" an occupation that has the guardianship of religion and morals, and that has implications for time and for eternity. He adds that conduct stems from good principles and from the effect of those doctrines a clergyman should teach. The nation's behaviour will reflect, for good or ill, the behaviour and teaching of the clergy.

Rampant pluralism, where wealthy clerics drew income from several 'livings' without ever setting foot in the parish, was a defining feature of the Georgian church. In chapter 25, Austen presents a conversation during a card evening at Mansfield. Sir Thomas's whist table has broken up and he draws up to watch the game of Speculation. Informal conversation leads into an exposition of the country parson's role and duties. Sir Thomas argues against pluralism, stressing the importance of residency in the parish,

"... and which no proxy can be capable of satisfying to the same extent. Edmund might, in the common phrase, do the duty of Thornton, that is, he might read prayers and preach, without giving up Mansfield Park; he might ride over, every Sunday, to a house nominally inhabited, and go through divine service; he might be the clergyman of Thornton Lacey every seventh day, for three or four hours, if that would content him. But it will not. He knows that human nature needs more lessons than a weekly sermon can convey, and that if he does not live among his parishioners, and prove himself by constant attention their well-wisher and friend, he does very little either for their good or his own."

Sir Thomas conveniently overlooks his earlier plan, before he was forced to sell the Mansfield living to pay off Tom's debts, that Edmund should draw the income from both parishes. This tension is never resolved. Austen's own father had sustained two livings, itself an example of mild pluralism.

== Slavery and Mansfield Park ==
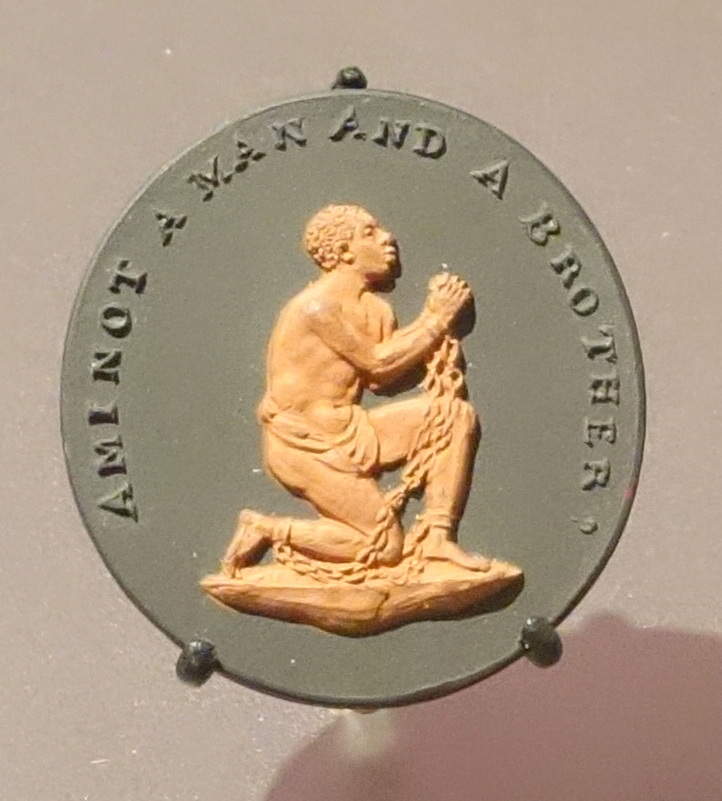
The Wedgwood medallion inscribed "Am I not a man and a brother", widely distributed amongst supporters of abolition.

Although not explicitly stated in the novel, allusions are made to the fact that Sir Thomas Bertram's home, the titular Mansfield Park, is built on the proceeds of his slave plantation in Antigua. It is not described as an old structure like Rushworth's Sotherton Court, or the estate homes described in Austen's other novels, like Pemberley in Pride and Prejudice or Donwell Abbey in Emma.

The Slave Trade Act (which abolished the slave trade) had been passed in 1807, four years before Austen started to write Mansfield Park, and was the culmination of a long campaign by British abolitionists, notably William Wilberforce and Thomas Clarkson. Slavery itself would not be abolished in the British Empire until 1833.

In chapter 21, when Sir Thomas returns from his estates in Antigua, Fanny asks him about the slave trade but receives no answer. The pregnant silence continues to perplex critics. Claire Tomalin, following the literary critic Brian Southam, argues that in questioning her uncle about the slave trade, the usually timid Fanny shows that her vision of the trade's immorality is clearer than his. Sheehan believes that "just as Fanny tries to remain a bystander to the production of Lovers' Vows but is drawn into the action, we the audience of bystanders are drawn into participation in the drama of Mansfield Park ... Our judgement must be our own."

It is widely assumed that Austen herself sympathised with the cause of abolitionists. In a letter to her sister, Cassandra, she compares a book she is reading with Clarkson's anti-slavery book, "I am as much in love with the author as ever I was with Clarkson". Austen's favourite poet, the Evangelical William Cowper, was also a passionate abolitionist who often wrote poems on the subject, notably his famous work The Task, also favoured by Fanny Price.

=== Analysis of slavery in Mansfield Park ===
In his 1993 book, Culture and Imperialism, the American literary critic Edward Said claimed Mansfield Park demonstrated Western culture's casual acceptance of the material benefits of slavery. He cited Austen's failure to mention that the estate of Mansfield Park was made possible only through Bertram's ownership of a slave plantation. Said argued that Austen created the character of Sir Thomas as the archetypal "good master", ignoring the immorality of slavery by failing to cast Bertram's ownership of slaves as a blight on his character. He accepted that Austen does not talk much about the plantation owned by Sir Thomas, but contended that Austen expected the reader to assume that the Bertram family's wealth was due to profits from the sugar produced by their enslaved workforce. Said further claimed that this reflected Austen's own assumption that such a fact was merely "a natural extension of the calm, the order, the beauties of Mansfield Park".

Paradoxically, Said acknowledged that Austen disapproved of slavery:

All the evidence says that even the most routine aspects of holding slaves on a West Indian sugar plantation were cruel stuff. And everything we know about Jane Austen and her values is at odds with the cruelty of slavery. Fanny Price reminds her cousin that after asking Sir Thomas about the slave trade, "there was such a dead silence" as to suggest that one world could not be connected with the other since there simply is no common language for both. That is true.

The Japanese scholar Hidetada Mukai noted the Bertrams were a nouveau riche family whose income depends on their plantation in Antigua. The abolition of the slave trade in 1807 had imposed a serious strain on the West Indian plantations. Austen may have been referring to this crisis when Sir Thomas leaves for Antigua to deal with unspecified problems on his plantation. Hidetada further argued that Austen made Sir Thomas a planter as a feminist attack on the patriarchal society of the Regency era, noting that Sir Thomas, though a kindly man, treats women, including his own daughters and his niece, as disposable commodities to be traded and bartered for his own advantage, and that this would be parallelled by his treatment of slaves who are exploited to support his lifestyle.

Said's thesis that Austen was an apologist for slavery was again challenged in the 1999 film based on Mansfield Park and Austen's letters. The Canadian director, Patricia Rozema, presented the Bertram family as morally corrupt and degenerate, in complete contrast to the book. Rozema invented numerous scenes not present in the book, including one where Fanny is travelling to the Bertram estate and hears the cries from Africans on board a slave ship off the coast. She asks her coachman what is happening. In addition, Fanny also condemns slavery in the film, unlike the book.

Gabrielle White also criticised Said's characterisation of Austen's views on slavery, maintaining that Austen and other writers admired by Austen, including Samuel Johnson and Edmund Burke, opposed slavery and helped make its eventual abolition possible. The Australian historian Keith Windschuttle argued that: "The idea that, because Jane Austen presents one plantation-owning character, of whom heroine, plot and author all plainly disapprove, she thereby becomes a handmaiden of imperialism and slavery, is to misunderstand both the novel and the biography of its author, who was an ardent opponent of the slave trade". Likewise, the British author Ibn Warraq accused Said of a "most egregious misreading" of Mansfield Park and condemned him for a "lazy and unwarranted reading of Jane Austen", arguing that Said had completely distorted Mansfield Park to give Austen views that she clearly did not hold.

=== English air ===
Margaret Kirkham points out that throughout the novel, Austen makes repeated references to the refreshing, wholesome quality of English air. In the 1772 court case Somerset v Stewart, where Lord Mansfield declared that an enslaved person could not be transported out of England against his will (something which was incorrectly interpreted by the British public to be explicitly outlawing slavery in England), one of the lawyers for James Somerset, the slave in the case, had said that "England was too pure an air for a slave to breathe in". He was citing a ruling from a court case in 1569 freeing a Russian slave brought to England. The phrase is developed in Austen's favourite poem:

I had much rather be myself the slave
And wear the bonds, than fasten them on him.
We have no slaves at home – then why abroad?
And they themselves, once ferried o'er the wave
That parts us, are emancipate and loosed.
Slaves cannot breathe in England; if their lungs
Receive our air, that moment they are free,
They touch our country and their shackles fall.

— William Cowper, "The Task", 1785

Austen's references to English air are considered by Kirkham to be a subtle attack upon Sir Thomas, who owns slaves on his plantation in Antigua, yet enjoys the "English air", oblivious of the ironies involved. Kirkham claimed Austen would have read Clarkson and his account of Lord Mansfield's ruling.

=== Anti-slavery allusions ===
Austen's subtle hints about the world beyond her Regency families can be seen in her use of names. The family estate's name clearly reflects that of Lord Mansfield, just as the name of the bullying Aunt Norris is suggestive of Robert Norris, "an infamous slave trader and a byword for pro-slavery sympathies".

The newly married Maria, now part of a family with a greater income than that of her father, gains her London home in fashionable Wimpole Street at the heart of London society, a region where several West Indian planters had established their town houses. This desirable residence is the former home of Lady Henrietta Lascelles whose husband's family fortune came from the notoriously irresponsible Henry Lascelles. Lascelles had enriched himself with the Barbados slave trade and had been a central figure in the South Sea Bubble disaster. His wealth had been used to build Harewood House in Yorkshire, landscaped by "Capability" Brown.

When William Price is commissioned, Lady Bertram requests that he bring her back a shawl "or maybe two" from the East Indies and "anything else that is worth having". Said interpreted this line as showing that the novel supports, or is indifferent towards, profiteering by Europeans in Asia. Others have pointed out that the indifference belongs to Lady Bertram and is in no sense the attitude of the novel, the narrator or the author.

== Propriety and morality ==
Propriety is a major theme of the novel, says Tave. Maggie Lane says it is hard to use words like propriety seriously today, with its implication of deadening conformity and hypocrisy. She believes that Austen's society put a high store on propriety (and decorum) because it had only recently emerged from what was seen as a barbarous past. Propriety was believed essential in preserving that degree of social harmony which enabled each person to lead a useful and happy life.

The novel puts propriety under the microscope, allowing readers to come to their own conclusions. Tave points out that while Austen affirms those like Fanny who come to understand propriety at its deeper and more humane levels, she mocks mercilessly those like Mrs. Norris who cling to an outward propriety, often self-righteously and without understanding. Early in the novel when Sir Thomas leaves for Antigua, Maria and Julia sigh with relief, released from their father's demands for propriety, even though they have no particular rebellion in mind. Decline sets in at Sotherton with a symbolic rebellion at the ha-ha. It is followed later by the morally ambiguous rebellion of play-acting with Lovers' Vows, its impropriety unmasked by Sir Thomas's unexpected return. Both these events are a precursor to Maria's later adultery and Julia's elopement.

'Propriety' can cover not only moral behaviour but also anything else a person does, thinks or chooses. What is 'proper' can extend to the way society governs and organises itself, and to the natural world with its established order. Repton, the landscape gardener (1806), wrote critically of those who follow fashion for fashion's sake "without inquiring into its reasonableness or propriety". That failure is embodied in Mr Rushworth who, ironically, is eager to employ the fashionable Repton for 'improvements' at Sotherton. Repton also expressed the practical propriety of setting the vegetable garden close to the kitchen.

The propriety of obedience and of privacy are significant features in the novel. The privacy of Mansfield Park, intensely important to Sir Thomas, comes under threat during the theatricals and is dramatically destroyed following the national exposure of Maria's adultery.

Disobedience is portrayed as a moral issue in virtually every crisis in the novel. Its significance lies not only within the orderliness of an hierarchical society. It symbolically references an understanding of personal freedom and of the human condition described by Milton as "man's first disobedience".

Face to face; enigmatic portrayal. Based on a silhouette from a 2nd ed. held by the National Portrait Gallery

=== Moral dialogue ===
Commentators have observed that Fanny and Mary Crawford represent conflicting aspects of Austen's own personality, Fanny representing her seriousness, her objective observations and sensitivity, Mary representing her wit, her charm and her wicked irony. Conversations between Fanny and Mary seem at times to express Austen's own internal dialogue and, like her correspondence, do not necessarily provide the reader with final conclusions. Responding in 1814 to her niece's request for help with a dilemma of love, she writes, "I really am impatient myself to be writing something on so very interesting a subject, though I have no hope of writing anything to the purpose ... I could lament in one sentence and laugh in the next." Byrne takes this as a reminder that readers should be very hesitant about extracting Austen's opinions and advice, either from her novels or her letters. For Austen, it was not the business of writers to tell people what to do. Even Fanny, when Henry demands she advise him on managing his estate, tells him to listen to his conscience: "We have all a better guide in ourselves, if we would attend to it, than any other person can be". In Mansfield Park, Austen requires the reader to make their own moral judgements. For some time after its publication, she collected readers' reactions to the novel. The reader's response is part of the story. Says Sheehan, "The finale of Mansfield Park is indeterminate, fully in the hands of the audience. Of all of Austen’s daring innovations in her works, in Mansfield Park she takes the ultimate risk."

=== Conscience and consciousness ===
Trilling took the view that uneasiness with the apparently simplistic moral framework of the novel marks its prime virtue, and that its greatness is 'commensurate with its power to offend'. Edwards discusses the competing attraction of those with lively personalities over against those with the more prosaic quality of integrity.

The attractive Crawfords are appreciated by fashionable society, their neighbours and the reader, yet they are marred by self-destructive flaws. Edmund and Fanny, essentially very ordinary people who lack social charisma, are a disappointment to some readers but have moral integrity. Edwards suggests that Austen could have easily entitled Mansfield Park, 'Conscience and Consciousness', since the novel's main conflict is between conscience (the deep sensitivity in the soul of Fanny and Edmund) and consciousness (the superficial self-centred sensations of Mary and Henry).

=== The Crawfords ===
Sheehan says that "the superficial Crawfords are driven to express strength by dominating others. There is in fact nothing ordinary about them or their devices and desires. They are not only themselves corrupted, but they are bent upon dominating the wills and corrupting the souls of others. Rich, clever, and charming, they know how to captivate their audience and "take in" the unsuspecting."

MacIntyre identifies the depiction of the Crawfords as Austen's preoccupation with counterfeits of the virtues within the context of the moral climate of her times, writing "the surface propriety of Henry and Mary Crawford, together with their elegance and charm, which do provide a disguise for morally uneducated passions, is apt to victimize others as well as themselves. Henry Crawford is the dissimulator par excellence. He boasts of his ability to act parts and in one conversation makes it clear that he takes being a clergyman to consist in giving the appearance of being a clergyman."

Henry is first attracted to Fanny when he realises she does not like him. He is obsessed with 'knowing' her, with achieving the glory and happiness of forcing her to love him. He plans to destroy her identity and remake her in an image of his own choosing. Following his initial failure, Henry finds himself unexpectedly in love with Fanny. The shallowness of Henry Crawford's feelings is finally exposed when, having promised to take care of Fanny's welfare, he is distracted by Mary's ploy to renew his contact in London with the newly married Maria. Challenged to arouse Maria afresh, he inadvertently sabotages her marriage, her reputation and, consequently, all hopes of winning Fanny. The likeable Henry, causing widespread damage, is gradually revealed as the Regency rake, callous, amoral and egoistical. Lane offers a more sympathetic interpretation: "We applaud Jane Austen for showing us a flawed man morally improving, struggling, growing, reaching for better things—even if he ultimately fails."

Social perceptions of gender are such that, though Henry suffers, Maria suffers more. And by taking Maria away from her community, he deprives the Bertrams of a family member. The inevitable reporting of the scandal in the gossip-columns only adds further to family misery.

Mary Crawford possesses many attractive qualities including kindness, charm, warmth and vivacity. However, her strong competitive streak leads her to see love as a game where one party conquers and controls the other, a view not dissimilar to that of the narrator when in ironic mode. Mary's narcissism results in lack of empathy. She insists that Edmund should abandon his clerical career because it is not prestigious enough. With feminist cynicism, she tells Fanny to marry Henry to 'pay off the debts of one's sex' and to have a 'triumph' at the expense of her brother.

Edwards concludes that Mansfield Park demonstrates how those who, like most people, lack a superabundance of wit, charm and wisdom, get along in the world. Those with superficial strength are ultimately revealed as weak; it is the people considered as 'nothing' who quietly triumph.

== Adaptations ==
- 1983: Mansfield Park, BBC series directed by David Giles, starring Sylvestra Le Touzel as Fanny Price, Bernard Hepton as Sir Thomas Bertram, Nicholas Farrell as Edmund Bertram and Anna Massey as Mrs Norris.
- 1987: Version and Diversion, a novel by Judith Terry retelling Mansfield Park through the eyes of a lady's maid named Jane Hartwell.
- 1997: Mansfield Park, a BBC Radio 4 adaptation dramatised in three parts by Elizabeth Proud, starring Hannah Gordon as Jane Austen, Amanda Root as Fanny, Michael Williams as Sir Thomas Bertram, Jane Lapotaire as Mrs Norris, Robert Glenister as Edmund Bertram, Louise Jameson as Lady Bertram, Teresa Gallagher as Mary Crawford and Andrew Wincott as Henry Crawford.
- 1999: Mansfield Park, film directed by Patricia Rozema, starring Frances O'Connor as Fanny Price and Jonny Lee Miller as Edmund Bertram (he also featured in the 1983 version, playing one of Fanny's brothers). This film alters several major elements of the story and depicts Fanny as a much stronger personality and makes her author of some of Austen's actual letters as well as her children's history of England. It emphasises Austen's disapproval of slavery.
- 2003: Mansfield Park, a radio drama adaptation commissioned by BBC Radio 4, starring Felicity Jones as Fanny Price, Benedict Cumberbatch as Edmund Bertram, and David Tennant as Tom Bertram.
- 2007: Mansfield Park, a television adaptation produced by Company Pictures and starring Billie Piper as Fanny Price and Blake Ritson as Edmund Bertram, was screened on ITV1 in the UK on 18 March 2007.
- 2011: Mansfield Park, a chamber opera by Jonathan Dove, with a libretto by Alasdair Middleton, commissioned and first performed by Heritage Opera, 30 July – 15 August 2011.
- 2012: Mansfield Park, stage adaptation by Tim Luscombe, produced by the Theatre Royal, Bury St Edmunds, toured the UK in 2012 and 2013.
- 2014: From Mansfield with Love, web series modernisation produced by Foot in the Door Productions began airing on YouTube
- 2016: Mount Hope: An Amish Retelling of Jane Austen's Mansfield Park, by Sarah Price
- 2017: Seeking Mansfield, a young adult retelling by novelist Kate Watson set in the theater scene of modern-day Chicago.[149]
- 2024: This Motherless Land, decolonial retelling by Nikki May alternating between Nigeria and England
