= Pierre-Jean Grosley =

French man of letters, local historian, travel writer and observer of social mores

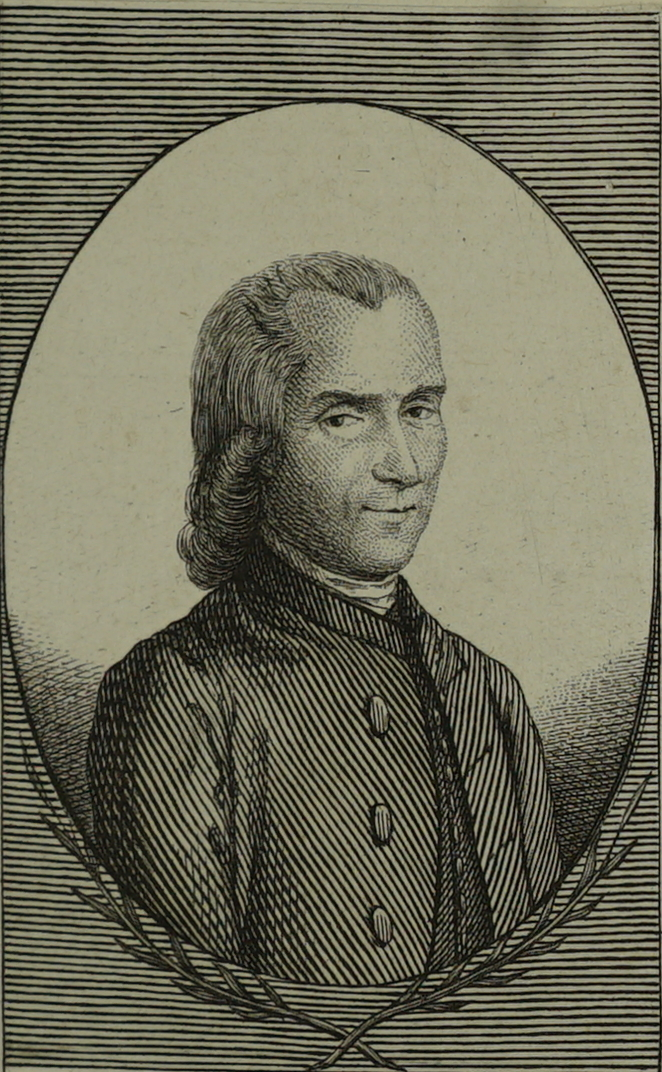
Pierre-Jean Grosley

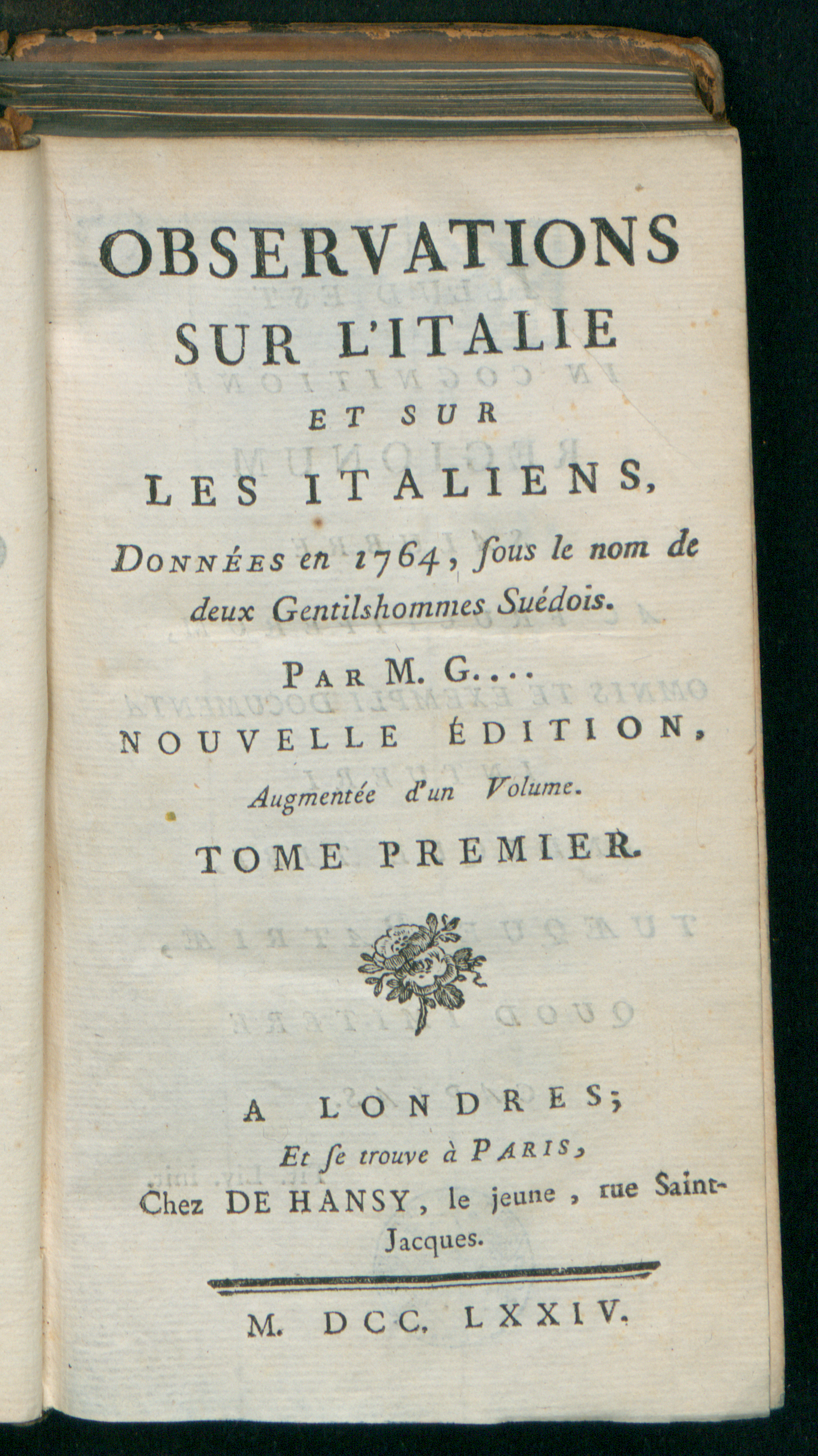
Observations sur l'Italie et sur les Italiens (1774)

Pierre-Jean Grosley (Troyes, 18 November 1718 – Troyes, 4 November 1785) was a French man of letters, local historian, travel writer and observer of social mores in the Age of Enlightenment and a contributor to the Encyclopédie ou Dictionnaire raisonné des sciences, des arts et des métiers.

Grosley was a magistrate in his native Troyes, where he had plenty of opportunity to hear the local dialect, which he described in a paper (1761). At the time of his death he was engaged in publishing Mémoires historiques et critiques pour l'histoire de Troyes ("Historic and critical notes for the history of Troyes") of which only the first complete volume was printed (Paris 1774).

Grosley accumulated some medieval manuscripts in the course of his researches. A manuscript of the chanson de geste Garin le Loherain with Garey's inscription was part of the Phillipps collection and is now conserved in the Bancroft Library, University of California at Berkeley.

Following his sojourn in Italy as the military administrator of the maréchal de Maillebois during the War of Austrian Succession, he published his Observations sur l'Italie et les Italiens.

He came in second in the competition ordered by the Académie de Dijon in 1750, which was won by Jean-Jacques Rousseau with his Discours sur les sciences et les arts. In 1752 he published his Recherches pour servir à l'histoire du droit françois; the essay, maintaining the Gaulish origin of French customary law, is divided in three sections: the first presents arguments to show that Gaul was least Romanised in the north; the second that French customs did not have their origins in the anarchic feudal conditions of the tenth and eleventh centuries; the third, that the Roman law did not prevail north of the Loire.

Grosley was elected an associate of the Académie royale des inscriptions et belles-lettres in 1761.

Following a year in London in 1765 he produced tart observations on the English style of life, with critical attention to the telling details that revealed for him the English character. His Londres (Neuchâtel 1770), was translated by Thomas Nugent and published in 2 volumes by Lockyer Davis in 1772 under the title A Tour to London; Or New Observations on England and its Inhabitants, by M. Grosley. It was read with pleasure by the English themselves. Like the London view of William Hogarth or the London Diary of that inveterate slummer James Boswell, Grosley presents a wry and satirical series of portraits of London street life from the fashionable walkers in a rainy, soot-laden St. James's Park to the bizarre holiday capers of butchers' boys and milkmaids. Among other things it contained the first published mention of that English invention, the sandwich. In 1766 Grosley was elected a Fellow of the Royal Society.

Grosley was a contributor to volumes IV and XIV of the Encyclopédie of Diderot and d'Alembert. His New Observations on Italy and its Inhabitants was published in London, 1764.

Francesca Wilson wrongly referred to him in Strange Island (1955) as Jean-Paul Grosley, and Nikolaus Pevsner repeated this error in the published text of his Reith Lectures, The Englishness of English Art (1956).

In Troyes, rue Pierre-Jean-Grosley commemorates his name.

== Publications ==
- Londres, Neuchâtel, Société Typographique, 1770–1771, 3 vol; in-12° (reprinted in Lausanne, 1774, 4 vol. in-12°;
- Mémoires de l'Académie des Sciences, Inscriptions, Belles-Lettres, Beaux-Arts, etc., nouvellement établie à Troyes. Liège (Troyes), 1744, in-8°; Paris, 1756. 2 vol. in-12; (Troyes), 1768, in-12; Londres (Troyes), an X; ouvrage fait en collaboration avec ses amis Lefèvre et David.
- Mémoire pour servir de supplément aux antiquités ecclésiastiques de Troyes, par M. N. Camusat.Troyes, 1750, in-12, reprinted several times;
- Recherches pour servir à l'histoire du Droit français, Paris, 1752, in-12;
- Vie de Pierre Pithou, etc. Paris, 1756, 2 vol. in-12;
- Ephémérides troyennes (1757–1768), Troyes, 12 vol. in-32;
- Nouveaux Mémoires ou observations sur l'Italie et sur les Italiens, par deux gentilshommes suédois, Londres, 1764, 3 vol. in-12; 1770, 5 vol. in-12; Londres, Lausanne, 1770, 3 vol. in-12; 1774, 4 vol. in-12;
- Mémoires sur les campagnes d'Italie de 1745 et 1746, Amsterdam, 1777, in-8°;
- Vie de M. Grosley, écrite par lui-même, etc., Londres et Paris, 1787, in-8°;
- Mémoires historiques et critiques pour l'histoire de Troyes, Troyes, 1811–1812, 2 vol. in-8°;
- Œuvres inédites {Mémoires sur les Troyens célèbres et Voyage en Hollande), Paris, 1813, 3 vol. in-8° (Le voyage en Hollande constitutes the 3e volume).
- L'art de battre sa maîtresse réédition Le Cherche-Midi- 2014

Grosley a publié une foule d'autres travaux biographiques, littéraires et historiques, dont une partie est insérée dans les journaux du temps.
