= John Millan =

English printer and bookseller (1701–1784)

John Millan (1701–1782) was a printer and bookseller at Charing Cross, London. After his death, his business was taken over by Thomas Egerton and his brother John Egerton.

From: The Booksellers, Henry Dell, 1766.

MILLAN deserving of the warmest praise,
As full of worth and virtue as of days;
Brave, open, gen'rous, 'tis in him we find,
A solid judgment, and a taste refined.
Nature's most choice productions are his care,
And them t'obtain no cost or pains does spare,
A character so amiable and bright,
Inspires the Muse with rapture and delight:

The Gentleman and Tradesman both in him unite.

On 5 March 1772, antiquarian Richard Gough visited Millan's shop. He wrote, "On my return from Westminster last night, I penetrated the utmost recesses of Millan's shop". He found Millan "at the head of a Whist party".

A newspaper death notice of 23 March 1782 reads, "Yesterday died, at his house at Charing-cross, aged 81, Mr Millan, military bookseller, supposed to have been the strongest man in the kingdom."

== Publications ==
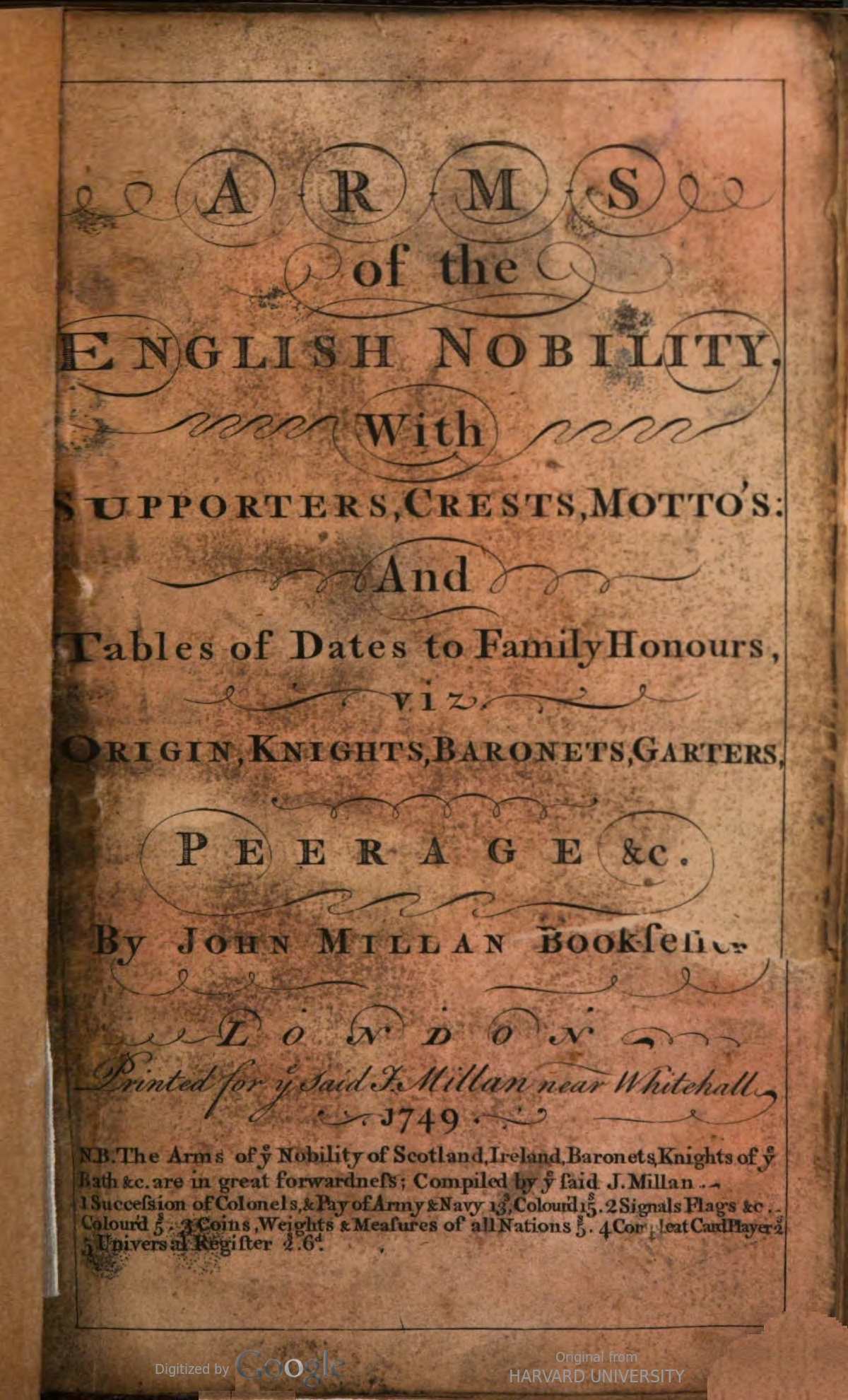
Title page of 'Arms of the English Nobility', John Millan, 1749.

- Millan's Lists of the Parliament. Containing The Lords with their Posts, ... Counties, Cities, etc., their members, etc, 1748
- Arms of the English Nobility: With Supporters, Crests, Motto's: and Tables of Dates to Family Honours, Viz. Origin, Knights, Baronets, Garters, Peerage &c., 1749
- Millan's Universal Register: Correct and Complete for 1750.

== Family ==
John Millan and his wife, Mary, had a daughter, Charity, born 16 January 1728, St. James, Westminster. Charity Millan married Edward Egerton on 29 July 1762 in St Martins in the Fields, Middlesex.

Edward and Charity Egerton had a daughter, Mary, born on 19 April 1764 and baptised 26 April 1764 at St Martins in the Fields. She was an author who published several books. She was the second wife of Thomas Scott, and, after his death, the first wife of astronomer William Rutter Dawes. She is mentioned on Dawes' grave as Mrs Thomas Scott. She died in 1840.

Their son, Millan Egerton, was born 8 October 1765, baptised at St John the Evangelist, Smith Square, Westminster, 3 November 1765. Millan Egerton became a First Lieutenant in the Royal Regiment of Artillery in May 1790. He died on 3 October 1790.
