= Lockyer John Davis =

Lockyer John Davis (1717–1791) was a bookseller and printer for the Royal Society. He was baptised at St Bartholomew-the-Great, London, on 14 November 1717. He was apprenticed to his uncle, Charles Davis, a bookseller, in 1732 and elected to the livery of the Worshipful Company of Stationers in 1746.

He was in partnership with Charles Reymers, who died in April 1769.

He married Mary Reimers in 1746 at St Dunstan in the West, London. Their daughter, Mary Davis, married bookseller John Egerton on 11 October 1783 in Westminster. John Egerton was the business partner of Thomas Egerton.

Davis died in Holborn in 1791.
