= Thomas Egerton (publisher) =

English bookseller and publisher

Thomas Egerton was a bookseller and publisher in Whitehall, London c. 1750–1830. With his brother and business partner John Egerton he took over the enterprise established by John Millan. For some years Egerton's office stood on Charing Cross. Books published included works by Jane Austen.

The brothers were also well-known auctioneers, selling the collections of men such as John Smeaton, Lemuel Dole Nelme, Francis Blackburne, the particularly large library of the actor John Henderson, and "perhaps the largest English eighteenth century collection of coins and medals sold at auction ... that of Thomas Allen Barnard on 20-23 April 1789".

Thomas Egerton died on 26 August 1830, in his 81st year, described as "of Whitehall".

John Egerton married Mary Davis, daughter of bookseller Lockyer John Davis, on 11 October 1783 in Westminster. He died on 17 January 1795.

== Works Published by John and Thomas Egerton ==
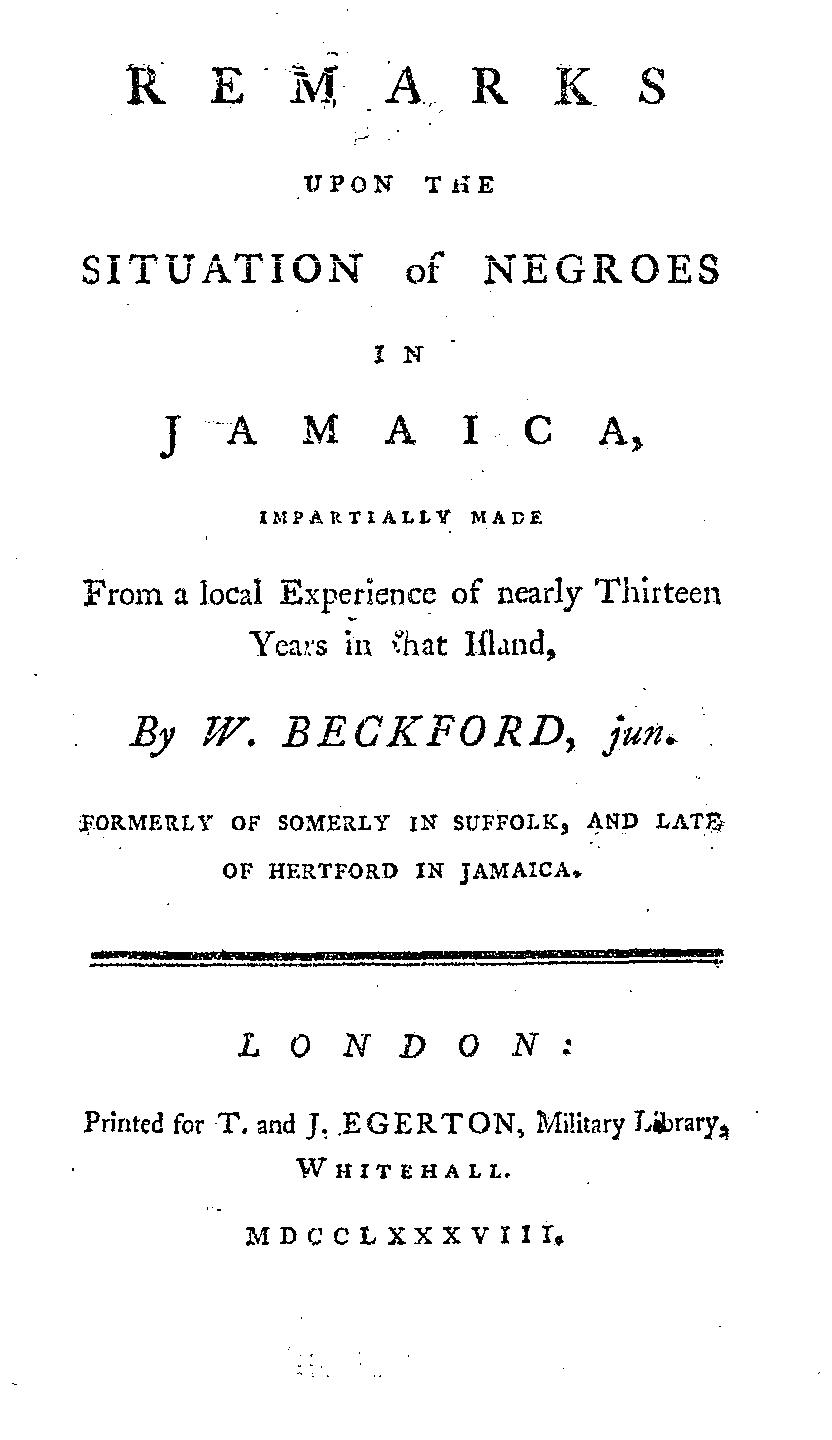
Title page of Remarks upon the situation of Negroes in Jamaica, 1788 by William Beckford, jun. Printed for T and J Egerton.

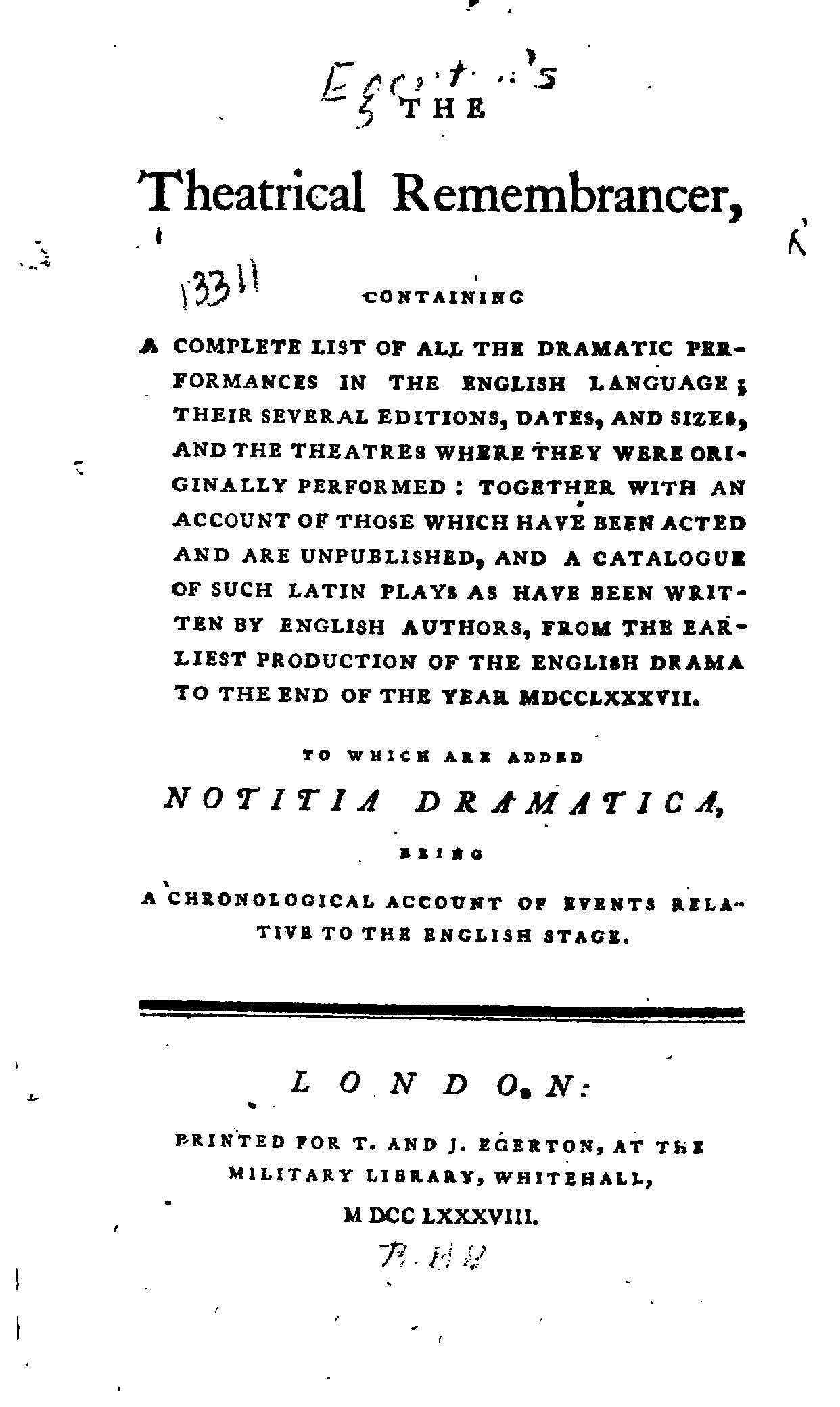
Title page of Egerton's Theatrical Remembrancer, 1788. Printed for T and J Egerton.

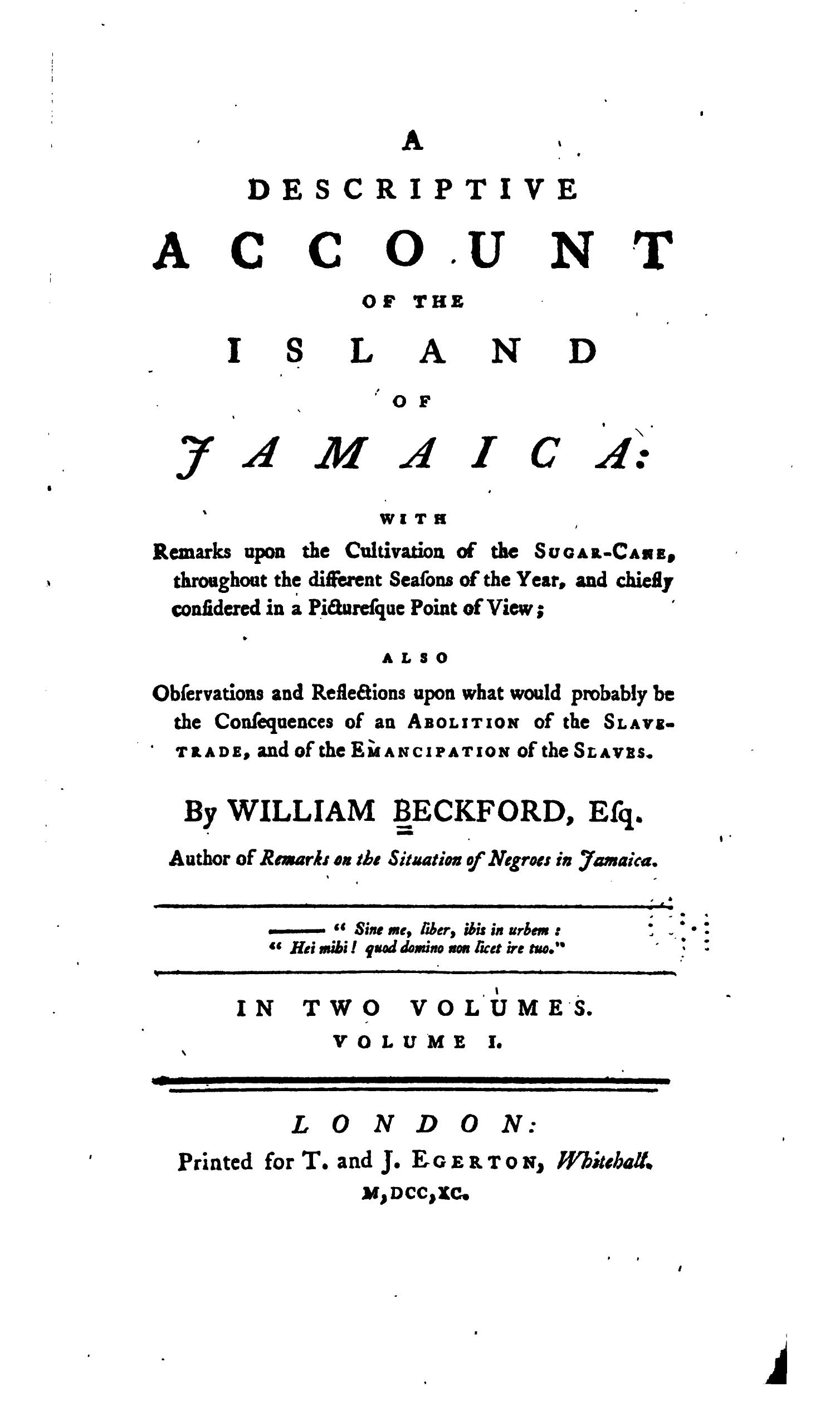
Title page of A descriptive account of the island of Jamaica, Volume 1, 1790 by William Beckford. Printed for T and J Egerton.

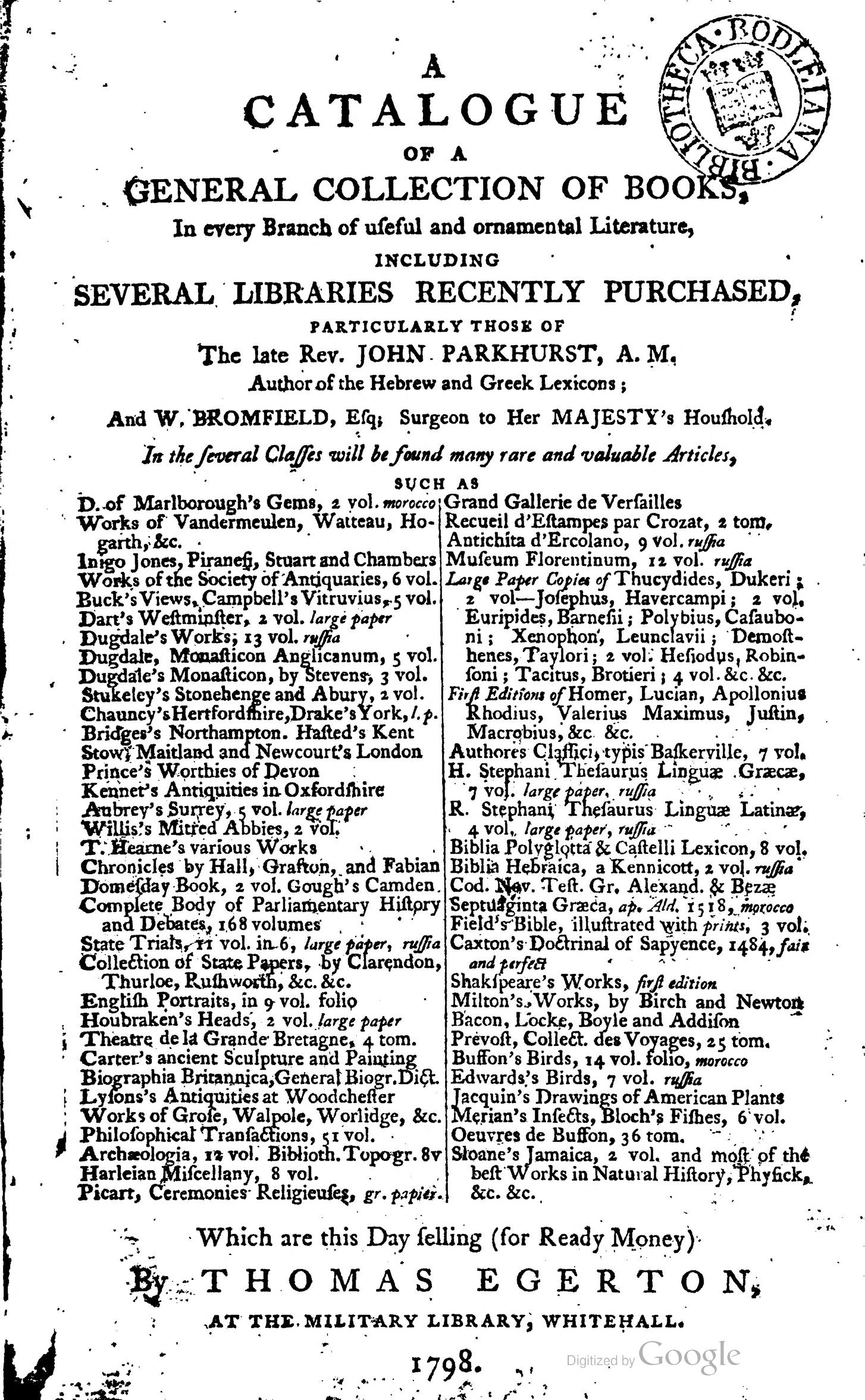
Title page of Thomas Egerton's book catalogue of 1798

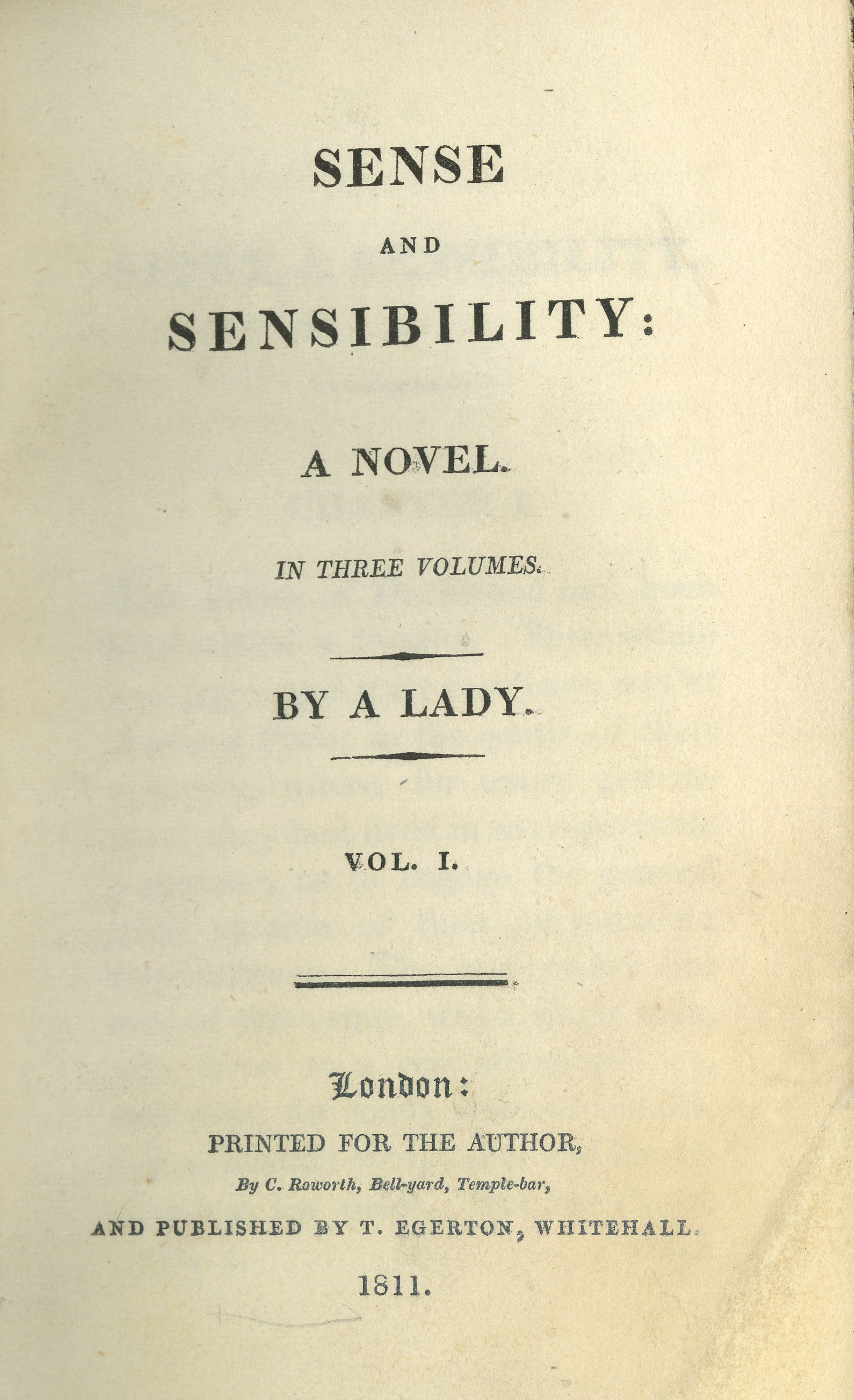
Title page of first edition of Sense and Sensibility by Jane Austen, 1811. Published by Thomas Egerton
