= Jane Austen's literary universe =

Setting of works by Jane Austen

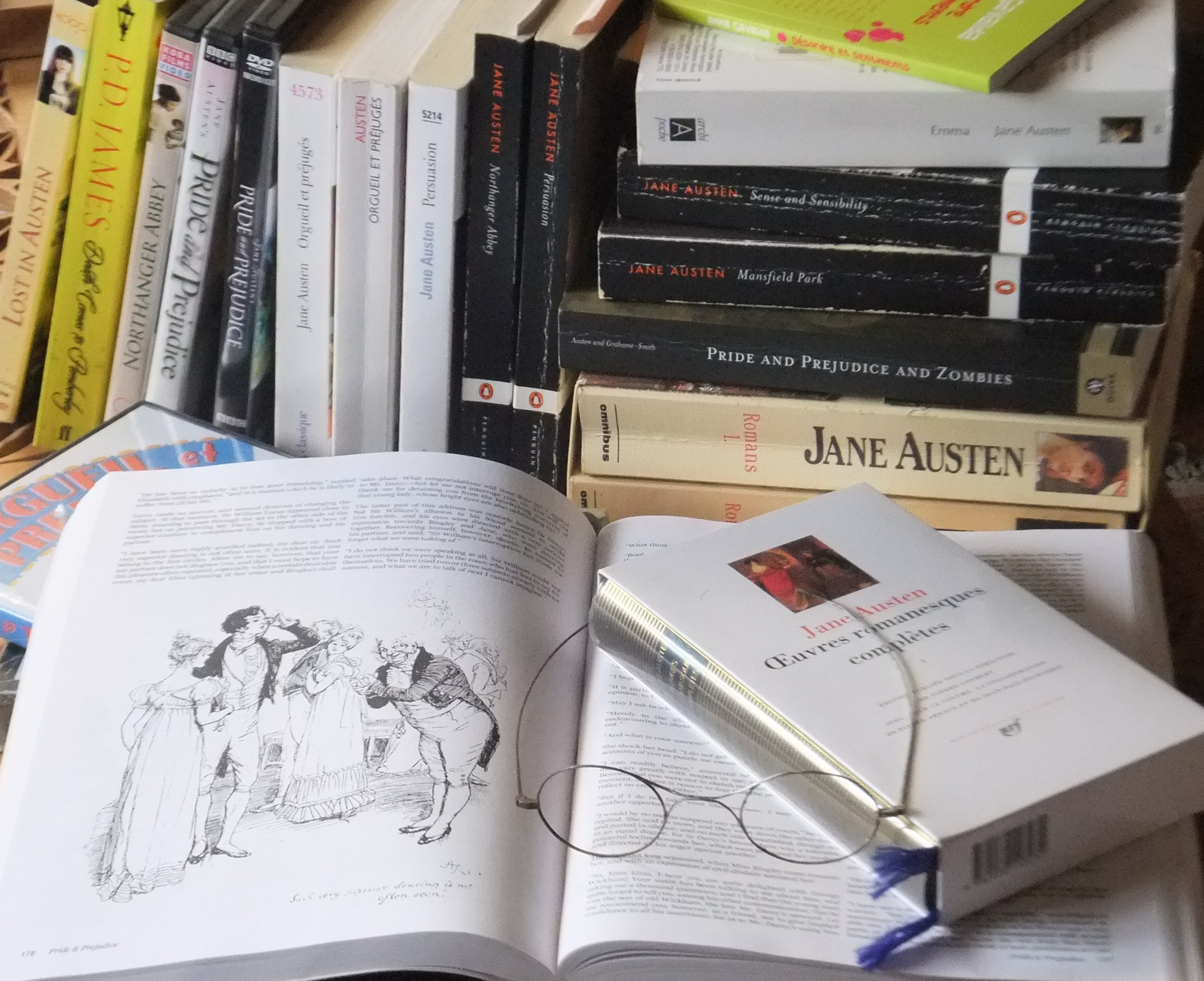
Jane Austen's six novels, illustrated, translated, adapted, sources of derivative works

Jane Austen's literary universe includes historical, geographical, and sociological aspects specific to the period and regions of England in which her novels are set. Since the second half of the 20th century, a growing body of research has focused not only on the literary qualities of these novels but also on their historical background, analyzing their economic and ideological aspects and highlighting the relevance of Jane Austen's works in these areas.

Signing of Jane Austen's will

On the other hand, a veritable cult has gradually grown up around the writer and her work, initially in the English-speaking world, but now spreading beyond it, and popular culture has taken hold of the universe she created. Jane Austen wrote for her contemporaries, unfolding her plots within the relatively narrow framework of the world she knew and lived in, but Georgette Heyer drew inspiration from her to invent the “Regency” romance novel in 1935. Since the second third of the 20th century, theatrical adaptations, followed by film and television, have brought her paper characters to life, with different interpretations depending on the era in which they were staged. "Contemporary” works, such as Bridget Jones's Diary, have taken up and transposed her plots; prequels and sequels have been invented around her characters by admirers, such as John Kessel and P. D. James, or romance writers; and the phenomenon has grown with the Internet and online sites.

As with Charles Dickens (Note: In addition to the Charles Dickens Museum in London, there's a Dickens World theme park in Chatham.) and the Brontë sisters, the cult of her person and work has given rise to a flourishing industry: Bath, in particular with its Jane Austen Centre, and Chawton, home to Jane Austen's House Museum, keep her memory alive. Tour operators organize tours around the places she frequented, and a special kind of tourism has been created in the regions and around the English Heritage homes where film and TV adaptations of her novels are shot.

== Jane Austen's novels ==
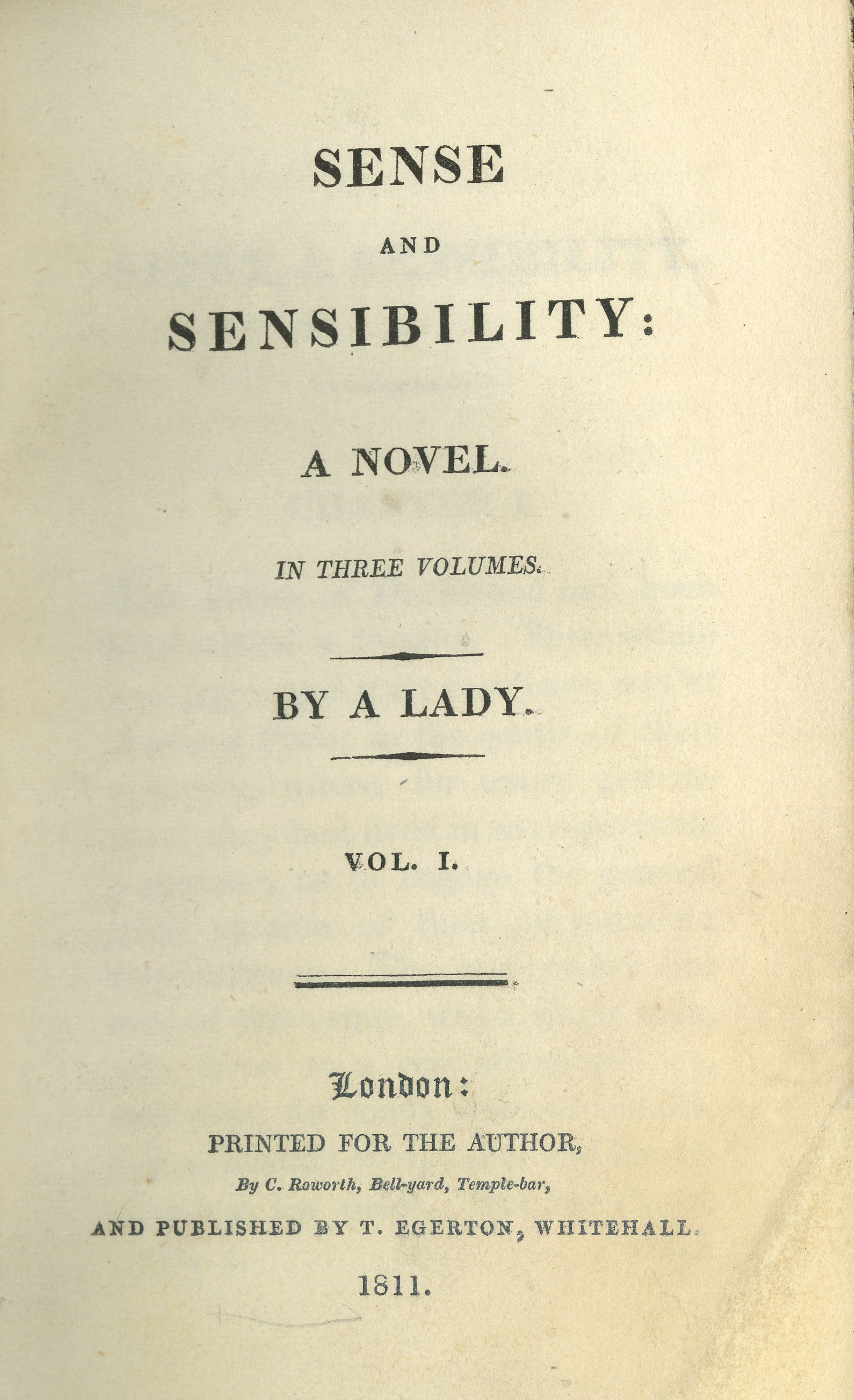
Title page from the first edition of Sense and Sensibility in 1811: a novel in three volumes, “by a Lady”.

=== The texts ===
In addition to her early works, grouped under the title Juvenilia, which remained unpublished until 1954, a parody play Sir Charles Grandison, or, The happy man: a comedy in five acts and a short epistolary novel, Lady Susan, Jane Austen left six novels, four of which appeared anonymously during her lifetime.

- Elinor and Marianne, an epistolary novel written in 1795, reworked in 1798 and 1811 for publication (on a self-publishing basis) as Sense and Sensibility.
- First Impressions, written between 1796 and 1797 (she was 21-22), revised in 1811, published in January 1813 as Pride and Prejudice.
- Mansfield Park, begun October 1812, published August 1814.
- Emma, begun in May 1814, completed in August 1815, published in December of the same year.

Northanger Abbey, written between 1798 and 1799, and Persuasion, completed in August 1816 while Jane Austen was already seriously ill, were published posthumously by her brother Henry in December 1817. These publications included a “Biographical Notice of the Author,” which revealed her identity as the author. It is likely that Austen did not choose the titles herself: Northanger Abbey was originally titled Susan in 1803 when she sold the rights to Crosby, and later referred to as Catherine in her correspondence with her sister Cassandra. Similarly, Persuasion was initially mentioned as The Elliots in her letters.

Several of Austen’s other works remained unpublished for many years. Lady Susan, an early epistolary novel (with the exception of a brief conclusion), was likely written in 1793 or 1794, when Austen was 18 or 19 years old. A clean, undated copy of the manuscript, probably from 1805, (Note: The novel was written on paper dated 1803.) survives, but the novel was not published until 1871, following the release of A Memoir of Jane Austen by her nephew James Edward Austen-Leigh. Similarly, The Watsons, a novel begun in Bath in 1803 but abandoned after her father’s death in 1805, remained incomplete and unpublished during her lifetime. Her final work, started in January 1817 but left unfinished after approximately 50 pages by March of that year, was published posthumously in 1925 under the title Sanditon.

The surviving manuscripts are housed in multiple locations, including the Bodleian Library in Oxford, the British Library in London, King's College in Cambridge, and the Pierpont Morgan Library in New York. However, they have been compiled into a digital collection: Jane Austen's Fiction Manuscripts Digital Edition. As was common practice at the time, drafts and finalized manuscripts of published works were not preserved.

=== Backgrounds ===
Jane Austen wrote for around twenty years (1795-1817), interrupted by a few years (1805-1809) after the death of her father. The period between the 18th and 19th centuries was a troubled one, with her country at almost constant war with France. It was also a period of profound economic change, with the influence of the traditional landed aristocracy waning in favor of new social classes, enriched by the Industrial Revolution, big business and the Napoleonic wars. This socio-economic context is reflected in her work: Pride and Prejudice (first written in 1796-1797) features characters from the textile bourgeoisie of northern England (the Bingleys) and from London's big business (the Gardiners); Mansfield Park (written in 1812-1813) and Persuasion (completed in 1816) show the social rise of Royal Navy officers, Lieutenant William Price and above all Captain Frederick Wentworth.

Moreover, her family attests to her habit of regularly returning to her manuscripts and amending them, starting a new novel while she was proofreading the previous one, or even “recycling” her texts that remained in manuscript. This explains the impression that her novels constantly take up the same themes, essentially marriage and money, refining them or studying them from another angle: elements of the abandoned novel The Watsons can be found in Mansfield Park, in Emma and perhaps in Pride and Prejudice. The dates of publication create unexpected links between them: her last completed novel, Persuasion, appeared at the same time as one of her earliest (written in 1797-1798), and Sanditon appears as a sequel to Northanger Abbey, although twenty years separate them. (Note: According to family tradition, the Heywoods were to play the same role in Sanditon as the Morlands did in Northanger Abbey.)

== Historical aspects ==
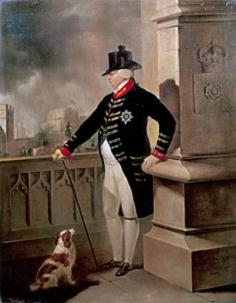
Peter Edward Stroehling's 1807 painting of “Farmer King” George III, at the height of his popularity before sinking into madness.

Jane Austen's entire life (1775-1817) took place during the reign of George III (1760-1820), and her entire body of work is set in the second half of that reign, and in particular during the regency of his son (1811-1820), the “Prince Regent”.

The plots of her novels are based on the daily life of the small country gentry, a group to which she belonged and which she depicted in her writings, providing information about the routines of this social segment at a time when the country, having lost its American colonies, was engaged in the Napoleonic wars. Against this historically troubled backdrop, in the midst of the Industrial Revolution, her novels shed light on social hierarchy, the role of the clergy, the status of women, marriage and the leisure activities of the wealthy class. Without the reader always being fully aware of it, many details of everyday life, forgotten legal aspects or customs that have since fallen into disuse are evoked, bringing to life this period in the history of English society known as Georgian society, and more specifically the Regency era.

However, Jane Austen's vision of England is portrayed exclusively from the point of view of a petite gentry woman living in a rigidly patriarchal society around 1800. Belonging to a well-to-do, highly educated and well-connected family, she has insights into many areas, but good manners prevent her from broaching certain subjects. As a result, certain key historical aspects of the time – such as the loss of the American colonies, the French Revolution, the Industrial Revolution underway, the birth of the British Empire – are largely absent from her works, which focus instead on the daily life of rural England during her era. For Karl Kroeber, professor at Columbia University, Jane Austen possesses a true historical vision: (Note: In 1990, in “Jane Austen as an Historical Novelist” , he uses the metaphor of the electron microscope (“The electron microscope is the best metaphor for Jane Austen’s method”) to illustrate how her keen observation can “reveal the truly significant, because underlying, changes that characterize the society of her time” (“I suggest that Austen’s attention to seemingly trivial features of the most ordinary girls getting married in small country villages is a technique for revealing the truly significant, because underlying, changes that characterize the society of her day”).) by focusing on the minutiae of the lives of ordinary damsels awaiting marriage in “a small country village”, by concentrating on tiny, seemingly unimportant events, she highlights the significant changes taking place between 1795 and 1816 at the deepest level of the society of her time.

== Geographical aspects ==
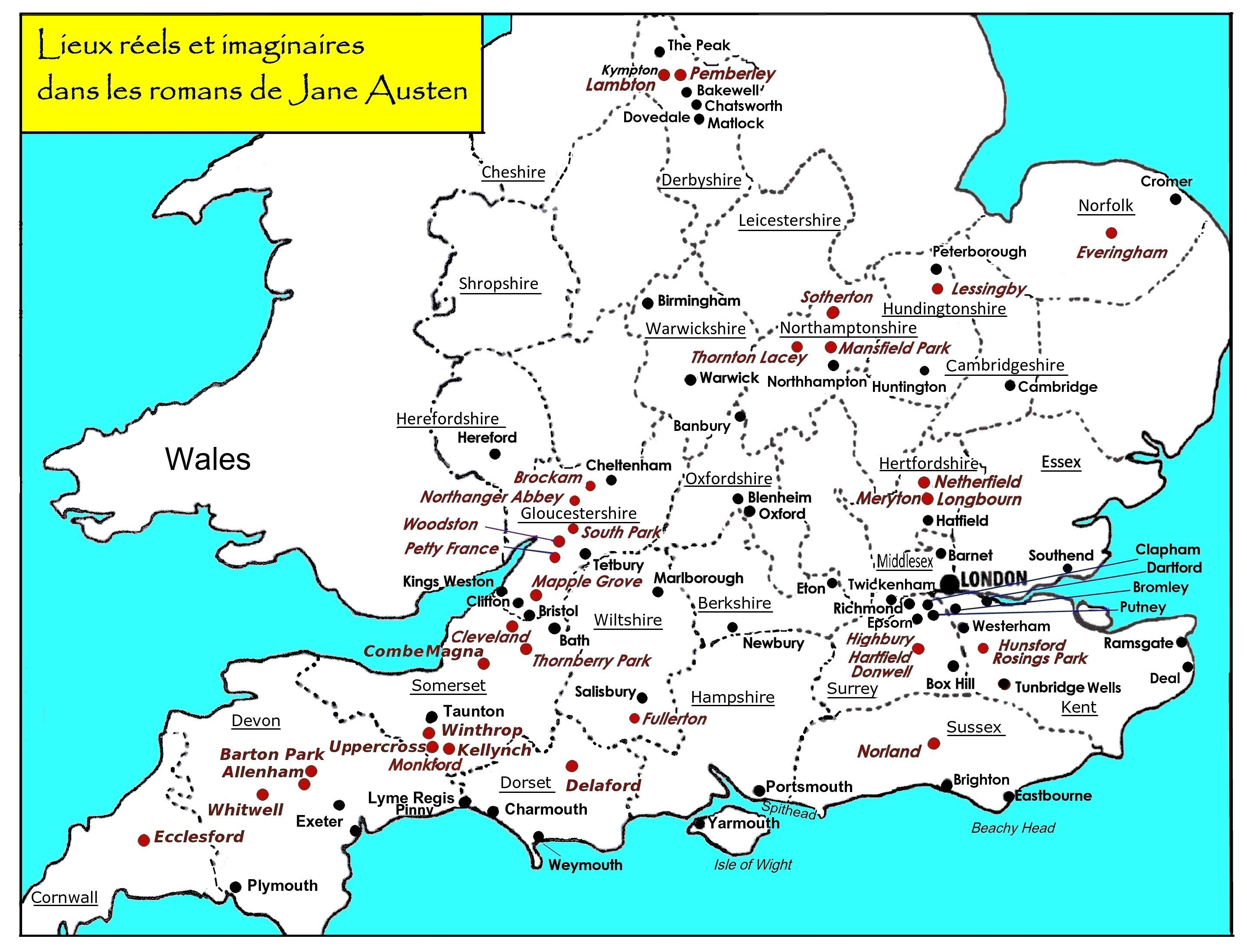
Map of England, showing the real places frequented by one or other of the characters in Jane Austen's six novels (in black) and the imaginary places where they live (in red and italics).

The locations where the characters live and the places they visit during their travels provide a precise glimpse into Jane Austen’s world, even though she rarely describes landscapes or settings in detail, leaving much to the reader’s imagination. Her stories are set in a relatively confined area, primarily the southern half of England, with the exception of Northamptonshire, where she situates Sir Bertram’s estate. Most of these regions were familiar to Austen personally. However, other locations are also referenced by the characters, such as Antigua in Mansfield Park, India in Sense and Sensibility, Scotland (including Gretna Green) and Northumberland (including Newcastle) in Pride and Prejudice, Ireland in Emma, and the Azores, Cape Town, and Gibraltar in Persuasion. The use of real place names enhances the sense of realism and authenticity in her novels.

=== Counties of England ===
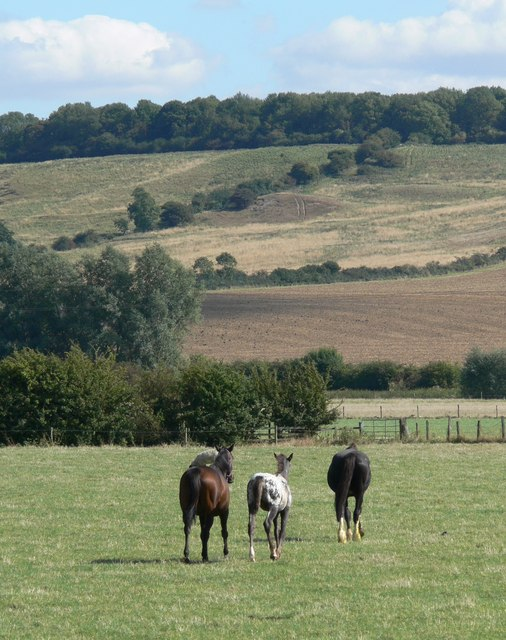
Northamptonshire was famous for its rolling countryside, ideal for horseback riding and foxhunting.

Travel was a common practice among the idle gentry, who frequently visited friends and relatives. Jane Austen herself traveled to visit her brother Edward in Godmersham, Kent, in 1798 and stayed with various family members after her father's death, before settling in Chawton in 1809. However, in keeping with the Conduct Novel tradition, journeys in her works carry strong symbolic significance. Her heroines undergo transformative experiences, encountering unfamiliar places and social circles that challenge their perspectives. With the exception of Emma Woodhouse, who remains in her native Surrey, (Note: But if Emma's life is confined to a narrow perimeter around Highbury, other characters are frequently on the move.) all embark on journeys that are simultaneously geographical, emotional, social, and moral.

Travel across different English counties and to London is a recurring theme, with four novels beginning with a departure from the family home, permanent in Sense and Sensibility, Mansfield Park, and Persuasion:

- The Dashwood girls abandon a comfortable life in the Sussex of their childhood to move to faraway Devon;
- Fanny Price, a shy and affectionate ten-year-old, is transplanted from a working-class district of Portsmouth, in southern Hampshire, to a large Northamptonshire estate, Mansfield Park, where she is treated like a poor relation;
- Anne Elliot has to leave Kellynch Hall in Somerset, her family's ancestral estate now rented out to strangers, and her travels underline her ability to adapt to extremely different social communities: after some time at Kellynch Lodge, rented by Lady Russell, she goes to Uppercross to keep her sister Mary company; the impromptu escapade at Lyme Regis in Dorset, then the stay in Bath, play a major role in the plot and the denouement.
- Catherine Morland, the daughter of a wealthy Wiltshire clergyman, is content with an eleven-week absence that occupies virtually the entire novel: she accompanies family friends to Bath (in Somerset), then is invited to Northanger Abbey in Gloucestershire. At 17, she discovers the world and matures in contact with Henry and Eleanor Tilney.
- As for Elizabeth Bennet, who spends most of the novel in Hertfordshire, she makes two decisive journeys: a spring sojourn of a few weeks in Kent, then a summer trip to Derbyshire that takes her to Pemberley.

=== Landscapes ===
Jane Austen's descriptions of landscapes are generally neither highly developed nor unprovoked. Virginia Woolf points out that “nature and its beauties she approached in a sidelong way of her own”. As with other women writers of the period, the descriptions reveal the state of mind of the character who wrote them, or have a symbolic meaning.

==== Picturesque landscape ====
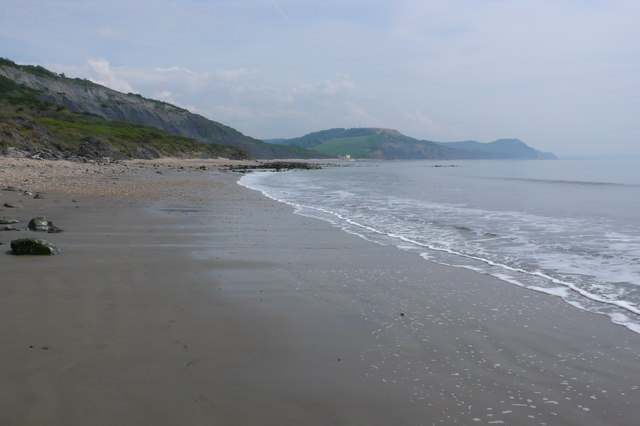
The coast at low tide between Lyme and Charmouth

The picturesque tour, popularized by travel guides often illustrated with etchings such as those by the Reverend William Gilpin, had become fashionable alongside the rise of tourism. (Note: As the war prevented the traditional Tour of Europe, Wales, the North of England and Scotland were the new fashionable destinations, with visits to castles and spa towns.) For this reason, Jane Austen found it unnecessary to describe in detail the famous locations visited by Elizabeth Bennet, and thoroughly documented elsewhere. (Note: A. Walton Litz points out that the route taken by Elizabeth and the Gardiners is exactly that followed by Gilpin in the first four chapters of his Observations.) It is only in Persuasion that Austen frequently emphasizes the beauty and melancholy of nature, (Note: Original Virginia Woolf Citation: « She dwells frequently upon the beauty and the melancholy of nature ») likely reflecting her awareness of evolving tastes among her contemporaries. In this novel, she vividly describes the rugged surroundings of Lyme Regis, Charmouth, Up Lyme, and Pinny, with its “verdant crevices between romantic rocks,” as well as the town itself, which appears melancholy and deserted after the sea-bathing season has ended.

==== Revealing feelings ====
Landscapes, often seen through the eyes and sensibilities of the characters contemplating them, reveal their feelings and emotions. Marianne Dashwood, who has bid a tearful farewell to the woods of Norland with a pre-romantic sensibility, surveys the “superb walks” offered by the Barton valley where she now lives, admiring the landscape following the aesthetic conventions advocated by Gilpin.

Elizabeth Bennet, amazed by the harmonious, balanced beauty of Pemberley Park, realizes that the estate is a reflection of its owner, and her view of Darcy evolves. Fanny Price, like her favorite poets, is sensitive to the lyricism of nature: the beauty of the sky “in the brightness of a cloudless night”, a cool horseback ride on a summer's morning, or the carriage ride from Mansfield Park to Sotherton through the rolling Northamptonshire landscape, during which she is “delighted to observe all that was new and admire all that was pretty”. Similarly, Anne Elliot's sense of melancholy resonates with the autumnal scenery around her.

==== Symbolic connotations ====
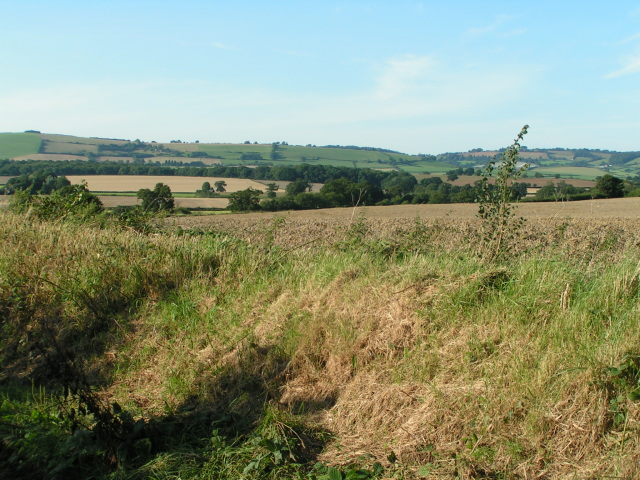
From Stevenstone Barton, one of Devon's many Bartons.

===== Demythologizing and allegorical content =====
If Barton valley is admired by Marianne and corresponds to the bucolic vision of the idle rich tempted, like the vain Robert Ferrars, to play the countryman, Jane Austen debunks this overly idyllic image. George Crabbe, a poet whose writings she admired, had already done so in The Village. Here, Mrs. Dashwood and her daughters live sparingly in a cottage (a cottage with a prosaic tiled roof, not a poetic thatched cottage), giving the pragmatic Edward, who has come to visit, an opportunity to admire the reasoned exploitation and opulence of the farmland.

Invited by her Aunt Gardiner on a pleasure trip “perhaps as far as the Lakes”, Elizabeth Bennet is delighted: “Adieu to disappointment and spleen. What are men to rocks and mountains? Oh, what hours of transport we shall spend!" However, the journey to Derbyshire has an initiatory value for her: thanks to a visit to Pemberley, an estate "without anything artificial", she learns not to be content with admiring the surface of things, their aesthetic or picturesque aspect.

In Mansfield Park, the walk through Sotherton’s expansive, winding park serves as a parable: the crossing of successive gates, fences, and barriers symbolically foreshadows the varying degrees of social and moral transgression to which all the characters, except Fanny, are willing to commit.

In contrast, Box Hill is not described in detail, despite being a popular excursion destination in Jane Austen’s time, as it remains today, renowned for its panoramic views. The narrator notes that “Everybody had a burst of admiration on first arrival,” as this location sets the stage for a pivotal scene in Emma. However, the picnic at Box Hill, despite the idyllic setting, ends in disaster when Miss Woodhouse, neglecting her responsibilities, acts selfishly.

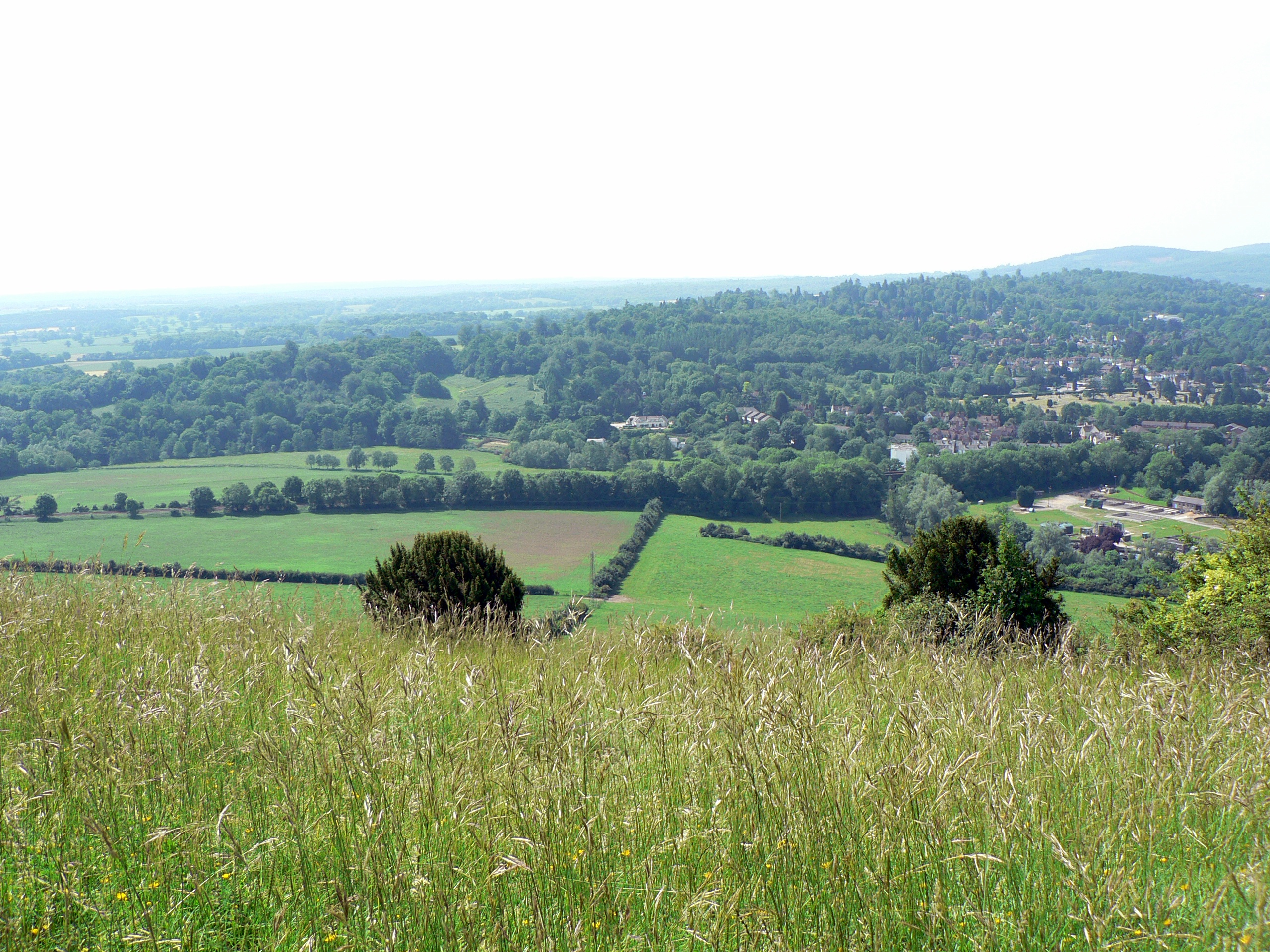
Surrey landscape seen from Box Hill.

===== Metaphorical value =====
All the novels evoke a landscape of hedgerows and bocages, a metaphor for the confined, “enclosed” life the young women endure, but historically linked to the enclosure movement: Elinor prefers to remain silent when John Dashwood, to avoid giving a jewel to his half-sisters, complains about the price of fences, (Note: With war with France and the Continental Blockade requiring more intensive farming, the privatization of communal land (or enclosure movement) begun in the 16th century accelerated between 1795 and 1805. This entailed major costs (creation of access roads, drainage works) that small farmers were unable to bear, as they were also deprived of grazing land, turning them into sharecroppers for large landowners, or leading them to join the proletariat in industrial towns.) while he increases his fortune by participating in this movement that transforms communal land open to free grazing into private plots bordered by hedges.

Henry Tilney, introducing Catherine to the art of landscape drawing during their walk in Beechen Cliff with her sister, addresses an issue that is disrupting (to his advantage) the life of the farming community in Gloucestershire, where his rectory is located, by evoking "forests, their fences, fallow land, crown land, and government".

The walkers from Uppercross to Winthrop pass through large enclosures enclosed by fences, and take paths lined with hedges, allowing Anne Elliot to overhear an essential conversation between Wentworth and Louisa (“Captain Wentworth and Louisa in the hedge-row behind her”).

=== Estates ===
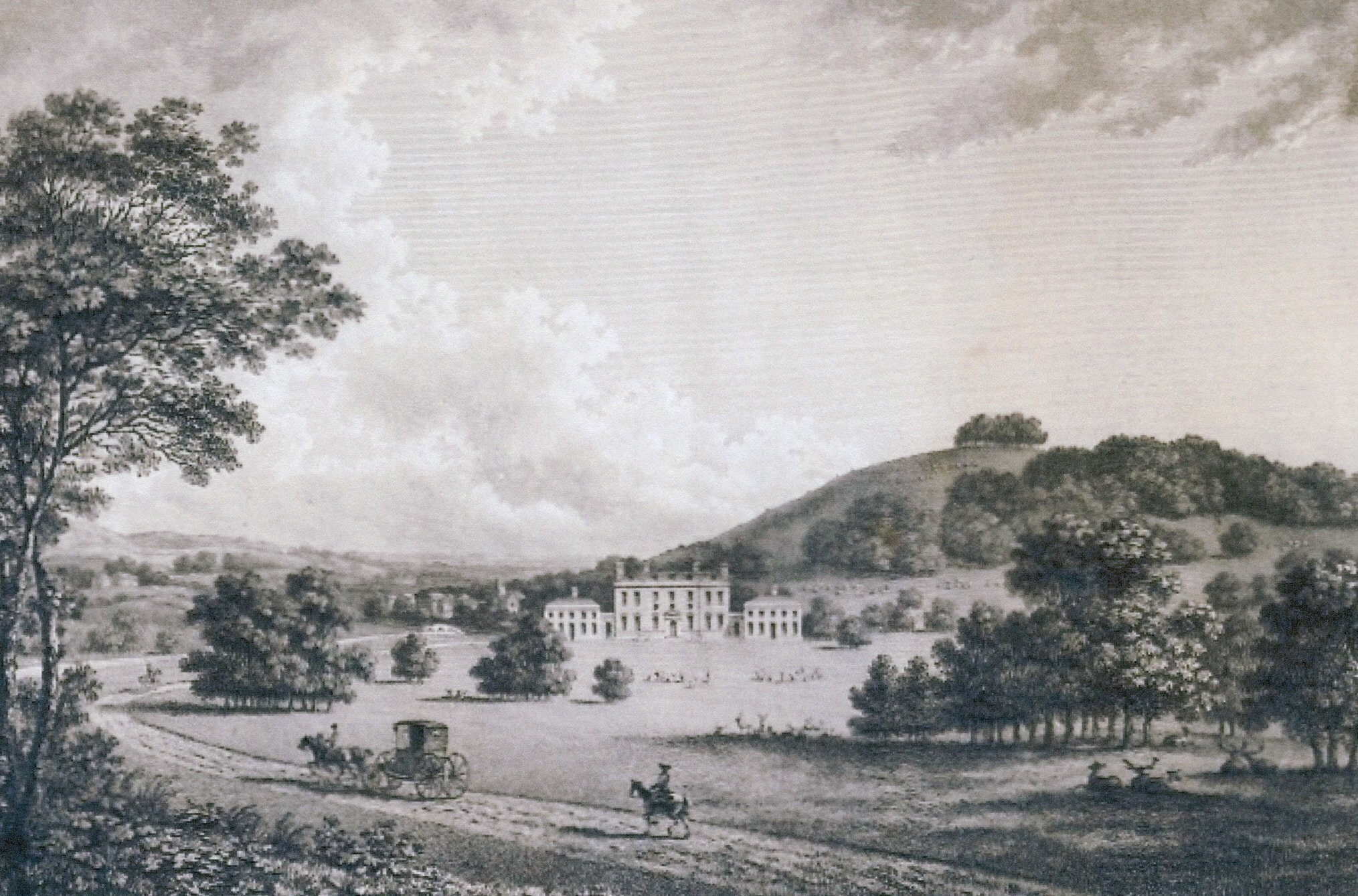
Godmersham Park, in 1779. Jane stayed there and may have drawn inspiration from it for Norland, Mansfield Park, and even Pemberley.

Jane Austen contrasts the landlords whose families have owned and managed their estates for generations - of whom Mr. Darcy and Mr. Knightley are the archetypes - with the conceitedly ostentatious new owners who, despite comfortable incomes, recognize no obligation either to their kin or to their neighbors. This wealthy landed aristocracy, represented by John Dashwood and General Tilney, spends vast sums embellishing their estates, has a misguided relationship with heritage and a utilitarian approach to agriculture; through the highly profitable practice of enclosures, they have led, from the 1790s onwards, to the correlative impoverishment of rural dwellers.

In Sense and Sensibility, the novelist contrasts Norland, whose “improvements” are only fashionable, displaying the egoism and vanity of the new owner, with Barton and Delaford, the estates of John Middleton and Colonel Brandon, whose layout is more in keeping with her idea of a wisely managed estate. Edward Ferrars admired Sir John's “woods full of fine trees [... his] rich meadows and neat farms scattered here and there”. Delaford, prefiguring Donwell Abbey is, above all, it is a self-sufficient estate, organized to enable those who depend on it to live comfortably.

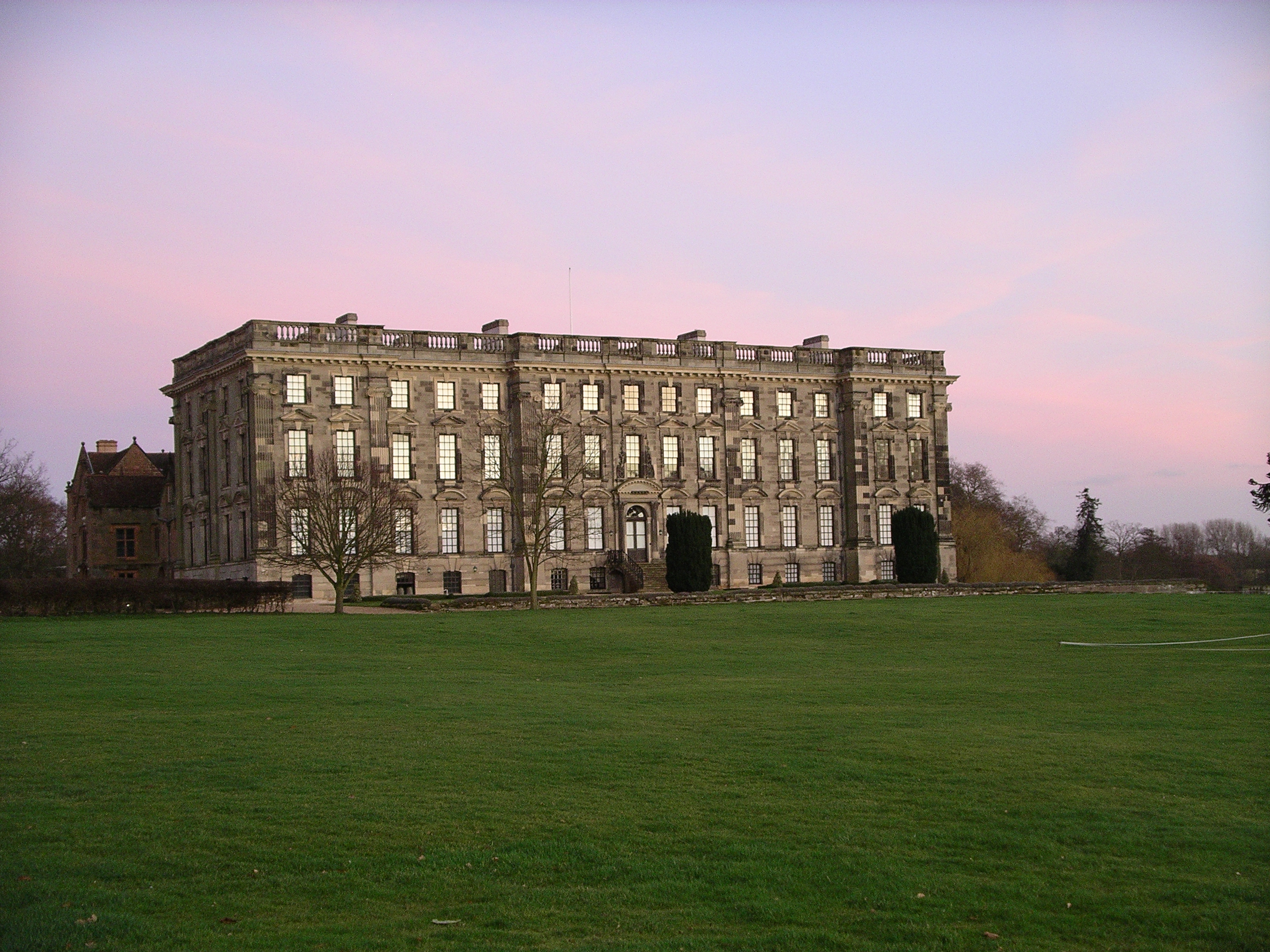
The imposing façade of Stoneleigh Abbey, a source of inspiration for Sotherton.

Pride and Prejudice establishes a hierarchy between the different estates where the heroine stays: Longbourn, Mr. Bennet's small, entail-stricken estate, which is just enough to support his family comfortably; Netherfield, whose tenancy enables Charles Bingley to learn the landlord's ways; the “showy and unnecessarily lavish” Rosings Park, which perfectly reflects the character of its owner, Lady Catherine, smug, ostentatious and full of self-importance; and Pemberley, the novelist's most perfect Brownian construction. Mr. Darcy's estate, where aesthetics reflect ethics in a true mirror game, is a symbol of balance between nature and culture, the utopian place where, around Darcy and Elizabeth, an ideal, patriarchal society can flourish, sheltered from the pettiness and vanity of the world.

In Mansfield Park, Jane Austen, who witnessed Humphry Repton's transformations of Stoneleigh Abbey (a vast Warwickshire mansion inherited in 1806 by the Reverend Thomas Leigh, her mother's cousin), evokes Capability Brown and Humphry Repton's aesthetic enhancement of large estates in Sotherton, a metaphor for the small, centuries-old landed gentry who had begun to lose respect for tradition without really entering the modern world: called a “gloomy old prison” by its owner, who wants to modernize it, it doesn't really lend itself to fashionable transformations. The “modern house”, Mansfield Park, whose size and inhabitants so frighten Fanny Price on her arrival, and of which only the “East Room”, her exclusive domain, her “cosy nest”, (Note: Janet Todd points out that only two rooms have exclusive use: the library, reserved for the master, Sir Thomas, and the East Room, decorated in his image by Fanny.) is described at length, will see the decay and moral bankruptcy of the Bertram family, and will owe its survival only to this poor cousin whose refusal to compromise symbolizes the resistance of the old stoic values of rural England.

The last estate Jane Austen presents, Kellynch Hall, ancestral home of the Elliots, baronets in Somerset, is the only one its owner is forced to leave and rent out. Since the death of Lady Elliot, who managed the property with restraint, Sir Walter and his eldest daughter have been driving it to ruin with their extravagance. The cold, pompous decorum of the noble residence contrasts with the simplicity of the Musgroves' “Big House” at Uppercross, full of life and cheerful disorder. Anne Elliot observes that Admiral Croft is a better manager than the rightful owner: the vain and sterile landed gentry, unable to make their estate bear fruit, have abdicated all their duties and are now giving way to an emerging social group, who have earned their new position on merit and represent the future.

=== Locations ===
Jane Austen cites both real cities and imaginary towns, though the locations are precise enough for some researchers to have gone to great lengths to find the places she used to create them. (Note: John Wiltshire, for example, was interested in “Mansfield and Sotherton”, Kenneth Smith in “Longbourn”, Donald Greene in “Pemberley and Lambton”, Anne Marie Edwards in “Barton Park”.) Among the real cities, two play a major role: London, which appears in four novels, and Bath in the last two published. The choice of perfectly recognizable real-life locations for the plot contributes to the realism of Austen's novelistic space, but also lends these locations a symbolic significance, (Note: Thus Cheapside, the shopping district where the estimable Gardiners live, has pejorative connotations in Miss Bingley's perspective. Portsmouth, where Fanny Price is exiled, is a particularly dirty, stuffy, enclosed place Massei-Chamayou (2012, p. 207)]) conducive to ideological interpretation.

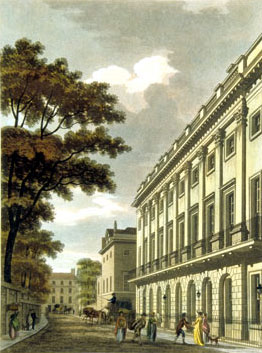
The Mayfair district in 1801

==== London, the town ====
Known as “ the town”, a person's presence in the cultural, financial, and political capital sets social status. It's in vogue to spend the “Season” there, typically from January to April, (Note: The Season coincided with the session of Parliament, beginning after Christmas, at the end of the hunting season, interrupted for two weeks at Easter, and resuming until June, the Ascot racing season. Parliament closed no later than August 12, when the grouse hunting season opened.) as it is the ideal place to meet important people and for girls to make their entry into the world.

In Sense and Sensibility, “the town” plays a central role. Many of the scenes take place in perfectly localized areas (Pall Mall, Drury Lane, the luxury boutiques of Piccadilly) around Mayfair, the residential district near Hyde Park where wealthy people sought to escape the stench of East London. Jane knew the area well, having often visited her brother Henry.

But in Jane Austen's work, London generally embodies a world that is amoral, frivolous and snobbish, selfish and superficial. It's both a place where secrets come to light, and a world of betrayal and lies, where polite facades mask dryness of heart. Sense and Sensibility depicts a world of snobs, where social relations are governed by conventions and rituals whose artificiality is ironically underlined. In Pride and Prejudice, the capital is a place of confusion, where characters cross paths without meeting, and a place of perdition where Lydia and Wickham hide. In Mansfield Park, the town is corrupt and corrupting, and Fanny Price judges it harshly; Tom, badly recovered from his fall in Newmarket, ruins his health there and falls seriously ill; Mary Crawford has benefited from a worldly education there and frequents a superficial society with elastic morals; Mrs. Rushworth gets giddy in the fashionable salons before starting an adulterous affair with Henry Crawford.

London's neighborhoods have social connotations, with rich and poor, rentiers and shopkeepers living in different, watertight sectors. Jane Austen places her characters in neighborhoods appropriate to their situation: the well-to-do live in the west, in the newer districts between Oxford Street and Regent's Park. The Steele girls live modestly further east. Miss Bingley, who lives in upmarket Grosvenor Street, speaks disdainfully of the Cheapside area where Mr. Gardiner has his offices and home. (Note: Gracechurch Street lies to the east of the City, not far from London Bridge and the busy shopping street of Cheapside. The City is the business district, but not far to the north you'll find polluting and particularly smelly factories, manufacturing plants and artisanal activities.) Yet it's a cheerful, amiable home where Jane Bennet winters, Elizabeth stops off on her way to Kent and Darcy comes to dine after Lydia's wedding.

Highbury, where Emma Woodhouse lives, is so close to London (Note: Highbury, then 16 miles from London, is now part of the London Borough of Islington.) that it's common for gentlemen to ride there for the day: Mr. Elton goes to have Harriet Smith's portrait framed; Frank Churchill alleges a visit to his hairdresser to justify his trip, even though his real motive is the purchase of a piano. Mr. Weston may go for business and return early enough to spend the evening with friends. John Knightley and his family live in Brunswick Square, (Note: Brunswick Square, named after the Prince-Regent's wife, is now Bloomsbury.) a rather upmarket address. Emma's elder sister Isabella welcomed Harriet Smith, who had come to London to have her teeth fixed, and her brother-in-law George Knightley, who hoped to ease his heartache.

==== Bath ====
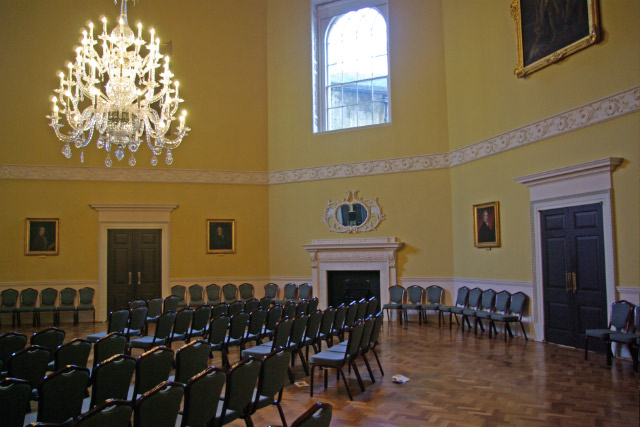
The “octagonal room” of the Assembly Rooms

Bath, a tourist town in the early 18th century, was associated with Richard “Beau” Nash (1674-1762), who oversaw its social activities during that period. Toward the end of the century, its character shifted as an influx of newly wealthy individuals and middle-class retirees, drawn by its reputation, began to arrive.

The town serves as the setting for the first part of Northanger Abbey and the second part of Persuasion. When she began Susan, the future Northanger Abbey, in 1798, Jane Austen was familiar with Bath, having spent a few weeks there with her mother and sister at the end of 1797 with the Leigh-Perrots, who spent the winter months at No. 1 Paragon Buildings. Jane and Cassandra moved there permanently at the end of 1800, when their father decided to retire. They continued living there after his death on January 21, 1805, under financially strained circumstances. This extended residence in Bath coincided with the writing of Persuasion, her second novel set in the town.

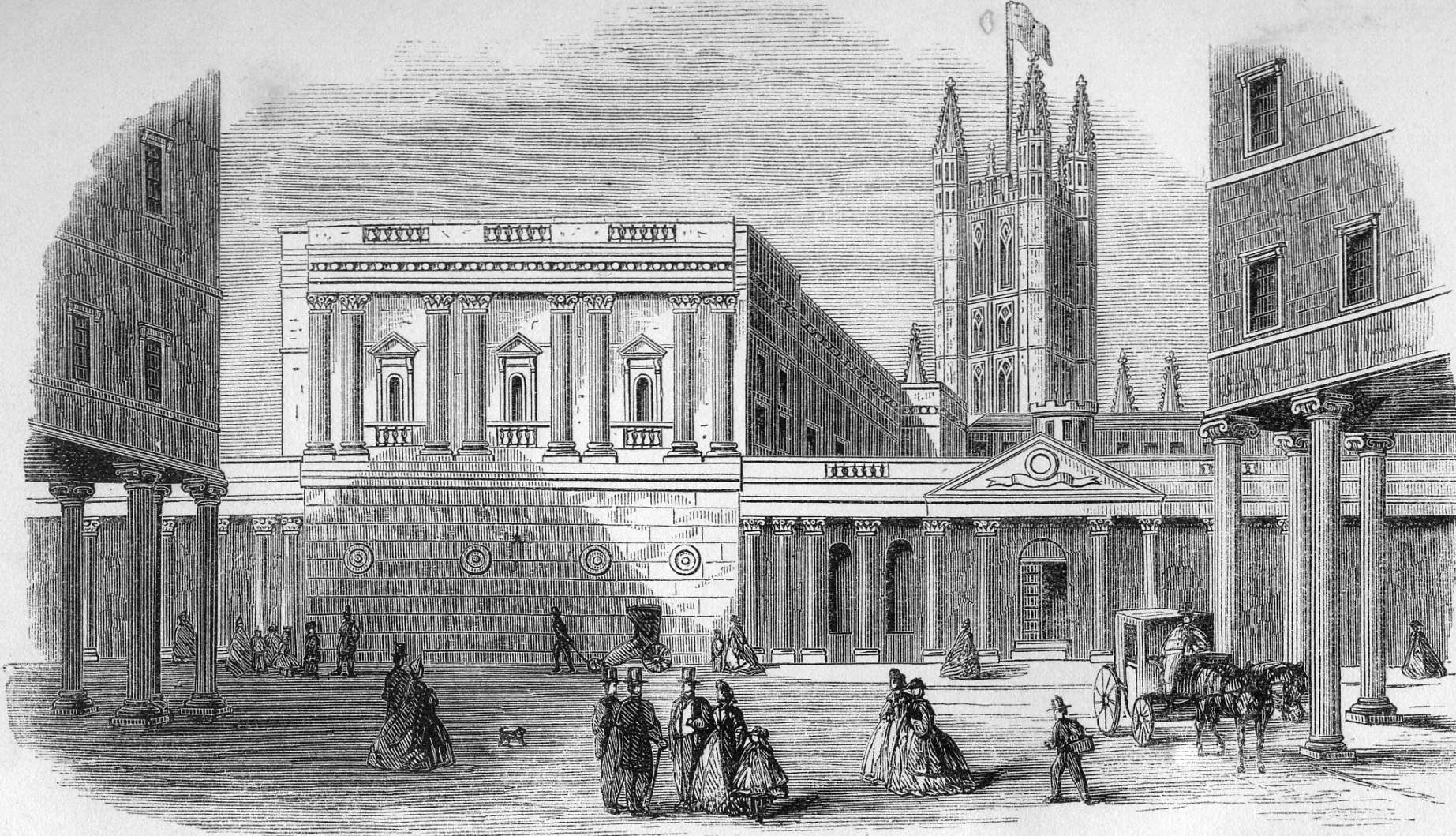
The Pump Room and entrance to the baths, mid-19th century.

Life in Bath as depicted in Northanger Abbey is portrayed through the social activities of the characters, with much of the novel’s events occurring there, during the active social season. The Allens, accompanied by Catherine Morland, settle in Great Pulteney Street, on the east bank of the Avon. Catherine discovered the Upper Rooms, where a large crowd prevents her from accessing the dance floor, and the Lower Rooms (later destroyed by fire in 1820), near the Pump Room, where she eventually dances with Henry Tilney. She also takes trips to the surrounding countryside, including Blaize Castle with the Thorpes and Beechen Cliff with Henry and Eleanor Tilney.

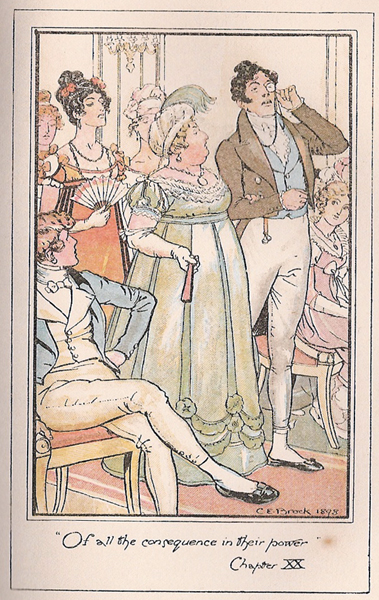
Sir Walter glows as he enters the concert hall on the arm of Lady Dalrymple (C. E. Brock, 1898).

In Persuasion, Sir Walter Elliot and his Dalrymple cousins, who reside in Laura Place, do not visit the prominent social venues of Bath such as the Upper Rooms or Lower Rooms, except for a concert held at the Rooms for an individual supported by Lady Dalrymple. The Pump Room is referenced only when Mary Musgrove observes its entrance from the White Hart, where the Musgroves are staying. Bath’s social interactions in the novel involve a limited group of wealthy and titled families who occupy specific residential areas.

Bath serves both as a holiday destination and a spa town. While, much like in London, residences carry significant social connotations, Bath’s compact layout — often explored on foot — encourages the mingling of different social groups, fosters the creation and dissolution of social networks, and allows for unexpected encounters. For instance, Anne Elliot reunites with a former schoolmate who is now ill and financially ruined, as well as with Frederick Wentworth. Eliza Williams, Colonel Brandon’s ward, is seduced and later abandoned by Willoughby, while Catherine Morland meets the Thorpes (though she prefers the company of the Tilneys). Meanwhile, the ambitious Mr. Elton travels to Bath in search of a wife and returns with Augusta Hawkins, the wealthy daughter of a nouveau riche family.

==== Seaside towns ====
During the rise of Romanticism, coastal landscapes gained popularity, and sea bathing began to overshadow thermal spa treatments, leading to the development of resorts along England’s south coast. These locations became destinations for health treatments and summer holidays. This trend is depicted in Jane Austen’s unfinished novel, Sanditon.

==== Seaside resorts ====
The tradition of seaside resorts began in Weymouth in 1789 with the arrival of George III. The Prince Regent, however, favored Brighton, where he commissioned the construction of the Royal Pavilion in the early 1800s as his summer residence. The popularity of seaside resorts is reflected in two of Austen’s novels. In Emma, Frank Churchill secretly becomes engaged to Jane Fairfax during their time in Weymouth. In Pride and Prejudice, Wickham, who had previously attempted to elope with Georgiana Darcy from Ramsgate, flees Brighton with Lydia Bennet, who is also just 15 years old. The youth, naivety, and lack of proper supervision make these young girls vulnerable to exploitation. For Jane Austen, the seaside represents a setting where young people, far from their families, form hidden, reckless, and socially perilous connections.

==== Portsmouth and Lyme Regis ====
Two other seaside towns hold a special place in Austen's work: Portsmouth, where her two seafaring brothers were educated, and Lyme Regis, where she stayed.

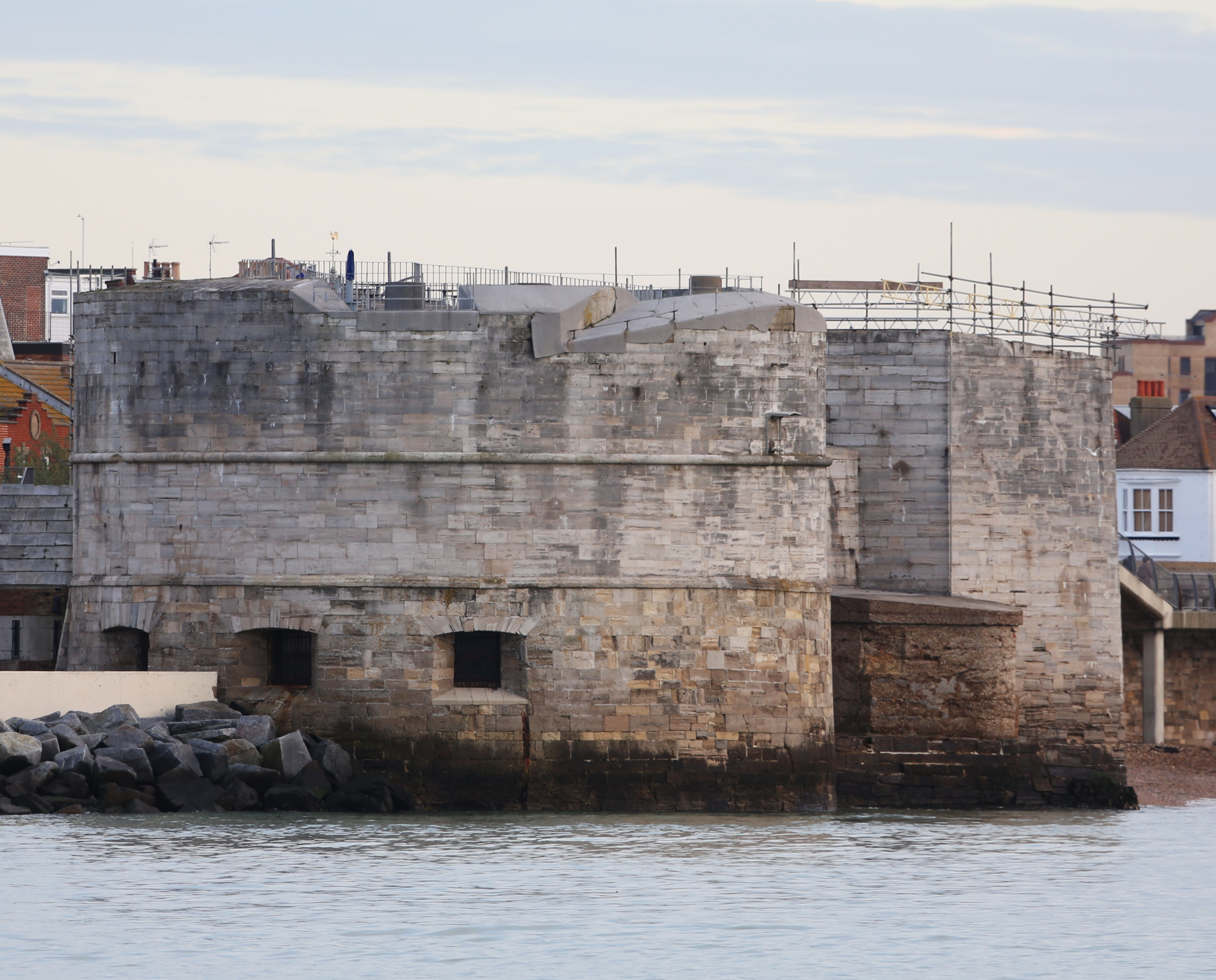
Photo of the round tower (and the 18 gun battery) viewed from Gosport

===== Portsmouth =====
The hometown of the heroine in Mansfield Park is a military port, described as dirty and poorly drained, yet it is a strategically vital deep-water port located behind a narrow entrance. Jane Austen was familiar with the town through visits to her brothers during their time at naval school: Frank attended from 1786 to 1788, and Charles from 1791 onward.

Fanny Price, who left her hometown sorrowfully at the age of ten, returns at nineteen after being sent away by her uncle. He believes that a few uncomfortable weeks with her family will persuade her to accept Henry Crawford’s marriage proposal. Austen does not explicitly mention that the town is a wartime garrison, with all its associated excesses — details that would have been well known to her contemporaries. Instead, Fanny simply observes that the men are rude, the women impertinent, and everyone ill-bred. The Price family’s financial struggles immerse Fanny in a world of sordid materiality, marked by dirt, noise, and disorder. This three-month stay, however, allows her to appreciate, by contrast, the sense of belonging she feels at Mansfield Park.

===== Lyme Regis =====
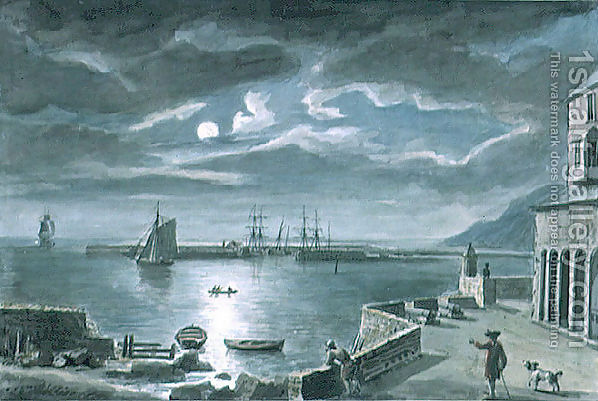
The Harbour And The Cobb, Lyme Regis, Dorset, By Moonlight by Copplestone Warre Bamfylde

This fishing port plays a pivotal role in Persuasion: the walk on the Cobb, where Louisa suffers a serious fall, marks a key moment in the novel. It reveals to Frederick that Anne, now 27, still commands attention, while also allowing Anne to demonstrate her composure and decisiveness. (Note: Lord Tennyson, who visited the town on August 23, 1867, asked to see the exact spot where Louisa Musgrove fell, and Charles Darwin's son Francis, who became interested in Lyme Regis because of Persuasion, also looked for the exact spot where Louisa fell, proof if any were needed of the reality of Jane Austen's characters for her readers.) Jane Austen visited the region on several occasions: in 1803, she spent the summer in Charmouth, Dorset, and later visited Lyme Regis in November. The family returned to the Devon and Dorset coasts in the summer of 1804, staying in Lyme Regis for a few days. At the time, Lyme was a modest and affordable town, accessible to the middle class “without the need for extravagant displays or sacrifices to maintain appearances.” It was not a fashionable destination, which allowed Captain Harville, living on half-pay, to spend the winter there with his wife and children without concern for societal expectations. Unlike the noisy and disorderly home of the Prices on Portsmouth’s lower High Street, the Harvilles’ small house “at the foot of the old pier” is portrayed as a warm and welcoming place, characterized by generous and unpretentious hospitality.

== Sociological aspects ==
In Jane Austen's time, English society was still a highly hierarchical class society, with fairly watertight social classes where the individual had an assigned social status: at the top of the ladder, the aristocracy, then the gentry, and finally the commoners.

=== A class-based society ===
The aristocracy is depicted, albeit in a rather negative light, primarily through the character of Lady Catherine in Pride and Prejudice. Jane Austen’s focus, however, lies more on the traditional landed gentry, (Note: As she gave her paper characters names that referred to authentic British families (Middleton, Dashwood, Darcy, Bingley, Churchill, Elliot...) her contemporary readers easily identified them as members of the gentry.) which includes both titled individuals (such as Sir John Middleton and Sir Walter Elliot) and untitled members of long-established families (like Mr. Darcy and Mr. Knightley), as well as more recent landowners (such as John Dashwood, General Tilney, and Sir Thomas Bertram). Among the commoners, Austen portrays the “nouveau riche”—wealthy individuals who gained their fortunes through the Industrial Revolution (e.g., the Gardiners and Bingleys)—and Royal Navy officers enriched by wartime spoils (e.g., Admiral Croft and Frederick Wentworth). She also includes figures like Robert Martin, a farmer associated with Mr. Knightley, and impoverished young women (e.g., the Steele sisters and Miss Fairfax), whose surnames often hint at their modest origins: Miss Taylor (tailor) and Harriet Smith (blacksmith). Notably, the working class and servants remain largely invisible in her narratives.

==== The masculine world ====
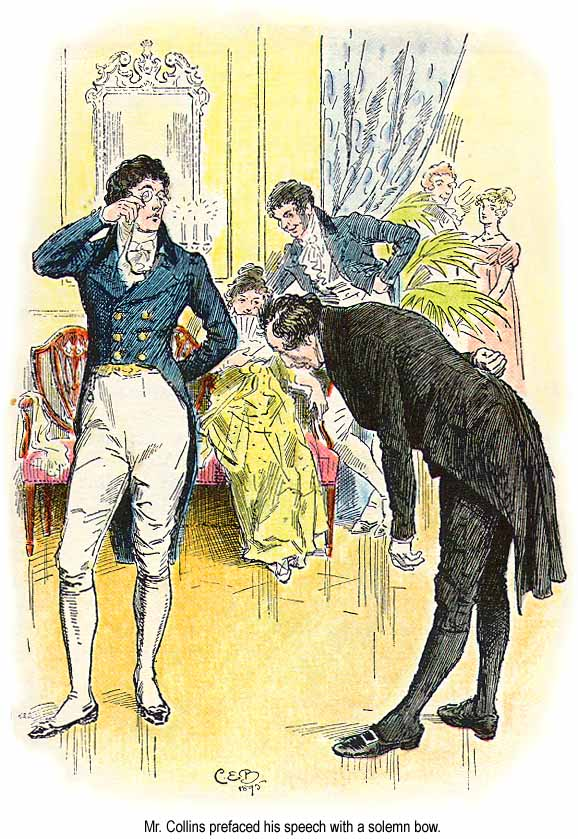
C. E. Brock illustration for the 1895 edition of Jane Austen's novel Pride and Prejudice (Chapter 18)

In this restricted social universe, gentlemen's prospects are limited: the eldest member of the family is the sole heir, which generally exempts him from seeking a profession, and his social position is all the higher as the income from his estates is substantial: thus, Mr Darcy and Mr Knightley have a privileged social position. The cadets, like ordinary people, have to earn their living, in the Church, the Judiciary or the Army; John Knightley is a lawyer, a number are former officers (Sir John Middleton, Colonel Brandon, General Tilney) or in active service: Fitzwilliam, the youngest son of a Lord, is a colonel, Wickham is a lieutenant of infantry, and Wentworth a captain in the Royal Navy.

The profession of clergyman is the only one that recurs across all of Jane Austen’s novels, a reflection of her family’s familiarity with the vocation. Characters such as Mr. Collins in Pride and Prejudice, Edward Ferrars in Sense and Sensibility, Henry Tilney and Mr. Morland in Northanger Abbey, and Edmund Bertram and Dr. Grant in Mansfield Park provide various portrayals of this profession. Even in Emma (with Mr. Elton) and Persuasion (with Charles Hayter), clergymen appear among the secondary characters.

However, Austen’s portrayal of the clergy is far from indulgent. While Edmund Bertram, who enters the church out of genuine vocation and religious conviction, takes his responsibilities to his future parishioners seriously, Mr. Collins exemplifies what a clergyman should not be: obsequious toward the powerful and arrogant toward the weak. Henry Tilney, though worldly and knowledgeable about fashion, spends much of his time away from his parish, even vacationing in Bath, a reflection of the lack of commitment some clergy showed toward their congregations. Dr. Grant, an indolent and self-indulgent bon vivant whose primary concern is good food (a preoccupation that ultimately proves fatal), embodies the Sybaritic clergymen of the 18th century, known for their love of luxury and fine dining. This aspect of the profession, widely criticized within the Church of England, also underscores Mary Crawford’s prejudices against the clergy.

The author is equally critical of the sons of wealthy families who, like Tom Bertram, live extravagantly and endanger their household’s financial stability. At the same time, Austen demonstrates a keen awareness of societal changes and portrays certain social groups, often subject to hostile prejudices, in a positive light. For instance, she presents merchants favorably in Pride and Prejudice through the Gardiners and farmers in Emma through Robert Martin. In Persuasion, sailors are particularly celebrated and honored, a subtle tribute to her two brothers, Francis and Charles, who served as naval officers.

==== Codified social relations ====
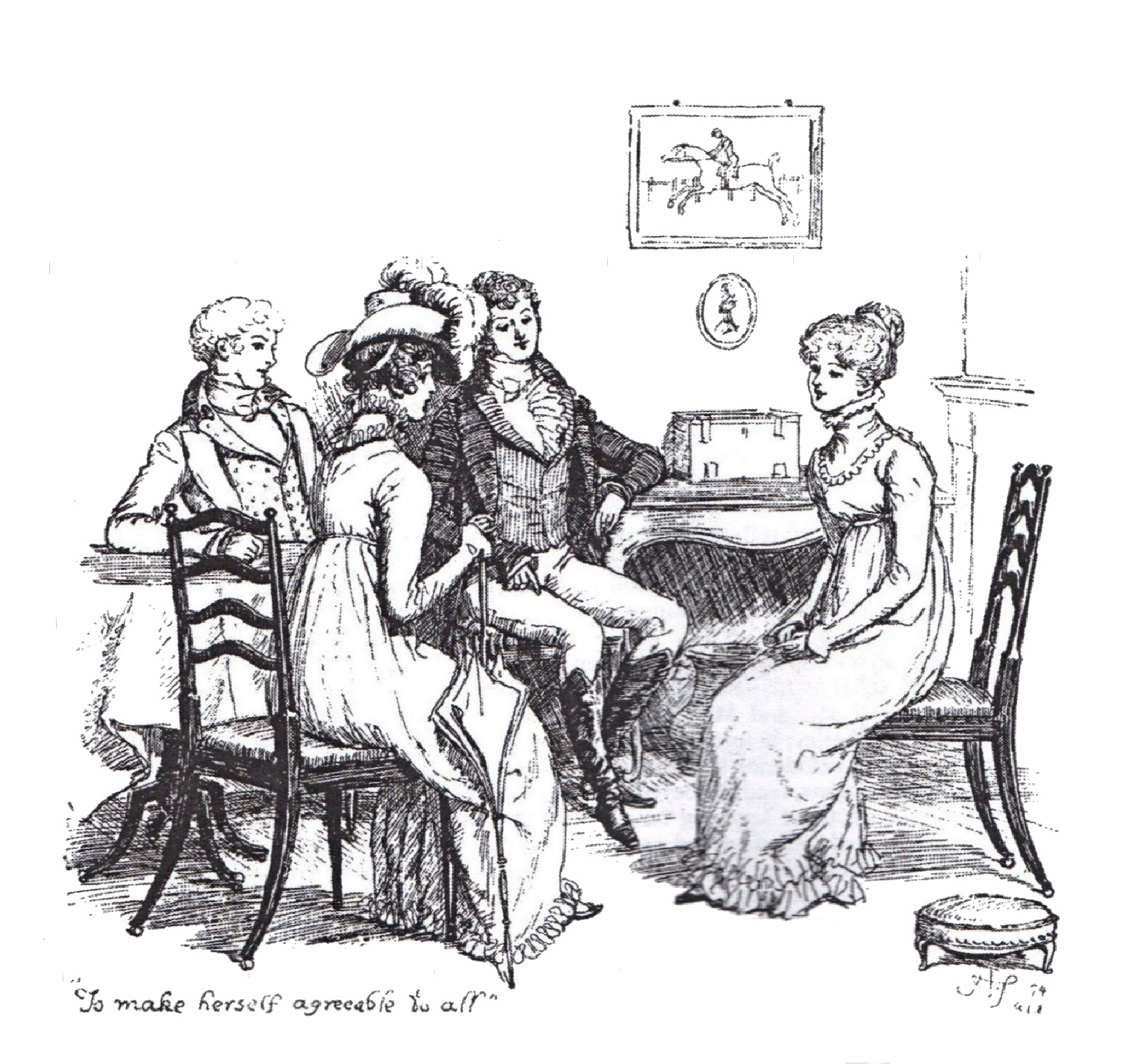
Pride and Prejudice, chapter 44: At Lambton, the visitors are all predisposed in Elizabeth's favor.

Social relations in Austen’s world are governed by codified norms, precepts, and rules of decorum. Transgressing these rules is viewed, at best, as a breach of good manners and, at worst, as outright rudeness. For example, one does not address a person of higher rank without a proper introduction, as Mr. Collins does; a young woman does not write to a man who is neither a relative nor her fiancé, as Marianne Dashwood does; and Mary Musgrove, the daughter of a baronet, takes offense when her untitled mother-in-law fails to defer to her. The hierarchy within the family is also defined. A married woman takes precedence over an unmarried woman, even if the latter is older, as Lydia Wickham reminds Jane Bennet. Similarly, Emma Woodhouse, though aware of her social standing, begins to feel uneasy about her unmarried status due to the foolish vanity of the clergyman’s wife, to whom she must now yield precedence simply because she is married.

Whatever her original status, a woman takes on that of the man she marries, since a woman's social status is determined by that of her father, as long as she's single, and then by that of her husband, as shown in Mansfield Park by the difference in status of the three Ward sisters, married in very different social spheres, and the divergent paths taken by their children.

Men and women, living in separate spheres, only meet on social occasions: visits, parties, balls, concerts, or more intimate gatherings, teas or dinners where guests are added to family members; it's at such gatherings that Brandon makes the acquaintance of Marianne Dashwood and Edward Ferrars that of Elinor; it's the same for Elizabeth Bennet and Mr. Darcy, Frank Churchill and Emma Woodhouse, Catherine Morland and Henry Tilney.

The arrival of an outsider in an established group creates an imbalance: the arrival of the Bingleys and Darcy in Meryton, the Crawfords in Mansfield, Frank Churchill in Highsbury and Frederick Wentworth in Kellynch stirs up local society and leads to a great deal of speculation, mainly matrimonial.

=== Sociological types ===
What captivates Jane Austen is the intricate dynamics of the small society she observes with keen insight. She delights in identifying human foibles such as snobbery, hypocrisy, vanity, greed, and the pursuit of prestige or wealth, offering no leniency toward scornful pride or foolishness. As Kate and Paul Rague noted in 1914, her characters are “like those we encounter every day, possessing neither extraordinary virtue nor exceptional vice.”

==== A miniature "human comedy" ====
Jane Austen's art is based on dialogue, those “marvellous little speeches which sum up, in a few minutes’ chatter, all that we need in order to know a [caracter] for ever”, as Virginia Woolf put it. Her stories, both heirs to 18th-century English comedy and forerunners of Balzacian's approach to the world in La Comédie humaine, are little comedies in two or three acts, corresponding to the two or three volumes of the original editions.

The Jane Austen version of the “human comedy” includes universal types such as the ingenue (Catherine Morland, Harriet Smith), the coquette (Isabella Thorpe, Lydia Bennet), the boaster (John Thorpe), the noble father (Sir Thomas), the despot or domestic tyrant (General Tilney, Lady Catherine de Bourgh, Mrs Ferrars), the more or less foolish chatter (Mrs Allen, Mrs Palmer, Mrs Bennet, Mrs Norris, Miss Bates), the petty, manipulative hypocrite (Lucy Steele in the fiendish genre, or the more arrogant Caroline Bingley), and others more typically English like the rake (Willoughby, George Wickham, Henry Crawford), and the dandy (Robert Ferrars, even Sir Walter Elliot). However, she takes pleasure in varying the settings in which they evolve, and in nuancing her characters.

She also uses the stereotype of the mismatched couple, comical in the case of the Palmers and Middletons, with more dramatic stakes in the case of the Bennets, and the association of opposing characters: Elinor and Marianne Dashwood, Jane and Elizabeth Bennet, Fanny Price and Mary Crawford, Darcy and Wickham (or Darcy and Bingley).

==== A familiar inspiration ====
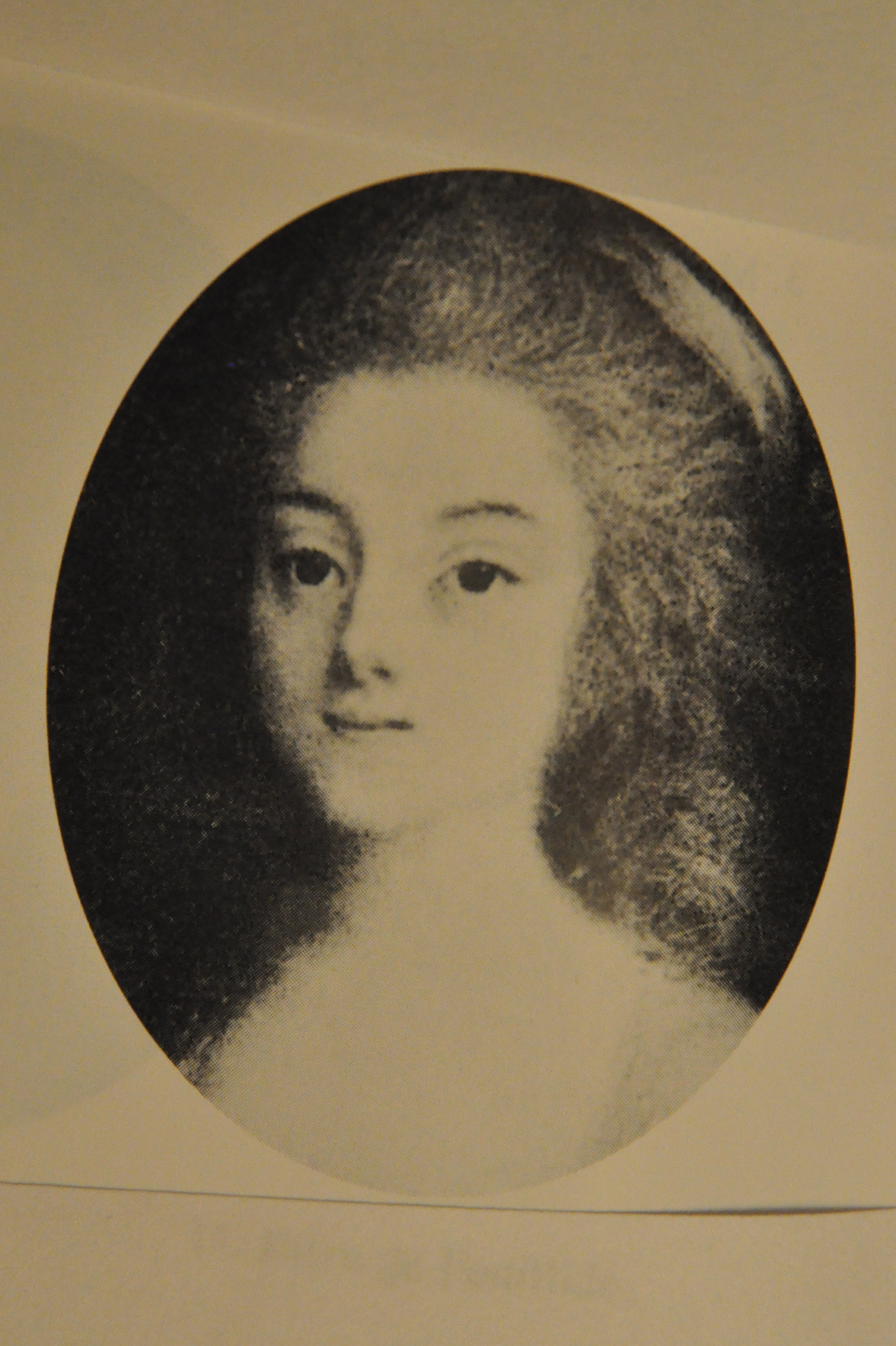
Eliza Hancock, the attractive “French” cousin

It has long been accepted that Jane Austen drew inspiration from people she knew, particularly her family, to craft her characters. For instance, Eliza de Feuillide likely inspired the horse-riding, harp-playing, and London-loving socialite Mary Crawford. Her brothers, who served in the navy, provided the basis for characters like William Price and Captain Wentworth. The close bond she shared with her sister Cassandra is reflected in the sisterly pairs in her novels — such as Elinor and Marianne Dashwood, Jane and Elizabeth Bennet, and Henrietta and Louisa Musgrove— where the elder sister, much like Cassandra, is portrayed as calm, rational, and reserved, while the younger sister is more vivacious and, at times, headstrong. Additionally, the numerous hypochondriac characters in her works, who exploit their supposed ailments, may have been inspired by her own mother. However, Austen herself denied simply portraying her acquaintances, stating: “I am too proud of my gentlemen to admit that they are only Mr. A or Colonel B.”

==== Honest man and libertine ====
In the context of the apprenticeship novel, the heroine must learn to choose the right partner, and not let herself be attracted by the bad boy with the advantageous physique and the enticing words; yet their education does not prepare young girls to resist the solicitations of libertines, while honest men are generally very ordinary, even fallible beings despite their qualities of the heart, with the exception of Darcy (but his qualities are hidden for a long time) and Wentworth (but he is not recognized for his true value until he is rich). Thus, Willoughby and Wickham are amoral enjoyers with whom the heroine falls in love a little too quickly and indiscriminately, and Frank Churchill, an unscrupulous manipulator with whom Emma becomes infatuated just by hearing about him. If Henry Crawford and William Elliot, cynical, epicurean enjoyers, can't overcome the heroine's resistance, it's because her heart is already taken.

Elinor Dashwood has recognized the moral value of the shy Edward Ferrars, despite his weaknesses, and Fanny Price has a deep, if lucid, affection for her cousin Edmund Bertram; but it's in the conversation where Harville and Anne Elliot talk of unfailing love and constancy, sentiments that go beyond romantic attachment, that Jane Austen clearly reveals how she considers the qualities of the heart that she lends to her gentlemen, qualities without which a human being is, in her eyes, a kind of infirm.

==== Heroines, alternative heroines and fake friends ====
In depicting a world centered on women, the novelist takes care in portraying her female characters. While her heroines are distinct, they share a common love of reading, though their preferences vary widely—from Gothic novels (Catherine Morland) to poetry (Marianne Dashwood, Fanny Price, Anne Elliot).

As Marilyn Butler observes, alternative heroines such as Jane Bennet and Charlotte Lucas in Pride and Prejudice, and Jane Fairfax and Harriet Smith in Emma, serve as contrasting figures that allow readers to draw comparisons. Meanwhile, false friends act as foils: Lucy Steele, for instance, seeks to hurt Elinor by revealing her secret engagement to Edward Ferrars, though Elinor maintains her composure. Isabella Thorpe’s flighty behavior helps Catherine Morland distinguish between genuine and superficial friendship. Caroline Bingley’s condescending attitude temporarily deceives the trusting Jane Bennet, while Mary Crawford poses a dangerous rivalry for Fanny Price. Anne Elliot’s sisters, one characterized by pretentious snobbery and the other by petty egotism, further highlight her virtues. As Christine Jordis notes, “it is clear that Jane Austen must have encountered such personalities and been exasperated by them.”

=== Money and social classes ===
Throughout her life, Jane Austen suffered from a lack of money, and the period in which her novels are set is conducive to the importance of money: the economy was suffering the shock of foreign wars and to previously unknown inflation, with periodic economic crises. This situation was all the more unstable in that it was accompanied by a rapid change in the distribution of wealth, with the development of the commercial sector, while the large landowners grew richer thanks to the development of modern agriculture. Money plays an essential role, so much so that the annual incomes of the main characters are always known to the reader, sometimes accompanied by numerous details about their future financial situation. Thus, the introduction of Bingley and Darcy (in Pride and Prejudice), of Colonel Brandon (in Sense and Sensibility), of Mr Rushworth and Mr Crawford (in Mansfield Park) is accompanied by the announcement of their incomes, which arouses as much interest as their own person.

==== Income hierarchy ====
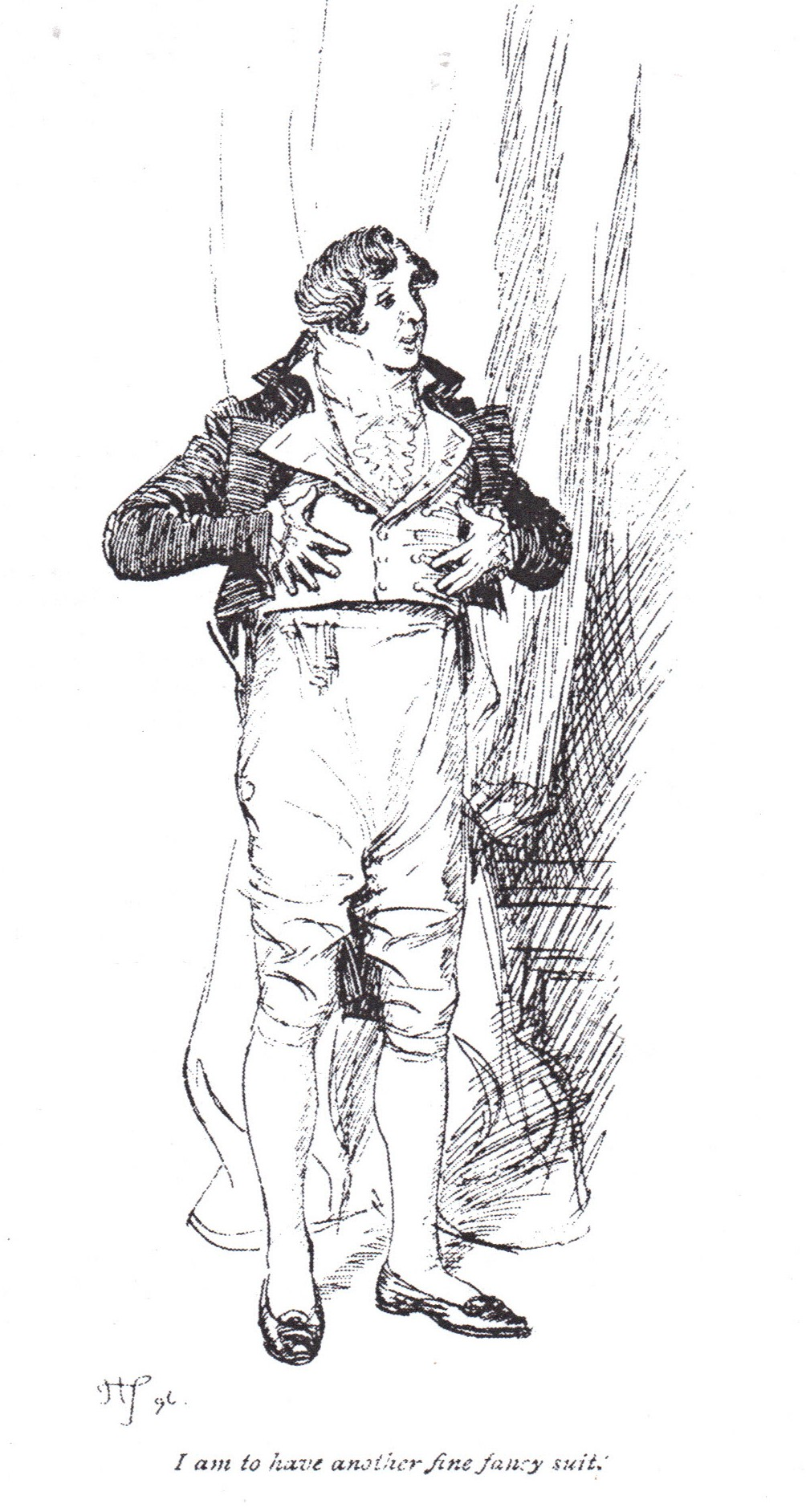
Mansfield Park, chapter 14: the clumsy James Rushworth sees, in the theatrical role assigned to him, only the pleasure of having a nice suit. (Illustration by Hugh Thomson).

All of Jane Austen's novels depict a financial hierarchy that implies very different lifestyles, from wealthy landlords who live in luxury and sometimes overindulge, to poor clergyman's widows and their unmarried daughters who struggle to make ends meet, as the range of incomes presented is very wide.

Clergymen's incomes are the most modest. The living of the parsonage of Delaford that Brandon offers to Edward Ferrars is only £200. Edmund Bertram's cure at Thornton Lacey is estimated at £750, while the Mansfield cure brings in almost £1,000. Henry Tilney was the wealthiest, having inherited his mother's “very considerable fortune” in addition to the income from his Woodston cure.

Then there are the estates, or at least those whose revenues are specified. While Combe Magna brings in just £600 for Willoughby, Delaford (Brandon's estate), like Longbourn (Mr Bennet's), brings in £2,000. The income from the estates of John Dashwood (Norland), Henry Crawford (Everingham) and no doubt George Knightley (Donwell Abbey) is £4,000; (Note: The material value of Donwell Abbey is not actually quantified anywhere in Emma, but Deirdre Le Faye puts it at “around £4,000 a year”.) this is the sum available annually to Charles Bingley, whose capital of £100,000 will later be invested in the purchase of an estate not far from Pemberley. Mr Darcy, with £10,000 from Pemberley, and James Rushworth, with £12,000 from Sotherton, are the only ones with exceptional income.

In Sense and Sensibility, the theme of money holds a special place, as the attitudes towards money of the various characters in the novel and their ideas of wealth and its power are particularly developed. John Dashwood and his wife have £6,000 a year at their disposal, but John's half-sisters and their mother live in mediocre comfort on just £500. Elinor and Marianne Dashwood have different expectations of money. Marianne estimates “mere competence” at between £1,800 and £2,000 a year, while Elinor considers £1,000 to be “wealth”. Marianne will marry Brandon (who has £2,000 to his name), while Elinor will live on around £800 after her marriage to Edward Ferrars at the Delaford Rectory.

==== Financial situation and social relevance ====
If, in this highly pragmatic society, money is a major preoccupation for most characters, the only income they consider worthy of interest remains landed income, as the landed gentry is still considered to be at the top of the social ladder. Income from trade is generally considered less respectable than wealth from landed property or state annuities (at 5%).

Jane Austen often alludes to the various ways of securing or increasing one's fortune: she treats with irony the snobbery of her characters who despise those who are socially inferior to them (Lady Catherine de Bourgh, Sir Walter Elliot), as well as the behavior of those whose sole concern is to enrich themselves further (John Dashwood, General Tilney or Mr. Elliot); on the other hand, she makes the Gardiners, who live modestly “somewhere near Cheapside”, warmly welcome visitors to Pemberley. Similarly, the simple farmer Robert Martin is held in high esteem by his landlord, Mr. Knightley, and the Navy officers, enriched by the war, are presented as noble, frank and cordial hearts.

==== The "good guys" ====
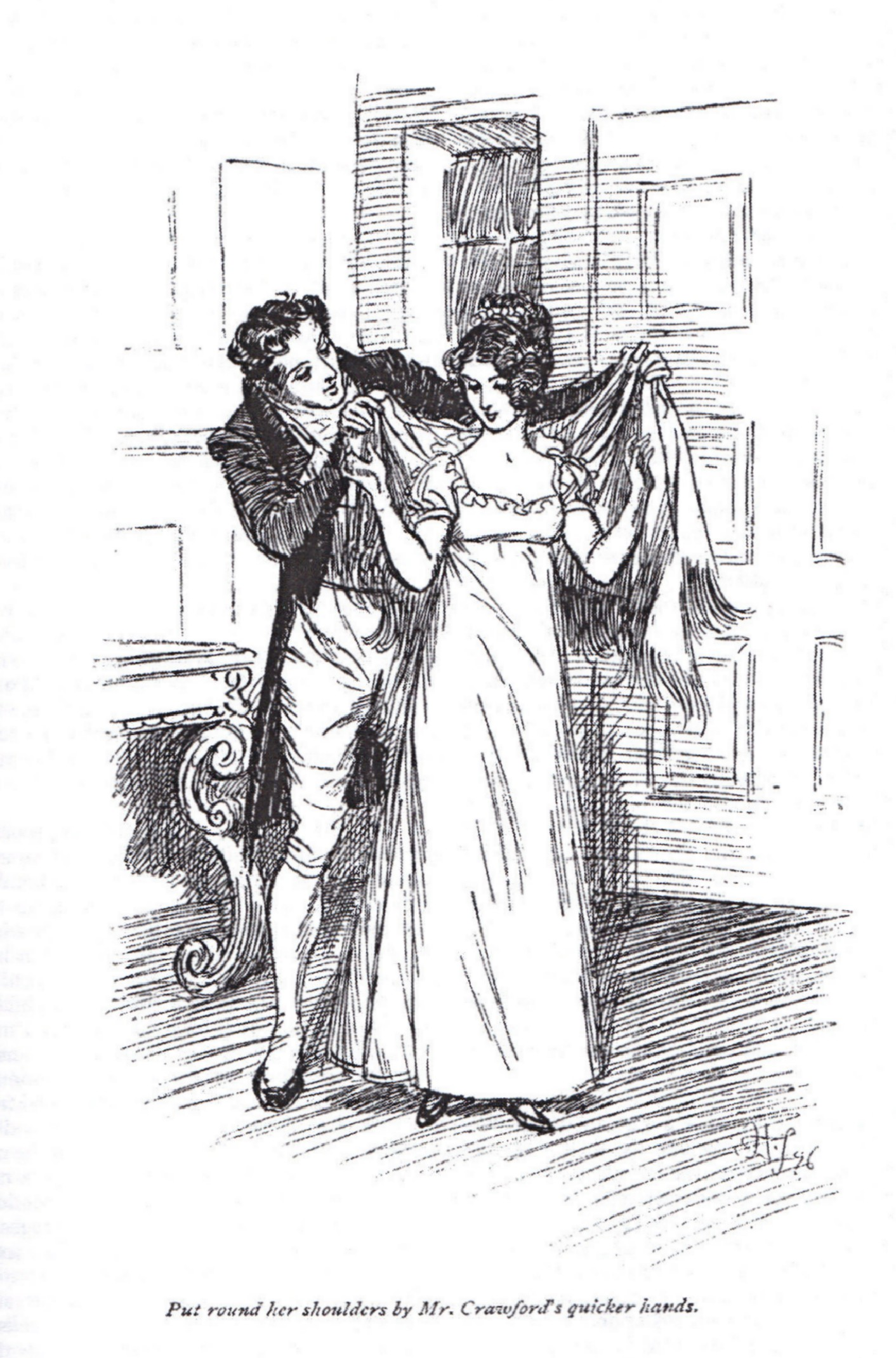
The Bertrams watch as wealthy Henry Crawford courts Fanny, the poor little cousin (Hugh Thomson's frontispiece for Mansfield Park, 1897).

The wealth of the owners is generally not indicated (for example, the fortune of John Middleton or Sir Bertram is unknown), but that of potential sons-in-law is carefully estimated by mothers anxious to marry off their daughters. So when a new gentleman joins a social group, the focus is on what he's “worth” as a person, of course, but above all in terms of his income: the more comfortable his fortune, the more likely he is to be seen as approachable, even amiable. The new tenants of Netherfield are therefore valued by the people of Meryton according to their income: first Darcy, rumored to be worth £10,000, is admired, followed by the more amiable Bingley, said to be worth £4,000 or £5,000. Mr. Collins, for his part, imagines himself tempting Elizabeth by insisting heavily on her good situation and her relations with Lady Catherine. Charlotte Lucas makes no secret of the fact that she considered position and income before accepting the request, (Note: However, the narrator doesn't specify, pointing only to a “good house” and “very sufficient income”.) and her mother calculates how long it may be before Longbourn (and its annual £2,000) belongs to her son-in-law.

The only advantage of the wealthy but foolish James Rushworth in courting Maria Bertram is his financial base (Sotherton's annual income of £12,000) and his social status (the estate is the historic cradle of his family and he has a townhouse in London); Everingham's £4,000 annual income, inherited by Henry Crawford in Norfolk, makes this libertine an “unhoped-for” match for Fanny Price, at least from a material and financial point of view, the only one taken into account.

When Captain Wentworth arrives in Bath in 1814, he is no longer a “nobody”, invisible in the eyes of good society, but somebody, because he has amassed a small fortune of £25,000, thanks to money from the prize money of war. As the world is changing, money is becoming as effective a means of social recognition as property.

==== The heiress ====
Wealthy women are often condemned being used as power or fortune, like Eliza Williams, Miss Morton or Miss Grey, but also Mrs. Tilney or Mr. Elliot's wife, rich but humble and married for money. Wickham sought to kidnap Georgiana Darcy and in interested in Miss King.

Miss Grey, whom Willoughby marries for base mercantile considerations because he lives beyond her means, has a dowry of £50,000, making her the wealthiest heiress in all Jane Austen's novels, with Miss Morton, Emma Woodhouse and Georgiana Darcy having £30,000. Miss Bingley has £20,000. Augusta Hawkins, the daughter of a Bristol merchant whom the ambitious Highbury clergyman Mr. Elton proudly brought home from Bath, brought her £10,000 dowry. Catherine Morland, suspected by General Tilney, on the whimsical confidences of John Thorpe, of being a wealthy heiress, then a penniless pauper, has a relatively modest dowry (£3,000) but significantly higher than those of the Dashwood and Bennet ladies.

==== The outsiders ====
Whether they are the main protagonists or secondary characters, unmarried women would have no chance of marrying satisfactorily if money and social position were the only criteria: the Bingley sisters seek to rule out Jane Bennet, as they “may wish for [their brother] [...] to marry a young lady who will bring him fortune, high connections and honors”. Jane Fairfax may be elegant and perfectly educated, but Frank knows she's too poor to be accepted by the proud Mrs Churchill. General Tilney, who warmly welcomed Catherine Morland when he mistook her for a wealthy heiress, drove her away without explanation and wanted Henry to forget her when he thought she was poor.

Jane Austen also introduces penniless manipulators determined to make a place for themselves in society: Lucy Steele, who, through flattery, succeeds in getting herself married to Robert Ferrars and appreciated by his wealthy mother-in-law; Isabella Thorpe, whose coquetry ultimately does her a disservice; or even Penelope Clay, the "dangerous" pretty widow suspected of wanting to be married to Sir Walter, whom Mr. Elliot finally takes with him to London. But she doesn't forget that there are losers: young girls who fail to settle down become honorable spinster daughters, sometimes reduced to misery, like the good but unbearably talkative Hetty Bates. On the other hand, those who married for love sometimes found themselves destitute due to early widowhood, like Mrs Dashwood, or ruined by carelessness and male malpractice, like Mrs Smith, Anne Elliot's friend. Despite their financial difficulties, however, they are not unhappy: Miss Bates's natural generosity and kindness, and Mrs Smith's resilience, enable them to bear their impecuniosity with nobility and fortitude.

==== Inheritance law as a springboard for intrigue ====
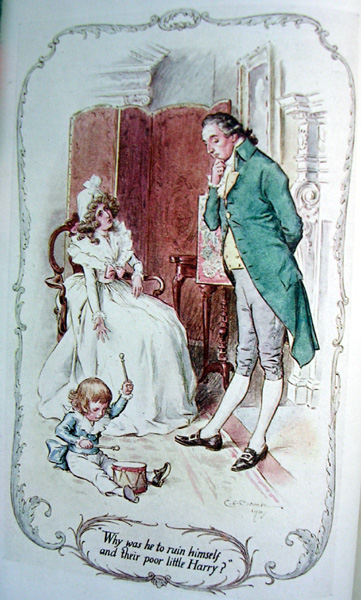
Fanny Dashwood blames her husband for wanting to ruin their child by helping her half-sisters financially (C. E. Brock, 1908).

The problems created by the transmission of inheritance run through most of Jane Austen's novels, and are sometimes at the very heart of the plot, as in Sense and Sensibility. While the birthright was officially abolished in France in 1792, in the UK it remained the norm in the landed gentry: the eldest son, whatever his personal qualities, inherited the estate. Cadets must find another source of income, usually a clerical or military profession, and make a “good” marriage, or remain unmarried. (Note: However, obtaining a clerical income and entering the Royal Navy cadets depended on a patron, and a military office had to be bought. The solution used by Edward Austen (adopted by a wealthy, childless parent), which is used in Emma, remains exceptional.) Daughters, regardless of sibling rank or dowry, had to find husbands of at least equal social status. For a woman from a good family, social downgrading is a very real threat: Frances Price married a penniless naval lieutenant on a whim, who bore her ten children, and it was out of Christian charity as much as concern for the family that her brother-in-law, the wealthy Sir Thomas Bertram, took in Fanny, his eldest daughter, at Mansfield Park, where she was long treated as a poor relation.The five Bennet girls, on the death of their parents, would at best benefit from £40 a year each, as Mr Collins elegantly points out to Elizabeth when asking for her hand in marriage. The situation of Miss Bates, a clergyman's daughter reduced to poverty with her elderly mother, was scarcely worse than that experienced by Jane and Cassandra Austen between 1805 and 1809 after the death of their father, (Note: Jane had no personal income at the time, and Mrs Austen and Cassandra had £210 a year between them, not enough to support three women of good family in Bath.) before finding stability at Chawton Cottage, where they were lodged with their mother by Edward.

Various testamentary provisions existed to prevent the dismemberment of estates or their transfer to foreign hands. The entail, in particular, abolished only in 1925 by the Law of Property Act, made it possible to exclude daughters (destined to marry, and therefore to change their name) from the benefit of an estate, since, in the absence of a direct male heir, the property passed to a more or less distant cousin. Two of Jane Austen's novels (Pride and Prejudice and Persuasion) make use of this entail as a plot device: the financial threat hanging over the heroine forces her to consider a marriage of reason, in order to escape a miserable condition at odds with the life she has known. For the family, moreover, seeing her marry the heir seems an advantageous and socially satisfying solution: admittedly, Elizabeth Bennet at no point considers marrying the Longbourn heir, Mr. Collins, but Anne Elliot is, for a brief moment, tempted to allow herself to be courted by William Elliot and become “the future mistress of Kellynch”, the new Lady Elliot, to revive her mother's spirit.

Even when the estate is not subject to hereditary substitution, the financial situation of the daughters can be difficult when their father dies. In Sense and Sensibility, the senile old Dashwood has passed bare ownership of Norland not to his direct heir (his nephew Henry) but to the latter's son. Henry Dashwood's premature death undermines the social status of his widow and three daughters, who are left at the mercy of John, the son of a first marriage who, under the influence of his wife and despite the promise he made to his father on his deathbed, will not help them financially. In the same novel, Mrs Ferrars, mistress of her husband's fortune, deprives Edward of his birthright when he refuses to marry “the honorable Miss Morton”, the wealthy heiress she has in mind for him. Likewise, Mrs Smith threatens to disinherit her nephew Willoughby if he doesn't settle down. The wealthy owner of Northanger Abbey, General Tilney, banishes his son Henry, guilty in his eyes of wanting to marry a “poor girl”.

=== Vision of family ===
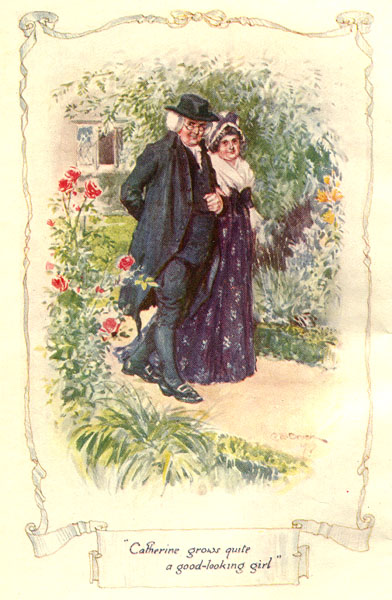
Catherine Morland's honest parents are “ordinary” (C. E. Brock, 1907).

Jane Austen explains her literary approach in her letters (including one from 1814 to her niece Anna Austen): “three or four families in a country village is the very thing to work on”. In each of her novels, she stages a microcosm. There are never many characters around her heroines: just the family and friends who play a part in the story, and the few individuals whom circumstances or events naturally bring them into contact with.

==== The parents ====
In most contemporary novels written by women, such as those of Ann Radcliffe, Maria Edgeworth, and even later writers such as Charlotte Brontë and George Eliot, the heroine is an orphan: it's a convenient way of allowing her to experience adventures that the presence of a father, and especially a mother, would otherwise make impossible. Of course, Jane Austen also uses this writing convenience, but her concern is the representation of plausible, “natural, possible and probable” events and situations. (Note: In a letter to Cassandra dated October 11-12, 1813, she calls Self-Control, Mary Brunton's novel, "an excellently-meant, elegantly-written Work, without anything of Nature or Probability in it. I declare I do not know whether Laura’s passage down the American River, is not the most natural, possible, every-day thing she ever does”) Indeed, she presents “average” parents in Northanger Abbey: Mrs Morland “had three boys before Catherine was born, and instead of dying in childbirth, as anyone might have expected, she was still living, and had even had six more children, whom she saw growing up around her, enjoying perfect health herself”. But this character, even-tempered, simple, honest and full of good sense, is barely sketched in and plays no part in the story.

==== Father figure ====
Many characters in Jane Austen’s novels lack fathers, and several young men serve as heads of households: John Dashwood, Darcy, and Bingley (each responsible for an unmarried sister), Robert Martin, and Mr. Knightley’s tenant farmer in Emma. In Sense and Sensibility, no patriarchal figure is present: the novel begins with the deaths of old Dashwood and, a year later, his nephew Henry, leaving Henry’s widow and three daughters without financial support. Secondary characters such as Mrs. Ferrars and Mrs. Jennings are widows, while the Steele sisters and Willoughby have lost both parents.

Similarly, in Mansfield Park, Henry and Mary Crawford are orphans; in Pride and Prejudice, Darcy and Georgiana’s father died five years prior, as did the parents of the Bingleys, Mr. Collins, and George Wickham. In Emma, Jane Fairfax lacks parents, and in Persuasion, Frederick Wentworth resides with his brother or brother-in-law when establishing himself.

In cases where fathers are present, their roles vary. Mr. Bennet in Pride and Prejudice delegates family responsibilities to others, Mr. Woodhouse in Emma allows his daughter to manage Hartfield, General Tilney in Northanger Abbey prioritizes his own interests and maintains strict control over his household, and Sir Walter Elliot in Persuasion struggles to oversee his estate due to inconsistent decisions and a focus on appearances.

Sir Thomas Bertram in Mansfield Park represents a traditional patriarchal figure. (Note: The name of the estate can also be seen as a way to emphasize its male dominance: man's field.) He oversees his family and plantations in Antigua, where he spends two years away, a period during which his absence affects the household. Upon returning, he reassesses his approach to his daughters’ upbringing.

The portrayal of these absent or varied paternal figures appears in the narratives alongside the family dynamics depicted in each novel.

==== Maternal authority ====
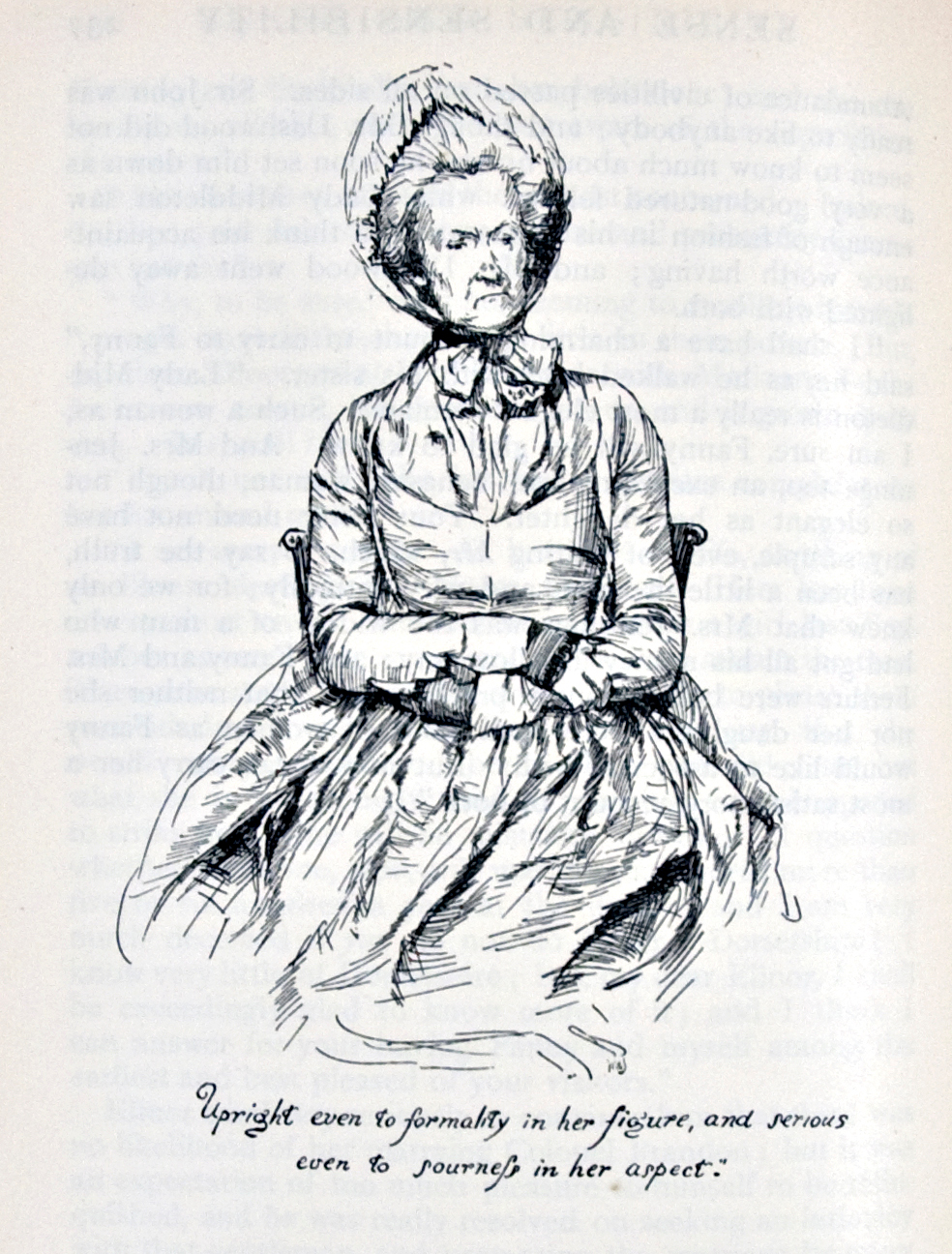
Mrs Ferrars is a stiff and solemn woman, whose severity borders on the bitter (Chris Hammond, 1899).

===== Absence of a mother =====
Novel heroines are traditionally motherless, for a very simple reason, according to Susan Peck: in the society of the time, the power conferred on the mother (motherhood) over her minor daughters is exorbitant, prohibiting any attempt at emancipation; they are kept, until marriage, in a state of submission and ignorance that prevents them from acquiring an independent personality. The presence of an attentive, intelligent mother with the heroine would be the best way to prevent her from maturing, “and thus disrupt the actantial scheme and upset the balance of the novel”. (Note: Susan Peck wrote: "The absence of mothers [...] seems [...] to derive [...] from the almost revent her daughter's trials from occurring, to shield her from the process of maturation, and thus to disrupt the focus and equilibrium of the novel")

In Jane Austen, only two heroines have lost their mother: Emma Woodhouse and Anne Elliot. Mrs. Woodhouse “had died too long ago for her to have more than an indistinct remembrance of her caresses” and Lady Elliot, whom the narrator presents as a “remarkable, intelligent and amiable woman”, died when Anne was 14, leaving her at a loss when faced with choices: at nineteen, she allows herself to be guided by Lady Russell, who embodies the absent mother figure, but she later regrets having followed her advice. Emma Woodhouse is too self-confident to admit that she needs advice, and it's Mr. Knightley who sees her mother's absence as detrimental, convinced that in her mother she has lost the only person able to cope with her.

===== Tyranic or inadequate figures =====
The absence of a father often leads to a society dominated by widowed heads of household. When wealthy, these women are sometimes tempted to wield authoritarian control over the young men in their lives. For instance, the cantankerous Mrs. Ferrars seeks to impose her choice of a wife on her eldest son, while the pretentious Lady Catherine attempts to do the same with her nephew, Mr. Darcy — though his financial independence allows him to resist. In contrast, Willoughby, who depends on his aunt Mrs. Smith, is dismissed by her when she learns of his misconduct. On the other hand, widows of more modest means, like Mrs. Dashwood, tend to support their children’s aspirations, albeit sometimes in awkward or imperfect ways.

There's no shortage of inept mothers: Mrs Dashwood, who pays little heed to the practical problems of everyday life, is unreasonably indulgent towards the reckless Marianne, her second daughter, and undervalues her eldest, the wise Elinor; Mrs. Price, worn out by motherhood and hard living, manages her household in a “slow affair”, while her sister, Lady Bertram, languid and indolent, relies candorously on the people around her and lets the pernicious Mrs. Norris run the house and spoil her daughters; Mrs. Bennet, foolish and self-centered, has a behavior that causes, albeit unintentionally, the greatest harm to her daughters.

Sometimes the heroines are lucky enough to have surrogate mothers, but if Mrs. Gardiner is a model of responsible parenting for her nieces, Lady Russell is blinded by her social pride and caste prejudices, and Miss Taylor, Emma Woodhouse's governess and later friend, has always been too gentle to have any power over her.

===== Childs =====
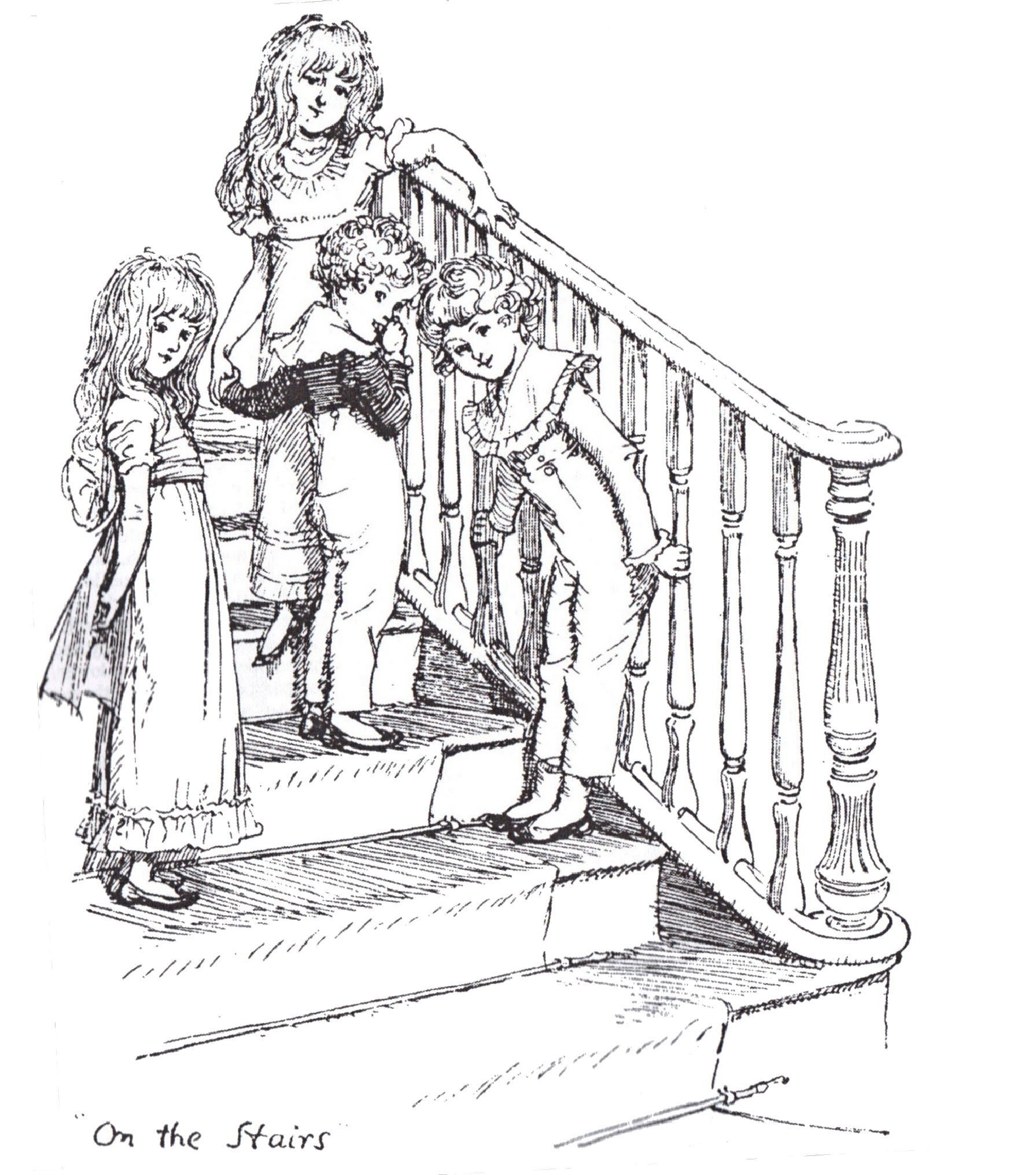
The Gardiners have four young children (Hugh Thomson, 1894).

====== Small families ======
Younger children eventually appear, but only in relation to their role in advancing the plots, as seen in particular in Sense and Sensibility for young Margaret, who, at fourteen, is unable to keep a secret and embarrasses her sister Elinor by mentioning Edward's existence in public; little Harry, whose childishness has lured old Dashwood into passing on the family estate for his benefit; the Middleton children, who give Lucy Steele the opportunity to show off for their mother; not forgetting Charlotte's baby, who causes the Palmers to leave Cleveland in a hurry, lest Marianne's illness be contagious. Similarly, in Mansfield Park, the reader discovers, during Fanny Price's exile in Portsmouth, that her younger brothers, Tom and Charles, are noisy and unobedient, and that Betsey, the youngest, is too spoiled.

If, in these two books, the author presents incompetent mothers and young children whom the narrator judges rather harshly, in the other novels she considers their behavior more indulgently, but without ever falling into sentimentality: the Gardiners form a happy family with their four children, as do the Morlands, who have ten, and the families around Emma Woodhouse: Isabella and John Knightley, who already have five, and the Westons, to whom a little girl is born. Anne Elliot, for her part, is happy to have the excuse of looking after young Charles Musgrove, her injured nephew, to avoid meeting Captain Wentworth, her former fiancé.

===== Relations between siblings =====
In general, the heroine can rely, to varying degrees, on the love of her family (Northanger Abbey) or at least a sister (Pride and Prejudice, Sense and Sensibility), or even a brother and cousin (Mansfield Park).

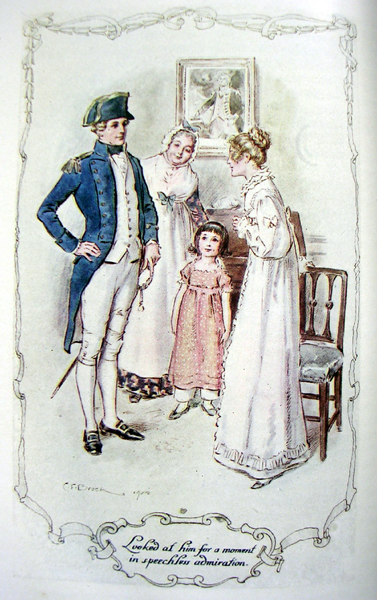
Fanny, speechless with emotion, admires William in his brand-new lieutenant's uniform (C. E. Brock, 1908).

Relationships between sisters, in particular, are developed in several novels. These sisters, though of very different characters, are very close: often the older sister is calmer, the younger more lively. In Pride and Prejudice, where Jane and Elizabeth Bennet form a close-knit fraternal couple, and Kitty and Lydia a more conflicted one, the two eldest sisters, mirroring the deep affection that united the two Austen sisters, complement, support and rely on each other, offering one of the finest examples of female friendship in late 18th and early 19th-century romance literature. The pairing of Elinor and Marianne Dashwood in Sense and Sensibility is not unlike that of Jane and Elizabeth, but here the dramatic action revolves around the relationship between the two sisters and the perfect parallelism of their sentimental adventures. Fanny Price, when she leaves Mansfield Park to return to her paternal family in Portmouth, is happy to find in her younger sister Susan a companion after her own heart, and to make her a friend. However, it was with William, her eldest by a year and her confidant, that she established a very strong bond, and then, once at Mansfield Park, Edmund Bertram quickly became for the lonely little girl an older brother (he was six years older than her) as beloved as William.

However, Catherine Morland's fraternal ties with her very large family are not detailed, and Emma's heroine's ties with her older sister are rather ineffectual; but they are deep ties. Anne Elliot, on the other hand, so unappreciated by her own family - which makes her the loneliest of Jane Austen's heroines - can only look with sympathy on the affection shown to each other by her younger sisters-in-law Henrietta and Louisa Musgrove.

===== Family by blood and family by heart =====
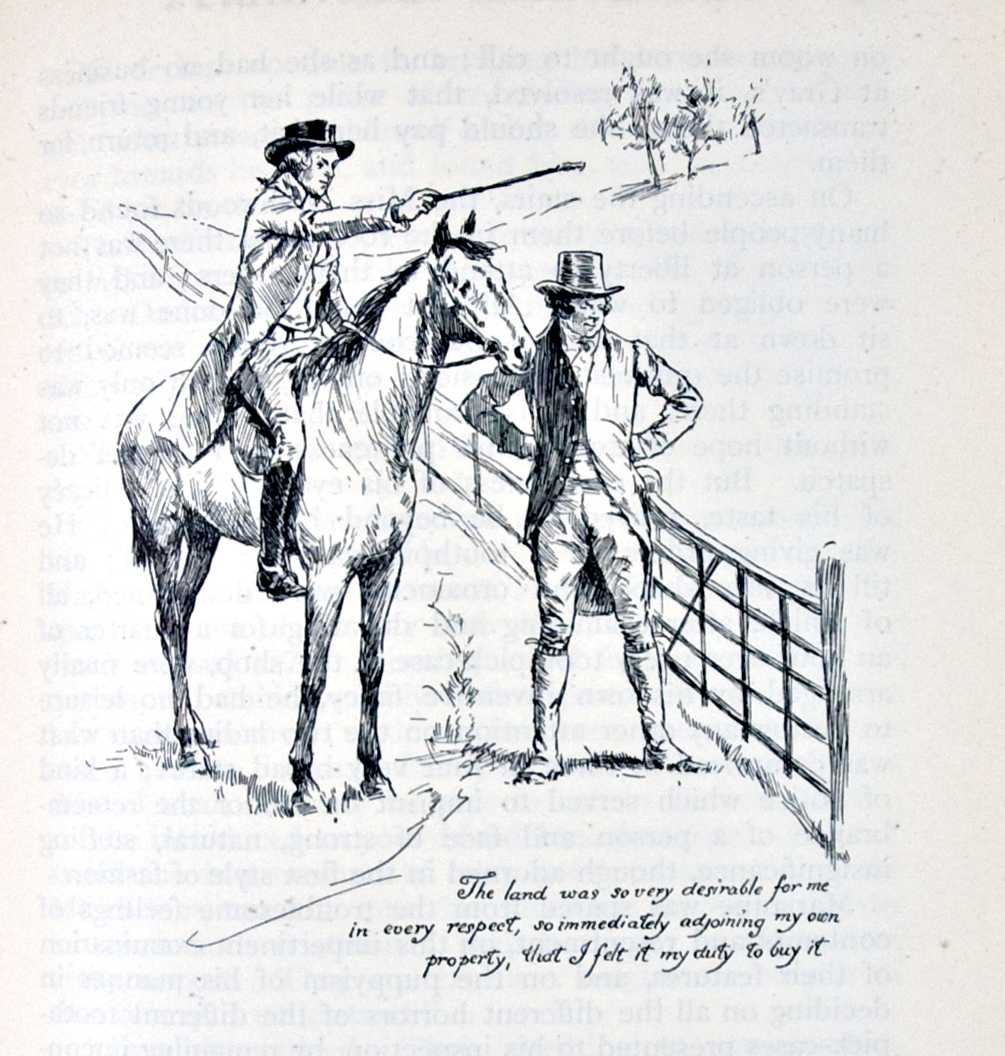
For John Dashwood, enlarging Norland, even at the expense of his neighbors, was considered a “duty” (Chris Hammond, 1899).

From her very first novel, Jane Austen contrasts two conceptions of the family: the conservative conception, solely interested in the transmission of the name and the improvement of the estate from generation to generation, embodied by John Dashwood, and the family as a human group, represented by the Dashwood girls and their mother, exiled from Norland because they are women and therefore destined to change their names. Two other characters are exclusively attached to these aristocratic values: Lady Catherine and Sir Walter. Lady Catherine de Bourgh, particularly attentive to the notion of rank, connections and fortune, wishes to unite her daughter and nephew to strengthen the ancestral ties of their two “houses” and further consolidate the power of their families by combining their fortunes, which “on both sides is magnificent”. Sir Walter Elliot takes refuge in the narcissistic and sterile contemplation, in Baronetage, of the words that spell out in black and white his name and properties: ELLIOT OF KELLYNCH-HALL, but he is incapable of assuming the moral responsibilities they imply.

As for Pemberley, the Darcy ancestral estate, it's the only place where the two meanings of the word family - social and domestic - blend harmoniously. Of course, Mansfield Park is also a place of elegance, savoir-vivre, regular habits and harmony, but most of its inhabitants have too many faults, and Sir Thomas, the rigid guardian of conservative traditions, is also a slave owner in the West Indies. The Bertram family, badly shaken by the scandal of Maria's adultery and Julia's flight to Gretna Green, finally looks to Fanny Price for serenity; on her return from Portsmouth, welcomed by her uncle as a true daughter of the house, she can finally call Mansfield Park her true home. In reality, the price of Pemberley is less the material wealth it generates (the £10,000 income) than its social and moral value. It is, in Jane Austen's eyes, the symbol and domain of “true” values, where the relationship between the owner and his servants, both domestic and tenant, is particularly benevolent; it becomes the home where Elizabeth Bennet will find the “comfort, elegance and intimacy of family life”, and the center where Darcy and Elizabeth welcome those deemed worthy to be part of their family.

It is in Persuasion that the concept of family, in its domestic sense, truly comes to the fore. The novel contrasts the Elliots of Kellynch Hall—Sir Walter, his eldest daughter Elizabeth, and, to a lesser extent, the youngest daughter Mary Musgrove—who are vain, preoccupied with sterile conventions and the recognition of their social rank, with the Musgroves of Uppercross, where cozy comfort, affection, and joie de vivre prevail. While Mr. and Mrs. Musgrove may lack elegance and refinement, they genuinely desire their daughters’ happiness. As for Anne Elliot, her marriage to Frederick Wentworth integrates her into the close-knit and affectionate community of sailors. By distancing herself from her blood relatives, who are trapped in cold, futile relationships devoid of warmth, Anne finds a chosen family among individuals whose sincerity and kindness she values. Her personal evolution mirrors the broader shift in English society toward prioritizing domestic values over the rigid importance traditionally placed on the “genealogical” family.

==== Marriage ====
===== A central theme =====
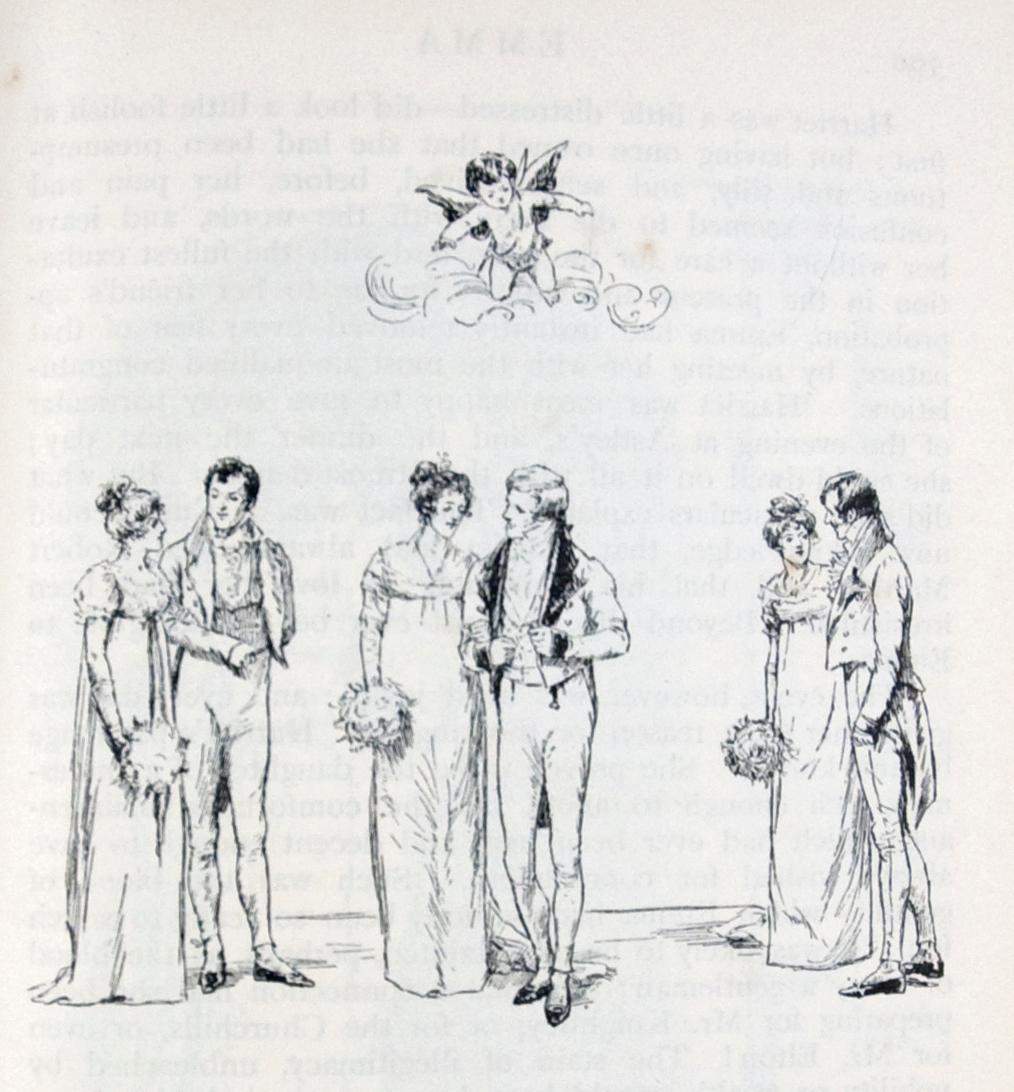
The plot of Emma, which ends in three happy marriages, presents a wide range of matrimonial situations (Chris Hammond, 1898).

Marriage is the central theme of all Jane Austen’s novels, which, like fairy tales, 18th-century sentimental romances, and comedies of manners, typically conclude with a love match. However, Austen does not write sentimental novels, even though her most famous work, Pride and Prejudice, is often regarded as the epitome of the romance genre. Rooted in the literary tradition of the 18th century, she avoids a romanticized view of love. Instead, she challenges two common literary tropes: the ideal of love at first sight and the notion that one can only love once. She is also cautious about passionate love, favouring instead a “reasonable” love - a deep yet rational attachment grounded in mutual esteem and tenderness. While she critiques arranged marriages, which were the norm in her time, and even satirizes unions based solely on wealth, which were widely accepted by her contemporaries, she maintains that love, though paramount, cannot exist independently of financial stability. For a marriage to succeed, Austen suggests, there must be a harmonious balance between affection and practical considerations.

The subject sparked debate among both conservative writers (such as Hannah More, Jane West, Hugh Blair, and James Fordyce) and advocates of women’s emancipation (like Mary Hays and Mary Wollstonecraft), who criticized the precarious position of women in the rigidly structured Georgian society. Under common law, women were not recognized as independent individuals and were typically subject to male authority, whether from a father, brother, or husband, leaving them financially dependent. Unmarried women were often devalued, as the status of a married woman was considered superior. Since inheritance was almost always passed to male heirs, women could face legal disadvantages. In this uncertain social climate, a “good” marriage was often the only means for women to secure or maintain a respectable position in society and avoid financial hardship, particularly during the economically unstable 1790s. Encouraged by their mothers to actively seek suitable husbands by showcasing their beauty and accomplishments on the "marriage market", young women of marriageable age also had to carefully consider the social standing and financial stability of potential suitors.

===== An idea of happiness =====
Jane Austen thus presents the various behaviors of her social class through a number of married secondary characters, as if she had wanted to show, and prioritize, all the scenarios open to a young girl of marriageable age: marriages based solely on amorous passion and ultimately unsatisfying, which she describes as “imprudent” marriages, such as those of Mr. Bennet, Mrs. Price and even Mr. Weston's first; marriages for money, which are unhappy for General Tilney's wife, or unhappy for Mr. Elliot's wife; marriages of convenience, not very fulfilling, like those of many secondary characters, the Middletons, the Palmers, the Hursts or even Charles and Mary Musgrove; happy marriages, finally, based on mutual affection and respect, sentimentally and intellectually balanced, economically viable, which she considers the ideal to achieve: that of the Gardiners, the Westons or the Crofts, whom she offers as an example to her heroines.

What is ultimately essential for all these heroines is their personal fulfillment, free from ambitious or materialistic considerations. While Jane Austen assures readers that their married lives will be happy, she deliberately avoids detailing the day-to-day realities of their unions. Instead, she suggests that, at the end of their physical and emotional journeys, their marriages will lead to the creation of a harmonious “living together” within a new community that aligns more closely with their vision of happiness. In every case, the strength and depth of the protagonists’ union are further reinforced by the friendships they cultivate with other members of their community.

== Posterity of Jane Austen's universe ==
=== Reception in French-speaking countries: a long misunderstanding ===
In the English-speaking world, Jane Austen’s popular image exists separately from her long-established reputation as one of Britain’s greatest writers, developing in parallel yet distinct trajectories. In contrast, her standing in the French-speaking world has remained more ambiguous and less clearly defined. Her novels challenged the categories that 19th-century French literary critics, who often prioritized the romancier (novelist of ideas) over the romancière (novelist of domestic and social themes), considered “great literature.” Additionally, the translations of her works published during the 19th and 20th centuries often presented a distorted or diluted version of her writing. Valérie Cossy of the University of Lausanne notes that these early translations, which were overly “polished” or sentimental, contributed to her being perceived as a minor author, a “romantic” and somewhat saccharine novelist writing primarily for a female audience.

It wasn't until the last quarter of the 20th century that Christian Bourgois included her in its foreign literature catalog, and academic critics began to take an interest in her; (Note: Pierre Goubert, author of Jane Austen, une étude psychologique de la romancière (1975) [Jane Austen, a psychological study of the writer] and editor of its publication in the Pléiade, is considered the master of Austenian studies in France.) and it wasn't until 2000 that Volume I of her Œuvres romanesques, including her three early novels, appeared in the Bibliothèque de la Pléiade. (Note: Chronological presentation: Northanger Abbey, Sense and Sensibility, Pride and Prejudice (plus Lady Susan, The Watsons and two early works in the Appendices)) From then on, Jane Austen gained literary recognition in the French-speaking world, and was established as a “serious” author. (Note: Volume II, with the mature novels Mansfield Park, Emma and Persuasion, was not published until October 17, 2013. Prior to this, however, a new translation of Pride and Prejudice was published by Gallimard in Folio Classique in 2007, and a translation of Persuasion in 2011, both by Pierre Goubert.) Translations of her works took a more academic turn, but commentaries still struggled to explore her humor and irony.

Title page of the 1932 French translation of Pride and Prejudice.

However, Jane Austen’s public image remains ambiguous. For instance, in the October 26, 2012 issue of Elle magazine, Isabelle Bour highlighted an article titled “Joue-la comme Jane Austen” (Play it like Jane Austen), subtitled: “Pour trouver l'âme sœur, mieux que Meetic, il y a la méthode victorienne” (To find your soulmate, better than Meetic, there's the Victorian method). Furthermore, alongside the few recent translations published in “classic” paperback collections, which aim to be more faithful to the original texts, (Note: Folio classique for Pride and Prejudice, Sense and Sensibility, Persuasion (Pierre Goubert), GF-Flammarion and Le Livre de poche classique for two other translations of Pride and Prejudice.) older (and royalty-free) translations, tailored to what publishers once considered “French taste”, continue to be reissued with new covers. For example, L’Archipel capitalized on the success of film adaptations of Austen’s novels to reprint Isabelle de Montolieu’s 1996 translation, Raison et Sensibilité ou les deux manières d'aimer (Sense and Sensibility or the Two Ways of Loving). Similarly, in 1997, they reissued Henri Villemain’s Mansfield Park ou les trois cousines as Mansfield Park and an anonymous 1816 translation, La Nouvelle Emma ou les Caractères anglais du siècle, as Emma. These were republished by Archipoche in 2006, 2007, and 2009, respectively. The 1932 translation by Valentine Leconte and Charlotte Pressoir, Les Cinq filles de Mrs Bennet, though elegant, is notable for omitting entire paragraphs. It remains available from 10/18 and has been reprinted in other editions under the title Orgueil et Préjugés. Valérie Cossy observes that “Jane Austen is the only foreign author in La Pléiade to be treated so poorly in French,” while Lucile Trunel, who dedicated her 2008 doctoral thesis to the French editions of Austen’s works, argues that this literary genius “remains unjustly overlooked by those who read her in French translation.” In L'Encyclopédie visuelle Jane Austen (The Jane Austen visual Encyclopedia), Gwen Giret and Claire Saim state that translations emphasize the sentimental side, where the main themes are essentially material concerns, the love story and its happy ending.

=== Adaptations and tributes ===
The writings of what Virginia Woolf called “a mistress of much deeper emotion than appears upon the surface” fired the imagination of enthusiastic readers, the Janeites. Pride and Prejudice in particular has been, and still is, the subject of stage adaptations and musicals ever since Mary Steele MacKaye's 1922 adaptation.

Jane Austen's novels, in particular Pride and Prejudice, have also inspired many tributes, as diverse as John Kessel's short story Pride and Prometheus and P. D. James's crime novel Death Comes to Pemberley. Even Jeffrey Eugenides, in The Marriage Plot (2011), refers to the plot and theme of Jane Austen's novels as “impossible to adapt today”.

Especially since the 1990s, screen adaptations of the novels have made it possible to discover or rediscover Jane Austen's work, and have generated a host of derivative works revolving essentially around the characters of Pride and Prejudice, (Note: For example Mr. Darcy Diary by Amanda Grange (translated into French in 2012), Fitzwilliam Darcy, Gentleman, (three volumes, 2003, 2004, 2005) by Pamela Aidan (translated into French in 2013), Charlotte Collins by Jennifer Becton, Caroline Bingley by the same author.) written by people feeling the need to "expand on the world, the characters and the stories, that she created". This “para-Austenian literature” uses Austenian canvases and canons, but tends more often towards the conformism and clichés of the sentimental novel than towards the irony and elegance of Austen's style.

==== Television and film adaptations ====
Although the cinema took hold of Pride and Prejudice in 1940, it was not until 1995-1996, with the possibility of filming in natural settings, that adaptations proliferated.

- In 1995, on television: Orgueil et Préjugés (script by Andrew Davies) and Persuasion (Roger Michell), and on film: Emma Thompson's Raison et Sentiments, followed by Amy Heckerling's Clueless (transposition of Emma to a Beverly Hills high school).
- 1996 saw the release of Douglas McGrath's Emma on film and Diarmuid Lawrence's Emma for television.

The questions raised by Jane Austen are still relevant today, as the variety of origins of films adapted from her novels suggests. Thus, in 2000, Kandukondain Kandukondain, a musical film inspired as much by the novel Sense and Sensibility as by Ang Lee's film version, was released in Tamil. In 2004, Gurinder Chadha's Bride & Prejudice obeys certain Bollywood codes. In 2012, Rama Burshtein's Israeli film Fill the Void describes the world of Jane Austen, with its “clear, rigid rules” and its characters “not looking for a way out, but for a way to live”.

A second film adaptation of Pride and Prejudice, directed by Joe Wright, was released in the United States in 2005, followed by a remake of Persuasion directed by Adrian Shergold in 2007, and a BBC adaptation of Emma, based on a screenplay by Sandy Welch, in 2009. Since the 1960s, the creators of these adaptations, often categorized as heritage films, costume dramas, or period dramas, have sought to incorporate “authentic” details to recreate the atmosphere of the era. This reflects a nostalgic longing for a historical period and lifestyle that, while idealized and often romanticized, remains largely a fantasy, as highlighted by the 2008 documentary Lost in Austen.

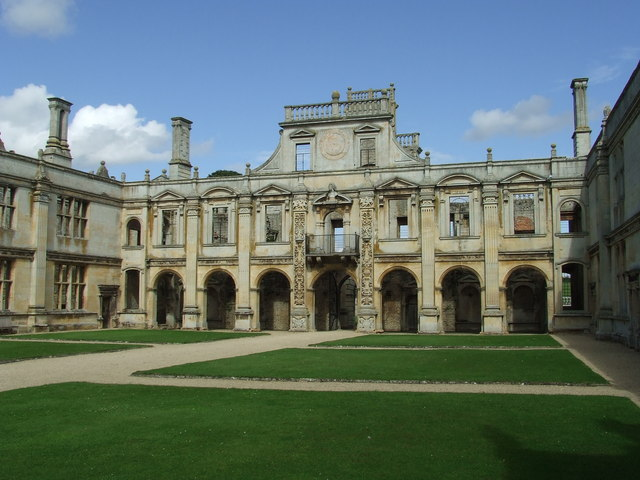
For Patricia Rozema, Kirby Hall symbolizes the moral ruin of Mansfield Park

Jane Austen’s works are frequently adapted for the screen because they contain timeless elements that can be easily modernized. However, many adaptations tend to emphasize a romanticism that is largely absent from the original novels. For example, Pride and Prejudice: A Latter-Day Comedy, released in the United States in 2003, leans into the chick lit genre, while the 2005 film adaptation focuses on the love story, presenting a romanticized vision more reminiscent of the Brontës than of Austen. Since 1995, adaptations have embraced sentimentality, often concluding with the protagonists sharing a kiss, (Note: Deleted in the European version, the denouement of the 2005 American version of Pride and Prejudice shows Darcy and Elizabeth as lovers in the Pemberley night.) aligning with audience expectations and reinforcing a romanticized interpretation of her works. However, adaptations such as Patricia Rozema’s 1999 version of Mansfield Park have been less successful with general audiences. This adaptation, infused with gothic and feminist themes, presents itself as an “exercise in irreverent post-colonial style,” offering a postmodern reinterpretation of Austen’s novel. In this version, Mansfield Park is depicted as half in ruins, and Sir Thomas is portrayed as an ambiguous, even menacing and violent character.

===== Processing in adaptations =====
The original novels were often read by a limited audience, so filmmakers frequently draw inspiration from earlier visual adaptations, which are typically more widely recognized than the written source material. This creates a subtle interplay of intertextuality, filled with nods to an informed and complicit audience. For instance, Hugh Grant’s plunge into the lake in Bridget Jones’s Diary references Colin Firth’s iconic “wet shirt” scene from the 1995 Pride and Prejudice series.

===== A particular case =====
The multiplication of adaptations (in particular, more than a dozen costume dramas since 1938 on television) and their spread over time give the characters, embodied by actors, another dimension that provides information on the evolution of mentalities and public expectations, as shown by the diachronic study of the four adaptations of Pride and Prejudice still accessible, between 1940 and 2005.

===== Pride and Prejudice (1940) =====
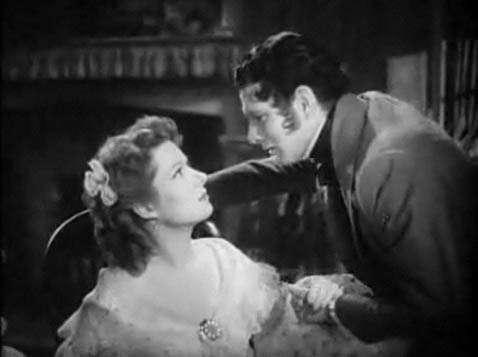
Darcy's first proposal in Pride and Prejudice, 1940

The 1940 version, based not on the novel but on a successful stage adaptation, emphasizes the social difference between the characters: Darcy (Laurence Olivier) is a haughty aristocrat who sees no need to be amiable in society, and Elizabeth (Greer Garson) is a glib provincial middle-class girl. The comic side of the secondary characters is accentuated, but the psychology of the main characters is not deepened; because of the rapidity of the action, usual in screwball comedies, the change of attitude of the two protagonists is a flip-flop, and the resolution of the problems is totally lacking in verisimilitude.

Pride and Prejudice (1980)

The 1980 adaptation, which presents Elizabeth's point of view exclusively, emphasizes two elements of the novel: the heroine's deep attachment to her family and the importance of the theme of marriage. Shot mainly in the studio, it suffers from a slightly too static mise-en-scène, but the script is generally considered to be particularly faithful.

Elizabeth Garvie plays an intelligent, stubborn Elizabeth, rather sedate and composed; David Rintoul's physique accentuates the haughty, taciturn, frozen air of a Darcy who speaks with an air of constraint and whose gaze Elizabeth interprets negatively: he remains, practically to the end, for her, and therefore for the viewer, a distant, indecipherable character.

Pride and Prejudice (1995)

The 1995 adaptation, in contrast, expands on Darcy’s role, with added scenes revealing a complexity of character that is only hinted at in the novel. The visual medium is used to incorporate symbolic gestures: early on, Colin Firth is often filmed in profile or gazing out from a window, conveying Darcy’s disinterest, or even disdain, for the society around him. His predatory gaze as he observes Elizabeth suggests a sense of objectification. However, after their encounter at Pemberley, the gaze transforms into a means of communication. While the novel relies on Elizabeth’s internal reflections and the narrator’s commentary, the “cinematic narration” conveys these shifts through visual cues.

Jennifer Ehle portrays Elizabeth as an unconventional heroine, full of vitality and with a subtly sensual presence. Darcy’s initial reluctance to engage in conversation underscores the power Elizabeth holds over him, ultimately teaching him to change his perspective. This is most evident in the final scene, where he laughs openly, a moment that symbolizes his transformation. The adaptation offers a decidedly feminist interpretation of the story.

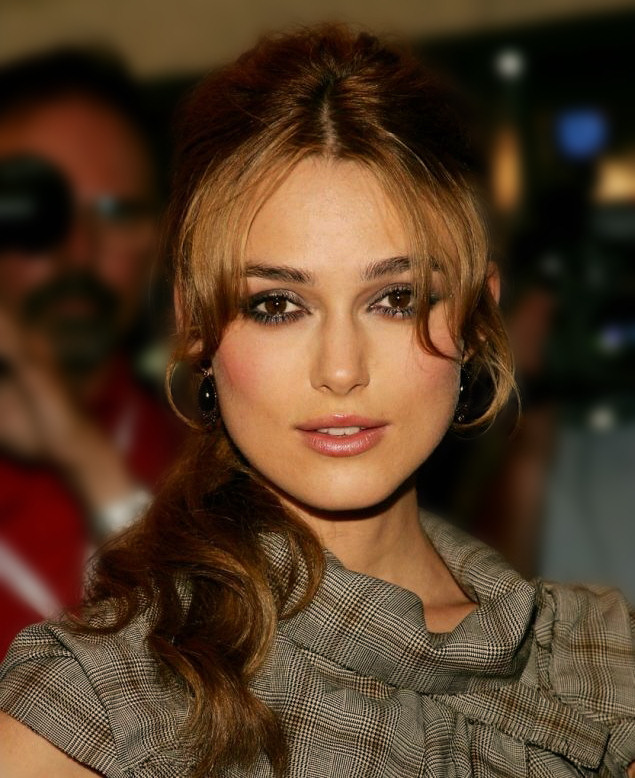
Keira Knightley is Elizabeth Bennet in Pride & Prejudice, 2005.

Pride and Prejudice (2005)

In 2005, aware of the influence of the 1995 mini-series, Joe Wright conceived his film in part as a reaction to it: the story is set in 1797 (the year in which First Impressions was written) rather than 1813 (the year of publication); it is refocused on Elizabeth, the sexual attraction is amplified, the language modernized. Keira Knightley plays Elizabeth with a decidedly youthful, provocative and sensual air, and Matthew Macfadyen plays a romantic hero à la Byron. (Note: Pride and Prejudice took part in the Teen Choice Awards, demonstrating that the film is aimed at a younger audience than the usual heritage film audience)

The film also takes liberties with the symbolic uses of landscapes and interiors in the eponymous novel, but Joe Wright admits he didn't strive for fidelity. Here, the elements (rain, storm, dawn) and gestures (Darcy's clenched fist) illustrate the characters' deepest feelings in an expressionistic way.

==== The problem of male protagonists ====
In the novels, the male characters remain relatively self-effacing, the heroines' personality and point of view being privileged. There's nothing heroic about the perfect gentlemen who eventually win their hand; they're men of duty, used to controlling and masking their feelings. Also, since social spheres are compartmentalized, opportunities for young men and women to meet are highly codified “social occasions”, where strict etiquette and decorum forbid any outbursts. This is why scriptwriters reconstruct love stories by setting up a network of charismatic heroes, worthy of the heroines, and inventing scenes to compensate for their reserve: modern viewers need to see a hero who must prove himself worthy of winning the heroine's love. Screenwriters often give male protagonists a more prominent role, as seen in Andrew Davies’ portrayal of Colin Firth’s Darcy, creating a balance between male and female characters that aligns with the sentimental expectations of a predominantly female audience. In film adaptations, in particular, these male characters are frequently transformed into romantic, even glamorous figures. For example, Jeremy Northam’s Mr. Knightley in Douglas McGrath’s Emma is notably rejuvenated, while Alan Rickman’s Colonel Brandon in Ang Lee’s adaptation becomes Christopher Brandon, reciting poetry to a captivated Marianne, played by Kate Winslet. American scholar Deborah Kaplan describes this trend as the “harlequinization” of Austen’s works, adapting them to appeal to mainstream tastes.

Seducers and libertines are often portrayed in a less sympathetic light to strip away the charm that makes them formidable rivals to the heroes in the novels. For example, in the 1995 adaptation, Emma Thompson’s screenplay explicitly prevents Willoughby from justifying himself to Elinor. Similarly, while Adrian Lukis’ portrayal of Wickham in the same year presents him as a charming yet unscrupulous seducer, Rupert Friend’s interpretation in the 2005 film gives Wickham a more unsettling quality, described as having “the reptilian charm of a handsome sociopath.”

==== Scenery processing ====
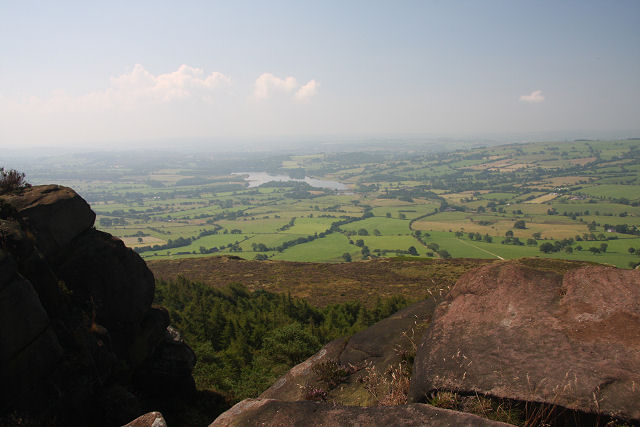
The landscape admired from The Roaches by Elizabeth, the aesthetic concept of the picturesque in Pride and Prejudice 1995.

From the moment when most of the plots were shot on natural sets (as early as 1981's Sense and Sensibility), landscapes and dwellings gained in importance: having a greater presence in the visual media than in the novels, they became essential elements in understanding the story. But it's in 1995 that the pre-eminence of landscape and panoramas is affirmed: the differences between the places of residence (Norland - Barton Cottage; Longbourn - Pemberley) were emphasized. Gerry Scott, chief set designer for Pride and Prejudice 1995, asserted the team's desire to give the English landscape a real role in the film; Elizabeth contemplates Derbyshire from a lofty vantage point, from The Roaches in the Peak District in the 1995 version, and from the dizzy heights of the Hathersage Moors at Stanage Edge in the 2005 version, metaphorically appropriating Darcy's county.

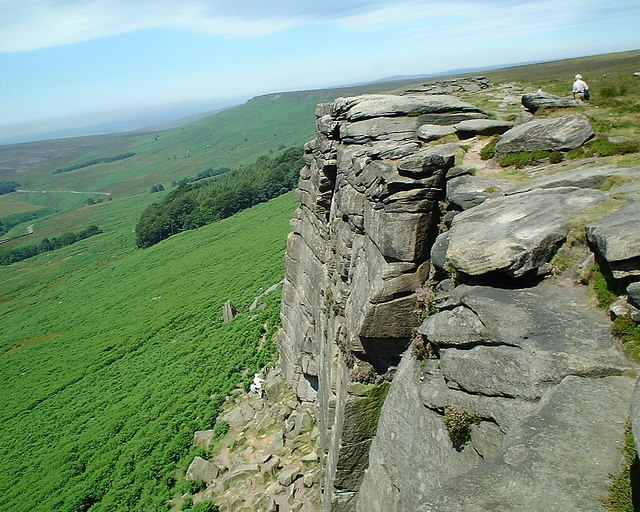
Stanage Edge website for Pride and Prejudice 2005, aesthetic concept of the sublime

The landscapes present the classic, mythical image of a bucolic, timeless England (Englishness), as seen by audiences of all nationalities. The filming locations, which are part of Britain's historical heritage and often managed by the National Trust, are chosen to best match the homes they are meant to represent, offering a highly realistic, if not faithful, image of the world in which Jane Austen set her plots, and making the BBC series in particular not just costum dramas but heritage films.

Tourist guides mention these films to attract visitors, creating a kind of “film tourism”: for example, a guide to film locations (Movie Locations: A Guide to Britain and Ireland) was published in 2000. Hampshire has published a brochure (Literary Hampshire) for tourists wishing to follow in the footsteps of their favorite authors. Lyme Park saw a marked increase in visitors after 1995, and the locations used for Pride and Prejudice 2005 still bear traces of the film: costumes at Burghley House (Rosings), Darcy's bust at Chatsworth House (Pemberley). As for Bath, which Jane disliked but where she lived and set major scenes in Northanger Abbey and Persuasion, since 2001 it has hosted an annual Jane Austen Festival in September.

=== Image representation ===
==== Illustrations ====
The first illustrations appeared in France as early as 1821: the illustrated frontispieces of each of the two volumes of La Famille Elliot, Isabelle de Montolieu's “free translation” of Persuasion into French. But it wasn't until 1833 and Richard Bentley's edition that an English edition of Jane Austen's novels with frontispiece illustrations was seen: Pickering's drawings were engraved by Greatbach for Pride and Prejudice, illustrating the confrontation between Lady Catherine and Elizabeth Bennet and the revelation to Mr. Bennet of what Darcy had done for Lydia. Northanger Abbey, with Catherine reading, and Emma are similarly illustrated. It wasn't until the publication in 1869 of A Memoir of Jane Austen by her nephew, James Edward Austen-Leigh, that a real interest in the work was born. The first popular editions, available in 1883, were soon followed by illustrated editions and collections. The public craze of the 1880s was dubbed “Austenolatry” by Virginia Woolf's father, writer and critic Leslie Stephen.

The six novels published by MacMillan in 1890 are lavishly illustrated with pen-and-ink drawings by Hugh Thomson, who also illustrated Pride and Prejudice in George Allen's 1894 edition. In addition to depicting the most emblematic scenes, he focused on secondary characters and scenes, sometimes sketched with irony, adding humorous or symbolic (Note: For example, on page 221 of the edition referenced in the note, the end of Darcy's letter is illustrated by a sword (he “demands justice”) thrust into the initials I(f) of the following chapter; Elizabeth's reflections are symbolized by the scales she holds in her right hand as she reads the letter) vignettes and chapter headers, particularly in the 1894 edition.

Following in his footsteps, C. E. Brock illustrated numerous editions in pen and watercolor, adapting the style of his vignettes to the edition they accompanied. His approach could be refined, even mannered and slightly anachronistic, since "sensitive to the conception of the first Victorian novelists, showing the feminine delicacy and the somewhat collared side, with cup of tea and saucer in hand", but elsewhere he is more virile and sober, as shown in these two editions of Persuasion:

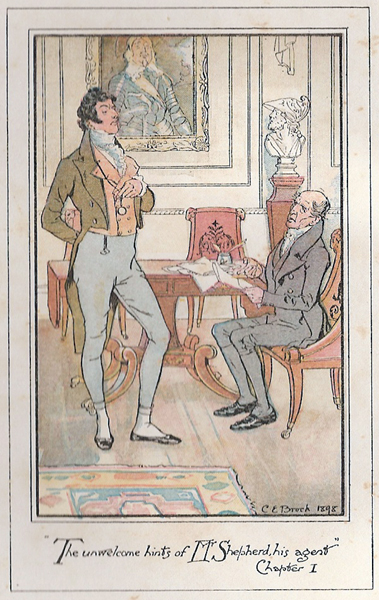
C. E. Brock (1898): Sir Walter takes a dim view of the notary's thrifty advice (ch.1)

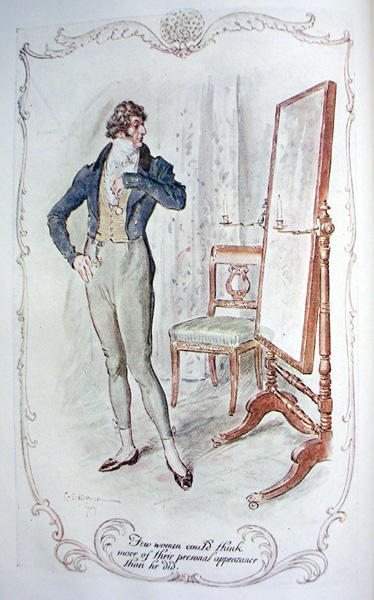
C. E. Brock (1909): Sir Walter is particularly pleased with his own image (ch.1)

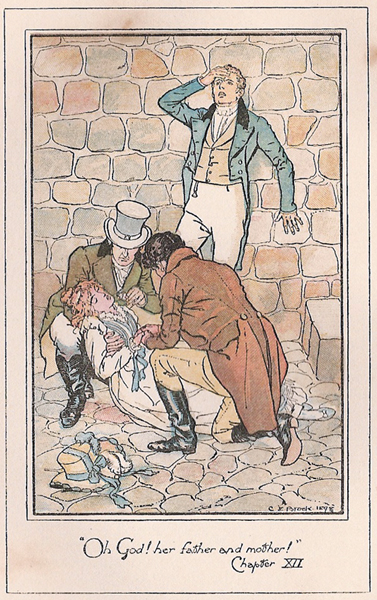
C. E. Brock (1898): Louisa's fall on the Cob (ch.12)

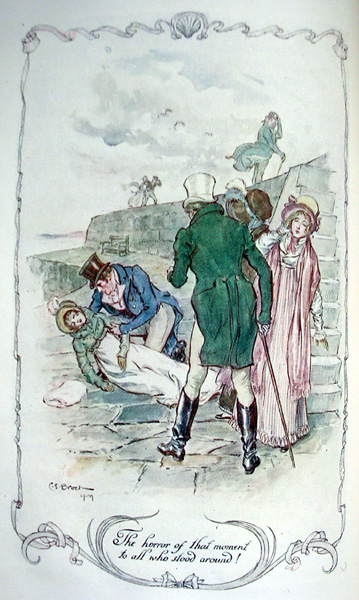
C. E. Brock (1909): Louisa's fall on the Cob (ch.12)

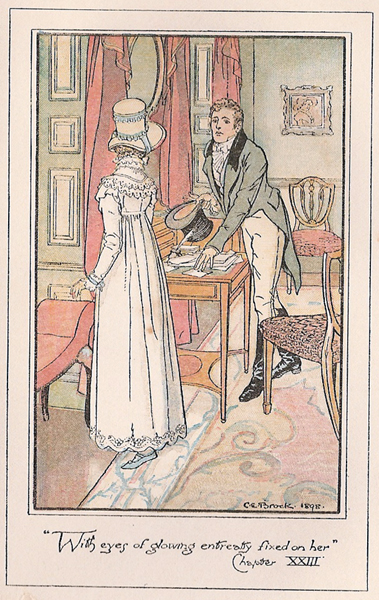
C. E. Brock (1898): Frederick draws Anne's attention to his letter (ch.23)

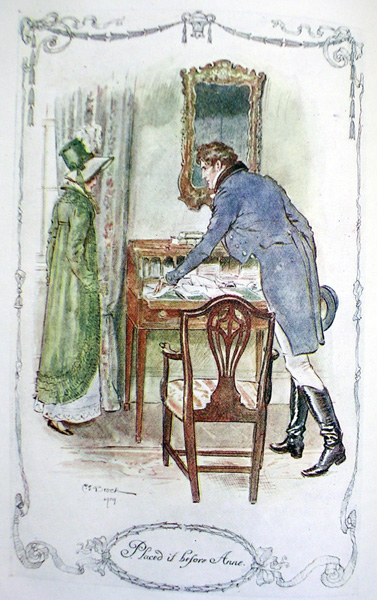
C. E. Brock (1909): Frederick shows Anne the letter he had just written (ch.23)

The English Regency period was a favorite subject of the Pre-Raphaelites, and in particular of the painter Edmund Blair Leighton. Many of his genre scenes evoke the world of “Good Aunt Jane” as seen in Victorian times:

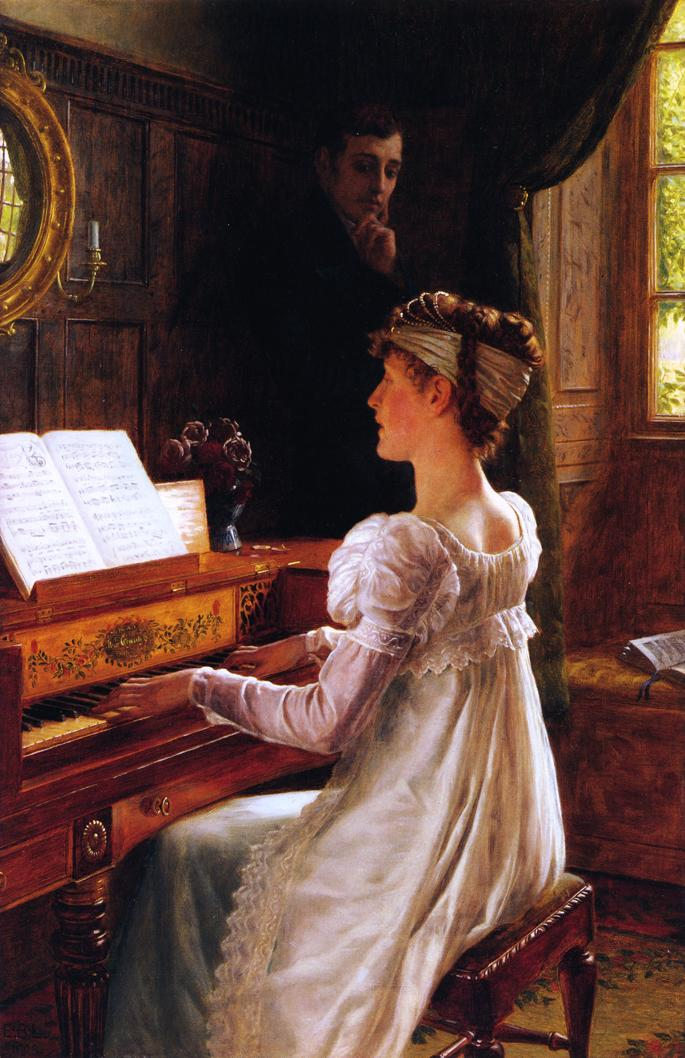
Courtship (1903)

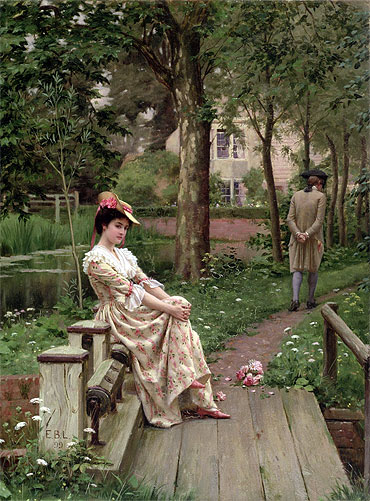
Off (1899)

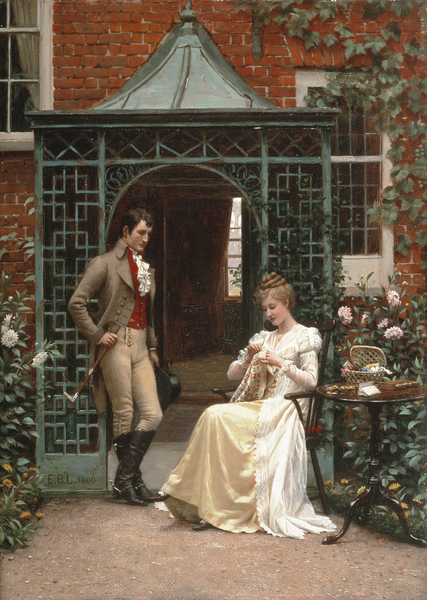
On the Threshold (1900)

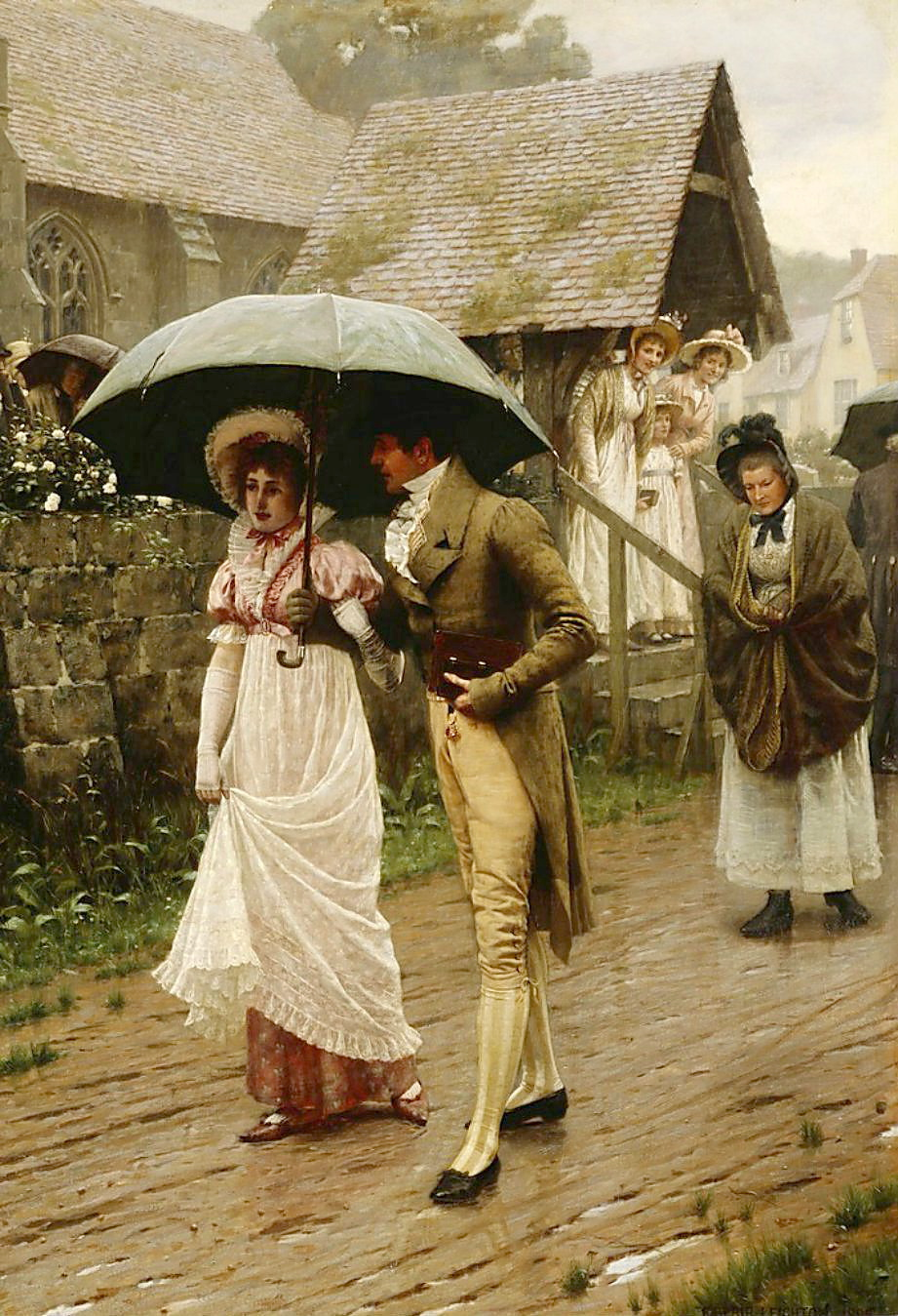
A Wet Sunday Morning (1896)

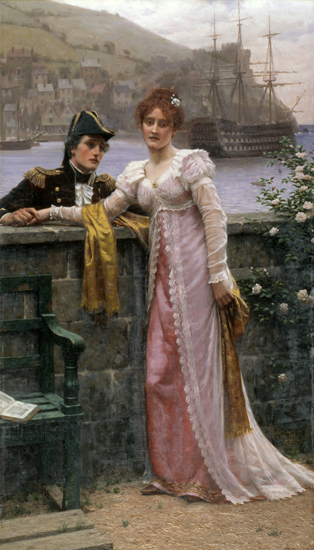
Adieu (1901)

Twentieth-century editions feature illustrations influenced by the style of their time. Between 1957 and 1975, Joan Hassall (1906-1988) produced a series of woodcuts for the Folio Society edition. When the film Pride and Prejudice, starring Laurence Olivier and Greer Garson, was released in 1940, Grosset & Dunlap, a publisher specializing in the reissue of novels illustrated with photographs from the film (Photoplay edition), put three inexpensive editions on sale, complete with photos from the film.

==== Front covers ====
The many English and American editions feature a wide variety of front covers and dust jackets: reproductions of paintings from the period for critical editions, such as those from Penguin Classics, Oxford World's Classics, Wordsworth Classics or Ignatius Critical Editions, a photo from the 1995 mini-series or the 2005 film poster, for paperback editions published in those years, original pen-and-ink drawings for Pocket Penguin Classics (the White Collection), more eye-catching or very neutrally elegant illustrations for budget editions, depending on the target audience.

French paperback editions are less varied: publishers don't always have an ongoing collection of Jane Austen's novels, especially when they present recent translations. Pride and Prejudice and Persuasion in Folio classique Folio classique, (Note: Since then, all of Jane Austen's novels have been published in Folio classique, either in the original translation or in the translations published in 2013 in La Pléiade.) like Pride and Prejudice in Classiques de Poche, feature a reproduction of a painting; the translation published in 2010 by GF features an original cut-out; and the abridged edition of Pride and Prejudice in Livre de Poche jeunesse features a symbolic photo. Christian Lacroix designed the covers for nine novels in the Livre de Poche catalog, including Emma. Editions Bon Marché, which offers the complete collection of Jane Austen's novels, reissues old translations that have fallen into the public domain. ArchiPoche presents a series of portraits of mid-19th-century women, while 10/18, whose previous editions did the same, has been reissuing Jane Austen's six novels with original covers since 2012.

==== Comics ====
Marvel, the American Comics publisher, has embarked on the transposition of Jane Austen's novels, starting with Pride and Prejudice, in five episodes, the first of which came out in April 2009 and the last in August of the same year, on a script by Nancy Hajeski, before publishing it in a single volume. In 2010, he continued with Sense and Sensibility, illustrated by Sonny Liew, and then Emma.

=== Websites ===
The oldest online platforms dedicated to Jane Austen are those of the Jane Austen Societies, particularly the North American branch, established in 1979. This society publishes a biannual journal, Persuasions (in print) and Persuasions On-Line, which features scholarly articles exploring Austen’s works and her world. Another notable site is “The Republic of Pemberley,” a virtual community created in the United States following the broadcast of the 1995 mini-series. Additionally, there are websites for the Jane Austen Museum in Bath and a smaller one for Chawton.

Numerous enthusiastic bloggers have also created pages devoted to Jane Austen, primarily in English but also in other languages, including French. These platforms often included forums and a wealth of fanfiction, some of which were written collaboratively in the form of round-robin stories.

In addition to the many videos uploaded to YouTube, excerpts linked to existing films and TV movies, an original web series in 100 two-to-eight-minute episodes was created there from April 9, 2012 to March 28, 2013. The Lizzie Bennet Diaries, a new avatar of Pride and Prejudice, transposes the plot to 21st-century California and presents itself as the personal video blog of a witty and penniless young student, Lizzie Bennet, who is studying for a Master's degree in mass communications and posts a new chapter of her diaries twice a week on her blog. The Guardian calls this careful and inventive transposition “the best of small-screen adaptations”, as “Elizabeth Bennet and Fitzwilliam Darcy celebrate the two-hundredth anniversary of their appearance in literature”.

== Bibliography ==
- Massei-Chamayou, Marie-Laure (2012). La Représentation de l'argent dans les romans de Jane Austen : L'être et l'avoir [The Representation of Money in Jane Austen's Novels: Being and Having] (in French). Paris: L'Harmattan. ISBN 978-2296993419.
- Trunel, Lucile (2010). Les éditions françaises de Jane Austen, 1815-2007 - L'apport de l'histoire éditoriale à la compréhension de la réception de l'auteur en France [French editions of Jane Austen, 1815-2007 - The contribution of publishing history to understanding the author's reception in France] (in French). H. Champion. ISBN 978-2745320803.
- Cartmell, Deborah (2010). Jane Austen's Pride and Prejudice: The Relationship between Text and Film. A&C Black. ISBN 978-1408105931.
- Jones, Hazel (2009). Jane Austen and marriage. Continuum International Publishing Group. ISBN 978-1847252180.
- Ballester, Isabelle (2009). Les nombreux mondes de Jane Austen [Jane Austen's numerous worlds] (in French). Les moutons électriques. ISBN 978-2915793802.
- Barcsay, Katherine Eva (2008). "Profit and Production: Jane Austen's Pride and Prejudice on film". University of British Columbia.
- Graham, Peter (2008). Jane Austen & Charles Darwin: Naturalists and Novelists. Ashgate Publishing. ISBN 9780754658511.
- Martin, Lydia (2007). Les adaptations à l'écran des romans de Jane Austen: esthétique et idéologie [Screen adaptations of Jane Austen's novels: aesthetics and ideology] (in French). L'Harmattan. ISBN 978-2-296-17996-7.
- Southam, B.C. (2006). Jane Austen's Literary Manuscripts. London: Continuum International Publishing Group. ISBN 9780826490704.
- Todd, Janet (2005). Jane Austen in Context (1st ed.). Cambridge University Press. ISBN 978-0521826440. LCCN 2005012924.
- Le Faye, Deirdre (2003). Jane Austen: The World of Her Novels. London: Frances Lincoln. ISBN 978-0711222786.
- Macdonald, Gina; Macdonald, Andrew (2003). Jane Austen on screen. Cambridge University Press. ISBN 978-0521797283.
- Parril, Sue (2002). Jane Austen on film and television: a critical study of the adaptations. McFarland. ISBN 9780786413492.
- Morris, Ivor (1999). Jane Austen and the Interplay of Character (2nd ed.). Continuum International Publishing Group. ISBN 978-0485121421.
- Nugent, Christopher; Brooke, Lawrence (1999). Jane Austen: illusion and reality. Boydell & Brewer. ISBN 978-0859915571.
- Tomalin, Claire (1997). Jane Austen: A Life. New York: Alfred A. Knopf. ISBN 0-679-44628-1.
- Copeland, Edward; McMaster, Juliet (1997). The Cambridge companion to Jane Austen. Cambridge University Press. ISBN 978-0521498678.
- Scheuermann, Mona (1993). Her bread to earn: women, money, and society from Defoe to Austen. University Press of Kentucky. ISBN 978-0813118178.
- MacDonagh, Oliver (1991). Jane Austen: Real and Imagined Worlds. New Haven: Yale University Press. ISBN 978-0300050844. LCCN 90026432.
- Southam, B.C. (1987). Jane Austen: The Critical Heritage. Vol. 2. Londres: Routledge and Paul Kegan. ISBN 0-710201893.
- Tanner, Tony (1986). Jane Austen. Harvard University Press. ISBN 978-0-674-47174-0.
- Goubert, Pierre (1975). Jane Austen : étude psychologique de la romancière [Jane Austen: a psychological study of the novelist] (in French). Publications de l'Université de Rouen. ISBN 978-2-87775-735-5.
- Giret, Gwen; Saim, Claire (2023). L'Encyclopédie visuelle-Jane Austen [The Visual Encyclopedia-Jane Austen] (in French). Hachette Heroes. ISBN 978-2-017-21463-2.
