= Georgian society in Jane Austen's novels =

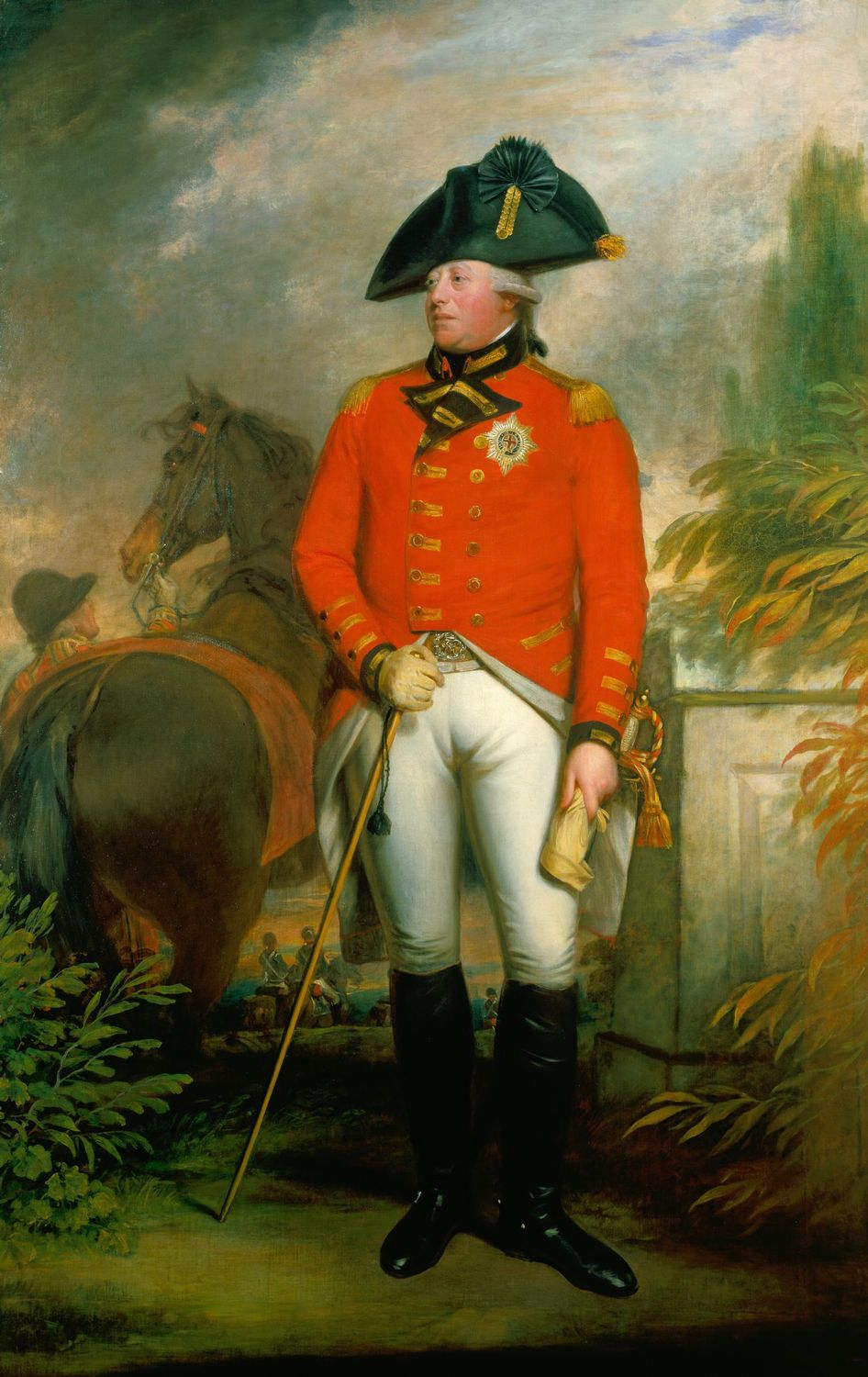
Portrait of George III (1738–1820), whose reign included all of Jane Austen's life. By Sir William Beechey

Georgian society in Jane Austen's novels is the ever-present background of her work, the world in which all her characters are set. Entirely situated during the reign of George III, the novels of Austen describe their characters' everyday lives, joys, sorrows, and loves, providing insight into the period.

Austen's novels deal with such varied subjects as the historical context, the social hierarchies of the time, the role and status of the clergy, gender roles, marriage, or the pastimes of well-off families. Without even the reader noticing, many details are broached, whether of daily life, of forgotten legal aspects, or of surprising customs, thus bringing life and authenticity to the English society of this period.

Nevertheless, the point of view from which Austen describes England is that of a woman of the English gentry (albeit from its lower fringes), belonging to a reasonably well-off family, well connected and remarkably well educated for the time, and living in a very small village of rural England around the late 1790s or early 19th century. Thus, some essential aspects of the Georgian era are virtually absent from her novels, such as the American Revolutionary War and the loss of the Thirteen Colonies, the French Revolution, the beginning of the Industrial Revolution and the birth of the British Empire. Indeed, rather than a depiction of the history of English society at large, Austen's novels provide an understanding of the way of life of the lowest level of the gentry in rural England at the turn of the 19th century.

== Georgian society ==
All of Jane Austen's novels are set against the background of daily life in English Georgian society at the turn of the 19th century. As the name indicates, the Georgian period covers the successive reigns of kings George I, George II, George III, and George IV. That of William IV is also sometimes included.

This was a period of considerable progress, and was the precursor to the Victorian era which followed. During Jane Austen's own life, Britain suffered first the loss of its American colonies, then anxiety about the French Revolution, after which it confronted and finally overcame the Napoleonic Empire, and finally laid the foundations of the British Empire.

From the social point of view, a new social order emerged at this time with the beginnings of industrialisation. This was followed in the early years of the 19th century by serious social unrest (such as the revolt of the Luddites) caused by the economic changes it gave rise to and the anxieties that accompanied it.

The Arts also flourished at this time, with tremendous output in all fields. In architecture Robert Adam, John Nash and James Wyatt were active, and the neo-gothic style emerged. In painting Thomas Gainsborough and Sir Joshua Reynolds were the great names, and new painters such as J. M. W. Turner and John Constable were gaining recognition.

In literature too there were a host of famous writers such as Samuel Johnson and Samuel Richardson, and poets such as Samuel Coleridge, William Wordsworth, Percy Bysshe Shelley, John Keats and Lord Byron. It was a time of progress in education for women, leading to the proliferation of novels written and read by women, women writers who included Jane Austen herself, and also predecessors such as Fanny Burney, Ann Radcliffe and Maria Edgeworth.

Finally, the Georgian period was a time of moral questioning and debate. The beginnings of feminism appeared at this time with Mary Wollstonecraft and her groundbreaking work A Vindication of the Rights of Woman. Growing concern about slavery was another major development, which soon led to the abolition of the slave trade (1807), and ultimately to the abolition of slavery in the British Empire in 1833.

== Perspective ==
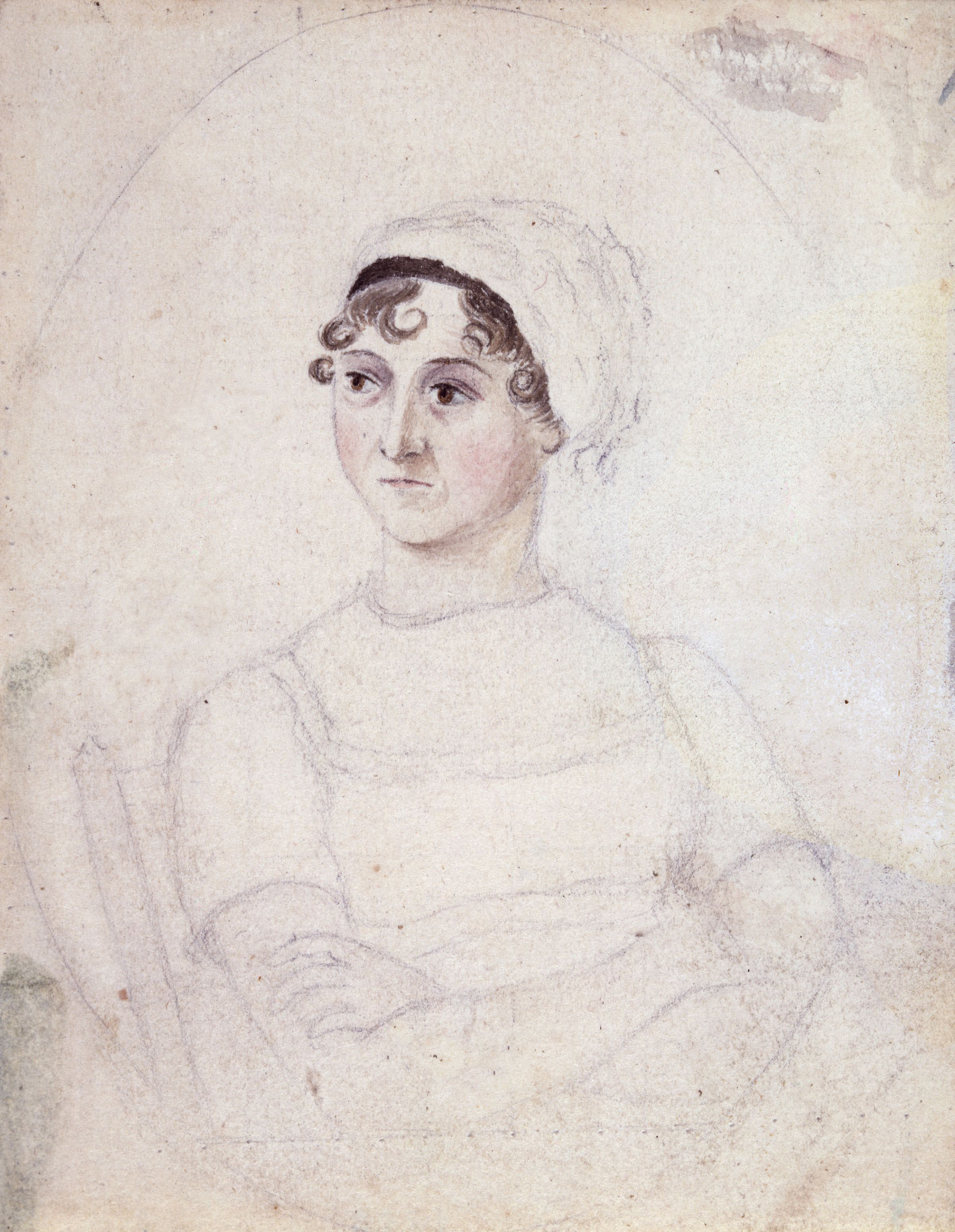
Jane Austen, in a drawing by her sister Cassandra.

Jane Austen's purpose never was to write historical or social novels, nor to provide a balanced and objective picture of late 18th century England. Her stories—considered as "comic", because of their happy endings— all take place in the society she knew, that of a small rural gentry family, rather well-off though without fortune, around the 19th century. As she wrote in one of her letters to niece Anna Austen: "three or four families in a Country Village [is] the little bit (two Inches wide) of Ivory on which I work".

Consequently, some aspects of Georgian society, despite their importance, are ignored, or, at most, hinted at, in Austen's novels: thus, the loss of the Thirteen Colonies, as the Declaration of Independence took place when she was barely one year old, as well as the war with the former colonies itself and the ensuing Treaty of Paris in 1783, when she was eight, do not have any part in her novels.

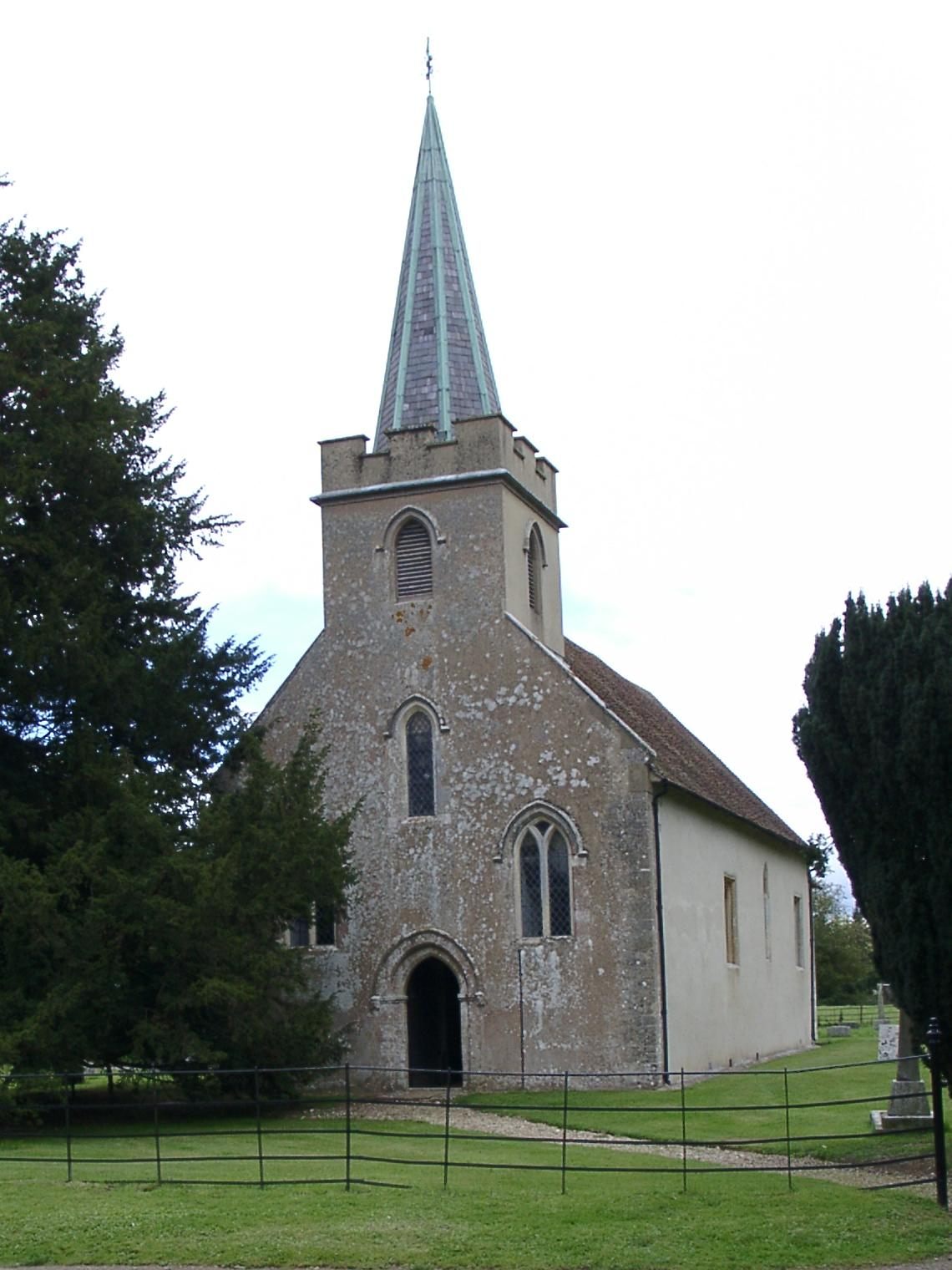
The 12th century Steventon church, which was that of George Austen, Jane Austen's father.

Similarly, the French Revolution does not find its way into her work, except as regards her cousin Eliza Hancock, comtesse de Feuillide and her French husband, Jean-François Capot de Feuillide, who was guillotined in 1794.

Even the birth of the British Empire is largely absent from her world. However, the owners of Mansfield Park have a plantation in the Caribbean, and the Austens had a connection with India, since that is where Eliza and her mother, Philadelphia Austen Hancock, had arrived from around 1786. Indeed, the Austens were warm supporters of Warren Hastings, Philadelphia's long time friend (and possibly Eliza's father), (Note: Warren Hastings was one of the first admirers of Pride and Prejudice (see David Cecil, 2009, p. 35).) when he was sued for serious misdemeanour in India before being cleared in April 1795.

Though the Industrial Revolution had started in England as early as the 1750s, it is not apparent in the way she lived as well as in her novels. (Note: In her last novel, Sanditon, however, which remained unfinished because of her death, there appear some definitely modern aspects, in connection with the speculation in this fast developing seaside resort) Life in the small rural village of Steventon, Hampshire, where the family rectory was, kept her quite far from this new world. Besides, she belonged to the local gentry, in a reasonably well-off family whose head was the village parson, nurtured by the reading of Samuel Johnson's works; as such, a Tory at heart, she lived in unison with her position in society.

But her point of view was that of a woman of her times: clever and perceptive, very well read, she lived however in a society organised by men for men; this meant for a woman considerable difficulties to become financially independent through her own trade, and the fact that social status as well as economic security had to be expected from marriage; these themes are consequently ubiquitous in her novels.

== Historical context ==
=== George III ===
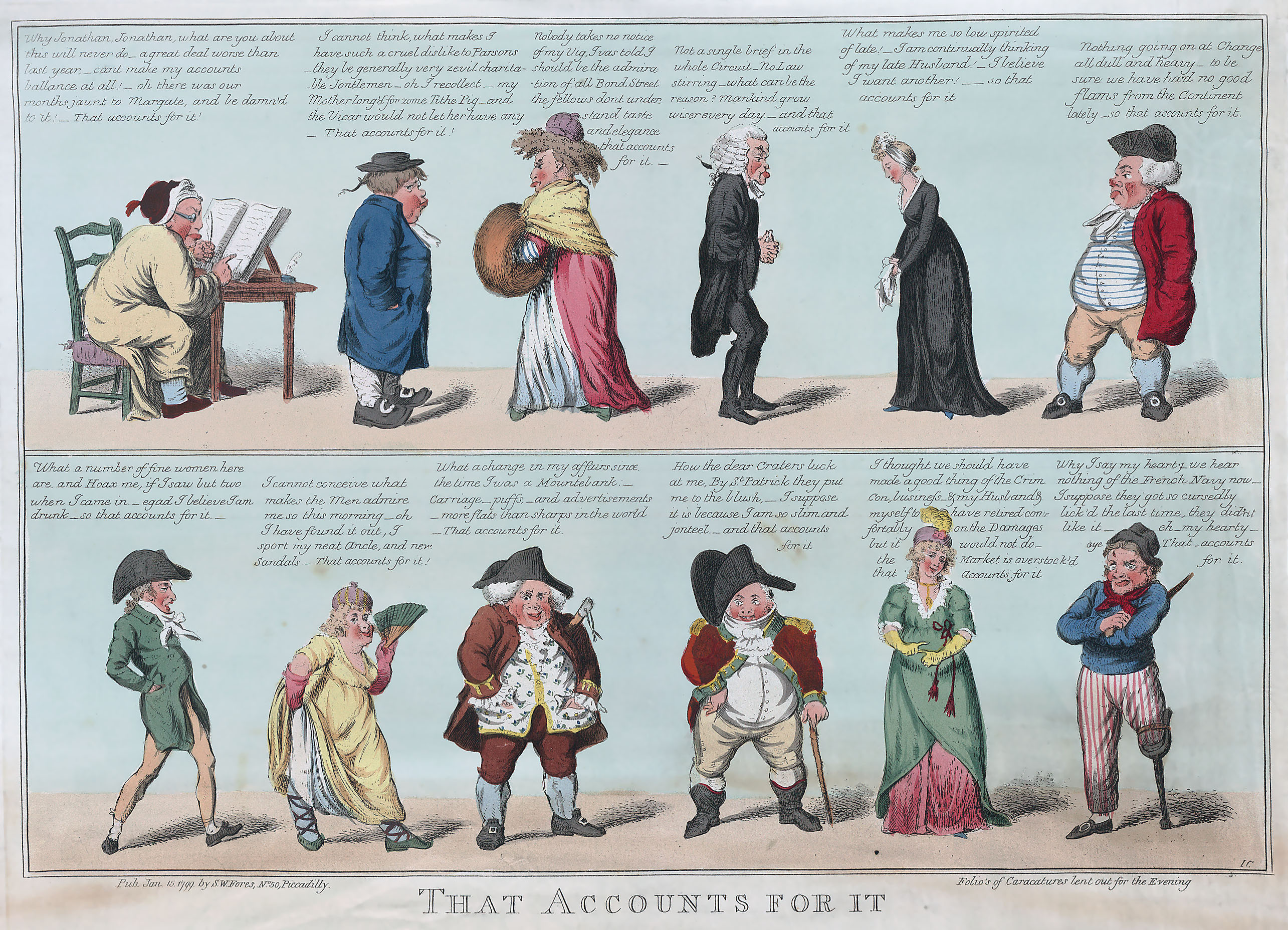
Various Georgian era types, during the reign of George III. By Isaac Cruikshank (1799).

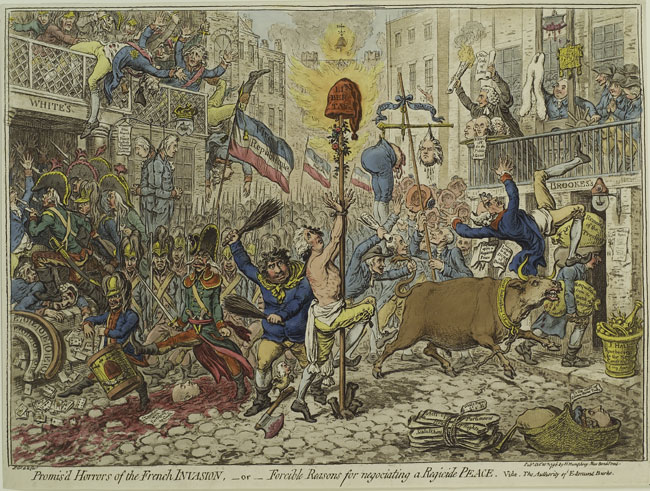
Promis'd Horrors of the French Invasion: the French Revolution unleashed all kinds of fantasies in the British imagination (caricature by James Gillray, in 1796).

The reign of George III – if one includes in it the Regency period that took place during his final illness – encompasses all of Jane Austen's life, and even beyond, as it started in 1760, just before her parents married in 1764, and ended in 1820, after the death of Austen in 1817 and the posthumous publication of her two novels, Persuasion and Northanger Abbey in 1818.

=== French Revolution ===
It is through her cousin Eliza de Feuillide, married to a French aristocrat, that Jane Austen first heard of the French Revolution and of its violence. Eliza stayed in England in 1786 and 1787, and made several trips between France and England from 1788 to 1792. In January 1791, Eliza was in Margate, and was hoping that her husband, who had just joined a royalist group in Turin, could come back to her in June. After a brief stay in England during the winter of 1791, he then returned to France, as he wanted to come to the assistance of a friend, the Marquise de Marbeuf, accused of conspiring against the Republic. Unfortunately, he was unmasked while trying to suborn a witness, and duly arrested and guillotined.

The memory of Eliza de Feuillide can be seen in several of Austen's Juvenilia, such as Love and Freindship (sic)—dedicated, as it was, to "Madame la Comtesse de Feuillide"—or Henry and Eliza.

At the same time, the French Revolution led in England to the Revolution Controversy, involving such thinkers as Mary Wollstonecraft and her groundbreaking book A Vindication of the Rights of Woman, William Godwin, Thomas Paine and Joseph Priestley. Austen, as the staunch Tory supporter she had always been, was herself in favour of the family as bringing stability in the midst of the turmoils of the times.

=== Napoleonic Wars ===
The Napoleonic Wars are the series of wars that took place in Europe while Napoleon was France's head of state. They are the continuation of the wars that arose as a result of the French Revolution in 1789, saw France briefly dominate most of Europe, and continued until the final defeat of Napoleon in 1815. These were wars on a formerly unprecedented scale, largely as a result of mass conscription, and Britain remained at war with France throughout the period of 1803 to 1815, only two years before Austen died. Two of Jane Austen's brothers, Frank and Charles, made their careers in the Royal Navy.

This period of warfare accounts for the importance of the military in the novels, where some of the protagonists are officers, and the presence of officers at social functions is frequently a factor in the social life of a neighbourhood. Hence in Sense and Sensibility Marianne's suitor is Colonel Brandon, the dastardly Wickham in Pride and Prejudice is an officer in the militia, and the youngest Bennet girls are obsessed with the officers at the nearby training camp in Meryton. In Mansfield Park, Fanny Price's brother is a midshipman in the Royal Navy, and in Northanger Abbey, Frederick Tilney is an army officer and his father a retired general. Persuasion's Frederick Wentworth is a naval officer whose career takes him from poverty to success and wealth.

== Social and economic ranks ==
=== Income spread ===
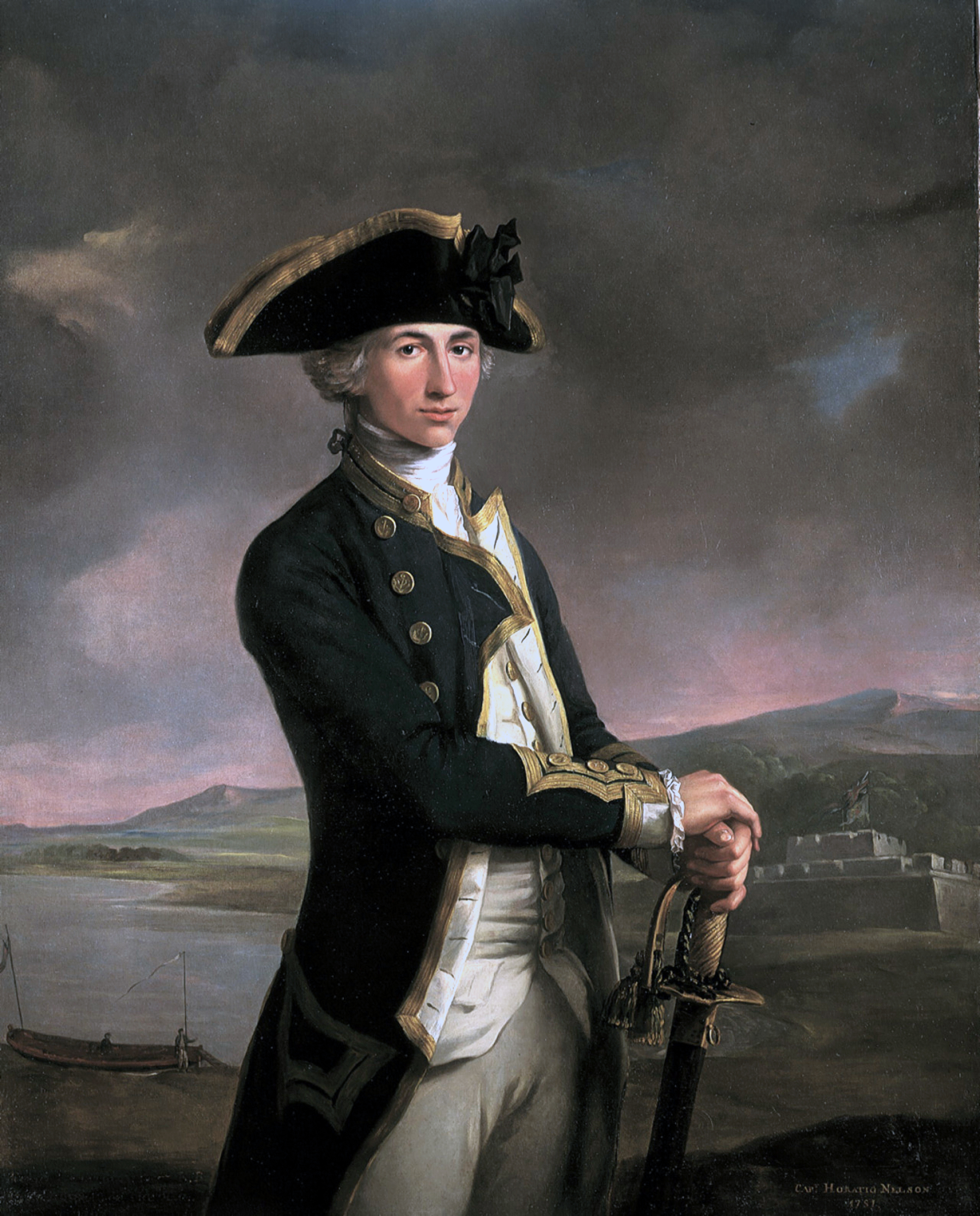
A young and promising captain of the Royal Navy in 1781, Horatio Nelson. By John Francis Rigaud.

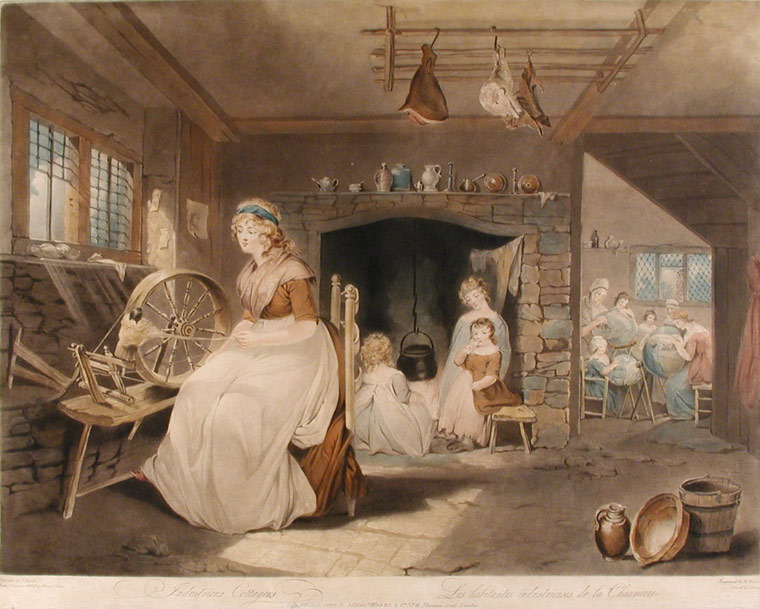
Industrious Cottagers in 1801. By William Ward, after James Ward.

The income spread seen in Jane Austen's novels allows us to better determine the social status of her different characters. Except in the case of heiresses, where we talk about the total fortune, these revenues are always annual.

In any case, it is easy to calculate the income corresponding to a given fortune, since money invested in government funds pays 5% a year (or only 4% in the case of a small investment). Thus Caroline Bingley's fortune of 20,000 pounds (Pride and Prejudice) guarantees her an income of 1000 pounds a year, already a large sum which guarantees her a competence, that is, everything that can be considered necessary to lead a pleasant life, including a carriage.

Jane Austen's novels depict a whole income hierarchy which implies very different lifestyles.

One hundred pounds a year: in Jane Austen's novels, this is a very low income, that of a poor curate, for example, or of a civil servant working in a government office, or again of a small shopkeeper. However, it is rather satisfactory compared with that of a farm labourer which can be as little as twenty-five pounds a year (Note: Twenty-five pounds a year is also the yearly income about which Mary Wollstonecraft wrote to her sister for a governess's position, which would provide food and shelter, though nothing beyond. See also Janet M. Todd, 2005, p. 320.) including extra work at harvest time. With 100 pounds a year, the best one can expect is to have a maid of all work, as Mrs Jennings points out to Edward Ferrars and Lucy Steele (Sense and Sensibility) when they seem to be about to get married with only this level of income.

Two hundred pounds: this is the income of Jane Austen's parents four years after their marriage in 1764; even though it is double what they had at the beginning of their married life, it is barely adequate due to the birth of their children. Three hundred pounds would better meet their needs, even though that is the income of which Colonel Brandon says to Edward Ferrars that it is a nice sum for a single man, but "insufficient to permit him to marry".

Four, or better, five hundred pounds: this is the level above which one can lead the life befitting a member of the gentry. It is the income enjoyed by Mrs Dashwood, which permits her to give her daughters a decent existence, with two maids and a serving man, but neither carriage nor horses.

Seven hundred to a thousand pounds a year make a carriage possible: when George Austen, Jane's father, reaches an income of 700 pounds he buys himself one, even though he realises that it is a pleasure that is slightly too expensive.

Two thousand pounds a year might seem a very comfortable sum, even for a gentleman. It is, for example, Colonel Brandon's income in Sense and Sensibility. But it is also the income of Mr Bennet, who, with a wife and five daughters, has difficulty living well on this sum. It is, however, true that his abilities in household management are very poor.

Four thousand pounds and above are the level above which even a gentleman ceases to need to do too much counting. It is the income enjoyed by Henry Crawford, Mr Rushworth (Mansfield Park), Bingley, and Mr Darcy (Pride and Prejudice) who actually has 10,000 pounds a year. At this level of income, one has a manor house or even a country estate, a carriage and everything that goes with it, and also no doubt a house in London to be able to make a comfortable stay in the capital.

But these incomes, large as they are, are exceeded by the real-life 100,000 pounds a year at the disposal of the owner of Chatsworth House, the Duke of Devonshire. (Note: To these 100,000 pounds per annum—corresponding to the income from his Devonshire estate—must be added profits from his mining interests in Derbyshire, as well as rents from property in London. See Deirdre Le Faye, 2003, p. 129.)

The fact remains, however, that Jane Austen's universe is a privileged world which conceals the harshness of the living conditions of the vast majority of the rural population, a population which is impoverished, uneducated and brutal. Thus common amusements include the omnipresent dog fighting and cockfighting. In the spirit of the times, this brutality is considered by many politicians as being necessary to get the British people accustomed to the sight of blood, and to forge "the true British bulldog character".

== Gentry ==
Jane Austen's novels are set in the social context of the gentry, to which Jane Austen herself belonged. Some of her heroines have no fortune (Pride and Prejudice, Mansfield Park), others on the other hand are very well off (Emma), but the social class remains the same.

=== The gentleman ===
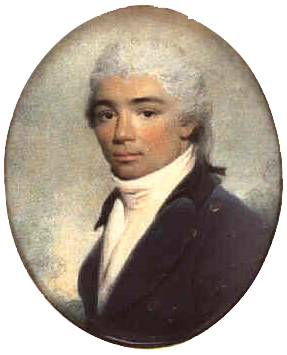
A gentleman in a blue coat, with powdered hair, (Note: Powdering one's hair appears in The Watsons; it fell out of fashion around 1805 (Margaret Drabble, "Social Background", Jane Austen, 2003, p. 35, Lady Susan, The Watsons and Sanditon).) and wearing a Wellington tie (around 1800).

The concept of gentleman in England is more flexible than that of nobleman in France. A gentleman is distinguished by his personal qualities as much as by his status as a member of the landed gentry. He does not need to be of noble lineage, like his French counterpart the gentilhomme, or to have a noble name. As the successor to the franklin, the free landed proprietor, who occupied the lowest rank of the nobility in the Middle Ages, the simple gentleman therefore comes after the Esquire (title derived from Squire, the chief landed proprietor in a district), who in turn is inferior, in ascending order of precedence, to the Knight, the Baronet, the Baron, the Viscount, the Earl, the Marquess, and finally to the Duke. Only the titles of Baron or higher belong to the peerage, to which simple knights or baronets do not therefore belong.

It is the gentleman of the Georgian period who is the precursor to the gentleman of the Victorian period in that he establishes a code of conduct based on the three Rs: Restraint, Refinement and Religion. During the reign of George III, the British begin, by their reserve and emotional control, to distinguish themselves from the peoples of southern Europe who are of a more hot-headed temperament. The literature of the 19th century does nevertheless privilege emotion, often to the point of pathos, as in Dickens.

== Country houses and parks, and their owners ==
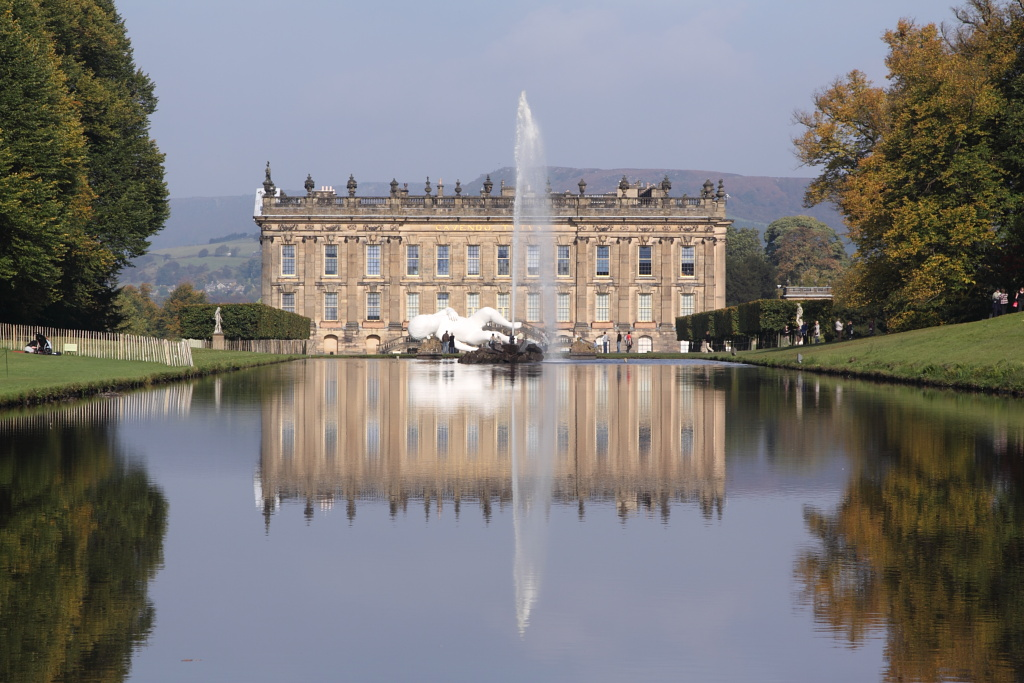
Chatsworth House, (Note: Indeed, Chatsworth House appears as Pemberley in the 2005 film Pride and Prejudice, directed by Joe Wright, and starring Keira Knightley. Jane Austen had very probably visited Chatsworth in 1811, when revising Pride and Prejudice, during a stay in Derbyshire in an inn a few miles from Chatsworth House ( The selected essays of Donald Greene, p. 303). However, as there is no direct reference to Chatsworth House in the novel, whereas there is a specific description of Pemberley, it may be assumed that Pemberley is partly an imagined place, as are Longbourn or Meryton.) often believed to be Pemberley House, and seat of the Dukes of Devonshire.

The differences in income and fortune reflected in Jane Austen's novels are considerable. In real Georgian society, the Duke of Devonshire maintains a household of 180 people in his country house, Chatsworth House. Just to feed that number of people, five cattle and fifteen sheep are slaughtered each week. In return for this wealth, it is customary for the proprietor to use his huge kitchens to have thick soups prepared and distributed to the most needy villagers during the winter, when bad weather sets in and fuel becomes scarce.

In Great Britain, the 18th century is a period of considerable wealth generation; the nobility therefore live in sumptuous country houses, among them Blenheim, Knole House, Castle Howard, and of course Chatsworth, all of which are comparable with the royal family's most beautiful homes. The style of the great houses and manors constructed at the beginning of the century is almost always Palladian, with the great architect William Kent. This strict Palladian style becomes freer with Robert Adam. It is possible to imagine that Rosings Park, Lady Catherine de Bourgh's house, and Mansfield Park, both of which Jane Austen describes as modern, belong to the style of houses constructed by Robert Adam.

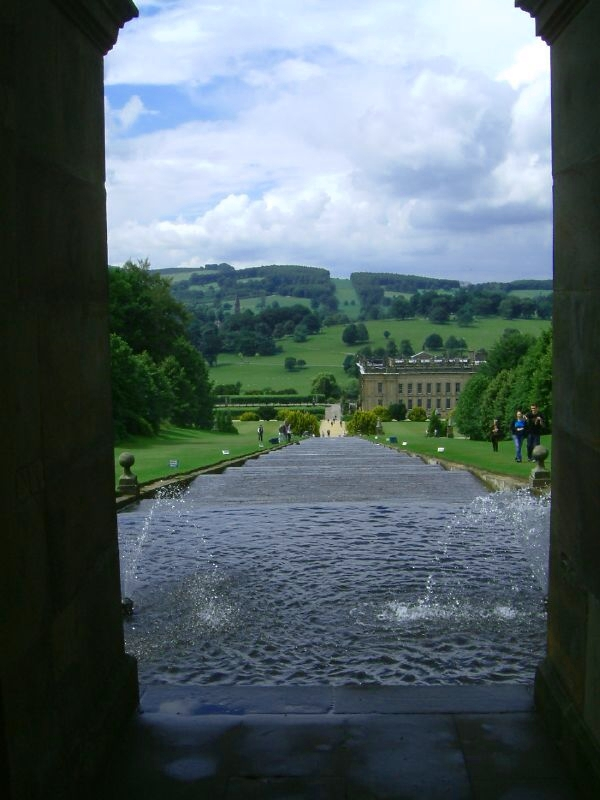
View of Chatsworth House from the top of the Cascade. The park of Chatsworth House had been redesigned by Capability Brown.

During the same period, rich owners devote a lot of time and money to beautifying the grounds surrounding their house, and to making the approaches and the views from the windows more impressive. The famous English landscape artist "Capability" Brown is in fact active during the Georgian period; his nickname is based on his favourite declaration that certain grounds offered "a great capability of improvement". The beauty of English estates at this time also becomes a symbol of national identity when in 1780 Horace Walpole contrasts their natural style, an expression of freedom, with the geometrical layout of French gardens, which according to him bears witness to the authoritarianism of France's political régime.

We find this preoccupation with landscaping aesthetics reflected in Mansfield Park, during the long discussion where Mr Rushworth speaks of his ambition to improve the grounds of his Sotherton house and the views it offers.

Following Capability Brown but going even further, Humphry Repton softens the transition between the houses themselves and their surroundings, where Brown had extended lawns to the house. This too is in reaction against French-style gardens. It is Repton who at Adlestrop in Gloucestershire, where Jane Austen's cousins the Leighs live, remodels the vast grounds of Adlestrop House to combine them with the garden of the adjoining vicarage, and diverts a watercourse to compose a landscape which can be admired equally well from the manor house and from the vicarage.

The memory of the beauty of English parks is a constant in Jane Austen's novels, and she associates it with the poems of William Cowper, the poet of the English countryside. And in perfect keeping with the aesthetic principles promoted by Thomas Whately in his Observations on Modern Gardening in 1770, the description of the grounds of the houses she depicts is as important as that of the house itself, for the beauty of the place consists of the harmonious and natural union of the two:

[Pemberley] was a large, handsome, stone building, standing well on rising ground, and backed by a ridge of high woody hills – and in front, a stream of some natural importance, was swelled into greater, but without any artificial appearance. Its banks were neither formal, nor falsely adorned. Elizabeth was delighted. She had never seen a place for which nature had done more, or where natural beauty had been so little counteracted by an awkward taste.

— Jane Austen, Pride and Prejudice

== Clergy ==
=== The clergy in Jane Austen's novels ===
The clergy occupy an essential place in Jane Austen's work, even more than the Royal Navy, because Jane Austen's father himself was a clergyman, as were her brother James, and briefly her brother Henry. The moral principles taught by her father are found in the moral precepts sprinkled throughout the novels.

The position of clergyman at the time was a special one from several points of view. Firstly, being a clergyman was a profession like any other. Any well-educated, well-spoken man of sound morals could enter it, and no particular religious vocation was called for. And as Mary Crawford points out in Mansfield Park, the living attached to the post of vicar guaranteed a good income for work that was not onerous. Moreover, thanks to the living, a clergyman was in a position to start a family earlier than a naval officer, who might have to wait for years before raising enough money to do so.

Nor do clergymen in the novels benefit from any special consideration on the part of the author. On the contrary, they are frequently depicted in a very unflattering light, although there are others who are shown as more sympathetic and admirable characters.

Mr Elton, in Emma, demonstrates an excessive social ambition in proposing to the eponymous Emma Woodhouse, and once he is married later in the novel, he and his wife Augusta patronise the villagers and disgust Emma with their pretentiousness.

In Pride and Prejudice, Mr Collins is an example of what a clergyman ought not to be. He is obsequious towards the powerful, arrogant towards the weak, sententious and narrow-minded. In spite of his faults, however, he seems to be more involved in his job than an Edward Ferrars or a Henry Tilney.

Henry Tilney, in fact, in Northanger Abbey, is absent from his parish half the time and takes holidays in Bath, so that in spite of his intellectual and moral qualities, he bears witness to the lack of commitment of certain clergymen towards their flock.

As for Edward Ferrars in Sense and Sensibility, he does give evidence of a more definite vocation when he insists that he has "always preferred the Church" as his profession, even though his family consider a career in the army or the Royal Navy "more appropriate", or the law more worthy of a gentleman.

Edmund Bertram alone, in Mansfield Park, shows an unshakeable vocation that all Mary Crawford's charm and seductiveness never succeed in weakening. Try as she may, incessantly praising the superior merits and prestige of a military career, the solidity of his principles and his deep conviction prevent him from doubting.

=== The Select Vestry ===
The business of the parish – essentially everything other than public worship – was conducted by meetings of the select vestry; Membership of the select vestry was commonly by co-option of the current membership, and would be expected to include the leading magistrates and all those regarded as notable gentry within the parish, together with the beneficed incumbent, if resident. In 'Emma', the select vestry of Highbury meets in the Crown on a Saturday, and Mr Knightly is clearly the leading figure in their discussions, with Mr Elton apparently in the chair and Mr Cox, Mr Weston and Mr Cole also attending. Around a fifth of all public expenditure in England at this period was disposed through meetings of select vestries including the financing of the Overseers of the Poor, the House of Correction, the Beadle, the Poorhouse, the registration of births, marriages and deaths, the collection of rates, the parish school and the upkeep of roads and bridges in the parish. Local men identified to serve in the Militia would be nominated by them.

In principle, the responsibility for these functions lay with the 'open vestry', the annual meeting of ratepayers around Easter at which churchwardens were chosen, but in practice select vestries had taken over for all other business. Effectively, its meetings governed the local area.

=== Revenues of the clergyman ===
The income of a clergyman varied a great deal depending on the living assigned to him. A small, poor, rural parish like Steventon might be worth only about £100 a year, while a good parish could be worth nearly £1000. The allocation of the living, and therefore of the benefits attached to it, was often in the hands of the local lord of the manor, though a number were held by the diocesan bishop and even some university colleges. (This right was called the right of advowson and could be bought and sold or donated like property.) The two components of the living were the tithe and the glebe of which the incumbent was the beneficiary.

The tithe

The tithe in theory guaranteed the clergyman one tenth of the product of all the cultivated land in the parish; it constituted a sort of tax which had existed in England since the 9th century, with the clergyman himself as the tax-collector. Legally, however, the beneficiary of the tithe was not the clergyman (who might find that only part was allocated to him), but the rector. Thus when Colonel Brandon in Sense and Sensibility informs Edward Ferrars that "Delaford is a rectory", he is also informing him that if he were awarded the parish, he would receive the whole of the corresponding tithe. Jane Austen's father was himself rector of Steventon. Once collected, the revenue had to be managed, since in a poor rural economy the tithe was often paid in kind. This led to a clergyman's needing to have the use of a tithe barn in which to store what he had collected. He also had to negotiate with his parishioners to get all that he was owed. The parishioners did not always react well to his role as tax collector, which took up a large part of a clergyman's time, so much so that Mr Collins, at the Bingleys' ball (Pride and Prejudice), lists it as the first of his duties, ahead even of writing sermons, which comes in second place. The patron of the living also of course had an interest in increasing the revenue raised by the incumbent since this raised the value of the charge he could sell or bestow. The curate or rector's protector is a major personage in the region, as for example are Lady Catherine de Bourgh, Mr Collins' patron in Pride and Prejudice and Colonel Brandon in Sense and Sensibility. Moreover, this patron may want to reserve a living for a younger son, as does Sir Thomas Bertram with respect to Edmund in Mansfield Park, or General Tilney in favour of Henry in Northanger Abbey.

The glebe

The glebe was a parcel of land donated to the church, often in the distant past, whose produce was designated for the incumbent of the corresponding parish. This necessarily made the clergyman into a farmer, a job which therefore took up a large part of his time. Thus Parson Trulliber, in Henry Fielding's 1742 novel Joseph Andrews, spends six days out of seven on his farming activities, and Parson Adams, when he visits him at home, finds him "with an apron on and a pail in his hand, just come from serving his hogs". Even when it didn't go that far, this necessary farm work further reduced the time actually spent on religious tasks as such.

== Women's occupations ==
=== Education ===
In Jane Austen's time, girls' boarding schools already existed, even if for the aristocracy a governess was the normal choice for the education of the girls in the family.

Thus in Emma, young Harriet Smith, whose origins are very modest, is placed in Mrs Goddard's boarding school to receive a minimal education. On the other hand, Emma Woodhouse, daughter of a good family with a fine fortune, has her own governess, Miss Taylor. And Lady Catherine de Bourgh (Pride and Prejudice) is scandalised to learn that the five Bennet girls, who belong to the minor gentry, have not benefited from the services of a governess.

Jane Austen herself, whose family was no better off than the Bennets, got her education essentially through contact with her father and brothers, and through making good use of her father's well-stocked library.

=== Women's employment ===
Slow progress in the education of girls needs to be seen in relation to the absence of suitable employment for women from good families, except, in fact, for a job as a governess or schoolmistress. The very idea that a woman might have a profession, with the attendant status and financial independence, was virtually inconceivable. As Mary Wollstonecraft wrote in 1792 in her famous A Vindication of the Rights of Woman: "How many women thus waste away the prey of discontent, who might have practiced as physicians, regulated a farm, managed a shop, and stood erect, supported by their own industry, instead of hanging their heads?"

This state of affairs was well-known to Jane Austen, since being unmarried herself, she was seeking through the sale of her novels to contribute to earning her own living by her work. Her writing reflects her situation, even though she did not rebel against it directly, in that she almost never depicts women involved in anything other than domestic activities, except for those who teach either as a governess or at a boarding school. The situation of Jane Fairfax in Emma is an illustration of this: of very humble origin, but intelligent, cultured, close to the ideal of the accomplished woman (she sings and plays the piano perfectly), her only prospect for the future is a post as governess in the home of people much inferior to her in terms of talent.

=== Legal rights ===
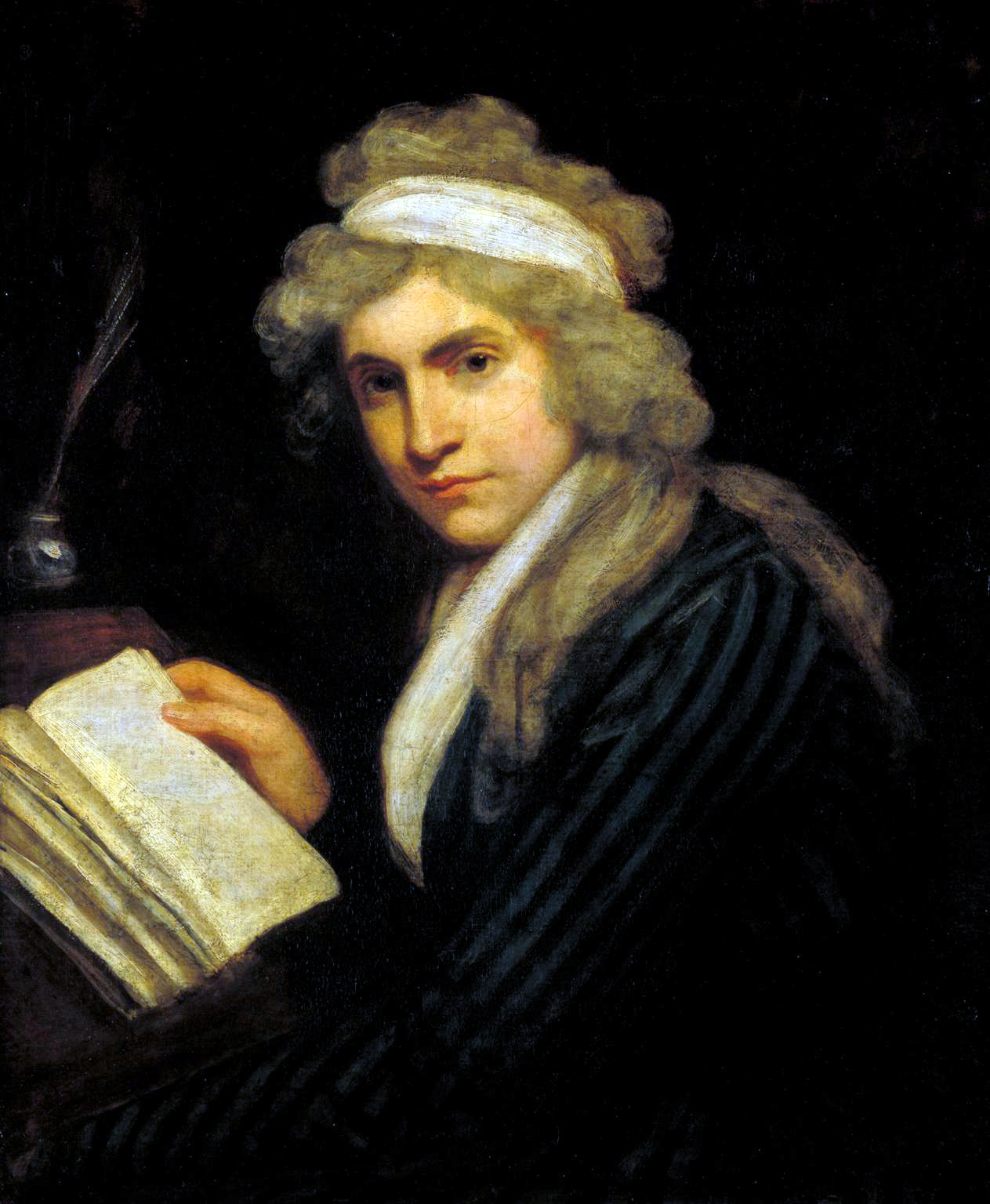
A portrait of Mary Wollstonecraft, author of A Vindication of the Rights of Woman. By John Opie, Tate Gallery.

The situation of women appearing in Jane Austen's novels shows at times their inferior status, on a legal as well as a financial level.

Thus, according to William Blackstone, in his Commentaries on the Laws of England (Oxford, 1765), man and woman become, by marriage, one and the same person: as long as the marriage lasts, the woman's legal existence is viewed as "suspended", and all her actions are done "under her husband's cover" (becoming herself a feme-covert). The rights and duties of the spouses derived from this principle. Thus, a man could not donate any piece of property, nor enter into any agreement with her, as her separate legal existence would be required for such deeds. On the other hand, he could bequeath property to his wife by will, since his wife's "coverture" would cease with his death. A woman who had been wronged—either herself or through her property—could not sue whoever had wronged her without the agreement and legal involvement of her husband. Conversely, no one could sue a married woman except through prosecuting her husband.

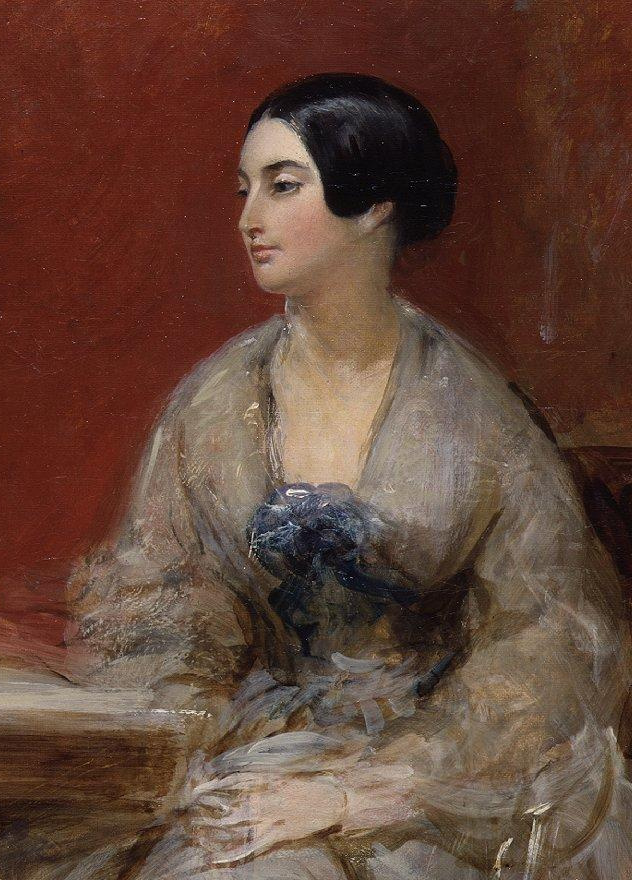
A portrait of Caroline Norton, who became a feminist writer after her dramatic experience of the English laws of the times.

This lack of any legal existence for married women was at the heart of the long and sensational divorce case that opposed, starting in the 1830s, Caroline Norton and her brutal, drunkard husband. Indeed, after years of conjugal misery, she finally left her husband, who retained total custody of her children; on top of which she came to realise that all her earnings as an author belonged to him (since he legally represented her), while at the same time he did not pay her the allowance he had agreed to. In spite of this much-publicized case, it was only in 1882 that, through the Married Women's Property Act, the legal rights of married women became equal to those of unmarried women (called 'feme sole') in that they gained the right to retain full control of their own property.

=== Role ===
==== The accomplished woman ====
An accomplished woman, who draws the admiration of men by her accomplishments, has to master so many things that, as Elizabeth Bennet says to Mr Darcy, "'I am no longer surprised at your knowing only six accomplished women. I rather wonder now at your knowing any.'"

==== Accomplishments ====
The list of accomplishments is indeed long, as can be seen in Pride and Prejudice, in the discussion Mr Darcy, Mr Bingley, Miss Bingley and Elizabeth Bennet have on the subject. If Mr Bingley's requirements are initially limited ("'paint tables, cover screens, and net purses'"), Mr Darcy and Miss Bingley are agreed in demanding some much more serious talents, such as a "'thorough knowledge of music, singing, drawing, dancing, and the modern languages'", as well as "'a certain something in her air and manner of walking, the tone of her voice, her address and expressions'". To these, Mr Darcy adds "'the improvement of her mind by extensive reading.'"

==== Purpose ====
Jane Austen's novels offer several answers to the question of the purpose of these accomplishments. If some of them, embroidery for example, are useful from a domestic point of view, others have hardly any practical use at all. This is the case for a knowledge of the French language, an essential accomplishment at the time, even though England and France are at war. The goal therefore appears to be to honour her (future) husband by acquiring knowledge, a deportment and manners worthy of a lady. But another aspect often appears: it is on women that the pleasures of social life depend. At a time when the opportunities to hear music are rare and expensive, a musical woman can charm guests with a few piano pieces, sing as Emma Woodhouse and Jane Fairfax do at the party at the Coles' (Emma), or provide the necessary accompaniment for an impromptu dance. In the same way, in the absence of photography, the possibility of recording a beloved face depends on women's talents in drawing or watercolour painting. This can be seen when Emma makes a portrait of Harriet Smith at the request of Mr Elton, and in the fact that the only known portrait of Jane Austen herself is one drawn by her sister Cassandra.

==== Other roles ====
An essential role of women in the Georgian period is to have children. This is a major role, reflected in the growth of England's population at this time, a role with which Jane Austen is well acquainted since she herself has no fewer than thirteen nieces and eleven nephews. It is also a difficult role, and dangerous at this time, since three of her sisters-in-law die in childbirth. This aspect however finds little place in Jane Austen's novels. Other than Pride and Prejudice, in which Mrs Bennet struggles to marry off her five daughters, the families portrayed in her novels have few children compared with the reality at the time. A second exception to this is Northanger Abbey, where the heroine, Catherine Morland, is one of ten children. It is true that Jane Austen's great novels are all situated before marriage, and that is what is really at stake. Married women and young girls are also very active in corresponding with those close to them, and this constitutes almost the only source of information on members of the family living in other parts of the country.

== Daily life ==
=== Women's fashions ===
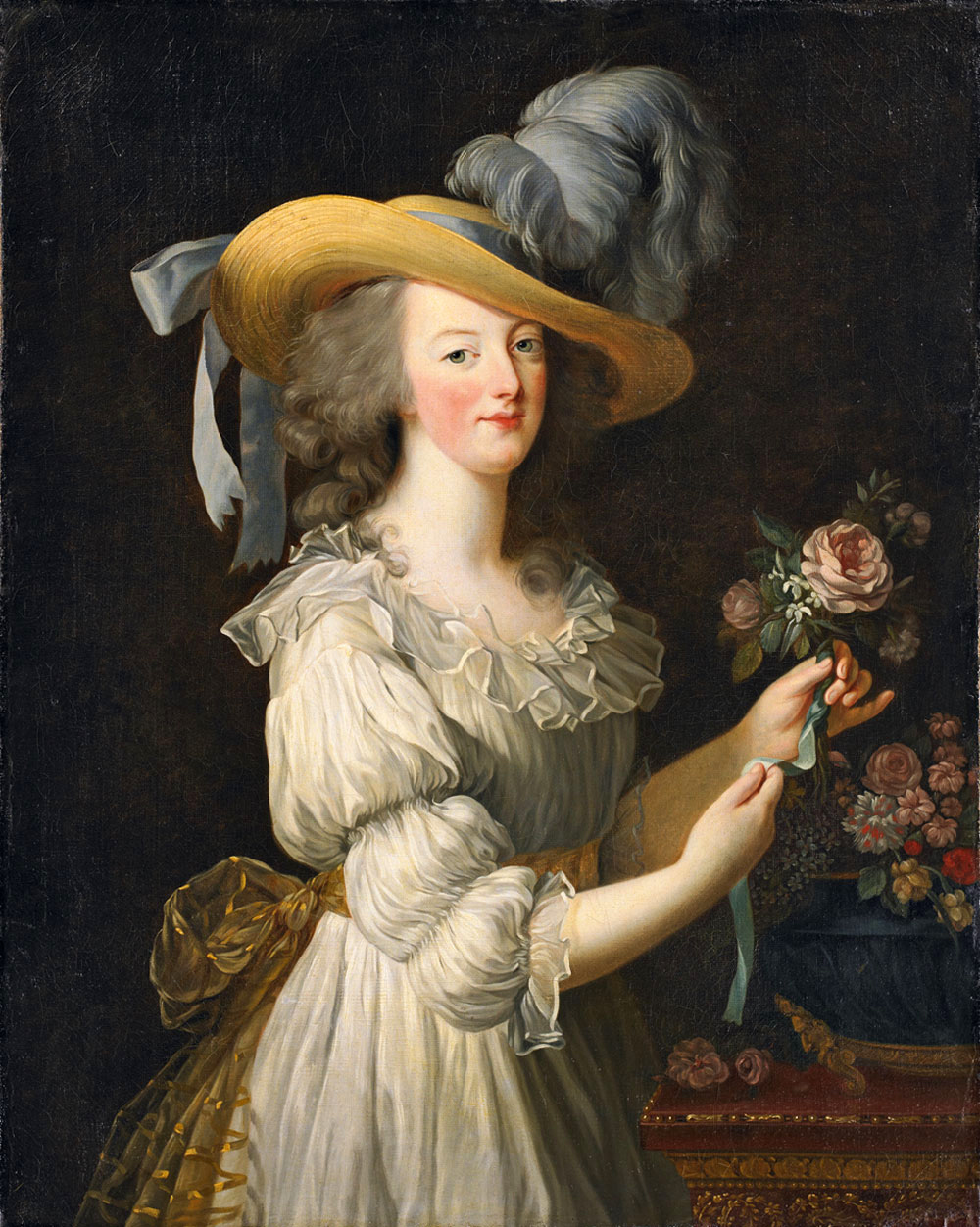
Marie Antoinette in muslin dress and wide-brimmed hat. By Élisabeth Vigée Le Brun (1783).

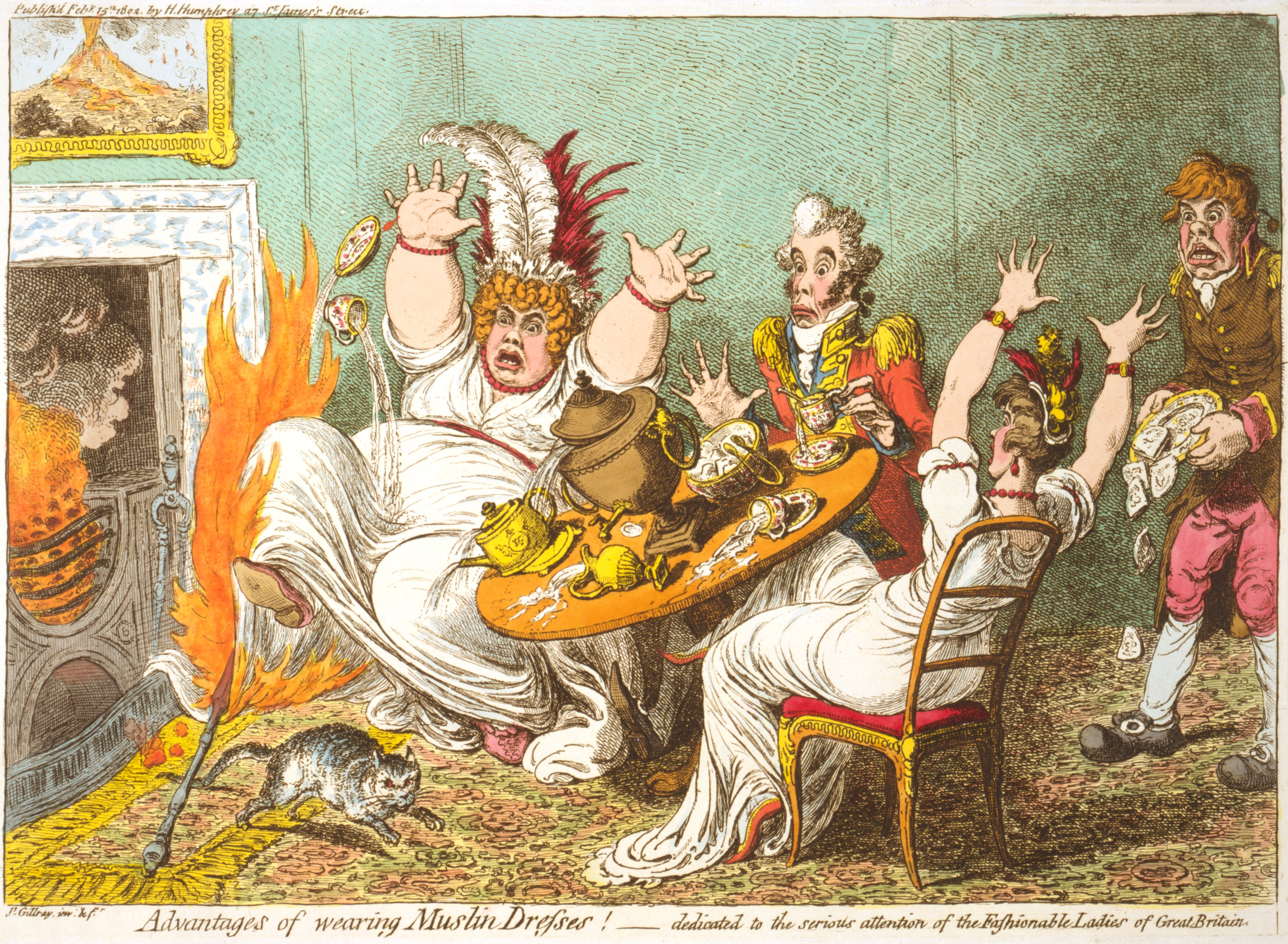
Fashionable—but inflammable—the robe anglaise resorted to muslin for lightness and volume. Hand coloured etching, by James Gillray (1802).

By the 1780s, hairstyles with the hair piled high and decorated with ostrich feathers were falling out of fashion and being replaced by a style consisting of long curls hanging loose, that could occasionally be powdered for greater formality. It is this new fashion that makes it possible for Willoughby to cut a lock of Marianne's hair in Sense and Sensibility.

As at the French court, where Marie Antoinette was setting the fashion for a "pastoral" style of clothing, women were wearing broad-brimmed hats decorated with ribbons. This is what Eliza de Feuillide, Jane Austen's cousin who is familiar with the receptions at Versailles, explains to Phylly Walter, another cousin, when she inquires after the latest fashions in France. This same Eliza complains in turn about the stiff fashions still being worn at the Court of St. James's where, she says, "she had to stand for two hours on end wearing a pannier dress whose weight was not negligible". At the same time as dresses with hoop skirts were becoming unfashionable, heavy brocade and embroidered silk fabrics too were disappearing, replaced by muslin dresses worn with petticoats to give them volume. This volume, and the vaporous appearance it gave these muslin dresses, were considered to give women a more natural silhouette. This natural fashion soon also became much more revealing, to an extent bordering on scandalous, as Eliza de Feuillide gleefully noted during a stay in Bath in 1798. For it was Bath, and still more London, that was the fashion leader.

When Jane Austen's characters talk about buying a dress, it means in fact that they are going to buy the necessary fabric, which they will then give to a specialised dressmaker who will make a dress to their specifications, based on the latest fashion in the capital. This is the case for Harriet Smith (in Emma) when she wants to obtain a pattern-gown (a dress from a pattern), to be made of the muslin she has just bought. Patterns for dresses in the latest London fashion were found in all the women's fashion newspapers, and based on these, the customer could explain to the dressmaker the particular adjustments she wanted made.

=== Homes ===
The homes in which Jane Austen's novels are set are all situated in the southern half of England, and with the sole exception of Mansfield Park, in counties and towns she knew personally. It is characteristic of Jane Austen's period that all sorts of houses exist there side by side, houses of very different origins, periods and status, and that the characters in her novels are sensitive to these differences. This diversity is the reflection of the successive strata of the English habitat.

Jane Austen's heroines thus occupy cottages (Barton Cottage in Sense and Sensibility), abbeys converted into vast residences (the titular Northanger Abbey, or Donwell Abbey in Emma), parks (mansions surrounded by a vast park, like Mansfield Park in the novel of the same name, or Rosings Park in Pride and Prejudice), courts (another type of mansion, in theory approached via a vast courtyard, like Sotherton Court in Mansfield Park), halls (manors, like Uppercross Hall in Persuasion), and finally simple houses, like Longbourn House, the home of the Bennet family in Pride and Prejudice. This is why Catherine Morland is so delighted when she discovers Northanger Abbey, thinking, "With all the chances against her of house, hall, place, park, court, and cottage, Northanger turned up an abbey, and she was to be its inhabitant."

The mansions referred to above can have so many works of art worth seeing that some of them receive visitors who come simply as tourists. In Jane Austen's novels, however, this is the case of only two of them, Pemberley and Sotherton Court, since even Mansfield Park does not possess an art collection fit to interest a tourist.

The layout of these traditional grand residences is not necessarily very rational: Sotherton Court, as well as Northanger Abbey, are laid out en suite, that is, each room opens into the next. On the other hand, much more modest but "modern" homes, like Longbourn in Pride and Prejudice, are organised in a way that is much better suited to their use: the public rooms where visitors or guests are received, dining room, drawing room, etc., are located on the ground floor, while the private rooms such as bedrooms are upstairs.

Interiors

In Jane Austen's England, interiors are very varied, both as a function of the wealth of the home, of course, and also as a function of its age. The walls are often papered, paper having been a less expensive substitute for the tapestries of noble homes since the 16th century. But it is not until the 18th century that manufacturing processes become capable of producing wallpaper whose appearance can satisfy people of quality. At the same time, some very fine wallpapers are being imported from China by the East India Company. Wallpaper is thus the indoor decoration typical of the well-off, and we see for example Edward Ferrars and Elinor, as soon as are they married and installed at Delaford, start looking for some to suit them. As for the impressive Gothic Northanger Abbey, Catherine Morland is very disappointed to find wallpaper on the walls of her room, which she was expecting to be much less prosaic.

In fine houses in the 18th century, however, the fashion is for wainscoting, with only the upper part of the wall papered. Paint, more expensive than wallpaper, is also preferred in sumptuous residences such as Rosings Park or Mansfield Park, since it permits contrasting colours, sometimes highlighted with gilding.

As for the floor, it is left bare if it consists of beautiful tile or paving; in the 18th century this is the case too for handsome parquet floors, which may be set off by a small Turkish rug placed in the centre of the room. At the same time, progress in the textile industry now makes it possible for companies in towns such as Kidderminster to produce carpets to cover the entire floor in the reception rooms.

The windows that let light into the rooms can be very different, going from leaded glass to modern sash windows, a style imported from France. When Catherine Morland arrives at Northanger Abbey, she is devastated to find that the reception rooms have been modernised, and that the gothic frames hold only large panes of glass allowing the light to flood in: "To be sure ... — the form of them was Gothic ... — but every pane was so large, so clear, so light! ... To an imagination which had hoped for the smallest divisions, and the heaviest stone-work, for painted glass, dirt and cobwebs, the difference was very distressing."

=== Meals and food ===
In Jane Austen's time meals are eaten late. Breakfast, in fact, is never eaten before ten o'clock, leaving time for various activities before this first meal: Edward Ferrars (Sense and Sensibility) walks to the village of Barton to inspect his horses, and Edmund Bertram (Mansfield Park) has a long conversation with Fanny Price, then a tense discussion with his brother Tom, and only afterwards does he go to breakfast.

After breakfast, there is no regular meal before dinner, which is never taken before three o'clock in the afternoon. It is however appropriate to offer light refreshments (cold meats, cakes and fruit in season) when a visitor arrives between these two meals.

After dinner, tea is taken at about six or seven o'clock in the evening, actually a high tea including a light meal. It is not until still later, about nine o'clock, that people sit down for the last meal of the day, supper.

But these times, late as they are, are the ones in use at the beginning of the 18th century. Towards the end of the century, times get even later. It is, moreover, good form (socially advantageous) to eat late, and Jane Austen's characters affirm, if not their actual social status, at least their concerns about it, by eating later still. At Barton Cottage, in fact, the home of Marianne's and Elinor's mother Mrs Dashwood (Sense and Sensibility), dinner is eaten at about four o'clock in the afternoon, as it is at Hartfield, the home of Emma Woodhouse's father. General Tilney, on the other hand, in Northanger Abbey, dines at six o'clock, while the rich and snobbish Caroline Bingley (Pride and Prejudice) does not dine until half past six, and her supper is not until about midnight.

At table, during a sit-down meal as opposed to light refreshments, the guests are offered two or three courses served à la française as it is called, that is, with all the dishes on the table at the same time, with each guest helping themselves only to what they want. These dishes, which can number from five to about twenty per course, include soup, large pieces of meat or fish served whole, poultry, vegetables, seasonal game, sauces and condiments, cakes, etc. When the first course is finished, the table is cleared and the second course brought in, with just as many dishes, sweet as well as savoury. Finally, after the second course, comes dessert, including pastries, fruit in season, dried fruits, nuts, ices, and dessert wines.

Such a large number of dishes – and the wealthier the home the more of them there are – requires the housekeeping to be of a very high standard, and costs a considerable amount of money. This abundance upon others' tables makes the miserly Mrs Norris (Mansfield Park) jealous, but she consoles herself with the "conviction of its being impossible among so many dishes but that some must be cold." Similarly Frank Churchill and Emma Woodhouse (Emma), seated beside each other at the time of the meal at the Coles' house, have to interrupt the lively conversation they are engaged in "to share in the awkwardness of a rather long interval between the courses".

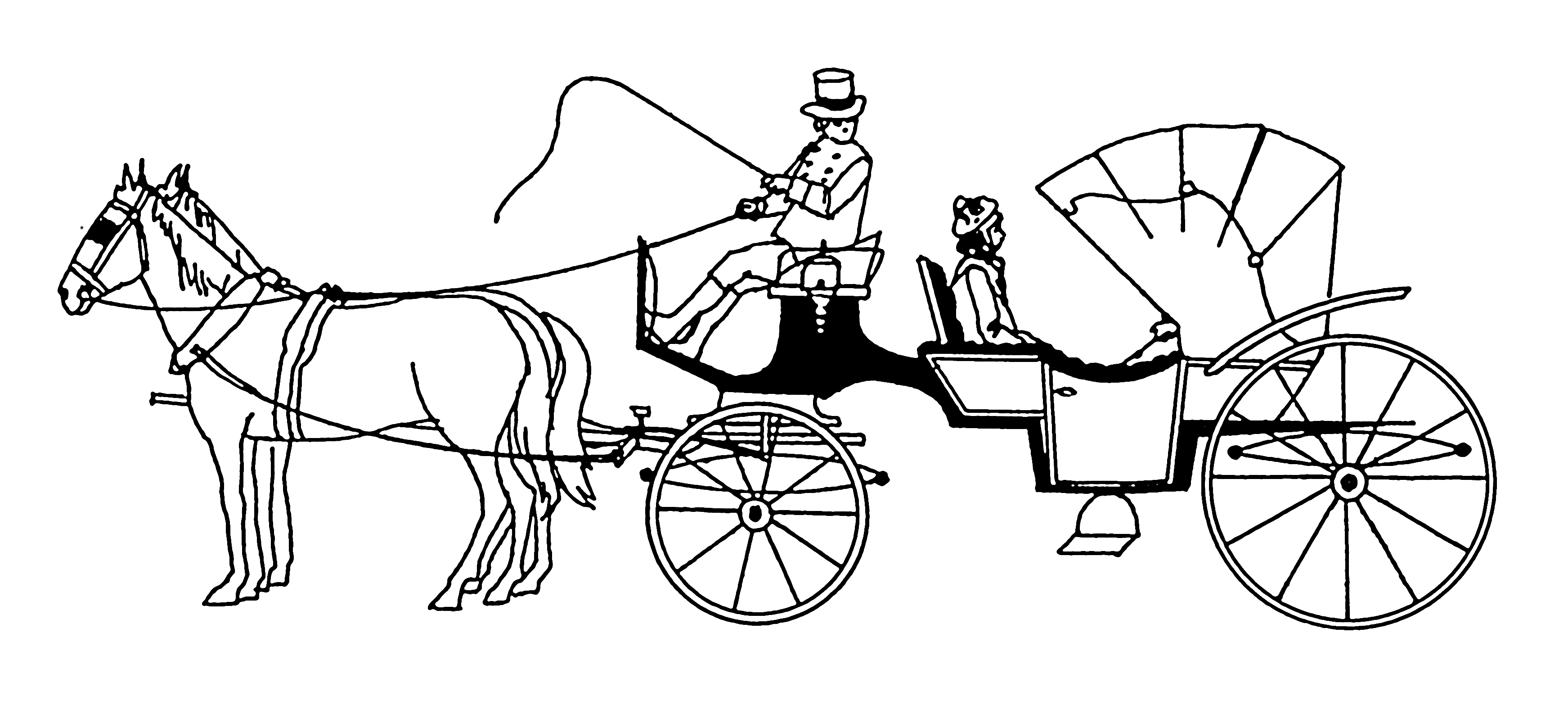
The barouche was the fashionable carriage of the time.

== Country life ==
=== Carriages ===
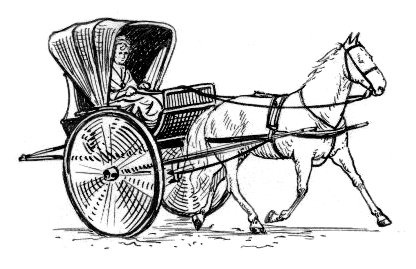
Gig, drawn by one horse.

Average speed for carriages of this time was seven miles an hour. When general Tilney left Bath for Northanger, his 'handsome, highly-fed four horses' performed the journey of thirty miles at a sober pace, broken into two stages with a two hours' rest in between. Even then, roads could be in poor state, as remarked by Mrs Norris, between Mansfield and Sotherton (Mansfield Park), or even snowy. Normally only the privileged who earned seven hundred to a thousand pounds a year could afford a carriage, and driving sporting gigs and curricles was largely the preserve of the fashionable, elite male.

== See also ==
- Jane Austen
- Georgian era
- Regency
- Marriage in the works of Jane Austen

== Bibliography ==
Major reference books

- Nicolson, Nigel. The World of Jane Austen. London: Weidenfeld and Nicolson, 1991.
- Todd, Janet, ed. Jane Austen in Context. Cambridge: Cambridge University Press, 2005.
- Deirdre Le Faye (2003). Jane Austen: The World of Her Novels. Frances Lincoln Adult. ISBN 978-0-7112-2278-6.
- Sales, Roger. Jane Austen and Representations of Regency England. London: Routledge, 1994.
- Hart, Roger. English Life in the Eighteenth Century. London: Wayland, 1970.

More specific aspects

- Giffin, Michael. Jane Austen and Religion: Salvation and Society in Georgian England. New York: Palgrave Macmillan, 2002.
- Batey, Mavis. Jane Austen and the English Landscape. London: Barn Elsm, 1996.
- Piggott, Patrick. The Innocent Diversion, Music in the Life and Writings of Jane Austen. London: Douglas Cleverdon, 1979.
- Selwyn, David. Jane Austen and Leisure. London: Hambledon Press, 1999.
- Byrde, Penelope. Jane Austen Fashion. Ludlow: Excellent Press, 1999.
- Neill, Edmund. The Politics of Jane Austen. London: Macmillan, 1999.
- Mooneyham, Laura G. Romance, Language and Education in Jane Austen's Novels. New York: St. Martin's Press, 1988.
