= Tysoe Hancock =

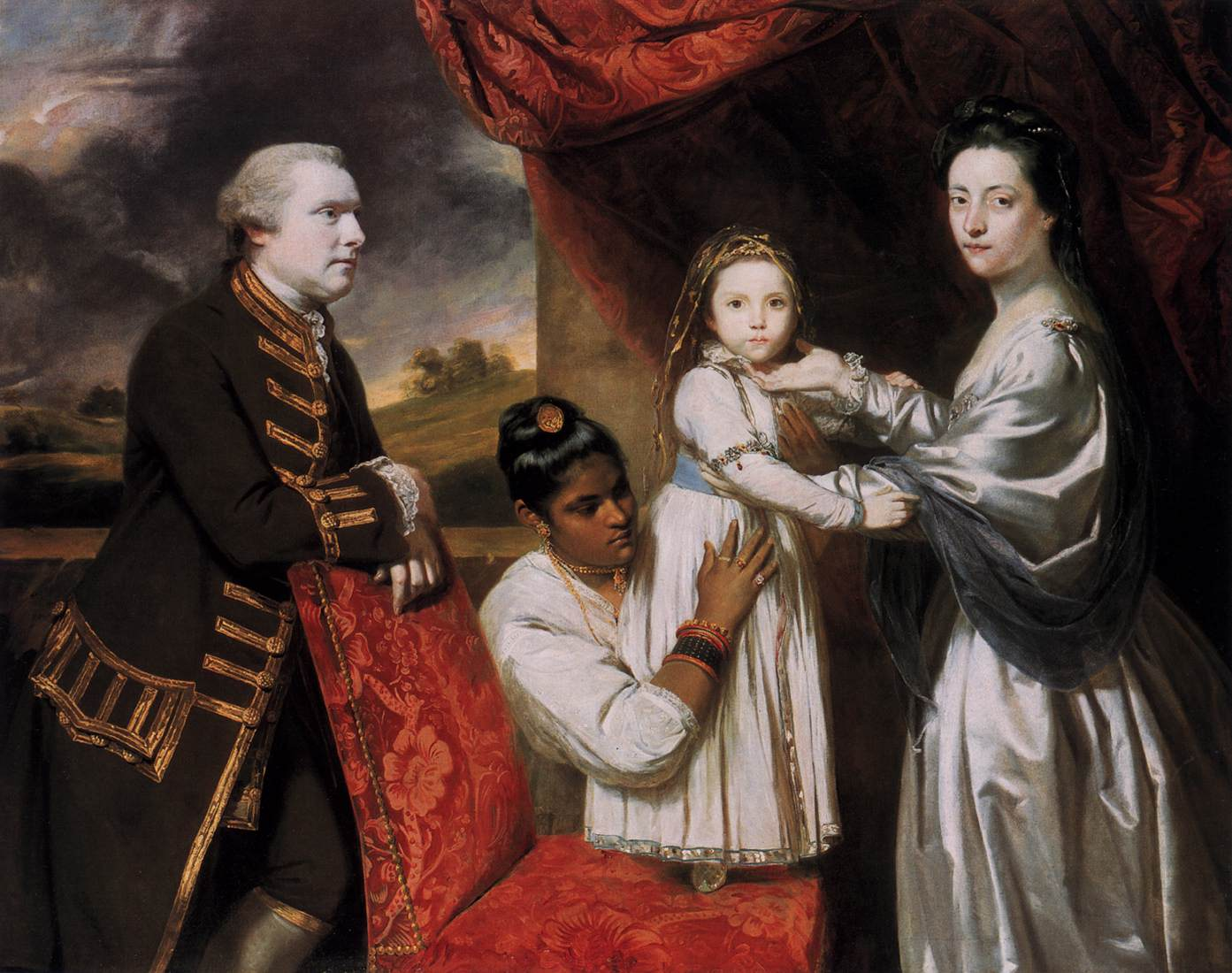
- Painting by Joshua Reynolds in the Gemäldegalerie Berlin showing Hancock, Indian maid Clarinda, daughter Elizabeth and wife Philadelphia, 1765
- Born: December 1723; Sittingbourne, Kent
- Died: November 5, 1775 (aged 51)
- Spouse: Philadelphia Austen Hancock
- Children: Eliza de Feuillide

Tysoe Saul Hancock (December 1723 – 5 November 1775) was a British surgeon who was employed by the East India Company (EIC) in the Madras Presidency. His daughter Eliza was referred to as the "exotic cousin" by Jane Austen. A painting depicting him with family, made by Joshua Reynolds had also been the subject of debate. He was also a close associate of Warren Hastings.

== Biography ==
Hancock was born in Sittingbourne, Kent where his father Reverend Thomas Saul Hancock was parish priest at nearby Hollingbourne. Tysoe Hancock studied medicine and sailed to India in 1745 and joined the East India Company in Madras. Hancock became a surgeon's mate at Fort St. David (Cuddalore, then called Porto Novo) in 1748 and became a surgeon in 1758 and moved to Bengal in 1759, where he became a friend of Warren Hastings, later Governor-General of British India. Jane Austen's father Reverend George Austen had a sister, Philadelphia, who sailed (on a husband-"fishing fleet" according to Jane Austen) to India in 1752 to seek a wealthy husband. Philadelphia Austen married Hancock in 1753 at Cuddalore. Their only daughter Elizabeth (Eliza, in earlier age also referred to as Betsy) was born in December 1761 and named in memory of the stillborn daughter of Warren Hastings, who was godfather to the baby. The family returned to England in 1765, but three years later Hancock was forced to seek a fortune and he set off again to India, without his family but accompanied by their Indian maid, Clarinda, who was returning home. Hancock suffered from poor health in India, including bouts of malaria, and died at Calcutta in November 1775, his grave now lost. Warren Hastings had created a trust for Eliza Hancock, and she received about 700 pounds a year from it. Philadelphia sought a finishing school education for her daughter in France and went on a tour in Europe in 1777 and their interactions in high society led to Eliza marrying Jean Capotte, Comte de Feuillide in 1781 (he was guillotined following the French Revolution, in 1794). Philadelphia died from breast cancer on 26 February 1792 and was buried in the St John-at-Hampstead cemetery. Eliza had a son Hastings de Feuillide born 25 June 1786 who died in his teens, possibly from epilepsy, on 9 October 1801. Eliza married Henry Austen in 1797, thereby becoming a sister-in-law to Jane Austen. She died on 25 April 1813.

A painting of the family was made by Joshua Reynolds with a series of sittings that began in August 1765, initially with the mother and child, followed by the father and with Clarinda on the 1st of October 1765. The painting, sold at an auction with the title of “A Family Group, with black Servant” and later as “Lord and Lady Clive with a child and a Hindoo nurse” which was identified in the 1830s as depicting Lord Robert Clive and his wife Margaret Maskelyne (1735–1817) who had also been aboard the same ship, the Bombay Castle, that carried the "fishing expedition" of Philadelphia Austen. David Mannings identified the group as representing not Robert but his cousin George Clive (1731/2–79) who married Irishwoman Sidney Bolton (1741/2–1814) in 1763 and travelled to India with Robert. A 2017 study clarified the identities of the subjects in the painting as being in fact of Hancock and his family.
