= Anne Sharp (teacher) =

English governess, friend of Jane Austen (1776–1853)

Anne Sharp (1776 – 8 January 1853) was an English governess and teacher who worked for Edward Austen Knight's family at Godmersham Park and became a close friend of Edward's sister, the writer Jane Austen.

While at Godmersham Park, Anne Sharp taught Jane Austen's niece, Fanny Knight. This period in her life is the subject of the 2022 novel Godmersham Park, by Gill Hornby. Little is known about Sharp's early life or how she came to be at Godmersham Park, and the novel gives a fictionalised account of her background.

Sharp met Jane Austen in 1805 while working for Edward, and their friendship continued after she left for other employment. Jane Austen's letters mention her and make it clear that Jane valued Anne's opinion of her published novels. Jane Austen's final letter from Chawton, written in 1817, appears to have been addressed to Anne Sharp. Sharp had dabbled in writing herself, having produced several theatrical productions of her own composition for the Austen family.

Sharp was dismissed from her employment by the Austens in 1806 for reasons that are unclear, but soon found work as a governess and later as a paid companion, though she had to give up these positions because of failing health. Jane Austen wrote to Anne in 1808 to inform her that her former mistress, Edward Austen's wife Elizabeth, had died. While Austen was working on Pride and Prejudice in 1811 and/or 1815, Anne Sharp visited her at Chawton, despite apparent opposition from Jane's sister Cassandra. Jane later sent her a presentation copy of her novel, Emma; this is seen as a sign of special favour, as the number of such copies available was small. It has been suggested that the character of Mrs Weston in Emma may have been partly modelled on Anne Sharp. Anne Sharp prized the gift enough to have it bound in calfskin.

By 1811 Sharp was working for Lady Pilkington, the widow of a baronet, Sir Thomas Pilkington, at Chevet Hall near Wakefield in Yorkshire, again as a governess to her mistress's daughters. This seems to have represented a rise in her status. Sharp's health continued to give her trouble, however, and her letters on the subject eventually led Jane Austen to suspect that her illnesses were partly psychosomatic. After Jane's death, her sister Cassandra sent Anne a lock of Jane's hair and her bodkin as keepsakes. By 1823, Sharp was running a girls' boarding school in Everton, near Liverpool, residing at 124 York Terrace. In his History of Everton (1830), Robert Syers described 'Miss Sharp [as] the conductress of a most respectable ladies' seminary', which was situated at 15-16 Everton Terrace. She died on 8 January 1853 and was laid to rest at St George's Church, Everton. She appears to have been relatively well-off financially by the time of her death.

== In fiction ==
In addition to being the heroine of Godmersham Park, Anne Sharp is a major character in Lindsay Ashford's 2011 crime novel, The Mysterious Death of Miss Austen.
