= Henry Thomas Austen =

Brother of Jane Austen

The Reverend Henry Thomas Austen
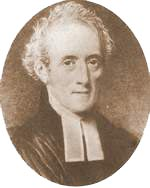
- Portrait of Henry Thomas Austen
- Born: 8 June 1771; Steventon, North Hampshire, South East England
- Died: 12 March 1850 (aged 78); Royal Tunbridge Wells, Kent, South East England
- Education: St John's College, Oxford
- Occupations: Militia officer Clergyman; Banker
- Known for: Brother of the novelist Jane Austen

Henry Thomas Austen (8 June 1771 – 12 March 1850) was a British militia officer, clergyman, banker and the brother of the novelist Jane Austen.

== Early life ==
=== Family ===
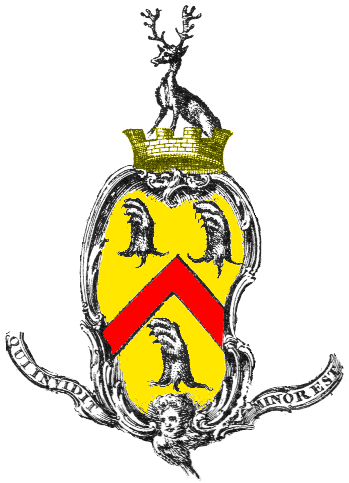
Coat of Arms of the Austen family, inscribed with a Latin motto: "QUI INVIDIT MINOR EST" (18th century)

Henry Thomas Austen was born in 1771 in Steventon, Hampshire. He was the fourth son born to his parents, Rev. George Austen and Cassandra Leigh (1739-1827). He had five brothers; James (1765–1819), George (1766–1838), Edward (1768–1852), Francis William (Frank) (1774–1865), Charles John (1779–1852), and two younger sisters, Cassandra and Jane.

In Steventon, he spent most of his time growing up with his Hancock family cousins at their family home, where he and his siblings were under the supervision of their aunt, Philadelphia Austen Hancock. In letters left behind by Jane, she describes the cousins as wealthy. In one letter, Jane recounts their older cousin, Betsy boasting of the gifts she had in her possession while they were growing up. During these years Henry took part in family theatricals, along with his cousin Eliza (née Hancock, later Eliza Feuillide) and his brother James, such as his live performance as the leading man in Susannah Centlivre's The Wonder: a Woman Keeps a Secret.

Henry was known by his family to be a clever teenager: Jane said that "he knew how to tease." His female cousins admired his flattery and he grew to be his father's favourite son, who was also adored by younger sister Jane. His father recognised his scholarly abilities and made sure that he and his older brother, James, were privately tutored; they took lessons in Greek and Latin. He and James were described by Jane as the "scholars" while Edward was more practical and Francis was a "man of action."

== Relationships ==
Henry Thomas Austen "'came out' socially" by the influence of his cousin Eliza, whose frequent visits to Steventon had a lasting impact on the Austen children. Henry spent an important amount of time with both Eliza and his brother James, during which they grew, both socially and personally, through theatre. While they did not participate directly being too young to act, Henry's sisters Jane and Cassandra were often observers and helpers with the theatrical activities.

Eliza continued to be a central figure in Henry's life, and kept in touch with both him and James. Henry spent a month with her in 1787, the year after which she visited the brothers at Oxford. Eliza stayed with the Austens following her husband's execution in 1794 in the French Revolution's Reign of Terror. Though Eliza had been flirting with both James and Henry since their theatre years, and both continued to develop an interest in her, Henry and Eliza were married in December, 1797. Shortly after resigning from the militia, during the period of time that the Treaty of Amiens was in effect, Henry and his wife returned to France in an attempt to reclaim Eliza's assets. This proved to be unsuccessful, and the two fled the country. Henry was widowed in 1813, when Eliza died.

After George Austen's death in 1805, the Austen brothers were responsible for their mother and two sisters. James and Henry were tasked with deciding how the brothers would provide an adequate allowance for the Austen women. Edward and Frank collectively contributed £150 per annum, leaving James and Henry to pledge £50 each per annum. It was financially stressful for them both, but Henry promised to "do as much as long as [his] precarious income remains." Henry eventually withdrew this support in 1816, after his bankruptcy.

Henry was described as "gregarious and socially ambitious," having engaged in several professions and telling his sister Jane of their exploits. He also actively gossiped about his sister's work, and his connections contributed to furthering its success.

Henry was said to be his sister Jane's favourite brother. He is mentioned numerous times throughout Jane's letters published by her great-nephew Lord Brabourne, and is the main subject of many of them. Jane paid close attention to her brother, writing at length on subjects such as who he danced with at a ball. Jane's letters omit the span of time in which Jane nursed Henry back to health from a debilitating illness, alongside the omission of the death of their father. Henry was present during the final two months of Jane's illness in 1817, and was one of the three people listed in her will.

Henry remarried in 1820. His wife, Eleanor Jackson, had known the Austen family for a time, and was regarded as "an excellent wife" by Henry's sister, Cassandra.

== Education and career ==
=== Education ===
Henry received a private education from his father at his family's home in Steventon, Hampshire. He began studying at St John's College, Oxford in 1788 on a Founder's Kin scholarship. He also spent time helping his brother James in publishing his magazine, The Loiterer, and was listed as one of the contributors. In 1792 he received his bachelor's degree and intended to become an ordained deacon and then clergyman. Once Austen had graduated, St John's College awarded him a scholarship and stipend. He stayed at John's College in pursuit of an MA, working as an Assistant Logic Reader and teaching undergraduates, until 1793 when war broke out between England and France.

=== Military career ===
Although Henry was only two months away from turning twenty-two, the age at which his older brother James had become a deacon (the usual age was twenty-three, but exceptions could be made), he decided against continuing to pursue a profession in the church, and instead accepted a commission in the Oxfordshire Militia as Lieutenant. He joined the Southampton unit in April 1793, where soldiers were protecting the English Channel against French invasion during the French Revolutionary Wars. Henry would occasionally take time off from the militia to resume his studies. In 1794, the colonel of the Oxfordshire regiment at the time, Colonel Spencer, appointed Austen as acting paymaster. In 1795, during his time as paymaster, Henry had the opportunity to serve under the order of Lieutenant Cornwallis in protecting Ireland from the French for seven months. Here, Henry made several connections with other rich and powerful figures whose influence contributed to his interest in pursuing a banking career. Henry Thomas Austen held his paymaster position for the rest of his military career, which came to an end in 1801.

=== Banking career ===
During his time as the Oxfords’ paymaster, Henry had earned the respect of his colonel, William Gore-Langton, who, in 1801, enabled Austen to begin his career as a financial agent by providing him with work for the Oxfordshire Regiment. As an agent, Austen primarily worked as a middleman between the government agency responsible for releasing military wages and the regiment's paymaster. However, there were several other ways Austen made profits: He collected the pay per company of a fictitious "warrant man," he worked as some officers’ private banker, as a half-pay agent, and participated in some buying and selling of commissions.

Henry began a financial partnership with Henry Maunde, who had served alongside Austen in the Oxfordshire Militia and took over as paymaster once Austen began his agent career. Together they formed Austen & Co., which operated for fifteen years, from 1801 to 1816.

The peace following the Treaty of Amiens in March 1802 made it difficult for Austen to continue profiting as much as he had previously from military finance. Thus, he and his wife Eliza travelled to France, where they shipped wine to well-off acquaintances back in England as an expensive commodity. This business was only lawful during times of peace, but Austen continued throughout both times of peace and war.

In May 1803, Austen & Co. moved to Parliament Street in London, closer to government offices. This was the beginning of a long line of more prestigious business opportunities taken by the company, one of which was with two additional regiments, the Nottinghamshire Militia and the North Devon Militia. The colonel of the North Devon Militia at the time was John Parker, the second Lord Boringdon. From this connection, Henry obtained a job giving Boringdon's sister drawing lessons.

In 1806, the Prime Minister William Pitt died, and a large political shift took place as a result. This realignment caused many people who Austen was close to, to rise in power, thus increasing the prestige of his connections. By late 1806, Austen & Co. had become the London correspondent for at least two country banks, and Henry Austen had secured a role as a partner in three banks. Also during this year, Henry's brother, Francis (Frank) Austen joined Austen & Co., forming Austen, Maunde, and Austen. In 1809, the company accepted a fourth member: James Tilson. James was the brother of John Henry Tilson, a Lieutenant-Colonel of the Oxfordshire Regiment, and had also previously been a partner in the Dorset & Co. Bank of New Bond Street. Austen, Maunde & Tilson lasted until its bankruptcy in 1816, which came about due to several overlapping causes, including Henry's ill health, some poor choices of investment, the general depression following the Napoleonic War, and the closing of many country banks.

=== Clergyman ===
After the collapse of Austen, Maunde & Tilson, Henry Thomas Austen decided to enter the church. In December 1816, he became an ordained deacon and was appointed curate of Chawton, Hampshire, where his mother and two sisters had lived since 1809. During his three years at Chawton, he was well respected as a preacher. In 1819, he was appointed curate at Farnham in Surrey, and during this time he also worked as a master at Farnham Grammar School. He eventually became the curate of Bentley in Hampshire.

== Anti-slavery activism ==
In 1840, Austen served as a delegate to the World Anti-Slavery Convention in London. He was one of two delegates from Colchester and sat among nearly 500 delegates who came from around the globe to seek an end to slavery.

== Involvement in the works of Jane Austen ==
Jane Austen's novels were published anonymously during her lifetime, as was the usual practice for female authors. Only her small circle of immediate family were aware of the publishing of Sense and Sensibility (1811) and Pride and Prejudice (1813) beforehand. Henry was known to gossip to his upper-class circle of friends and acquaintances about her novels in order to promote them and help her rise to fame.

Both Persuasion and Northanger Abbey, published after Jane's death, were prefaced by Henry, in a biographical notice. The notice is an ongoing topic of debate among scholars because of the ambiguity surrounding its author; It is widely thought to be not only published, but written by Henry, although some also theorise that it could just as well have been authored by Cassandra Austen. This is possible because Henry and Cassandra together organised the publishing of the two works in four volumes. After Jane's death in the summer of 1817, Henry had the books printed in December 1817 and started advertising them later that month.

Beyond helping her with the publishing process, Henry was also known to proof-read and edit Jane's work. In March 1814, Jane made sure that Henry read the proof copy of Mansfield Park before its release in July. In the autumn of 1815, Jane Austen offered her work, Emma, to publisher John Murray. Murray offered £450 in exchange for the copyrights of Emma, Mansfield Park, and Sense and Sensibility. Henry Austen stepped in and argued against Murray's poor terms, persuading Jane to keep her copyrights.
