= Eliza de Feuillide =

18th and 19th-century English sister-in-law of Jane Austen

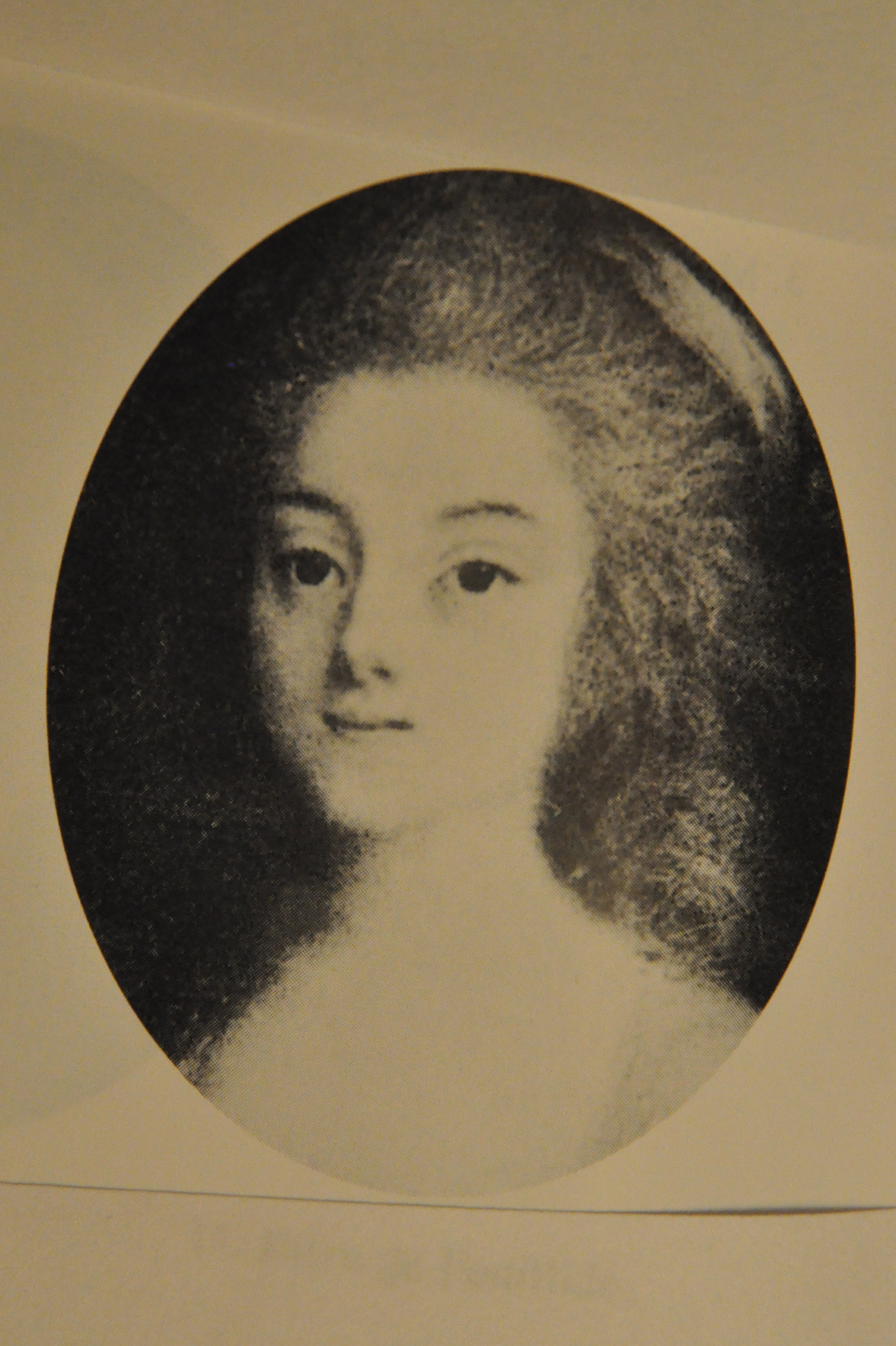
- Born: Eliza (Elizabeth) Hancock; 22 December 1761; Calcutta, Mughal Empire
- Died: 25 April 1813 (aged 51); London, England
- Buried: Cemetery of St John-at-Hampstead
- Spouses: Jean-François Capot, Comte de Feuillide (m. 1781; died 1794) Henry Thomas Austen (m. 1797)
- Issue: Hastings Louis Eugene Capot de Feuillide
- Father: Tysoe Saul Hancock
- Mother: Philadelphia Austen

Eliza Capot, Comtesse de Feuillide (née Hancock; 22 December 1761 – 25 April 1813) was the cousin, and later sister-in-law, of novelist Jane Austen. She is believed to have been the inspiration for a number of Austen's works, such as Love and Freindship, Henry and Eliza, and Lady Susan. She may have also been the model from whom the character of Mary Crawford from the novel Mansfield Park is derived.

== Biography ==
=== Background ===
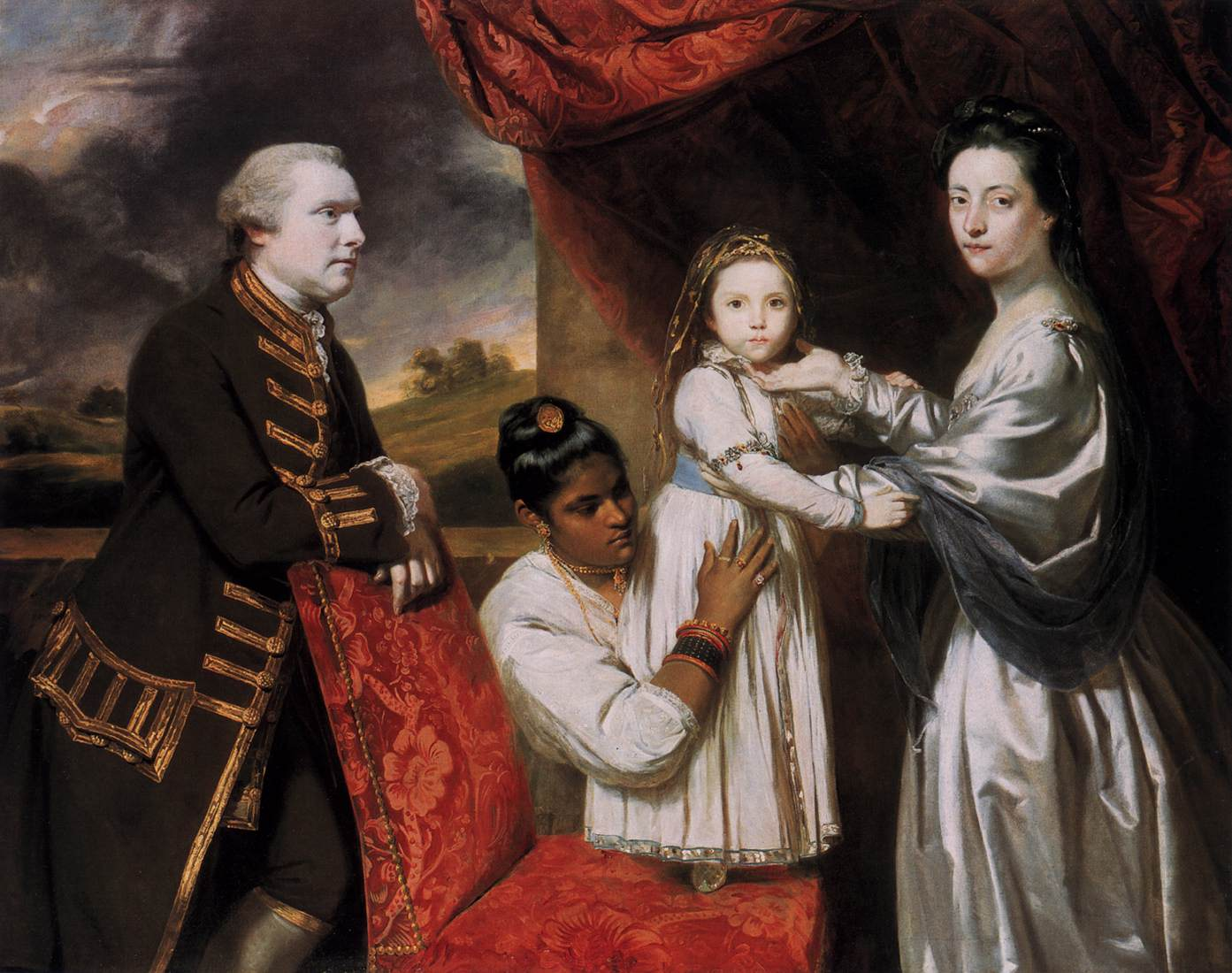
Painting by Joshua Reynolds in the Gemäldegalerie Berlin showing Eliza's father, Indian ayah Clarinda, Eliza and her mother Philadelphia, 1765

Elizabeth Hancock (who was mostly called "Eliza" and affectionately nicknamed "Betty") was born in India into an English gentry family. She was fourteen years older than her first cousin Jane Austen. She was the daughter of George Austen's sister Philadelphia, who had gone to India and married Tysoe Saul Hancock in 1753. Her father was a British surgeon employed by the East India Company. Eliza has been believed by some to be the natural child of her godfather Warren Hastings, later to be the first Governor-General of Bengal, a belief due to rumours circulated at the time by Jenny Strachey; but many points suggested that Eliza was indeed the daughter of Tysoe Hancock. She moved to England with her parents, in 1765. In 1779, she settled in France and two years later she married a wealthy French Army Captain, Jean-François Capot de Feuillide, who dubiously styled himself "Comte" (none of his parents or siblings were Comte/Comtesse). Eliza thus became Comtesse de Feuillide. She came back to England with her mother in 1790, after the beginning of the French Revolution. Her husband, who was loyal to the French monarchy, was arrested for conspiracy against the Republic during the Reign of Terror, and guillotined in 1794.

Her first cousin Henry Thomas Austen, brother of Jane Austen, then courted Eliza, and married her in December 1797; they had no children. Eliza's only son, Hastings (named after Warren Hastings), died in 1801.

Eliza died in April 1813, with Jane Austen at her bedside. Eliza and Austen had been quite close ever since their first meeting in 1786. She is buried in the cemetery of St John-at-Hampstead in North London.

== Eliza in Austen's works ==
=== Juvenilia ===
Love and Freindship
Love and Freindship [sic], is inscribed as follows

To Madame la Comtesse de Feuillide this novel is inscribed by her obliged humble servant The Author.

In this epistolary novel, Laura is writing to Marianne, the daughter of her most intimate friend, Isobel, comtesse de Feuillide. Her vocabulary includes a few French words, and she writes Adeiu (sic) before her signature. According to a letter from Eliza de Feuillide, the title of the novel had been derived by Jane Austen from the Latin phrase inscribed on the back of a miniature portrait given to cousin Phylly Walter by Eliza, Amoris et Amicitiae.

Henry and Eliza

Eliza and Henry Austen are generally considered to be pictured here. This would be a direct hint to the flirtation between the two that took place in real life. In Henry and Eliza, Eliza appears to be, if not a natural (illegitimate) child—as Eliza Hancock quite possibly was—at least a foundling.

=== Lady Susan ===
C. L. Thomson believed that Eliza de Feuillide was the model from which glamorous, shrewd and calculating Lady Susan had been created. Thomson argued that the courtship that took place between Henry Austen and Eliza de Feuillide is reflected in the novel by the courtship of Reginald de Courcy and Lady Susan; similarly, the letters written by Lady Susan to Johnson have the very style and tone of Eliza's own letters to Phylly Walter. On the other hand, B. C. Southam categorically rejected any biographical connection.

=== In Austen's major novels ===
Mansfield Park

It has often been said that flirtatious Eliza, with all her talent on stage, her vivacity and attractiveness, was the model for the character of Mary Crawford in Mansfield Park. Several other similarities link the character of Mary Crawford with Eliza: just as the fictional character, Eliza Hancock had learned to ride, and played the harp.

Likewise, the theatricals that play such a significant part in Mansfield Park are reminiscent of the plays in which Eliza de Feuillide was the leading lady in amateur productions, The Wonder – a woman keeps a secret, by Susannah Centlivre, and The Chances, a comedy by John Fletcher. The Austens' cousin Philadelphia Walter refused to come to Steventon with Eliza to take part in some of these plays, possibly because she disapproved of Eliza's behaviour: indeed, she had been visiting Eliza two months before, and came back with the memory of a dissipated life that [...] put me in mind that every woman is at heart a rake.

== Film reference ==
- Lucy Cohu plays Eliza de Feuillide in the 2007 film Becoming Jane, starring Anne Hathaway as Jane Austen.
