= Edward Austen Knight =

Brother of Jane Austen

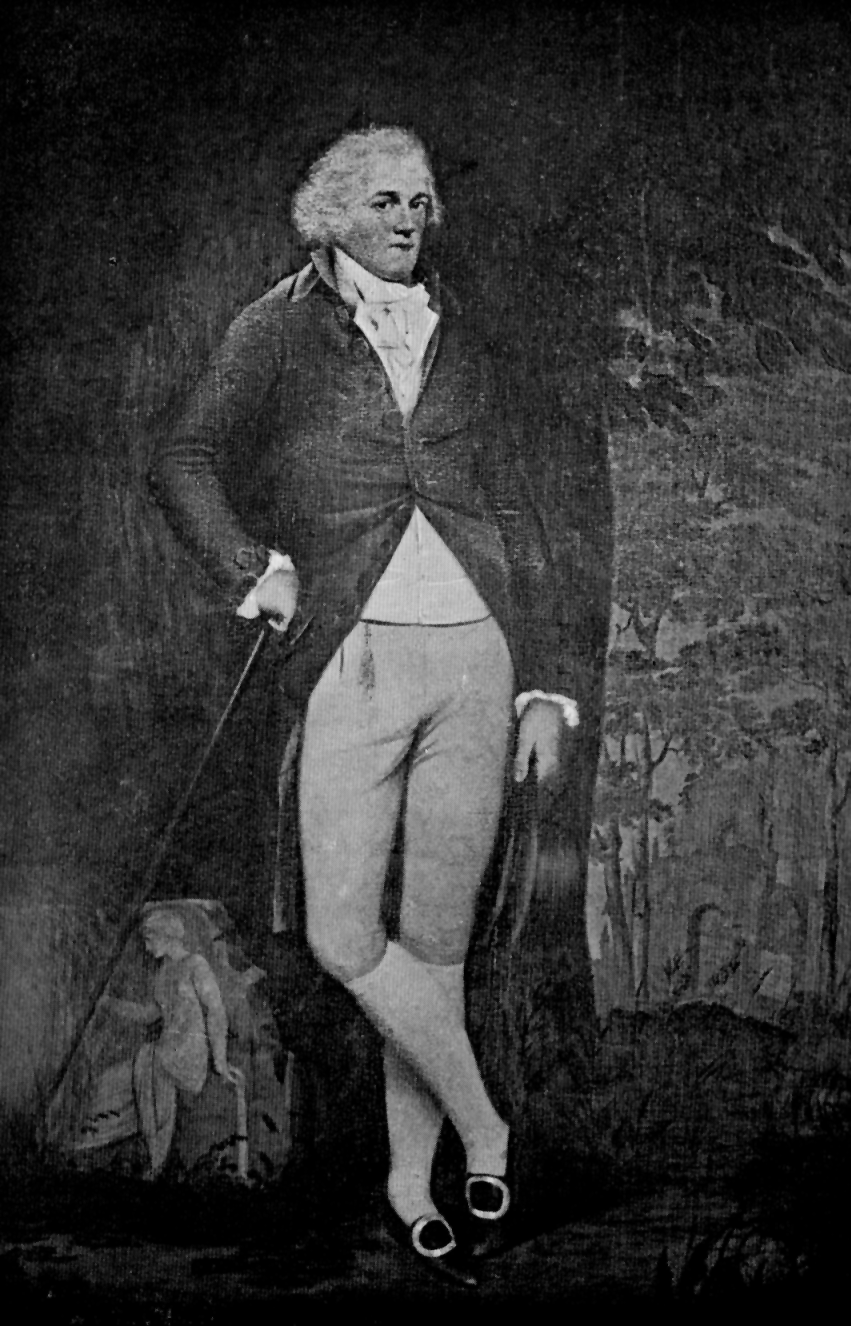
- Austen around 1788
- Born: 7 October 1767; Deane, Hampshire, England
- Died: 19 November 1852 (aged 85); Godmersham, Kent, England
- Occupation: High Sheriff of Kent
- Military Service
- Allegiance: Great Britain
- Branch: British Militia
- Service years: 1792–1800
- Rank: Captain
- Unit: East Kent Volunteers
- Conflicts: Napoleonic Wars
- Spouse: Elizabeth Bridges (m. 1791; died 1808)
- Children: 11
- Parents: George Austen; Cassandra Leigh
- Relatives: James Austen (brother); Henry Thomas Austen (brother); Cassandra Austen (sister); Francis Austen (brother); Jane Austen (sister); Charles Austen (brother); Philadelphia Austen Hancock (aunt)

Edward Austen Knight (born Edward Austen; 7 October 1767 – 19 November 1852) was the third eldest brother of Jane Austen, and provided their mother with the use of a cottage in Chawton where Jane lived for the last years of her life (now Jane Austen's House Museum). He was also High Sheriff of Kent in 1801.

== Family ==
Edward was born in Deane, Hampshire, the third of eight children born to Rev. George Austen and his wife, Cassandra Leigh (1739–1827). He had five brothers: James (1765–1819), George (1766–1838), Henry Thomas (1771–1850), Francis William (Frank) (1774–1865), Charles John (1779–1852), and two sisters, Cassandra and Jane Austen.

He married Elizabeth Bridges (1773–1808), daughter of Sir Brook Bridges, 3rd Baronet on 27 December 1791, and together they had eleven children:

- Fanny Catherine (1793–1882) (one of Jane Austen's favourite nieces)
- Edward (1794–1879)
- George Thomas (1795–1867)
- Henry (1797–1843)
- Reverend William (1798–1873)
- Elizabeth (1800–1884), who married Edward Royd Rice, had issue Fanny, Countess of Winchilsea
- Marianne (1801–1896)
- Charles (1803–1867)
- Louisa (1804–1889), second wife of Lord George Hill
- Cassandra Jane (1806–1842), first wife of Lord George Hill
- Brook John (1808–1878)

For a period, some of Edward and Elizabeth's children were taught by a governess, Anne Sharp, who became a close friend of Edward's sister Jane. Though she was with the family for only two years, Jane Austen remained in touch with Anne and referred to her as "an excellent kind friend".

== Knight inheritance ==
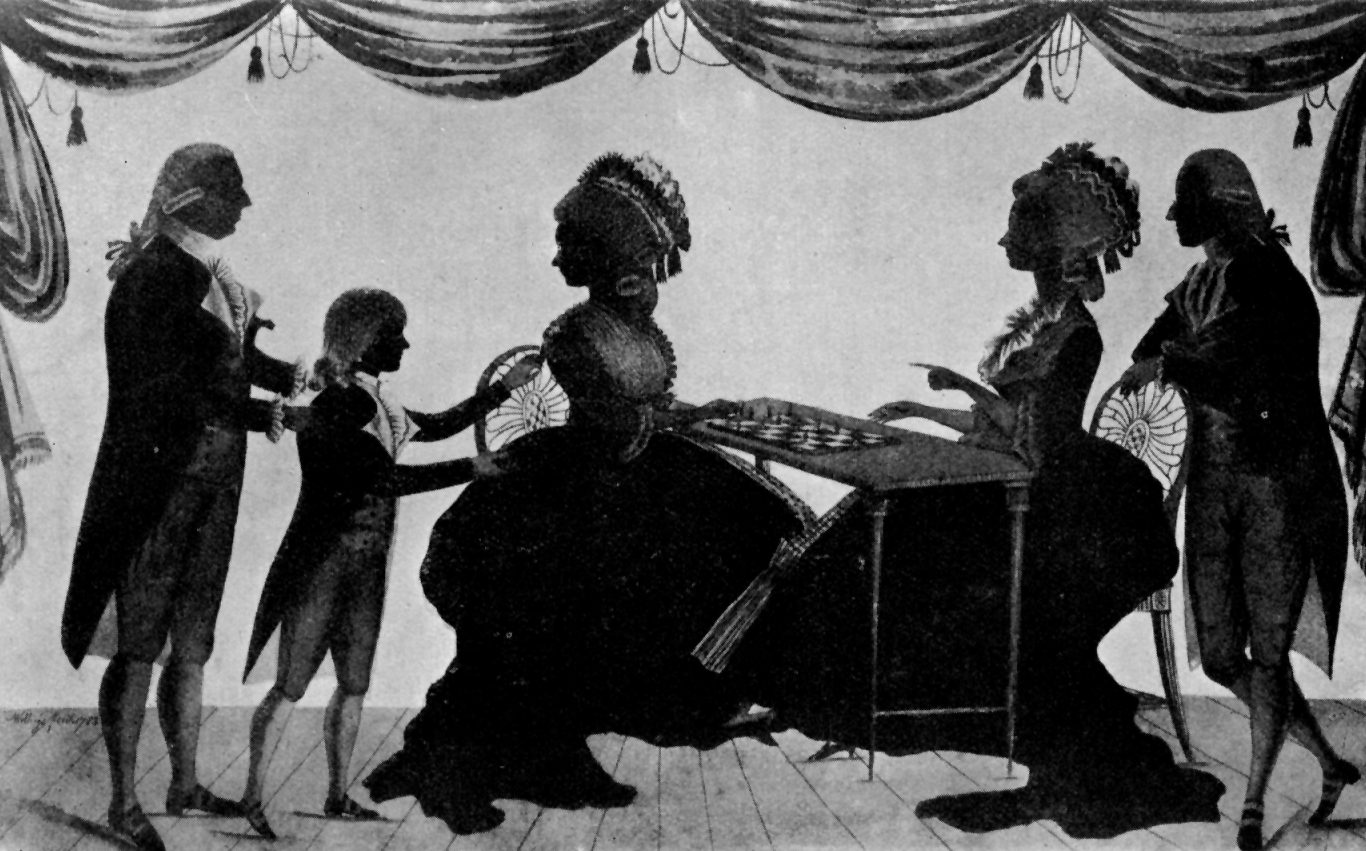
Presentation of Edward Austen to Thomas and Catherine Knight

When Edward was twelve years old he was presented to Thomas and Catherine Knight, who were relatives of his father and were wealthy. Thomas had given George Austen the living at Steventon in 1761. They were childless and took an interest in Edward, making him their legal heir in about 1783.

The Knights paid for Edward to go on a Grand Tour when he was 18 years old, and he recorded many of his experiences in his Journals. These have been edited by Jon Hunter Spence and published by the Jane Austen Society of Australia in 2004.

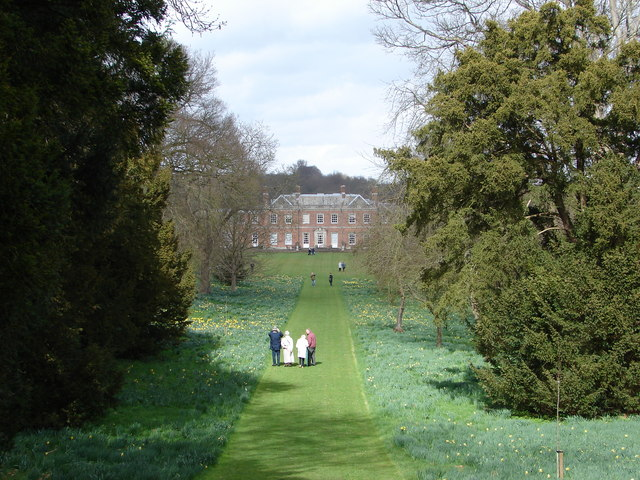
Godmersham Park, Kent

When Thomas died in 1794 he left the Godmersham Park estate to his wife for her life, with the remainder going to Edward. She left Godmersham before her death to move to Canterbury, and gave up the estates to Edward.

Edward inherited three estates from Thomas Knight, in Steventon, Chawton and Godmersham (which included a manor at Wittersham). The libraries from these estates were used extensively by Jane Austen. When war broke out with France, Edward raised and was appointed Captain of the Godmersham and Molash Company of the East Kent Volunteers.

In 1812 due to a stipulation in Catherine Knight's will, he legally changed his name to Knight.

== Estates ==
The rectory at Steventon, where the Austen family had spent their time growing up, and Jane is said to have written the first drafts of several of her books, was severely damaged by flooding and was knocked down by Edward in about 1823, and a new rectory was built by Edward for his son, William Knight, who had taken on the living.

Edward made several improvements to Chawton House, including planting a walled garden, and forming new parkland to take advantage of the views from the house.
