= Philadelphia Austen Hancock =

English socialite (1730–1792)

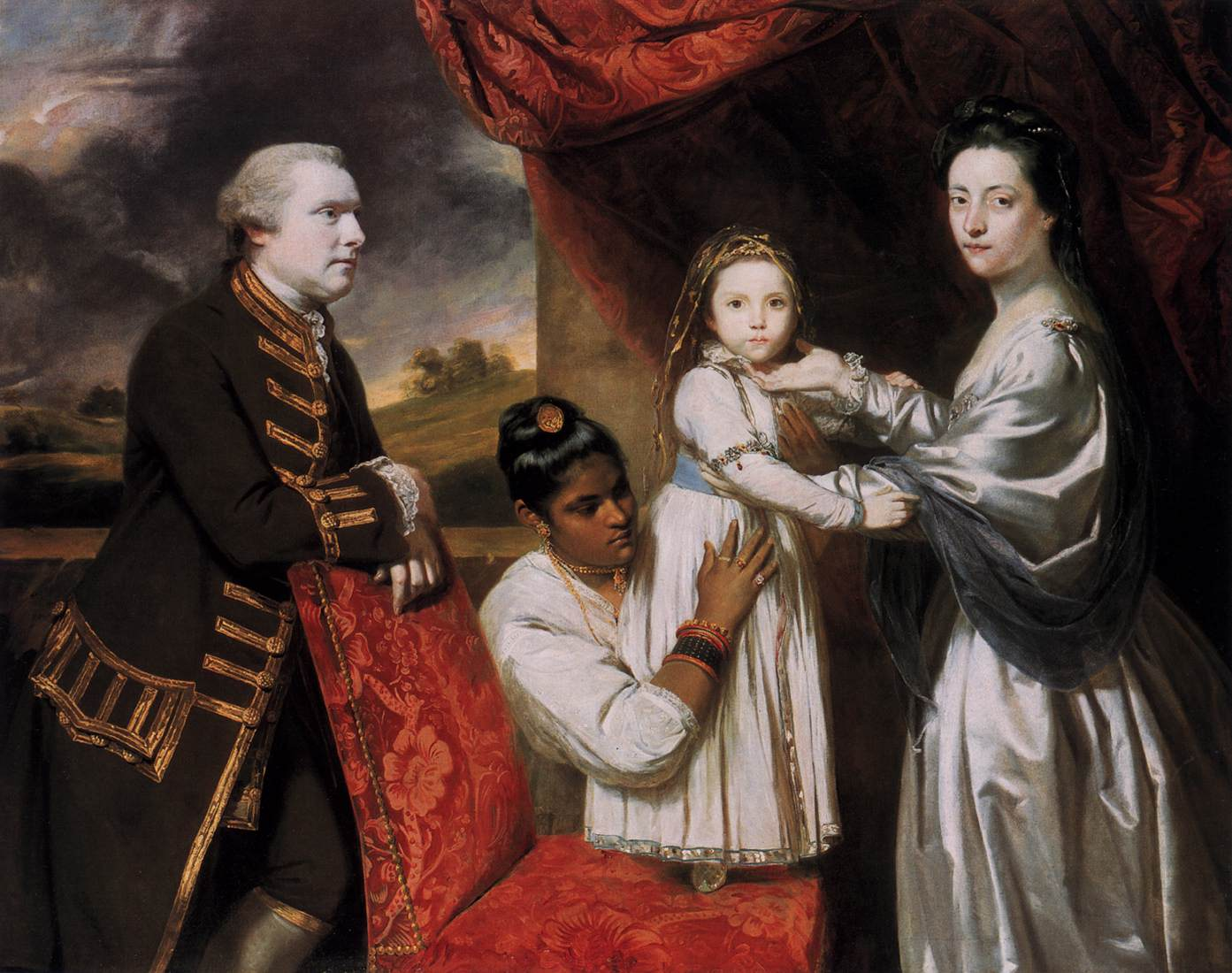
- Portrait of Hancock (right) with her family and maid
- Born: 15 May 1730
- Died: 26 February 1792 (aged 61)
- Resting place: St John-at-Hampstead, London
- Spouse: Tysoe Hancock
- Children: Eliza de Feuillide
- Parent(s): William Austen; Rebecca Hampson Walter
- Relatives: George Austen (brother); James Austen (nephew); Edward Austen Knight (nephew); Henry Thomas Austen (nephew; son-in-law); Cassandra Austen (niece); Francis Austen (nephew); Jane Austen (niece); Charles Austen (nephew)

Philadelphia Austen Hancock (15 May 1730 – 26 February 1792) was an English socialite and the aunt of Jane Austen. Throughout her life, rumours circulated in India and England that she was the mistress of Warren Hastings, who was the godfather and suspected father of her daughter, Eliza de Feuillide.

== Biography ==
Hancock was born Philadelphia Austen on 15 May 1730 into a family that was part of the landed gentry. Her father, William Austen, was a surgeon. Her mother, Rebecca Hampson Walter, had been married before. She was the older sister of Rev. George Austen, an Anglican clergyman and the father of novelist Jane Austen. Hancock was also the sister of Hampson Austen and Leonora Austen, and the half-sister of William Hampson Walter. Her mother died on 2 February 1733 and her father died in 1737. Left orphaned, the Austen children were sent to live with relatives and were financially cared for by a trust their father had set up. George and Leonora went to live with their wealthy uncle, Francis Austen of Sevenoaks, and Philadelphia was sent to live with the Freeman family, who were wealthy relatives on her mother's side.

On 9 May 1745, Hancock was apprenticed to a milliner named Mrs. Cole in Covent Garden. She completed her apprenticeship but, as she had no substantial dowry, she decided to focus on marrying a wealthy husband. Her uncle served as a financial agent to Tysoe Saul Hancock, a respectable surgeon and member of the East India Company. She set sail for Madras in British India on 18 January 1752 aboard HMS Bombay Castle, with expectations of marriage. Officially, the reason for her trip was to visit friends who lived at Fort St. David. She arrived in India on 8 August 1752. On 22 February 1753, she married Hancock in Cuddalore. The couple lived at Fort St. David until 1759, when they moved to Fort William in Calcutta. It was during this time that she became friends with East India Company employee Warren Hastings. Hastings was the British Resident in the Bengali capital of Murshidabad at the start of a meteoric career. After Hasting's wife died in 1759, Hancock helped care for the children. Hastings later gifted her a rosewood Indian writing desk inlaid with ivory to thank her for her assistance.

In December 1761, Hancock gave birth to a daughter, Eliza, who was named after the stillborn daughter of her godfather, Hastings. Even prior to the birth, rumours circulated throughout society that Hastings, not her husband Tysoe Hancock, was the biological father.

In 1765, the Hancocks returned to England aboard HMS Medway, accompanied by their Indian servants: Dido, Diana, Silima, and Clarinda. They arrived in London in the summer of 1765.

The artist John Smart painted a miniature portrait of Hancock, likely in 1768. Struggling financially, her husband returned to India with their maid, Clarinda, where he died in 1775. Philadelphia's daughter received an annual income of £700 a year from a £10,000 trust set up by Hastings, which provided for the family. Hancock went on a tour of Europe in 1777 with the intentions of finding a finishing school to send her daughter to. They first visited Germany, followed by Belgium in 1778. By October 1779 they settled in Paris, where they were introduced to Marie Antoinette and Marie Thérèse Louise of Savoy, Princesse de Lamballe. Hancock's connections in Parisian high society led to the marriage of her daughter to Jean Capot, Comte de Feuillide in 1781. Following her daughter's marriage, she went to live with her in Nérac. They travelled to England to visit relatives and settle financial problems on multiple occasions, eventually settling back there during the French Revolution.

Hancock died from breast cancer on 26 February 1792. She is buried in the churchyard at St John-at-Hampstead in London.
