= Charles Austen =

British Royal Navy admiral (1779–1852)

Rear-Admiral Charles Austen CB
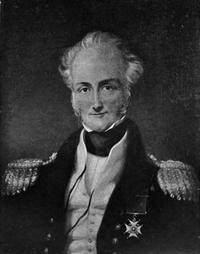
- Austen as a rear-admiral
- Born: 23 June 1779; Steventon, Hampshire
- Died: 7 October 1852 (aged 73); Prome, British Burma
- Spouse(s): Frances Palmer (m. 1807; died 1814) Harriet Palmer (m. 1820)
- Relatives: George Austen (father); James Austen (brother); Edward Austen Knight (brother); Henry Thomas Austen (brother); Cassandra Austen (sister); Francis Austen (brother); Jane Austen (sister); Philadelphia Austen Hancock (aunt)
- Military career
- Allegiance: United Kingdom
- Branch: Royal Navy
- Service years: 1791–1852
- Rank: Rear-Admiral of the Blue
- Commands: HMS Indian; HMS Swiftsure; HMS Cleopatra; HMS Namur; HMS Phoenix; HMS Aurora; HMS Winchester; HMS Bellerophon; East Indies and China Station
- Awards: Companion of the Order of the Bath

Rear-Admiral Charles John Austen CB (23 June 1779 – 7 October 1852) was an officer in the Royal Navy and the youngest brother of novelist Jane Austen. He served during the French Revolutionary and Napoleonic Wars, and beyond, eventually rising to the rank of rear-admiral.

== Family and early life ==
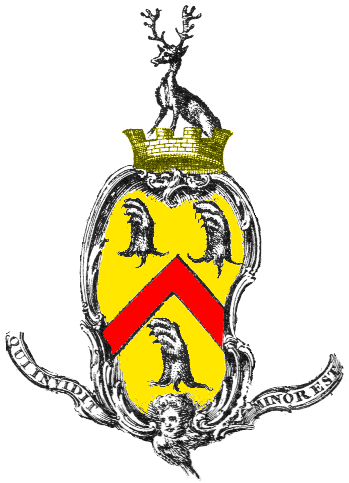
Coat of Arms of the Austen family

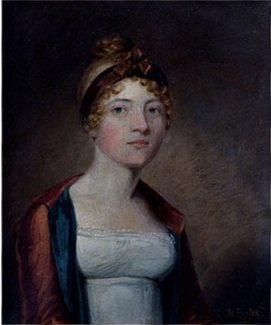
Portrait of Frances Palmer, 1st wife of Charles Austen (1810)

Charles was born in 1779 as the sixth and youngest son of the Reverend George Austen and his wife, Cassandra Leigh.

His elder brother, Sir Francis Austen, also joined the Navy, and eventually became an admiral of the fleet.

Charles joined the Royal Naval Academy in July 1791, and by September 1794, he had become midshipman aboard HMS Daedalus. He subsequently served aboard HMS Unicorn and HMS Endymion. While serving aboard the Unicorn, Austen assisted in the capture of the 18-gun Dutch brig Comet, the 44-gun French frigate Tribune, and the French transport ship Ville de l'Orient.

After transferring to Endymion he helped in the driving into Hellevoetsluis of the Dutch ship of the line Brutus. As a result of the latter action Austen was promoted to lieutenant on 13 December 1797, and appointed to HMS Scorpion. He was aboard Scorpion long enough to be present at the capture of the Dutch brig Courier, after which he transferred to HMS Tamar. Aboard Tamar, Austen was frequently involved in attacks and engagements with gunboats and privateers out of Algeciras. He returned to the Endymion in April 1800. On one occasion he set off in a small boat in a gale with only four other men, and succeeded in boarding and taking possession of the 18-gun Scipio, with 149 men aboard. (Note: Endymion captured Scipio in early 1800.) He kept control of her until the following day when Endymion could complete the capture. (Note: His sister, the famed novelist Jane Austen, wrote "Charles has received £30 for his share of the privateer, and expects £10 more; but of what avail is it to take the prizes if he lays out the produce in presents to his sisters? He has been buying gold chains and topaz crosses for us. He must be well scolded.") After his continued good service under Captain Charles Paget, the Admiralty promoted Austen to commander and he took command of the sloop HMS Indian on 10 October 1804.

== Command ==
Austen spent the next five years serving on the North American Station, based at St. George's Town, at the East End of the developing Imperial fortress of Bermuda (where the Royal Naval Dockyard had yet to be completed at the West End), in British North America. He was promoted to Commander and given command of HMS Indian, a sloop newly built in Bermuda (when ashore, he lived at Alnwick, near to Convict Bay and St. George's Garrison). He was promoted to captain on 10 May 1810 when he was given command of the 74-gun HMS Swiftsure, which was then the flagship of Sir John Borlase Warren. Austen moved again the following September, joining HMS Cleopatra. Between November 1811 and September 1814 Austen served as captain of HMS Namur, based at the Nore and flying the flag of Sir Thomas Williams. He was then given command of the 36-gun frigate HMS Phoenix and after the outbreak of hostilities with France Austen was dispatched in command of a squadron with HMS Undaunted and HMS Garland to hunt a Neapolitan squadron suspected to be at large in the Adriatic. After Naples had surrendered Austen was active in the blockade of Brindisi. Lord Exmouth then sent him on to search of a French squadron, but with the end of the war with France in the intervening period he briefly turned his attention to suppressing piracy in the region. He successfully captured two pirate vessels in the port of Pavos, but disaster struck when the Phoenix was wrecked off Smyrna on 20 February 1816, through the ignorance of her pilots.

Austen was appointed to the 46-gun HMS Aurora on 2 June 1826, and was sent to the Jamaica station as the second in command. He was active in combating the slave trade and had considerable success, intercepting a number of slave ships bound for the United States and the Spanish colonies of Cuba and Puerto Rico. He commanded the Aurora for two and a half years, until she was paid off in December 1828. Sir Edward Griffith Colpoys nominated Austen to become his flag captain aboard HMS Winchester on the North American and West Indies Station. Austen remained here until being forced to be invalided home after a severe accident in December 1830. Austen recovered and returned to service, being appointed to HMS Bellerophon on 14 April 1838. He was awarded a pension on 28 August 1840. During the Oriental Crisis of 1840, Britain waged an undeclared war against Mohammed Ali the Great, the vali (governor) of Egypt who was attempting to make the House of Ali the new ruling family in the Ottoman Empire by deposing the House of Ottoman. He sailed with the Bellerophon to the Mediterranean, and was active at the bombardment of Acre on 3 November 1840. As a result of his good service during the bombardment he was appointed a Companion of the Order of the Bath on 18 December 1840. Austen and the Bellerophon returned home, where the latter was paid off in June 1841.

== Flag rank and death ==
Austen was advanced to rear-admiral on 9 November 1846, and was appointed commander-in-chief in the East Indies and China Station on 14 January 1850, hoisting his flag the following day.

He commanded the British expedition during the Second Anglo-Burmese War but died of cholera at Prome on 7 October 1852, at the age of 73.

On 30 April 1852 Austen had been thanked for his services in Burma by the Governor-General of India, The Marquess of Dalhousie, who subsequently also formally recorded his regret for Austen's death.

Austen is buried in the Esplanade Cemetery, in Trincomalee, Sri Lanka his grave was rediscovered in 1984/1985.

There is a monument in his honour at the Esplanade burial ground in Trincomalee. There is also a memorial at St. Anne’s Church in Portsmouth for Austen.

== Family and issue ==
Austen married Frances Palmer, the youngest daughter of the late Attorney General of Bermuda, in 1807. The two had three children together. After the death of Frances in 1814, Charles married his late wife's sister Harriet Palmer in 1820, which was at that time contrary to church law and illegal in England, remaining so until the passage of the Deceased Wife's Sister's Marriage Act 1907 . The couple produced four children, two of them sons, and one of whom followed his father into the Navy. Austen was close to his elder sister Jane, and is said to have offered naval vocabulary to help her revise the second edition of Mansfield Park.

== Footnotes ==
Notes

Citations

Military offices
Preceded by Sir Francis Collier	Commander-in-Chief, East Indies and China Station; 1850–1852	Succeeded by Sir Fleetwood Pellew
