= Cassandra Austen =

British artist (1773–1845)

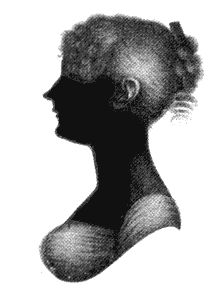
- Silhouette of Cassandra Austen
- Born: 9 January 1773; Steventon, Hampshire, England
- Died: 22 March 1845 (aged 72); Portsdown Lodge near Portsmouth, Hampshire, England
- Parents: George Austen; Cassandra Leigh
- Relatives: James Austen (brother); George Austen (brother); Edward Austen Knight (brother); Henry Thomas Austen (brother); Francis Austen (brother); Jane Austen (sister); Charles Austen (brother); Philadelphia Austen Hancock (aunt)

Cassandra Elizabeth Austen (9 January 1773 – 22 March 1845) was an amateur English watercolourist and the elder sister of Jane Austen. The letters between her and Jane form a substantial foundation for scholarly understanding of the life of the novelist.

== Childhood ==
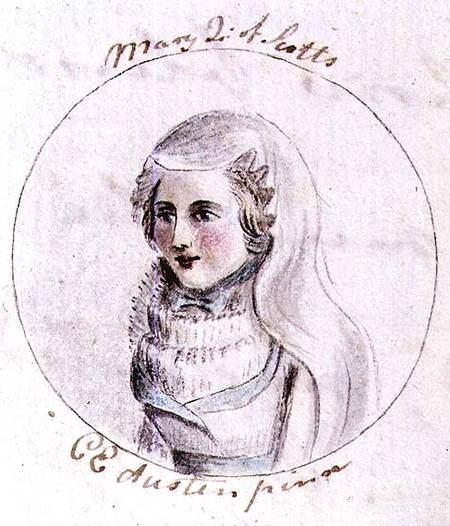
Cassandra Austen's drawing of Mary, Queen of Scots, from her sister Jane's manuscript The History of England (circa 1790)

Austen was born in 1773 at a rectory in Steventon, Hampshire, to the Reverend George Austen (1731–1805), a rector, and his wife Cassandra, née Leigh (1739–1827). Jane Austen was one of eight children, and she and her sister Cassandra were the only daughters in the family. The two shared a lifelong and particularly close bond. More than one hundred of Jane's surviving letters to Cassandra have provided valuable insight into the novelist's personal life and relationships, offering historians important details about her daily experiences.

The sisters went to Mrs. Cawley, their uncle's sister, to be educated in 1783. Cawley lived initially in Oxford, and later in Southampton, but when a typhus epidemic broke out in Southampton, they returned to Steventon after both contracted the disease. Between 1785 and 1786 they attended the Reading Abbey Girls' School. Jane was originally not to go, as she was considered to be too young for boarding school, but ended up attending along with her sister.

In their mother's words, "If Cassandra's head had been going to be cut off, Jane would have hers cut off too."

== Art ==
The two Austen girls were also tutored at home in drawing and the piano. In 1791, Cassandra produced a series of circular illustrations of British monarchs for Jane's manuscript The History of England, which are noted to have resembled members of the Austen family more than royalty. Cassandra Austen is also credited with having created two paintings of her sister. One, painted in 1804, is a back view of Jane seated by a tree. The other is an incomplete frontal portrait dated circa 1810. Austen's family had reservations about Jane's real appearance: Anna Austen (Mrs Lefroy) called it "so hideously unlike". Also a 1870 watercolour by James Andrews of Maidenhead, based on Cassandra's sketch, and a Lizars's engraving, were criticized by Anna's half-sister Caroline for the treatment of Jane's eyes. The sketch is now housed in the National Portrait Gallery, London.

== Later life ==
George Austen was not wealthy and had supplemented his income as a country parson "by taking in pupils and tutoring them for Oxford". After graduating from Oxford University, in 1794, one former pupil, Thomas Fowle, became engaged to Cassandra Austen. Fowle needed money to marry and went to the Caribbean with a military expedition as chaplain to his cousin, General Lord Craven. There, Fowle died of yellow fever in 1797. Austen inherited £1,000 from him, which gave her a little financial independence but, like her sister, she never married.

After the death of her father in 1805, Austen, her sister, and their mother moved to Southampton, where they lived with their brother Francis Austen (family name "Frank") and his family for five years. They moved again in 1809 to a cottage in the village of Chawton on their brother Edward's estate.

Jane died in 1817, and Cassandra is reported to have destroyed two-thirds of Jane's letters in 1843, a couple of years before her own death. There has been much debate about the reasons that may have led Cassandra to the decision to destroy a substantial part of Jane's letters. Some scholars, including Devoney Looser, believe that, most likely, these letters, of very personal and intimate content, may have put the writer in a bad light, as had happened to Frances Burney in the 1840s. She passed the remainder on to relations as mementos. Austen continued living at Chawton, at first with her mother and a family friend, Martha Lloyd. After her mother's death in 1827, Martha left the household to marry Cassandra's brother, Frank, the following year. Cassandra remained alone at the cottage but continued to maintain contact with her friends and family through regular visits. On one such visit to her brother Frank in March 1845, she suffered a stroke. Frank, who was still a serving admiral at the age of 71, was preparing to depart to take command of the Royal Navy's North American Station and was obliged to leave his stricken sister at his home (Portsdown Lodge, Widley, near Portsmouth) in the care of another brother, Henry. She died there a few days later on 22 March 1845, aged 72. Her body was returned to her home village of Chawton for burial at St. Nicholas' Church alongside her mother.

== Film portrayals ==
- Lucy Cohu plays Cassandra with Danielle Green playing a younger version in The Real Jane Austen (2002), starring Gillian Kearney as Jane.
- Greta Scacchi plays Cassandra in the BBC drama Miss Austen Regrets (2007), starring Olivia Williams as Jane.
- Anna Maxwell Martin plays Cassandra in the film Becoming Jane (2007), starring Anne Hathaway as Jane.
- Keeley Hawes and Synnøve Karlsen play Cassandra in the 2025 miniseries Miss Austen.
