= George Austen (cleric) =

Father of novelist Jane Austen

- Born: 1731
- Died: 21 January 1805 (aged 73–74)
- Education: Tonbridge School; St John's College, Oxford
- Spouse(s): Cassandra Leigh (1764–1805, his death)
- Children: James; George; Edward; Henry Thomas; Cassandra Elizabeth; Francis William; Jane; Charles John

George Austen (1731 – 21 January 1805) was a cleric of the Church of England, rector of Deane and Steventon in Hampshire. He is known as the father of Jane Austen.

== Early life ==
Austen was the son of William Austen, of Tonbridge, Kent, a physician, and his wife Rebecca Hampson, the daughter of Sir George Hampson, 4th Baronet, also a physician. George and his sister Philadelphia were orphaned when George was nine years old, and he was taken under the wing of his wealthy uncle Francis Austen. He attended Tonbridge School and St John's College, Oxford.

After being matriculated at the University of Oxford by St John's College on 2 July 1747, aged sixteen, Austen graduated BA on 12 February 1751, promoted to MA by seniority in 1754. He was a proctor in 1759 and graduated as a Bachelor of Divinity in 1760.

== Career ==
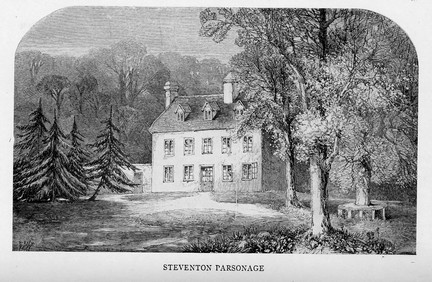
Steventon Rectory

In 1764, the living at Deane was purchased for Austen by his uncle Francis. The living at Steventon was "given to him by his cousin Mr. Knight".

Toward the end of 1800, Austen retired and the Steventon living was transferred to his son James. With his wife and daughters Cassandra and Jane he went to live in Bath, Somerset, and died there in 1805.

His granddaughter Anna Lefroy later recalled:

I have always understood that he was considered extremely handsome, and it was a beauty which stood by him all his life. At the time when I have the most perfect recollection of him he must have been hard upon seventy, but his hair in its milk-whiteness might have belonged to a much older man. It was very beautiful, with short curls about the ears. His eyes were not large, but of a peculiar and bright hazel. My aunt Jane’s were something like them, but none of the children had precisely the same excepting my uncle Henry.

== Marriage and family ==
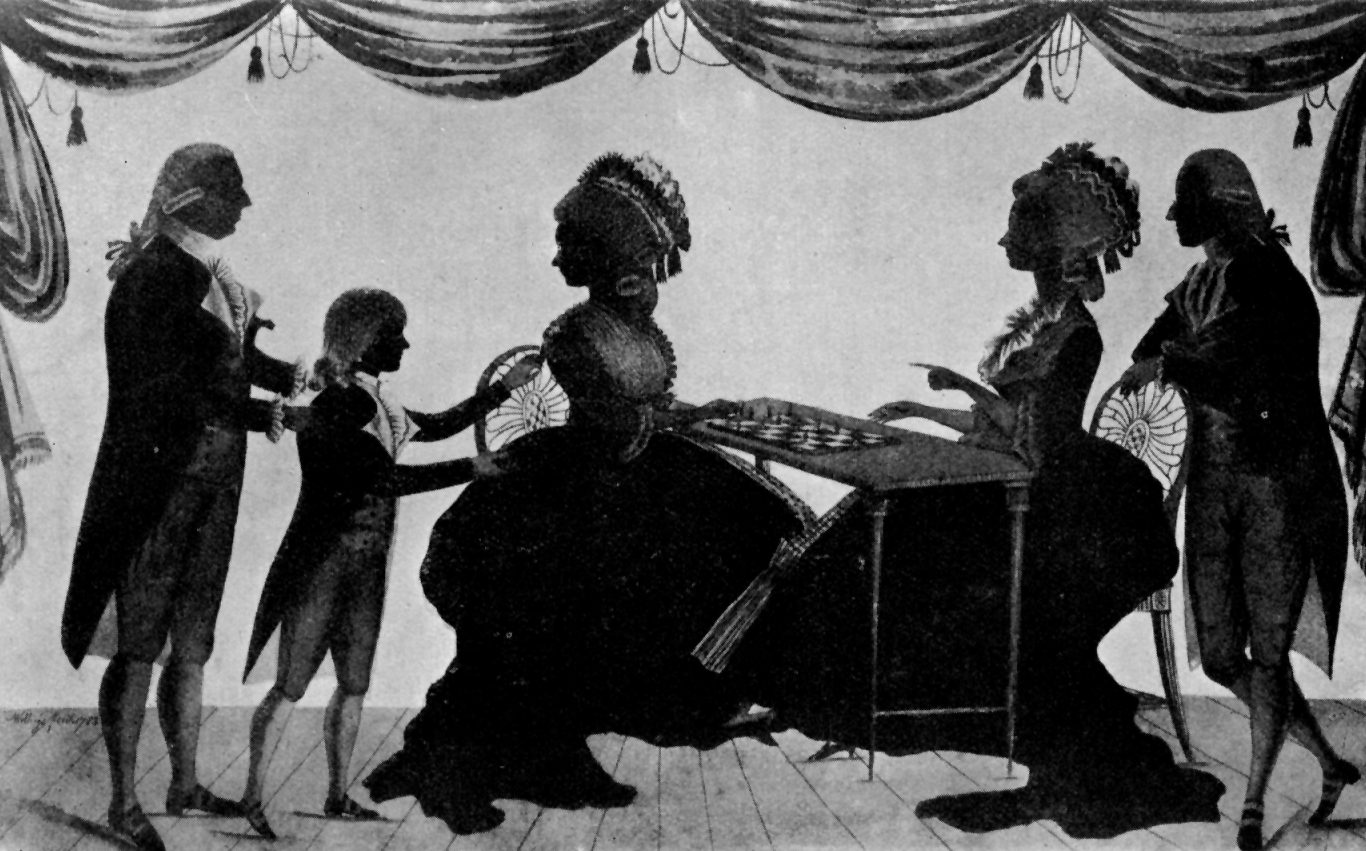
The Rev. George Austen presenting his son Edward to their relatives Mr and Mrs Thomas Knight, who adopted him

Austen met Cassandra Leigh while he was a student at Oxford. They married on 26 April 1764 and began their married life living in the rectory at Deane; in 1771 they moved to Steventon Parsonage, the birthplace of their daughter Jane. They had eight children:

1. James Austen (1765–1819)
2. George Austen (1766–1838)
3. Edward Austen Knight (1767–1852)
4. Henry Thomas Austen (1771–1850)
5. Cassandra Austen (1773–1845)
6. Sir Francis Austen (1774–1865)
7. Jane Austen (1775–1817)
8. Charles John Austen (1779–1852)

Their second child, George Austen, suffered from severe epilepsy, and did not grow up in the family home.

Austen's wife came from a clerical family, with links to St John's College, Oxford, and was able to claim descent from one of the college founders, giving her sons the right to attend the college without paying for tuition, as founder's kin. James and Henry Thomas Austen both attended St. John's College.
