= Self-Control (novel) =

1811 novel by Mary Brunton

Self-Control is a novel by the Scottish novelist Mary Brunton, published in 1811. The novel, which had some success in its own time, tells a rocambolesque tale, which inspired Jane Austen when she wrote her Plan of a Novel. Part of the author's intention in writing the work was to show "the power of the religious principle in bestowing self-command", while rebutting the idea that a reformed rake makes the best husband.

== Plot ==
The heroine, the devout Laura Montreville, is pursued by the lecherous rake Colonel Hargrave. Realising that he has offended her, the Colonel gives Laura a more honourable proposal of marriage, but she refuses him gently on grounds of moral incompatibility, despite this meaning that she would miss out on the Colonel's title and fortune. Captain Montreville, Laura's father, finds out that Laura's annuity is not assured, and so takes Laura to London to fix the matter. Without the knowledge of her father, Laura consents to marry the Colonel eventually, if he can reform himself within two years.

When Laura is left without any money in London, she decides to support her ailing father by selling sketches. During her time in London, a man named Montague De Courcy begins to fall in love with her. De Courcy buys Laura's sketches in secret. Hargrave meanwhile follows Laura to London and becomes involved in an affair with a married woman. He meets Laura in the shop where she sells her sketches and paintings, and accompanies her home and harasses her. Hargrave's affair is discovered by the husband of his lover and the two men fight a duel. Hargrave wounds the husband, and then goes to Laura, urging her to marry him, before she has found out about his affair. Because Hargrave threatens to kill himself, Laura faints, and is found by her father, who then realises that Hargrave has been threatening his daughter, and she has been encouraging Hargrave. This causes Captain Montreville such grief that he dies the next morning.

After the death of Captain Montreville, Laura goes to live with Lady Pelham, her maternal aunt, who helps her to receive her annuity, but she is not religious and colludes with Colonel Hargrave. Laura learns of Hargrave's duel, and resolves to refuse him. Hargrave attempts to persuade her to marry him by more drastic measures – having her arrested under false pretenses and tricking her into joining a gambling party. When Lady Pelham dies, Hargrave kidnaps Laura and takes her to the wilderness of America. He plans to rape and then force Laura into marriage. She then fakes her own death by escaping down the rapids in a canoe, to which she ties herself. Hargrave commits suicide and Laura returns to her home country, where she marries Montague De Courcy and has five children with him.

== Publication ==
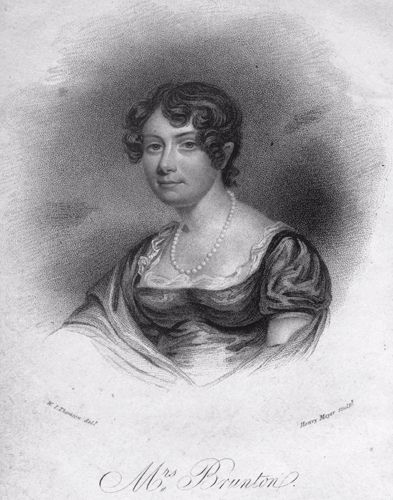
Mary Brunton, from the second edition of Emmeline (1820).

The first edition was published in February 1811 in two volumes, with a run of 750 copies, for the price of 21 shillings, of which 500 had been sold out by the end of the month. The novel was dedicated to the poet Joanna Baillie, who read the novel and offered some criticisms to Brunton. A second, revised edition was published in May 1811. A pirated edition was published in the United States in 1811, at a time when there was no copyright agreement between the two countries. Self-Control went through three editions in its first six months of availability, accounting for a total of around 3000 copies.

Jane Austen wrote to her sister Cassandra in 1811, "We have tried to get Self-control, but in vain. I should like to know what her estimate is, but am always half afraid of finding a clever novel too clever, and of finding my own story and my own people all forestalled." Kathryn Sutherland explains Jane Austen's comments on Self-Control as Austen being worried by Brunton's success, as Self-Control was selling wildly during the time Austen was preparing Sense and Sensibility for publication.

A French translation was published in 1829. Twenty years after its initial publication, Self-Control was included in the Standard Novels series.

== Reception ==
Despite the success of Self-Control at the time, Anthony Mandal noted that scholars had been dismissive of Brunton. In The Eclectic Review, the sequence of events was described as improbable. The reviewer also found it hard to believe that Laura would regret having to turn down Hargrave initially, as "we only have the word of the author" that this was the case.

The British Critic noted that this was a polarising work. It regarded the moral of the story as being excellent, and the improbable situations in the novel not beyond the realms of possibility. It noted that some situations had been softened in the second edition. It considered Hargrave to be a hero of the story. The Scots Magazine criticised the "strained and improbable incidents" throughout the book, characterising them as the desperation of a romance novelist to impress her audience. Even so, it praised the "lively portraits of character" in the novel and the emotional expressions, finding an emotional realism in the novel despite its improbable situations. The Times Literary Supplement wrote that Self-Control seemed to draw on Samuel Richardson's Clarissa and Frances Burney's Cecilia.

In October 1813, Jane Austen wrote "I am looking over Self Control again, and my opinion is confirmed of its being an excellently-meant, elegantly-written work, without anything of nature or probability in it. I declare I do not know whether Laura's passage down the American river is not the most natural, possible, everyday thing she ever does." When writing her Plan of a Novel, Austen wrote to her niece: "I will redeem my credit... by writing a close imitation of 'Self Control' as soon as I can. I will improve upon it. My heroine shall not only be wafted down an American river in a boat by herself. She shall cross the Atlantic in the same way, and never stop till she reaches Gravesend."

In 1999, Kate Fullagar wrote that Self-Control "is clearly concerned with the difficulty of a woman earning her own living and with the importance of female financial independence."

== Adaptations ==
A radio drama adaptation was broadcast on BBC Radio 4 in 2011.
