= The Beautifull Cassandra =

Short novel from Jane Austen's juvenilia

The Beautifull Cassandra [sic] is a short novel from Jane Austen's juvenilia. It is a parody of the melodramatic, sentimental and picaresque novels of the time, and tells the story of a young woman who sets off into the world to make her fortune.

== Style ==
Austen creates the characters and pastiche without authorial embellishment, in a brief work compressing twelve chapters into three pages. She sets the tone for this style in a dedication – "to Miss Austen" – that parodies flowery literary praise: "Madam, You are a Phoenix [...] Your person is lovely [...] your conversation is rational and your appearance singular".

Austen then progresses to a story in which the heroine is "lovely & amiable & chancing to fall in love with an elegant Bonnet [...] walked [out] [...] to make her fortune". All three of the listed characteristics, and the result, have precedents in the literature of Austen's period, and each would evoke a series of associations in the mind of the reader; but Austen restructures the associations by the fashion in which she gives each of these particular items the same effect on the outcome. This readjustment creates a new perspective of accepted motifs and allows Austen to place herself outside of the framework of a single genre, raising fairy tale, or even nursery rhyme expectations, only to disappoint them. Such flexibility on the part of the author results in richer characterisations: Cassandra is constructed in fewer than thirty sentences and Austen relies on the audience's appreciation of the references she makes to issues of lineage, adventure, expectations of beauty and typical relationships.

This small character has her own being, both within the text and on her own – one that reflects much of the life that would be brought to Austen's later characters: her mischievousness, and even delinquency, are especially typical of Austen's adolescent work, with extreme behavior and self-indulgence providing the prevailing tone. Thus, for example at a pastry-shop, Cassandra “devoured six ices, refused to pay for them, knocked down the Pastry-Cook and walked away”, concluding to herself at the end of all her similarly delinquent adventures that“ 'This is a day well spent“.

== Later influence ==
- In her dedication to Cassandra of her unfinished novel Catherine, or The Bower, Austen begins, “Encouraged by your warm patronage of The Beautiful Cassandra....”.
- Lydia Bennet in Pride and Prejudice carries on some of the anarchic and transgressive energy of the beautiful Cassandra.

== See also ==
- Where the Wild Things Are
