= Love and Freindship =

Juvenile Novella by Jane Austen

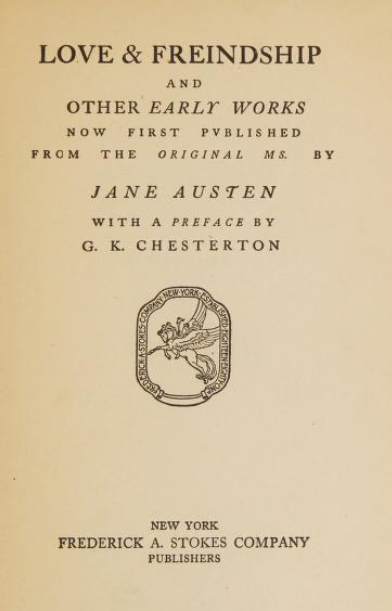
- Title page for Love and Freindship (1922 edition)
- Author: Jane Austen
- Language: English
- Publication date: c. 1790
- Publication place: UK

Love and Freindship [sic] is a juvenile story by Jane Austen, dated 1790. While aged 11–18, Austen wrote her tales in three notebooks. These still exist, one in the Bodleian Library and the other two in the British Museum. They contain, among other works, Love and Freindship, written when she was 14, and The History of England, written at 15.

Scholars consider it a significant milestone in Austen's development as a novelist, particularly in its parody of the “cult of sensibility.”

== Overview ==
Written in epistolary form like her later unpublished novella Lady Susan, Love and Freindship is thought to be one of the tales she wrote for the amusement of her family. It was dedicated to her cousin Eliza de Feuillide, known as "La Comtesse de Feuillide." The installments, written as letters from the heroine, Laura, to Marianne, the daughter of her friend Isabel, may have come about as nightly readings by the young Jane in the Austen home. Love and Freindship (the misspelling is one of many in the story, and is generally left uncorrected) is clearly a parody of romantic novels Austen read as a child. This is clear even from the subtitle, "Deceived in Freindship and Betrayed in Love," which undercuts the title.

In form, the story resembles a fairy tale in featuring wild coincidences and turns of fortune, but Austen is determined to lampoon the conventions of romantic stories, down to the utter failure of romantic fainting spells, which always turn out badly for the female characters. The story shows the development of Austen's sharp wit and disdain for romantic sensibility, characteristic of her later novels.

The 2016 film Love & Friendship is a film version of Lady Susan, borrowing only the (spelling-corrected) title from Love and Freindship.

== Synopsis ==
In an exchange of letters, Isabel asks Laura to share her life story with Isabel's daughter Marianne, suggesting that at fifty-five years of age, Laura is now safe from the travails of love. Laura bristles a little at this reference to her age but agrees to write to Marianne to convey useful life lessons.

In her initial letters, Laura recounts her youth living happily with her parents. Her peaceful existence, however, is disrupted when a handsome young man named Edward Lindsey arrives at their door one evening. Edward immediately proposes marriage, and she accepts immediately.

Edward is the son of a baronet and is supposed to marry someone else, but he deliberately disobeys his father's wishes. At first, the marriage is happy.

The couple then visits Edward's friends, Augustus and Sophia, who also defied their parents to marry. Augustus had stolen money from his father before eloping with Sophia, but at the time of the visit, they are broke and in substantial debt. Laura and Sophia became instant friends, attracted to one another because both were creatures of sensibility, demonstrated by their fainting together on a sofa.

Laura further explains that Augustus was arrested for his unpaid debts. Edward leaves to help his friend but does not return. Laura and Sophia decide to flee to escape debt. They briefly travel to London seeking Augustus, but Sophia feels that she could not see him in distress, so they move on to Scotland, hoping for assistance from Sophia’s relatives.

At an inn, the women encounter the elderly Lord St. Clair, who Laura senses is her grandfather. Lord St. Clair acknowledges both Laura and Sophia as his long-lost granddaughters from different daughters. Two young men also appear and are recognized as additional grandchildren. Lord St. Clair gives each grandchild money and leaves immediately.

Laura and Sophia again faint, and when they wake up, the male grandchildren are gone. They continue to the home of Sophia's cousin, Macdonald, where they try to break up his daughter Janetta's engagement because her intended lacks the qualities of a hero of sensibility; they convinced her to elope with Captain M'Kenzie instead, even though he seems to be merely a fortune-hunter.

Laura and Sophia decide to steal from Macdonald. When they are caught, they tell him about the elopement of his daughter, and he kicks them out of his house. After they walk some distance, they see a carriage accident, and the victims are Edward and Augustus. Edward briefly regains consciousness and dies. Sophia continually faints in horror, and dies from the cold that she contracted from the dew.

== Themes ==
Scholars have frequently pointed out Austen's critique of the novel of Sensibility. Juliet McMaster argues that Austen has the heroines dramatically faint and exhibit exaggerated emotional responses, highlighting the absurdity of the typical behavior of sentimental heroines. Scholars have disagreed over Austen's perspective in critiquing sensibility. Marilyn Butler, who sees Austen as an "Anti-Jacobin" conservative, argues that Austen is critiquing sensibility's emphasis on individualism that sees no limits to its reach, as Laura is "aware only of those others so similar in tastes and temperament that she can think of them only as extensions of herself." For Butler, Austen sees positive self-development as necessarily constrained by the customs and rules of society. By contrast, Peter Knox-Shaw argues that the novella's "satire belongs to a revolution that is liberal in character." Knox-Shaw maintains that Austen is not criticizing sensibility's emphasis on individualism and sympathy, but rather the excessive reliance of them. For Knox-Shaw, Austen is clearly writing her burlesque in the context of Enlightenment criticisms of an exclusive reliance on emotions, but not disavowing the importance of these emotions in a well-ordered, virtuous life.
