= The History of England (Austen) =

1791 historical parody by Jane Austen

The History of England is a 1791 work by Jane Austen, written when the author was fifteen.

== Overview ==
The work is a burlesque which pokes fun at widely used schoolroom history books such as Oliver Goldsmith's 1771 The History of England from the Earliest Times to the Death of George II. Austen mockingly imitates the style of textbook histories of English monarchs, while ridiculing historians' pretensions to objectivity. It was illustrated with coloured portraits by Austen's elder sister Cassandra, to whom the work is dedicated.

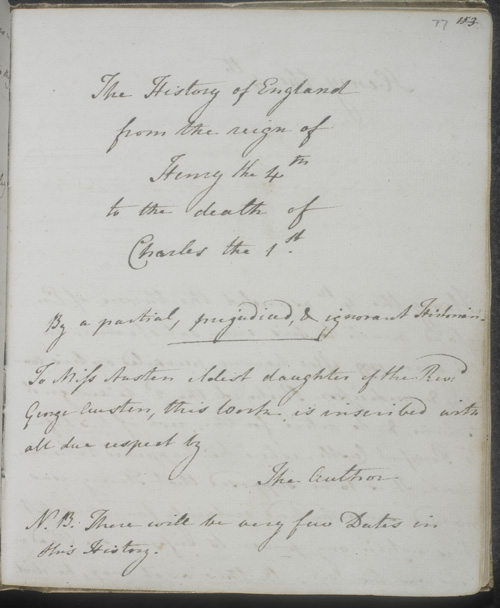
The History of England, page 2

The second page of the History reads:

The History of England
from the reign of
Henry the 4th
to the death of
Charles the 1st

By a partial, prejudiced, & ignorant Historian

To Miſs Austen, eldest daughter of the Rev^{d}
George Austen, this work is inscribed with
all due respect by
The Author

N.B. There will be very few Dates in
this History.

Her History cites as sources works of fiction such as the plays of Shakespeare and Sheridan, a novel by Charlotte Turner Smith and the opinions of Austen's family and friends. Along with accounts of English kings and queens which contain little factual information but a great deal of comically exaggerated opining about their characters and behaviour, the work includes material such as charades and puns on names.

While the work offers her family humorous vignettes on English rulers from Henry II to Charles I, many entries focus on royal women, such as Anne Boleyn, Lady Jane Grey, and Mary, Queen of Scots, who are denied entries but are significant figures in English history. Mary, Queen of Scots, in particular plays an important role in Austen's History, which also acts as a vindication of the executed cousin of Elizabeth I. Elizabeth I is treated as a tyrant, rather than a good leader, thus showing Austen's affinity for Mary and the Stuart monarchs.

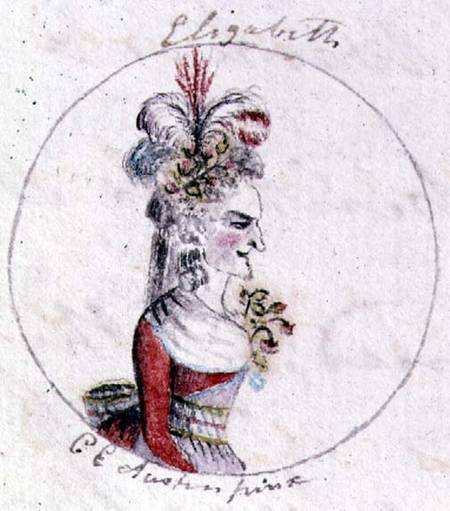
Elizabeth I by Cassandra Austen

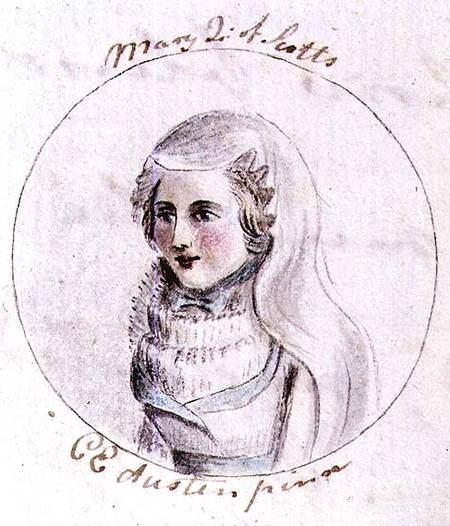
Mary, Queen of Scots by Cassandra Austen

== Publication history ==
Some years after writing The History of England, Austen compiled this work and 28 other of her early compositions by copying them into three notebooks which she called "Volume the First", "Volume the Second" and "Volume the Third". These three volumes comprehensively are considered Austen's juvenilia, and by some critics her "minor works". The History of England is in "Volume the Second" (as are Love and Freindship [sic] and four other works) occupying 34 manuscript pages. Cassandra's 13 illustrations were done after the copying was completed. "Volume the Second" passed to Cassandra at Austen's death in 1817, and on Cassandra's death in 1845 to Francis Austen, with whose descendants it remained until it was sold to the British Library in 1977.

None of Austen's youthful works were published in her lifetime. Francis Austen's granddaughter, the then-owner of "Volume the Second", in 1922 permitted Chatto & Windus to publish the entire notebook under the name Love and Friendship. The History was included in volume 6 of R. W. Chapman's Oxford University Press edition of Jane Austen's complete works and since then has been published in several new editions and imprints. A German edition was published for the first time in 2009 by Luxbooks.
