= Plan of a Novel, According to Hints from Various Quarters =

Short satirical work by Jane Austen

Plan of a Novel, According to Hints from Various Quarters is a short satirical work by Jane Austen, probably written in May 1816. It was published in complete form for the first time by R. W. Chapman in 1926, extracts having appeared in 1871. It has been said that "in the Plan and the correspondence from which it arose, we have the most important account of what Jane Austen understood to be her aims and capacities as a novelist".

== Background ==
In October 1815 Austen was approached via letter by the Rev. James Stanier Clarke, librarian to the Prince Regent. The Prince greatly admired Austen's novels, to the point of owning multiple copies so as to have a set in each of his residences. Learning that Austen was staying with her brother in London, negotiating the publication of Emma, Clarke invited Austen to visit and be shown around the library of the Prince's London home, Carlton House. During the visit, Clarke suggested that the Prince wished to be the dedicatee of Austen's next novel: as Clarke put it, because the Prince admired Austen's novels, she would be "at liberty to dedicate any future novel to him." Austen took the hint, dedicating Emma to the Prince when it was published in December 1815, although she privately disapproved of the Prince's lax morals and treatment of his wife.

The correspondence between Austen and Clarke continued beyond their meeting at Carlton House. He had ideas for her fiction, including a novel to be based on a clergyman with a foothold in urban life, as well as the provincial rural settings she had used so far for clerics in her novels. Another suggestion, made following the announcement of the engagement of Princess Charlotte of Wales and Prince Leopold of Saxe-Coburg-Saalfield, was an historical novel on the House of Coburg. Austen tactfully side-stepped these suggestions with disclaimers about her talents, quipping that she "could no more write a Romance than an Epic Poem."

== Content and humour of the Plan ==
The intention of the work was to set down the essential parts of the "ideal novel". Austen was following, and guying, the recommendations of Clarke. The work was also influenced by some of Austen's personal circle with views on the novel of courtship, and names are recorded in the margins of the manuscript; they included William Gifford, her publisher, and her niece Fanny Knight.

The Plan became a sort of family joke among the Austens. Some of its aspects parody contemporary works by authors such as Sophie Cottin, Fanny Burney, Anna Maria Porter, and Mary Brunton. The satire of the Plan was analysed by Austen's nephew James Edward Austen-Leigh, in his biography A Memoir of Jane Austen (1869, expanded edition 1871).
