= A Memoir of Jane Austen =

1869 biography of the novelist Jane Austen

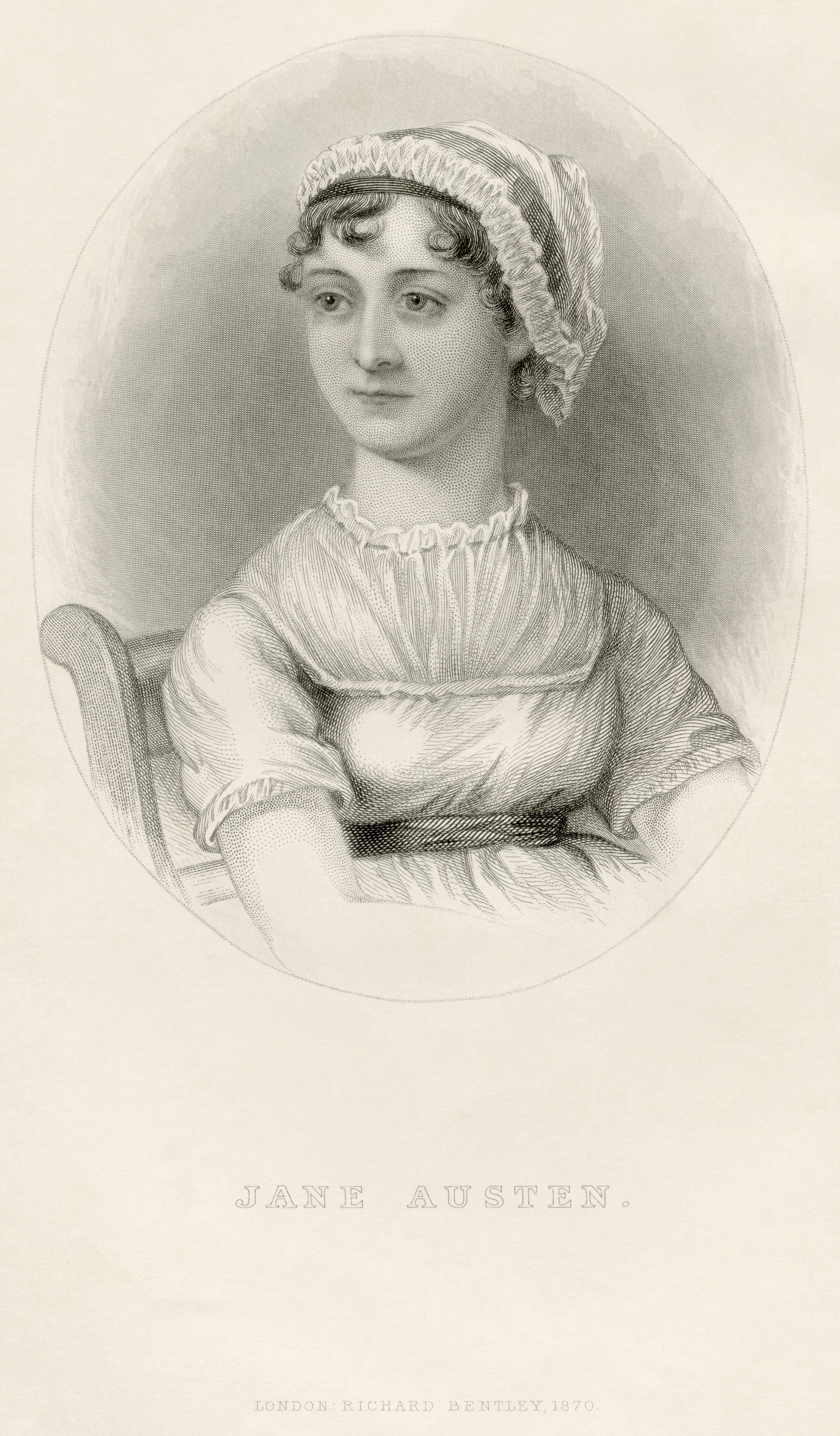
- Victorianized portrait of Jane Austen produced for the Memoir
- Author: James Edward Austen-Leigh
- Language: English
- Subject: Jane Austen
- Genre: Biography
- Published: 1869

A Memoir of Jane Austen is a biography of the novelist Jane Austen (1775–1817) published in 1869 by her nephew James Edward Austen-Leigh. A second edition was published in 1871 which included previously unpublished Jane Austen writings. A family project, the biography was written by James Edward Austen-Leigh but owed much to the recollections of Jane Austen's many relatives. However, it was the decisions of her sister, Cassandra Austen, to destroy many of Jane's letters after her death that shaped the material available for the biography.

Austen-Leigh described his "dear Aunt Jane" domestically, as someone who was uninterested in fame and who only wrote in her spare time. However, the manuscripts appended to the second edition suggest that Jane Austen was intensely interested in revising her manuscripts and was perhaps less content than Austen-Leigh described her. The Memoir does not attempt to unreservedly tell the story of Jane Austen's life. Following the Victorian conventions of biography, it kept much private information from the public, but family members disagreed over just how much should be revealed; for example, regarding Austen's romantic relationships.

The Memoir introduced the public to the works of Jane Austen, generating interest in novels which only the literary elite had read up until that point. It remained the primary biographical work on the author for over half a century.

== Composition ==
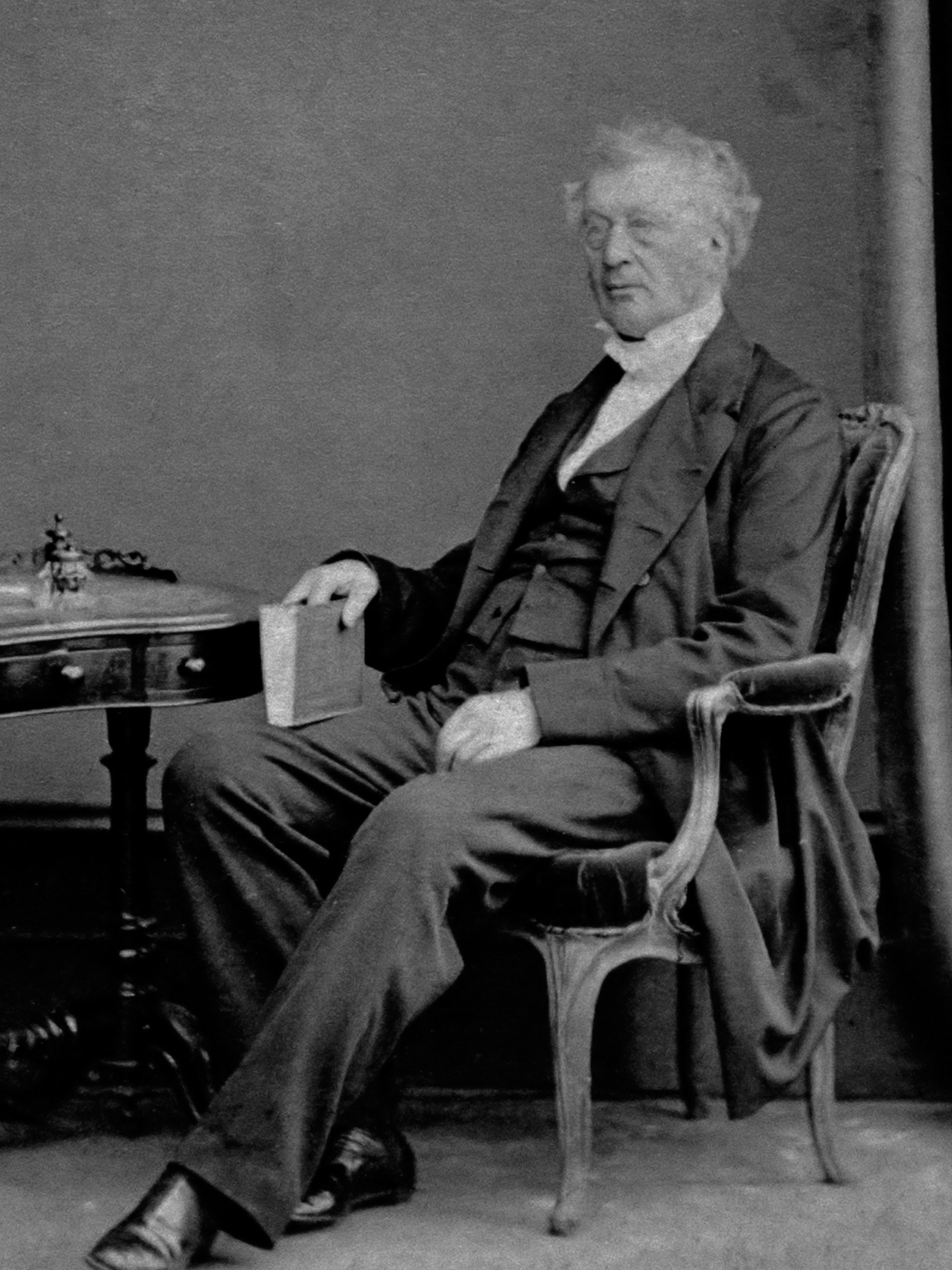
James Edward Austen-Leigh (1860s)

In the late 1860s, the Austen family decided to write a biography of Jane Austen. The death of Sir Francis Austen, her last surviving sibling, and the ageing of those who had any memory of her prompted the family to gather their papers and to begin recording their memories. Public interest in Jane Austen was also developing and the family became concerned that an outsider or another branch of the family would produce a biography. James Edward Austen-Leigh, as the son of the eldest branch, "in a spirit of censorship as well as communication", thus began the project. With the help and support of his sisters and Jane Austen's nieces, he collected materials. The biography was largely the work of James Edward Austen-Leigh, his half-sister Jane Anna Elizabeth Austen Lefroy, his younger sister Caroline Mary Craven Austen, and their cousin Cassy Esten. As Austen scholar Kathryn Sutherland points out in her "Introduction" to the Oxford edition of the Memoir, however, Austen-Leigh's biography is specific to the Steventon or Hampshire Austens, for whom Jane Austen is "nature-loving, religious, domestic, [and] middle class". The Godmersham or Kentish Austens viewed Jane Austen as more "inward and passionate...gentrified, improved willy-nilly by contact with her fine relations". Moreover, as Caroline wrote, "the generation who knew her is passing away". Much of the biography is based on the memories of those who had only known Jane Austen when they were children and she was their older aunt; the rest is based on written records passed down through the family.

As Sutherland explains, "the major ingredients of the Memoir, as well as its reverent colouring, are owed, in one way or another, to Cassandra Austen." Cassandra was the executor of Jane's will and was responsible for the preservation and destruction of all remaining letters and manuscripts after Jane's death. According to Caroline Austen, one of Jane Austen's nieces, Cassandra "looked [the letters] over and burnt the greater part, (as she told me), 2 or 3 years before her own death—She left, or gave some as legacies to the Nieces—but of those that I have seen, several had portions cut out". Thus, while writing the Memoir, Austen-Leigh did not have access to large numbers of Jane Austen's letters. Furthermore, the rest had been scattered as bequests; a complete collection of Jane Austen's extant letters was only gathered in 1932.

There may have been disagreements between the descendants regarding how much information to keep private, particularly with regards to Jane Austen's romances. For example, the first edition of the Memoir states "I have no reason to think that she ever felt any attachment by which the happiness of her life was at all affected". This sentence was removed from the second edition and two romantic attachments are hinted at, with the conclusion "I am unable to say whether her feelings were of such a nature as to affect her happiness". This kind of reticence was not isolated to the Austen family, however—it was typical of mid-Victorian era biography.

== Publication ==
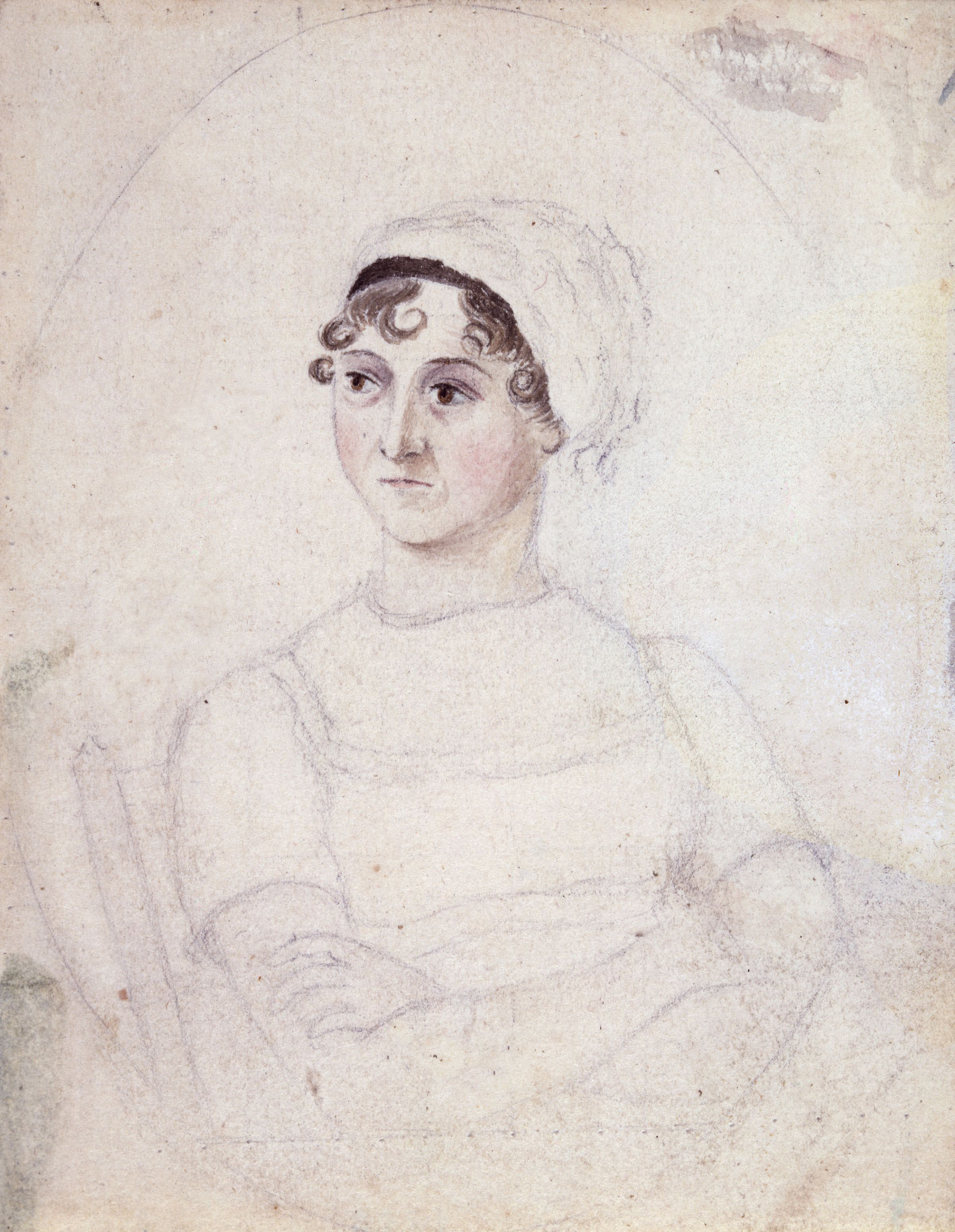
Original watercolor sketch by Cassandra Austen (c. 1810)

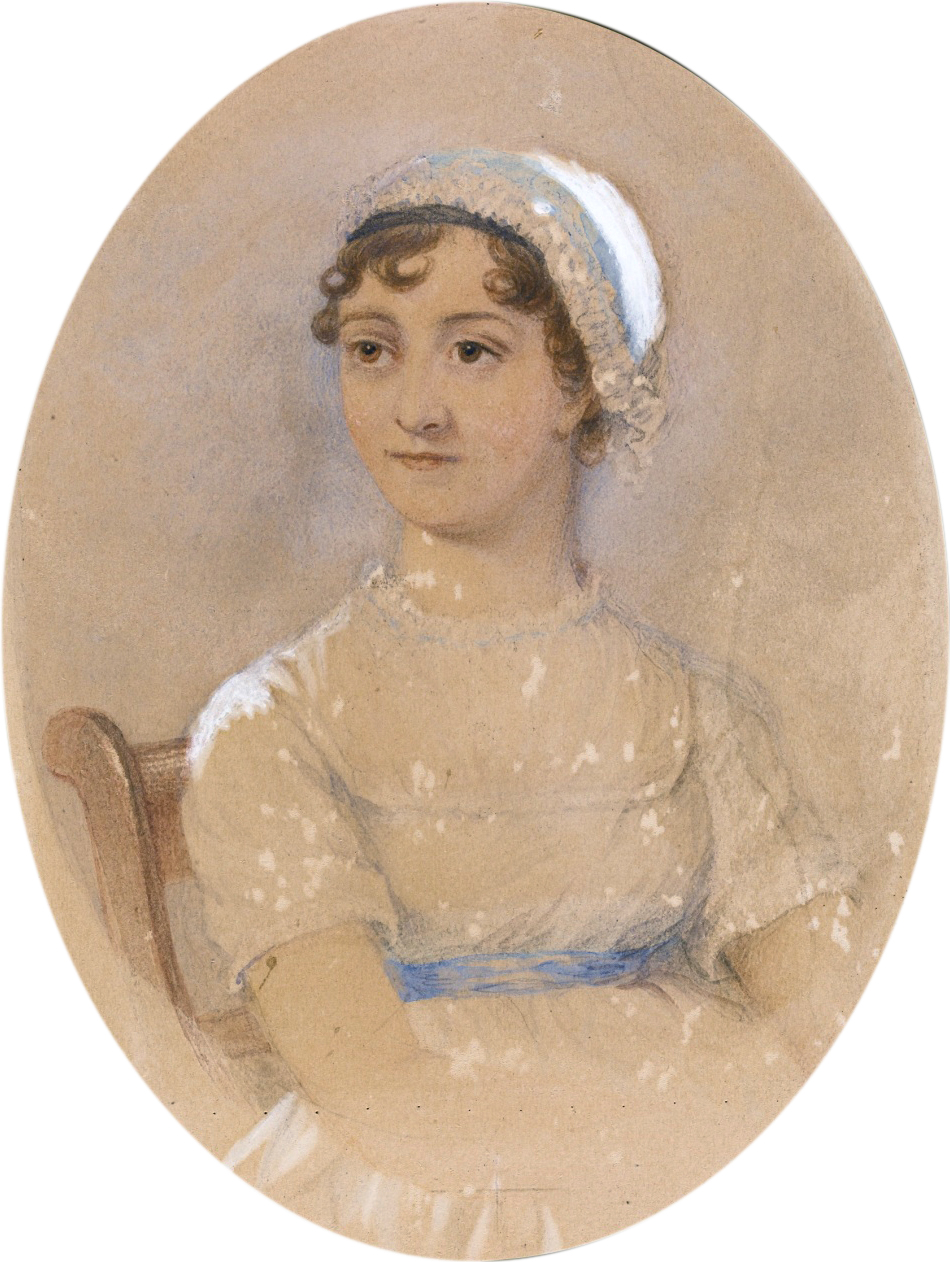
Cassandra's sketch was the basis for this watercolour, made by James Andrews. This watercolour served as the source for later engravings.

James Edward Austen-Leigh began writing the Memoir on 30 March 1869 and finished it five months later in September. It was published on 16 December 1869 (though dated 1870) in an edition of about 1,000 copies. In 1871, Austen-Leigh published a second edition, which contained additional letters, family papers, and biographical material. He also included fragments of unfinished and unpublished Jane Austen manuscripts, namely a chapter Austen deleted from Persuasion and extracts from Sanditon as well as Lady Susan and The Watsons.

Used as a frontispiece for the Memoir was a portrait of Jane Austen drawn by James Andrews of Maidenhead. Based on a "slight watercolour sketch" made by Cassandra around 1810, Andrews produced a professional portrait that served as a model for a steel engraving. As Sutherland notes, "its difference from Cassandra's original is evident to the most cursory glance. Her crude pencil and watercolour likeness is sharp-faced, pursed-lipped, unsmiling, scornful even, and withdrawn; in its Victorian refashioning, the face is softer, its expression more pliant, and the eyes only pensively averted." Andrews paid great attention to the details of Austen's dress and the chair. Cassy Esten, who owned the original sketch, wrote of the portrait: "I think the portrait is very much superior to any thing that could have been expected from the sketch it was taken from.—It is a very pleasing, sweet face,—tho’, I confess, to not thinking it much like the original;—but that, the public will not be able to detect."

== Description ==
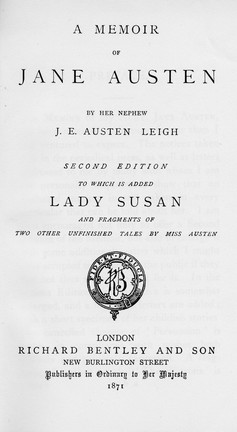
Title page from the second edition of the Memoir (1871)

The Memoir is a "rag-bag, not the shaped life of the historio- or psycho-biographies of the late twentieth century, but an undesigned and unprioritized assortment" of detail, such as descriptions of clothing, a "eulogy of spinning", and a digression on the Welsh ancestry of some Austen relations. Nor does the biography aim to tell the unvarnished truth. For example, the family hid the existence of a second brother, the handicapped George Austen, and described Edward Austen as the second brother instead of the third. They also omitted the arrest and jailing of Mrs. Leigh Perrot, Jane Austen's aunt, for shoplifting in Bath. According to 19th-century biography standards, "neither piece of discretion is surprising".

Jane Austen herself is described as "a comfortable figure, shunning fame and professional status, centred in home, writing only in the intervals permitted from the important domestic duties of a devoted daughter, sister, and aunt". However, the manuscripts published alongside the biography suggest another portrait, one of a struggling author who endlessly revised and of a "restless and sardonic spirit".

== Reception and legacy ==
The book had an "immediate" and "incalculable" effect on the public's perception of Jane Austen. It generated interest in the works of an author which, for half a century, had been read almost entirely by the literary elite, and Austen's popularity increased dramatically. The publication of the Memoir also spurred the reissue of Austen's novels. The first popular editions were released in 1883—a sixpenny series by Routledge. This was followed by fancy illustrated editions, collectors' sets, and scholarly editions.

In 1926, a version was published that is based on the 1871 edition, and has an introduction, notes and index by R W Chapman.

The image of "dear aunt Jane" presented in the biography was not seriously challenged until 1940, when psychologist D. W. Harding argued that there was a "regulated hatred" in Austen's works. With the exception of Harding's 1965 edition, there has been "no serious editorial engagement with the Memoir and little critical attention paid to it. However, as Sutherland writes, "James Austen-Leigh...assembled a major work of Austenian biography" which has been called the "prime source of all subsequent biographical writings".

== See also ==
- Reception history of Jane Austen
- Jane Austen family tree
- Jane Austen nephew and nieces family tree

== Bibliography ==
- Austen Leigh, James Edward. A Memoir of Jane Austen; R. Bentley, 1870 (reissued by Cambridge University Press, 2009; ISBN 978-1-108-00356-8)
- Austen Leigh, James Edward. A Memoir of Jane Austen. Together with 'Lady Susan': a Novel, etc. Bentley, 1871 (reissued by Cambridge University Press, 2009; ISBN 978-1-108-00357-5)
- Southam, B. C., ed. Jane Austen: The Critical Heritage, 1870–1940. Vol. 2. London: Routledge and Kegan Paul, 1987. ISBN 0-7102-0189-3.
- Sutherland, Kathryn. "Introduction". A Memoir of Jane Austen and other Family Recollections. Oxford: Oxford University Press, 2002. ISBN 0-19-284074-6.
