= Catharine, or The Bower =

Catharine, or the Bower (Kitty, or the Bower) is an unfinished novel from Jane Austen's juvenilia. With its realistic setting and characters, it represents something of a bridge between her early burlesques and the soberer novels that made her name.

== Date ==
Appearing in Volume the Third of Austen's early writing (begun in 1792), Catharine is itself generally dated to 1792–3. However, a (substituted) reference to the Regency has been seen as linking it to the first regency crisis of 1788–9, rather than being a later interpolation; while alternatively, because of thematic parallels in Austen's letters of 1795–6, The Bower has also been post-dated to the mid-nineties instead.

== Plot summary ==
Catharine (Kitty) Percival (the name is sometimes given as Peterson) is an orphan, ward of her aunt, Mrs. Percival, who is strict with her. Kitty has lost her dear friends, Cecilia and Mary Wynne, whose clergyman father's death scattered the family; Cecilia Wynne was sent to India to be married to a much older man she dislikes, and Mary is serving as a companion in the household of a distant relative, Lady Halifax, dependent on that family for even the clothes on her back. Together Kitty, Cecilia, and Mary had planted a bower in Mrs. Percival’s garden, which, now grown to maturity, is Kitty’s haven and chief comfort.

Mrs. Percival goes to great lengths to prevent Kitty from meeting possibly unsuitable young men. Kitty is allowed to socialize only with Mr. and Mrs. Dudley and their daughter, an arrogant and quarrelsome family. Mrs. Percival even refuses visits from the Stanleys, relatives of Mrs. Percival and Catharine, who are a wealthy family with political and social influence, because they have a son, Edward, of marriageable age.

However, Edward has now moved to France, and the Stanleys come to visit. Kitty excitedly anticipates their arrival. She is disappointed to find that their daughter, Camilla, has little in common with her. While Camilla's "ideas where towards the Eleagance of the appearance", she seemed to be "devoid of taste or judgment" (p. 169). Camilla "professed a love of books without reading, was lively without wit, and generally good humoured without merit" (p. 169). Kitty wants to discuss things like books and politics, but Camilla leads the conversation back to subjects Kitty views as frivolous, such as fashion and social life. Camilla is acquainted with the Halifaxes, and she and Kitty disagree over the Halifaxes and the Wynne sisters. Camilla thinks that the sisters are fortunate, while Kitty views their situation as tragic and thinks that the Wynnes have been ill-treated by their benefactors.

Kitty concludes that she and Camilla will not come to an agreement, and escapes to her bower. Camilla later comes to the bower, excited, to tell Kitty that they have all been invited to the Dudleys’ ball the next evening. In the morning, Kitty wakes up with a violent toothache that prevents her from attending the ball. Camilla, her parents, and Mrs. Percival decide to attend the ball without her.

Mrs. Stanley and Mrs. Percival discuss the friendship between Camilla and Kitty. Mrs. Percival see their relationship as detrimental and tells Mrs. Stanley that she, herself, did not have such a companion. Mrs. Percival quips that perhaps it would have changed her for the better, and talks about the friend of her own girlhood, with whom she still keeps acquaintance.

Edward Stanley turns up at the Percivals’ home, having returned to England unexpectedly, and convinces Kitty to go with him to the ball after all. Mrs. Percival is not pleased. In the following days, Edward flirts with Kitty, and it becomes apparent that he has much more in common with her than Camilla does. He makes a point of kissing her hand when Mrs. Percival is approaching and can witness it. Kitty begins to fall in love with Edward. Her aunt doesn't approve of him and chastises Kitty for scandalous behavior.

Mr. Stanley is also displeased by Edward’s flirting with Kitty, and sends him back to the Continent. Kitty is hurt by his abrupt departure, but Camilla tells her that he was sorry to leave, obviously because he is in love with Kitty. Kitty is in a "state of satisfaction."

The book was never completed, so we do not know where the story would have gone next.

== Themes ==
Featuring an orphan heroine raised by a censorious aunt, The Bower also includes elements of farce, parody and burlesque (as did earlier juvenalia). Sentimentalism featured strongly, with Catharine's bower, constructed with the help of her two absent friends, featuring as the only place able “to restore her to herself”: it would eventually be destroyed by her aunt in an apparent parody of The Faerie Queene.

Two new characters, a brother-sister pairing, do much to set in motion the (unfinished) plot. Camilla Stanley (a forerunner of Northanger Abbey's Isabella Thorpe) bonds with Catharine over sentimental novels; while their friendship also opens a conduct book debate over female correspondence: Isabella's mother maintains that “Nothing forms the taste more than sensible & Elegant letters”, while Catharine's aunt objects to “a correspondence between Girls as...the frequent origin of imprudence & Error”.

Romance enters The Bower with Edward Stanley, whose presentation anticipates Henry Crawford or Mr Willoughby; his eventual role as villain or as hero remains undefined.

== See also ==
- Charlotte Smith
- Fishing fleet
- The Castle of Indolence
