= Jane Austen =

English novelist (1775–1817)

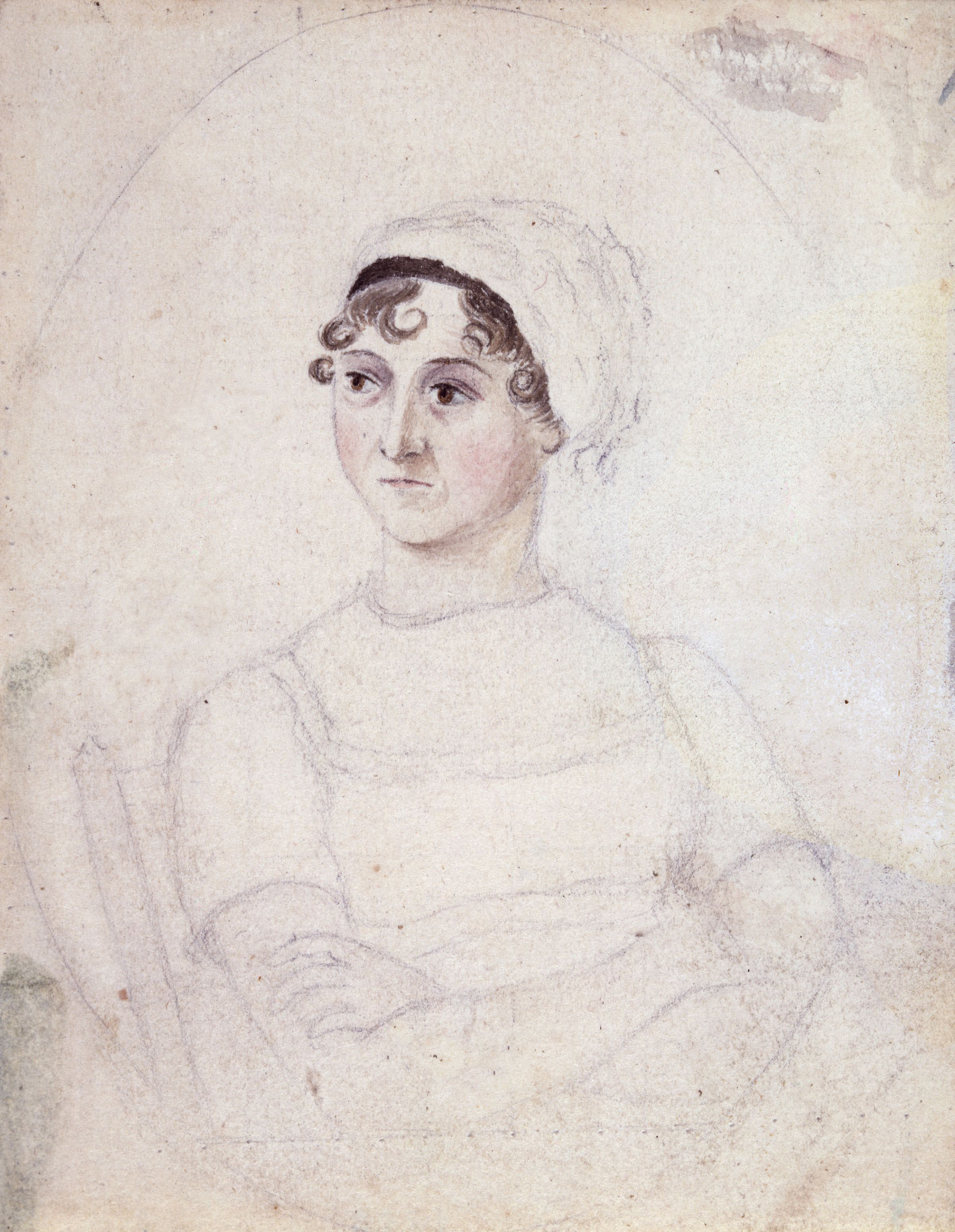
- Portrait, c. 1810 (Note: The original is unsigned but was believed by the family to have been made by Austen's sister Cassandra and remained in the family until 1920 with a signed sketch by Cassandra. The original sketch, according to relatives who knew Jane Austen well, was not a good likeness.)
- Born: 16 December 1775; Steventon, Hampshire, England
- Died: 18 July 1817 (aged 41); Winchester, Hampshire, England
- Resting place: Winchester Cathedral, Hampshire
- Education: Reading Abbey Girls' School (1785–1786)
- Occupation: Novelist
- Relatives: Family and ancestry
- Writing career
- Years active: 1787–1817
- Period: Georgian (Regency era)
- Genres: Literary realism; Romantic fiction; Satire
- Notable works: Sense and Sensibility; Pride and Prejudice; Mansfield Park; Emma; Northanger Abbey; Persuasion
- Works related to Jane Austen at Wikisource

Jane Austen (/ˈɒstɪn, ˈɔːstɪn/ OST-in, AW-stin; 16 December 1775 – 18 July 1817) was an English writer known primarily for her six novels, which implicitly interpret, critique, and comment on the English landed gentry at the end of the 18th century.

Austen's plots often explore the dependence of women on marriage for the pursuit of favourable social standing and economic security. Her works are implicit critiques of the novels of sensibility of the second half of the 18th century and are part of the transition to 19th-century literary realism. (Note: Oliver MacDonagh says that Sense and Sensibility "may well be the first English realistic novel" based on its detailed and accurate portrayal of what he calls "getting and spending" in an English gentry family.) Her use of social commentary, realism, wit, and irony have earned her acclaim amongst critics and scholars.

Austen wrote major novels before the age of 22, but she was not published until she was 35. The anonymously published Sense and Sensibility (1811), Pride and Prejudice (1813), Mansfield Park (1814), and Emma (1815) were moderate successes, but they did not bring her public fame in her lifetime. She wrote two other novels—Northanger Abbey and Persuasion, both published posthumously in 1817—and began another, eventually titled Sanditon, but it was left unfinished on her death. She also left behind three volumes of juvenile writings in manuscript, the short epistolary novel Lady Susan, and the unfinished novel The Watsons.

Since her death Austen's novels have rarely been out of print. A significant transition in her reputation occurred in 1833, when they were republished in Richard Bentley's Standard Novels series (illustrated by Ferdinand Pickering and sold as a set). They gradually gained wide acclaim and popular readership. In 1869, her nephew published A Memoir of Jane Austen. Her work has inspired a large number of critical essays and has been included in many literary anthologies.

Her novels have been frequently adapted into film and television. Notable film adaptations include Pride and Prejudice (1940), Sense and Sensibility (1995), Emma (1996), Mansfield Park (1999), Bride and Prejudice (2004), Pride & Prejudice (2005), Love & Friendship (2016), and Emma (2020). Notable television adaptations include Persuasion (1995), Pride and Prejudice (1995), Northanger Abbey (2007), Persuasion (2007), Lost in Austen (2008), Sense and Sensibility (2008), Emma (2009), and Sanditon (2019–2023).

== Biographical sources ==
Last page of a letter from Austen to her sister, Cassandra, dated 11 June 1799

The scant biographical information about Austen comes from her surviving letters and a number of sketches her family members and contemporaries wrote about her.

Only about 160 of the approximately 3,000 letters Austen may have written in the course of her lifetime have survived and been published. It is believed that Cassandra Austen destroyed the bulk of the letters she received from her sister. One theory is that she wanted to ensure that the "younger nieces did not read any of Jane's sometimes acid or forthright comments on neighbours or family members." In the interest of protecting reputations from Jane's penchant for honesty and forthrightness, Cassandra, it is surmised, may have omitted details of illnesses, unhappiness and anything she considered unsavoury. It is certainly the case that important details about her life and the actions of the Austen family were deliberately omitted, such as any mention of Austen's brother George, whose undiagnosed developmental challenges led the family to have him raised away from their home, as was common for the time, or of wealthy Aunt Jane Leigh-Perrot, who was arrested, tried, and acquitted on charges of grand larceny.

The first Austen biography was her brother Henry Thomas Austen's 1818 "Biographical Notice". It appeared in a posthumous edition of Northanger Abbey and included extracts from two letters, apparently published against the judgement of other family members. Details of Austen's life continued to be omitted or embellished in her nephew's A Memoir of Jane Austen, published in 1869, and in William and Richard Arthur Austen-Leigh's biography Jane Austen: Her Life and Letters, published in 1913, both of which included additional letters.

Austen's family and relatives built a legend of "good quiet Aunt Jane", portraying her as a woman in a happy domestic situation, whose family was the mainstay of her life. Critics have long taken issue with this depiction of a "mild" Austen. Modern biographers include details excised from the letters and family biographies, but the biographer Jan Fergus writes that the challenge is to keep the view balanced, not to present her languishing in periods of deep unhappiness as "an embittered, disappointed woman trapped in a thoroughly unpleasant family."

== Early years to age 20 ==
=== Family ===
Jane Austen was born on 16 December 1775 in Steventon, Hampshire. Her father, George Austen (1731–1805), wrote of her arrival in a letter that her mother, Cassandra, "certainly expected to have been brought to bed a month ago." He added that the newborn infant was "a present plaything for Cassy and a future companion." The winter of 1775-1776 was particularly harsh, and it was not until 5 April that she was baptised at the local church and christened Jane.

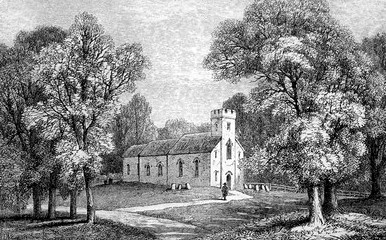
Church of St Nicholas in Steventon, as depicted in A Memoir of Jane Austen

George served as the rector of the Anglican parishes of Steventon and Deane. (Note: Irene Collins estimates that when George Austen took up his duties as rector in 1764, Steventon comprised no more than about thirty families.) The Reverend Austen came from an old and wealthy family of wool merchants. As each generation of eldest sons received inheritances, George's branch of the family fell into poverty. He and his two sisters were orphaned as children and had to be taken in by relatives. In 1745, at the age of fifteen, George's sister Philadelphia was apprenticed to a milliner in Covent Garden. At the age of sixteen, George entered St John's College, Oxford, where he most likely met Cassandra Leigh (1739–1827). She came from the prominent Leigh family. Her father was rector at All Souls College, Oxford, where she grew up among the gentry. Her eldest brother James inherited a fortune and large estate from his great-aunt Perrot, with the only condition that he change his name to Leigh-Perrot.

George Austen and Cassandra Leigh were engaged, probably around 1763, when they exchanged miniatures. He received the living of the Steventon parish from Thomas Knight, the wealthy husband of his second cousin. They married on 26 April 1764 at St Swithin's Church in Bath, by licence, in a simple ceremony, two months after Cassandra's father died. Their income was modest, with George's small per annum living; Cassandra brought to the marriage the expectation of a small inheritance at the time of her mother's death.

After the living at the nearby Deane rectory had been purchased for George by his wealthy uncle Francis Austen, the Austens took up temporary residence there, until Steventon rectory, a 16th-century house in disrepair, underwent necessary renovations. Cassandra gave birth to three children while living at Deane: James in 1765, George in 1766, and Edward in 1767. Her custom was to keep an infant at home for several months and then place it with Elizabeth Littlewood, a woman living nearby to nurse and raise for twelve to eighteen months.

=== Steventon ===
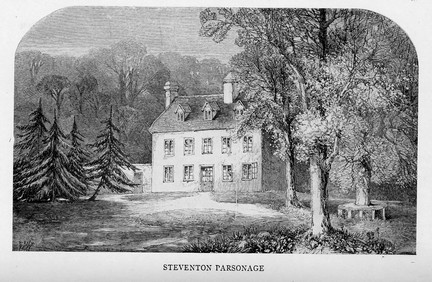
Steventon parsonage, as depicted in A Memoir of Jane Austen, was in a valley and surrounded by meadows.

In 1768 the family finally took up residence in Steventon. Henry was the first child to be born there, in 1771. At about this time, Cassandra could no longer ignore the signs that little George was developmentally disabled. He had seizures and may have been deaf and mute. At this time she chose to send him to be fostered. In 1773 Cassandra was born, followed by Francis in 1774, and Jane in 1775.

According to the biographer Park Honan, the Austen home had an "open, amused, easy intellectual atmosphere", in which the ideas of those with whom members of the Austen family might disagree politically or socially were considered and discussed.

The family relied on the patronage of their kin and hosted visits from numerous family members. The elder Cassandra spent the summer of 1770 in London with George's sister, Philadelphia, and her daughter Eliza, accompanied by his other sister, Mrs Walter, and her daughter Philly. (Note: Philadelphia had returned from India in 1765 and taken up residence in London; when her husband returned to India to replenish their income, she stayed in England. He died in India in 1775, with Philadelphia unaware until the news reached her a year later, fortuitously as George and Cassandra were visiting. See Le Faye, 29–36) Philadelphia and Eliza Hancock were, according to Le Faye, "the bright comets flashing into an otherwise placid solar system of clerical life in rural Hampshire, and the news of their foreign travels and fashionable London life, together with their sudden descents upon the Steventon household in between times, all helped to widen Jane's youthful horizon and influence her later life and works."

Cassandra Austen's cousin Thomas Leigh visited a number of times in the 1770s and 1780s, inviting young Cassie to visit them in Bath in 1781. The first mention of Jane occurs in family documents upon her return, "... and almost home they were when they met Jane & Charles, the two little ones of the family, who had to go as far as New Down to meet the chaise, & have the pleasure of riding home in it." Le Faye writes that "Mr Austen's predictions for his younger daughter were fully justified. Never were sisters more to each other than Cassandra and Jane; while in a particularly affectionate family, there seems to have been a special link between Cassandra and Edward on the one hand, and between Henry and Jane on the other."

From 1773 until 1796 George supplemented his income by farming and by teaching three or four boys at a time, who boarded at his home. He had an annual income of £200 (equivalent to £26,000 in 2025) from his two livings. This was a very modest income at the time; by comparison, a skilled worker like a blacksmith or a carpenter could make about £100 annually while the typical annual income of a gentry family was between £1,000 and £5,000. He also rented the 200-acre Cheesedown farm from his benefactor Thomas Knight, which could make a profit of £300 (equivalent to £40,000 in 2025) a year.

During this period of her life, Jane attended church regularly, socialised with friends and neighbours, (Note: For social conventions among the gentry generally, see Collins (1994), 105) and read novels—often of her own composition—aloud to her family in the evenings. Socialising with the neighbours often meant dancing, either impromptu in someone's home after supper or at the balls held regularly at the assembly rooms in the town hall. Her brother Henry later said that "Jane was fond of dancing, and excelled in it".

=== Education ===
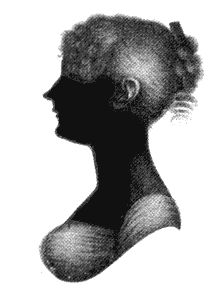
Silhouette of Cassandra Austen, Jane's sister and closest friend

In 1783 Austen and her sister Cassandra were sent to Oxford to be educated by Ann Cawley, who took them to Southampton later that year. That autumn both girls were sent home after catching typhus, of which Jane nearly died. She was from then home-educated, until she attended boarding school with her sister from early in 1785 at the Reading Abbey Girls' School, ruled by Mrs La Tournelle. The curriculum probably included French, spelling, needlework, dancing, music and drama. The sisters returned home before December 1786 because the school fees for the two girls were too high for the Austen family. After 1786 Austen "never again lived anywhere beyond the bounds of her immediate family environment".

Her education came from reading, guided by her father and brothers James and Henry. Irene Collins said that Austen "used some of the same school books as the boys". Austen apparently had unfettered access both to her father's library and that of a family friend, Warren Hastings. Together these collections amounted to a large and varied library. Her father was also tolerant of Austen's sometimes risqué experiments in writing, and provided both sisters with expensive paper and other materials for their writing and drawing.

Private theatricals were an essential part of Austen's education. From her early childhood, the family and friends staged a series of plays in the rectory barn, including Richard Sheridan's The Rivals (1775) and David Garrick's Bon Ton. Austen's eldest brother James wrote the prologues and epilogues and she probably joined in these activities, first as a spectator and later as a participant. Most of the plays were comedies, which suggests how Austen's satirical gifts were cultivated. At the age of 12 she tried her own hand at dramatic writing; she wrote three short plays during her teenage years.

=== Juvenilia (1787–1793) ===
From at least the time she was aged eleven, Austen wrote poems and stories to amuse herself and her family. She exaggerated mundane details of daily life and parodied common plot devices in "stories [] full of anarchic fantasies of female power, licence, illicit behaviour, and general high spirits", according to Janet Todd. Austen compiled fair copies of twenty-nine early works from 1787 to 1793 into three bound notebooks with 90,000 words, now known as the Juvenilia, named "Volume the First", "Volume the Second" and "Volume the Third". The Juvenilia are often, according to the scholar Richard Jenkyns, "boisterous" and "anarchic"; he compares them to the work of the 18th-century novelist Laurence Sterne.

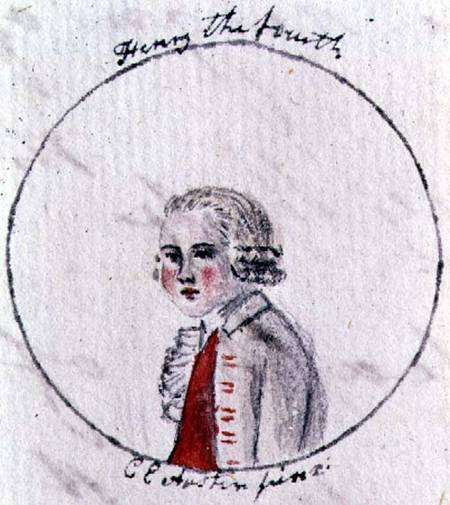
Austen's The History of England (1791) includes this portrait of Henry IV by her sister, Cassandra.

Among these works is a satirical novel in letters titled Love and Freindship [sic], written when aged fourteen in 1790, in which she mocked popular novels of sensibility. The next year, she wrote The History of England, a manuscript of thirty-four pages accompanied by thirteen watercolour miniatures by her sister, Cassandra. Austen's History parodied popular historical writing, particularly Oliver Goldsmith's History of England (1764). Honan speculates that not long after writing Love and Freindship Austen decided to "write for profit, to make stories her central effort", that is, to become a professional writer. When she was around eighteen years old, Austen began to write longer, more sophisticated works.

In August 1792, aged seventeen, Austen started Catharine or the Bower, which presaged her mature work, especially Northanger Abbey, but was left unfinished until picked up in Lady Susan, which Todd describes as less prefiguring than Catharine. A year later she began, but abandoned, a short play, later titled Sir Charles Grandison or the happy Man, a comedy in 6 acts, which she returned to and completed around 1800. This was a short parody of various school textbook abridgements of Austen's favourite contemporary novel, The History of Sir Charles Grandison (1753) by Samuel Richardson.

When Austen became an aunt for the first time aged eighteen, she sent her newborn niece Fanny Catherine Austen Knight "five short pieces of ... the Juvenilia now known collectively as 'Scraps' .., purporting to be her 'Opinions and Admonitions on the conduct of Young Women'". For Jane-Anna-Elizabeth Austen (also born in 1793), her aunt wrote "two more 'Miscellanious Morsels', dedicating them to [Anna] on 2 June 1793, 'convinced that if you seriously attend to them, You will derive from them very important Instructions, with regard to your Conduct in Life.'" There is manuscript evidence that Austen continued to work on these pieces as late as 1811 (when she was 36), and that her niece and nephew Anna and James Edward Austen made further additions as late as 1814.

External videos
- Presentation by Claire Tomalin on Jane Austen: A Life, 23 November 1997, C-SPAN

Between 1793 and 1795 (aged eighteen to twenty), Austen wrote Lady Susan, a short epistolary novel, usually described as her most ambitious and sophisticated early work. It is unlike any of Austen's other works. Austen's biographer Claire Tomalin describes the novella's heroine as a sexual predator who uses her intelligence and charm to manipulate, betray and abuse her lovers, friends and family. Tomalin writes:

Told in letters, it is as neatly plotted as a play, and as cynical in tone as any of the most outrageous of the Restoration dramatists who may have provided some of her inspiration ... It stands alone in Austen's work as a study of an adult woman whose intelligence and force of character are greater than those of anyone she encounters.

According to Janet Todd, the model for the title character may have been Eliza de Feuillide, who inspired Austen with stories of her glamorous life and various adventures. Eliza's French husband was guillotined in 1794 during the Reign of Terror amidst the French Revolution; she married Jane's brother Henry Austen in 1797.

== Ages 20 to 34 ==
=== Tom Lefroy ===
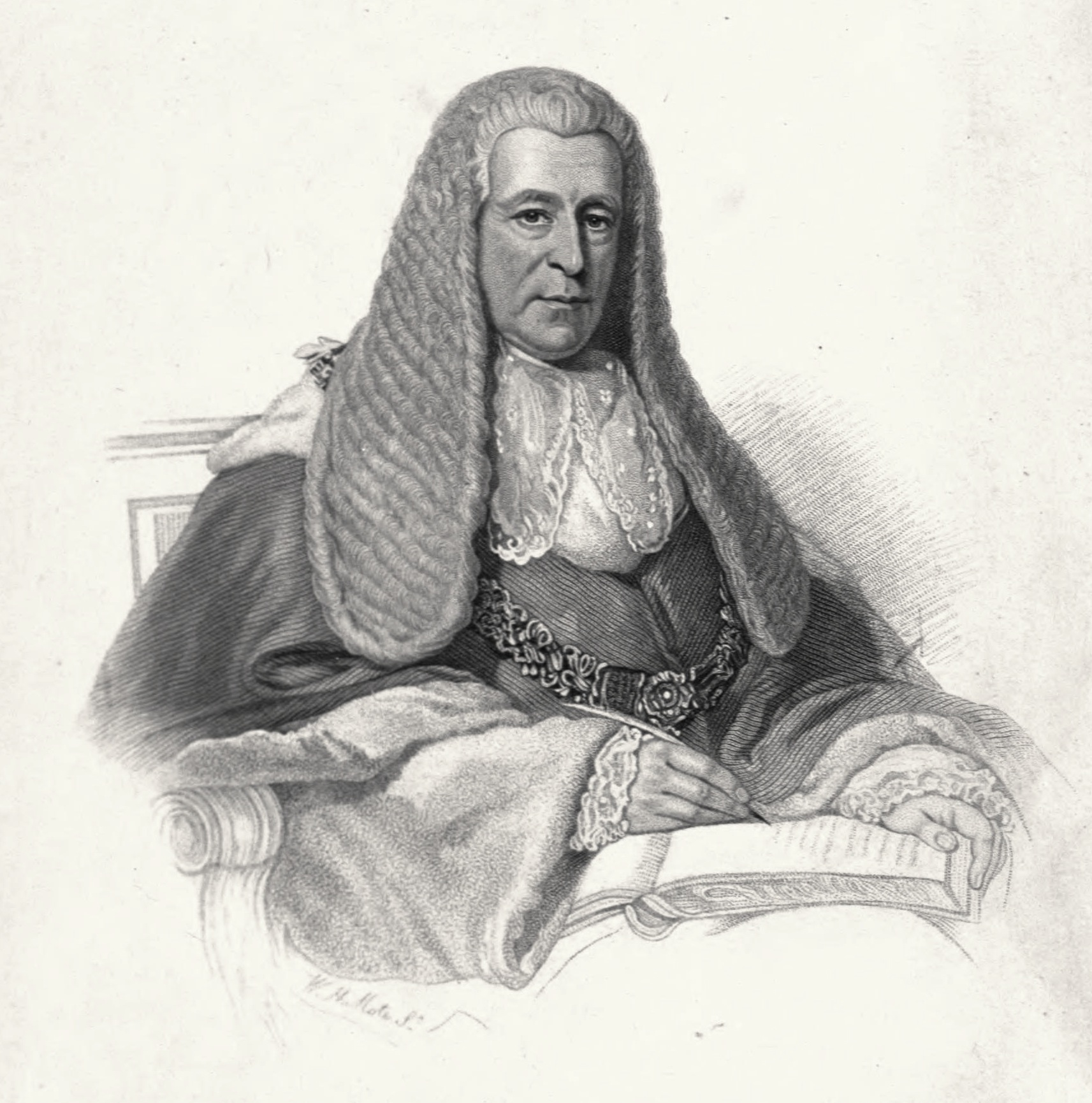
Thomas Langlois Lefroy, Lord Chief Justice of Ireland, by W. H. Mote (1855); in old age, Lefroy admitted that he had been in love with Austen: "It was boyish love."

When Austen was twenty, Tom Lefroy, a neighbour, visited Steventon from December 1795 to January 1796. He had just finished a university degree and was moving to London for training as a barrister. Lefroy and Austen would have been introduced at a ball or other neighbourhood social gathering, and it is clear from Austen's letters to Cassandra that they spent considerable time together: "I am almost afraid to tell you how my Irish friend and I behaved. Imagine to yourself everything most profligate and shocking in the way of dancing and sitting down together."

Austen wrote in her first surviving letter to her sister Cassandra that Lefroy was a "very gentlemanlike, good-looking, pleasant young man". Five days later in another letter, Austen wrote that she expected an "offer" from her "friend" and that "I shall refuse him, however, unless he promises to give away his white coat", going on to write "I will confide myself in the future to Mr Tom Lefroy, for whom I don't give a sixpence" and refuse all others. The next day, Austen wrote: "The day will come on which I flirt my last with Tom Lefroy and when you receive this it will be all over. My tears flow as I write at this melancholy idea".

Halperin cautioned that Austen often satirised popular sentimental romantic fiction in her letters, and some of the statements about Lefroy may have been ironic. However, it is clear that Austen was genuinely attracted to Lefroy and subsequently none of her other suitors ever quite measured up to him. The Lefroy family intervened and sent him away at the end of January. Marriage was impractical as both Lefroy and Austen must have known. Neither had any money, and he was dependent on a great-uncle in Ireland to finance his education and establish his legal career. If Lefroy later visited Hampshire, he was carefully kept away from the Austens, and Jane never saw him again. In November 1798 Lefroy was still on Austen's mind as she wrote to her sister she had tea with one of his relatives, wanted desperately to ask about him, but could not bring herself to raise the subject.

=== Early manuscripts (1796–1798) ===
After finishing Lady Susan, Austen began her first full-length novel Elinor and Marianne. Her sister remembered that it was read to the family "before 1796" and was told through a series of letters. Without surviving original manuscripts, there is no way to know how much of the original draft survived in the novel published anonymously in 1811 as Sense and Sensibility.

In 1796, Austen began a second novel, First Impressions (later published as Pride and Prejudice). She completed the initial draft in August 1797, aged 21; as with all of her novels, Austen read the work aloud to her family as she was working on it and it became an "established favourite". At this time, her father made the first attempt to publish one of her novels; in November 1797 he wrote to Thomas Cadell, an established publisher in London, to ask if he would consider publishing First Impressions. Cadell returned George's letter, marking it "Declined by Return of Post". Jane may not have known of her father's efforts. Following the completion of First Impressions, Austen returned to Elinor and Marianne and from November 1797 until mid-1798, revised it heavily; she eliminated the epistolary format in favour of third-person narration and produced something close to Sense and Sensibility.

In 1797 Austen met her cousin (and future sister-in-law) Eliza de Feuillide, a French aristocrat whose first husband the Comte de Feuillide had been guillotined, causing her to flee to Britain, where she married Henry Austen. The description of the execution of the Comte de Feuillide related by his widow left Austen with an intense horror of the French Revolution that lasted for the rest of her life.

During the middle of 1798, after finishing revisions of Elinor and Marianne, Austen began writing a third novel with the working title Susan—later Northanger Abbey—a satire on the popular Gothic novel. Austen completed her work about a year later. In early 1803, Henry Austen offered Susan to Benjamin Crosby, a London publisher, who paid £10 for the copyright. Crosby promised early publication and went so far as to advertise the book publicly as being "in the press", but did nothing more. The manuscript remained in Crosby's hands, unpublished, until Austen repurchased the copyright from him in 1816.

=== Bath and Southampton ===
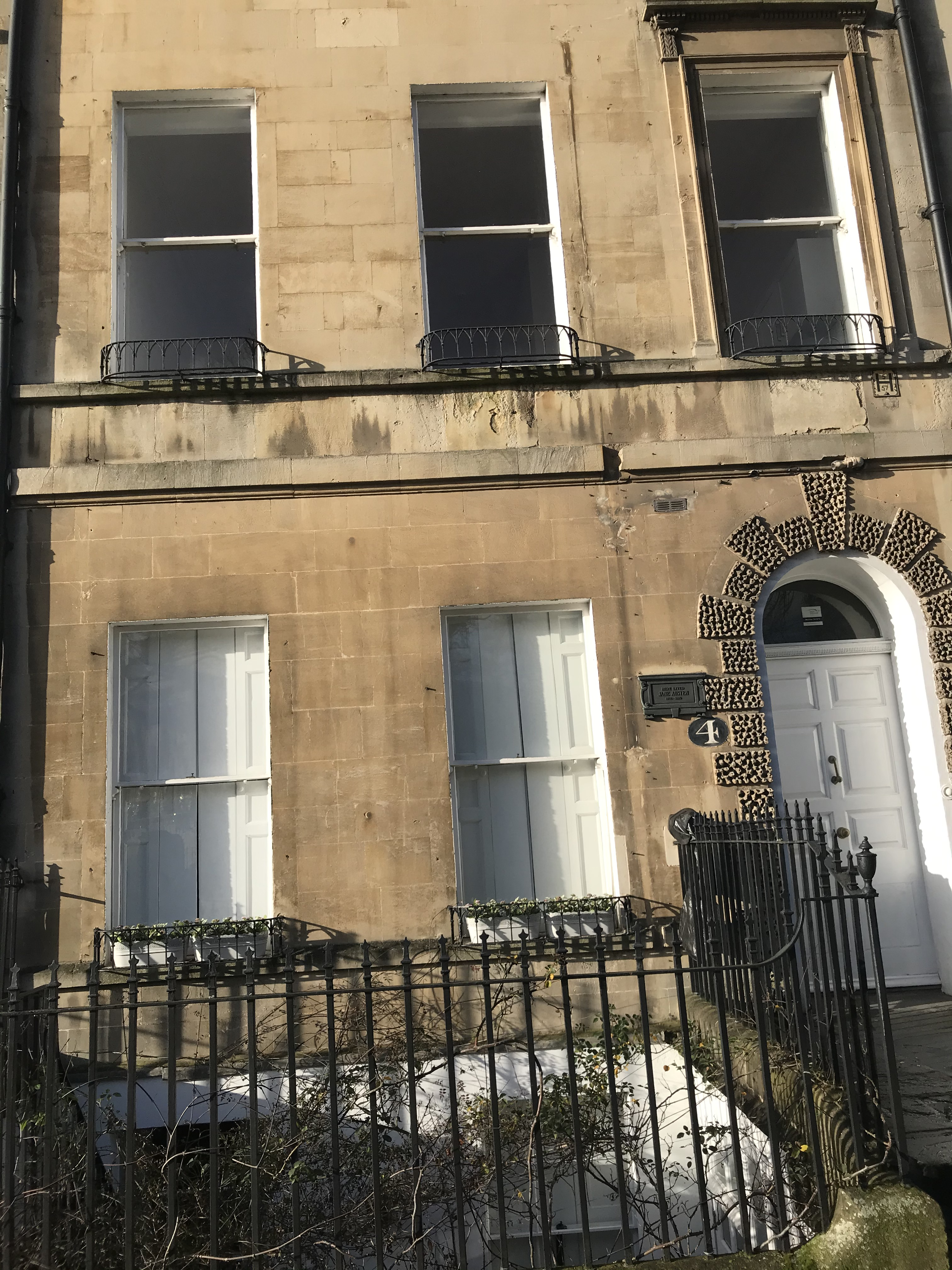
Austen's house, 4 Sydney Place, Bath

In December 1800 George Austen unexpectedly announced his decision to retire from the ministry, leave Steventon, and move the family to 4, Sydney Place in Bath, Somerset. While retirement and travel were good for the elder Austens, Jane Austen was shocked to be told she was moving 50 miles (80 km) away from the only home she had ever known. An indication of her state of mind is her lack of productivity as a writer during the time she lived in Bath. She was able to make some revisions to Susan, and she began and then abandoned a new novel, The Watsons, but there was nothing like the productivity of the years 1795–1799. Tomalin suggests this reflects a deep depression disabling her as a writer, but Honan disagrees, arguing Austen wrote or revised her manuscripts throughout her creative life, except for a few months after her father died. (Note: Doody agrees with Tomalin; see Doody, "Jane Austen, that disconcerting child", in Alexander and McMaster 2005, 105.) It is often claimed that Austen was unhappy in Bath, which caused her to lose interest in writing, but it is just as possible that Austen's social life in Bath prevented her from spending much time writing novels. The critic Robert Irvine argued that if Austen spent more time writing novels when she was in the countryside, it might just have been because she had more spare time as opposed to being more happy in the countryside as is often argued. Furthermore, Austen frequently both moved and travelled over southern England during this period, which was hardly a conducive environment for writing a long novel. Austen sold the rights to publish Susan to the publisher Crosby & Company, who paid her £10 (equivalent to £720 in 2025). Crosby & Company advertised Susan, but never published it.

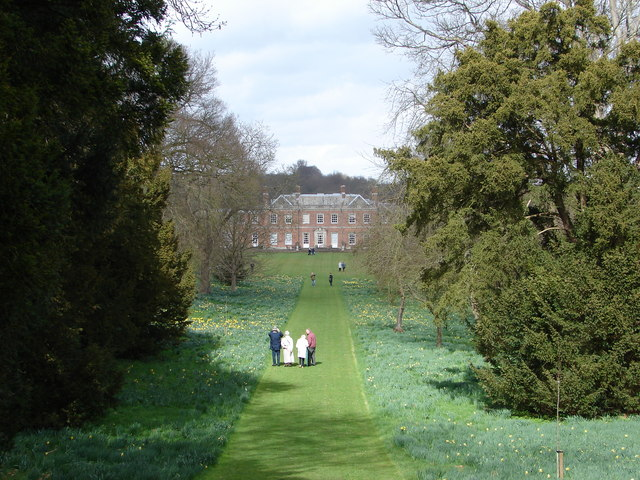
Austen was a regular visitor to her brother Edward's home, Godmersham Park in Kent, between 1798 and 1813. The house is regarded as an influence on her works.

The years from 1801 to 1804 are something of a blank space for Austen scholars as Cassandra destroyed all her letters from her sister in this period for unknown reasons. In December 1802 Austen received her only known proposal of marriage. She and her sister visited Alethea and Catherine Bigg, old friends who lived near Basingstoke. Their younger brother, Harris Bigg-Wither, had recently finished his education at Oxford and was also at home. Bigg-Wither proposed and Austen accepted. As described by Caroline Austen, Jane's niece, and Reginald Bigg-Wither, a descendant, Harris was not attractive—he was a large, plain-looking man who spoke little, stuttered when he did speak, was aggressive in conversation, and almost completely tactless. However, Austen had known him since both were young and the marriage offered many practical advantages to Austen and her family. He was the heir to extensive family estates located in the area where the sisters had grown up. With these resources, Austen could provide her parents a comfortable old age, give Cassandra a permanent home and, perhaps, assist her brothers in their careers. By the next morning, Austen realised she had made a mistake and withdrew her acceptance. No contemporary letters or diaries describe how Austen felt about this proposal. Irvine described Bigg-Wither as somebody who "...seems to have been a man very hard to like, let alone love".

In 1814 Austen wrote a letter to her niece Fanny Knight, who had asked for advice about a serious relationship, telling her that "having written so much on one side of the question, I shall now turn around & entreat you not to commit yourself farther, & not to think of accepting him unless you really do like him. Anything is to be preferred or endured rather than marrying without Affection". The scholar Douglas Bush wrote that Austen had "had a very high ideal of the love that should unite a husband and wife ... All of her heroines ... know in proportion to their maturity, the meaning of ardent love". A possible autobiographical element in Sense and Sensibility occurs when Elinor Dashwood contemplates "the worse and most irremediable of all evils, a connection for life" with an unsuitable man. (Note: Elinor Dashwood's original quote from chapter 29, page 159, of Sense and Sensibility is: "the worst and most irremediable of all evils, a connection, for life, with an unprincipled man.")

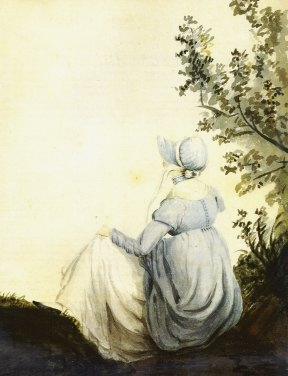
Watercolour of Jane Austen by her sister Cassandra, 1804

In 1804, while living in Bath, Austen started, but did not complete, her novel The Watsons. The story centres on an invalid and impoverished clergyman and his four unmarried daughters. Sutherland describes the novel as "a study in the harsh economic realities of dependent women's lives". Honan suggests, and Tomalin agrees, that Austen chose to stop work on the novel after her father died on 21 January 1805 and her personal circumstances resembled those of her characters too closely for her comfort.

Her father's relatively sudden death left Jane, Cassandra, and their mother in a precarious financial situation. Edward, James, Henry, and Francis Austen (known as Frank) pledged to make annual contributions to support their mother and sisters. For the next four years, the family's living arrangements reflected their financial insecurity. They spent part of the time in rented quarters in Bath before leaving the city in June 1805 for a family visit to Steventon and Godmersham. They moved for the autumn months to the newly fashionable seaside resort of Worthing, on the Sussex coast, where they resided at Stanford Cottage. (Note: Austen's observations of early Worthing probably helped inspire her final, but unfinished novel, Sanditon, the story of an up-and-coming seaside resort in Sussex.) It was here that Austen is thought to have written her fair copy of Lady Susan and added its "Conclusion". In 1806, the family moved to Southampton, where they shared a house with Frank Austen and his new wife. A large part of this time they spent visiting various branches of the family.

On 5 April 1809, about three months before the family's move to Chawton, Austen wrote an angry letter to Richard Crosby, offering him a new manuscript of Susan if needed to secure the immediate publication of the novel, and requesting the return of the original so she could find another publisher. Crosby replied that he had not agreed to publish the book by any particular time, or at all, and that Austen could repurchase the manuscript for the £10 he had paid her and find another publisher. She did not have the resources to buy the copyright back at that time, but was able to purchase it in 1816.

== Ages 34 to 41 ==
=== Chawton ===
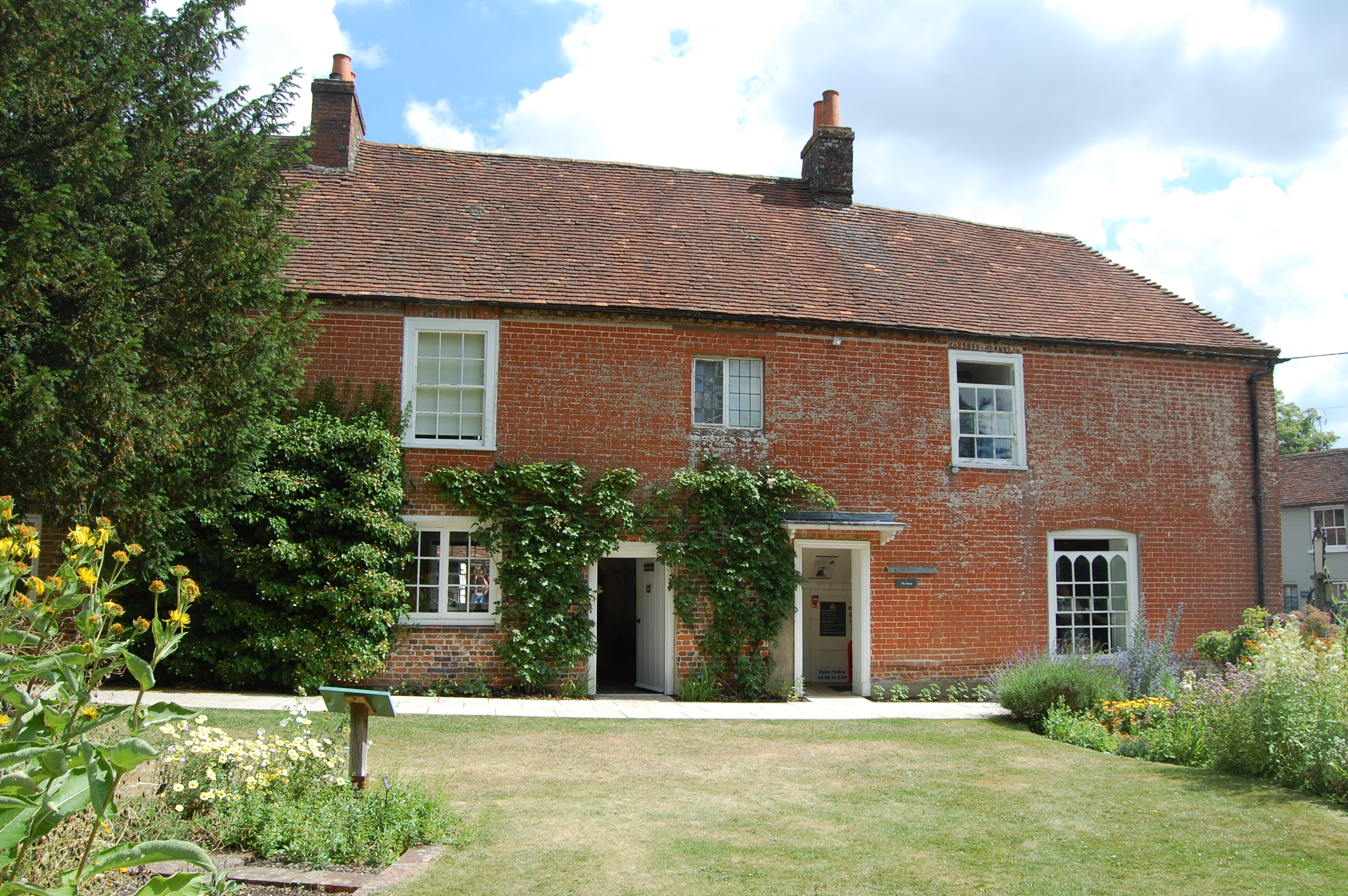
Cottage in Chawton, Hampshire, where Austen lived during her last eight years of life, now Jane Austen's House Museum

Around early 1809, Austen's brother Edward offered his mother and sisters a more settled life—the use of a large cottage in Chawton village (Note: Chawton had a population of 417 at the census of 1811.) which was part of the estate around Edward's nearby property Chawton House. Jane, Cassandra and their mother moved into Chawton cottage on 7 July 1809. Life was quieter in Chawton than it had been since the family's move to Bath in 1800. The Austens did not socialise with gentry and entertained only when family visited. Her niece Anna described the family's life in Chawton as "a very quiet life, according to our ideas, but they were great readers, and besides the housekeeping our aunts occupied themselves in working with the poor and in teaching some girl or boy to read or write."

=== Published author ===
Like many women authors at the time, Austen published her books anonymously. At the time, the ideal roles for a woman were as wife and mother, and writing for women was regarded at best as a secondary form of activity; a woman who wished to be a full-time writer was felt to be degrading her femininity, so books by women were usually published anonymously in order to maintain the conceit that the female writer was only publishing as a sort of part-time job, and was not seeking to become a "literary lioness" (i.e. a celebrity). Another reason noted is that the novel was still seen as a lesser form of literature at the time compared with poetry, and many female and male authors published novels anonymously, whereas works of poetry, by both female and male writers, were almost always attributed to the author.

During her time at Chawton, Austen published four generally well-received novels. Through her brother Henry, the publisher Thomas Egerton agreed to publish Sense and Sensibility, which, like all of Austen's novels except Pride and Prejudice, was published "on commission", that is, at the author's financial risk. When publishing on commission, publishers would advance the costs of publication, repay themselves as books were sold and then charge a 10% commission for each book sold, paying the rest to the author. If a novel did not recover its costs through sales, the author was responsible for them. The alternative to selling via commission was by selling the copyright, where an author received a one-time payment from the publisher for the manuscript, which occurred with Pride and Prejudice. Austen's experience with Susan (the manuscript that became Northanger Abbey) where she sold the copyright to the publisher Crosby & Sons for £10, who did not publish the book, forcing her to buy back the copyright in order to get her work published, left Austen leery of this method of publishing. The final alternative, of selling by subscription, where a group of people would agree to buy a book in advance, was not an option for Austen as only authors who were well known or had an influential aristocratic patron who would recommend an up-coming book to their friends, could sell by subscription. Sense and Sensibility appeared in October 1811, and was described as being written "By a Lady". As it was sold on commission, Egerton used expensive paper and set the price at 15 shillings (equivalent to £52 in 2025).

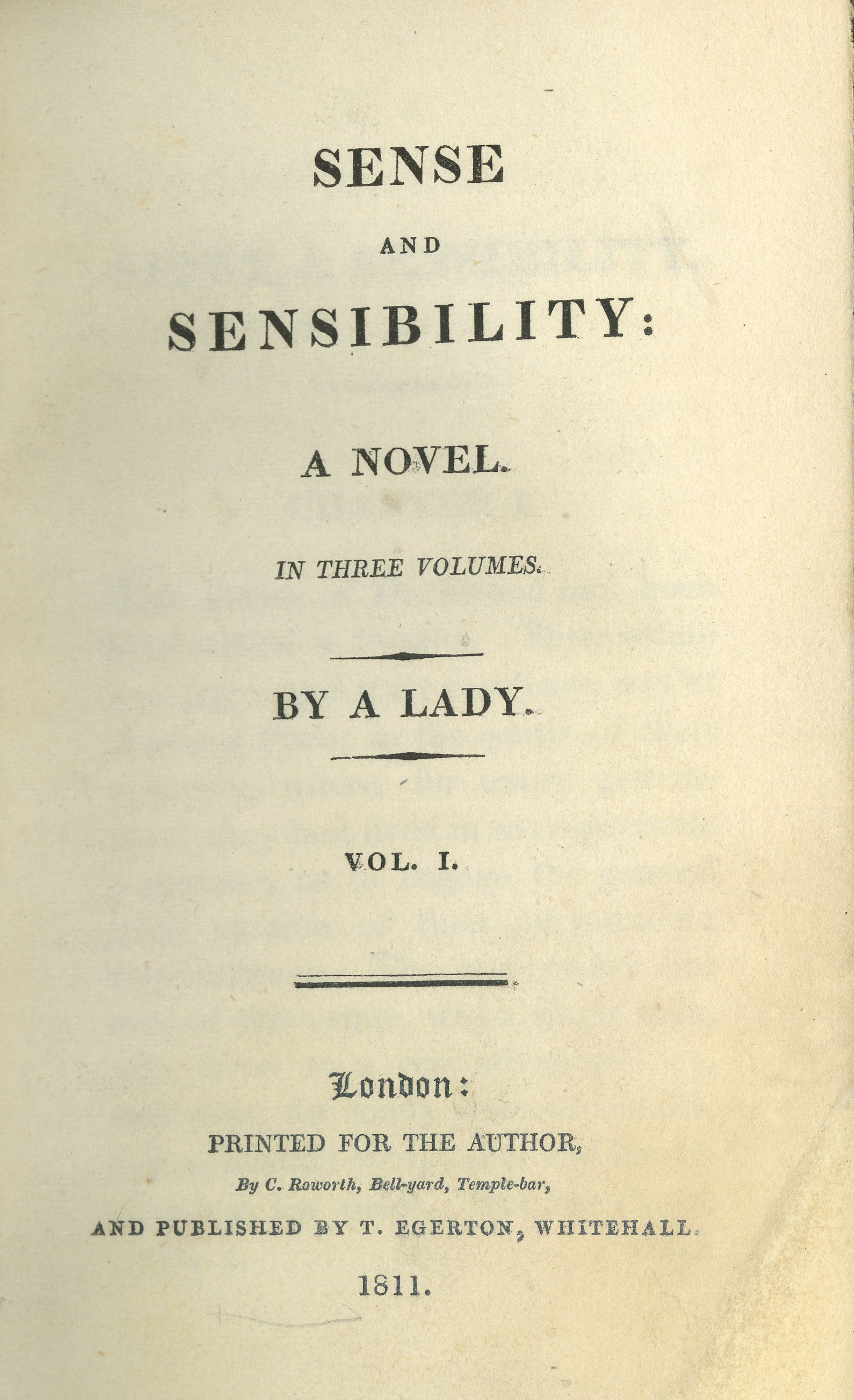
First edition title page from Sense and Sensibility, Austen's first published novel (1811)

Reviews were favourable and the novel became fashionable among young aristocratic opinion-makers; the edition sold out by mid-1813. Austen's novels were published in larger editions than was normal for this period. The small size of the novel-reading public and the large costs associated with hand production (particularly the cost of handmade paper) meant that most novels were published in editions of 500 copies or fewer to reduce the risks to the publisher and the novelist. Even some of the most successful titles during this period were issued in editions of not more than 750 or 800 copies and later reprinted if demand continued. Austen's novels were published in larger editions, ranging from about 750 copies of Sense and Sensibility to about 2,000 copies of Emma. It is not clear whether the decision to print more copies than usual of Austen's novels was driven by the publishers or the author. Since all but one of Austen's books were originally published "on commission", the risks of overproduction were largely hers (or Cassandra's after her death) and publishers may have been more willing to produce larger editions than was normal practice when their own funds were at risk. Editions of popular works of non-fiction were often much larger.

Austen made £140 (equivalent to £9,800 in 2025) from Sense and Sensibility, which provided her with some financial and psychological independence. After the success of Sense and Sensibility, all of Austen's subsequent books were billed as written "By the author of Sense and Sensibility" and Austen's name never appeared on her books during her lifetime. Egerton then published Pride and Prejudice, a revision of First Impressions, in January 1813. Austen sold the copyright to Pride and Prejudice to Egerton for £110 (equivalent to £6,600 in 2025). To maximise profits, he used cheap paper and set the price at 18 shillings (equivalent to £54 in 2025). He advertised the book widely and it was an immediate success, garnering three favourable reviews and selling well. Had Austen sold Pride and Prejudice on commission, she would have made a profit of £475, or twice her father's annual income. By October 1813, Egerton was able to begin selling a second edition. Mansfield Park was published by Egerton in May 1814. While Mansfield Park was ignored by reviewers, it was very popular with readers. All copies were sold within six months, and Austen's earnings on this novel were larger than for any of her other novels.

Without Austen's knowledge or approval, her novels were translated into French and published in cheaply produced, pirated editions in France. The literary critic Noel King commented in 1953 that, given the prevailing rage in France at the time for lush romantic fantasies, it was remarkable that her novels with the emphasis on everyday English life had any sort of a market in France. King cautioned that Austen's chief translator in France, Madame Isabelle de Montolieu, had only the most rudimentary knowledge of English, and her translations were more of "imitations" than translations proper, as Montolieu depended upon assistants to provide a summary, which she then translated into an embellished French that often radically altered Austen's plots and characters. The first of the Austen novels to be published that credited her as the author was in France, when Persuasion was published in 1821 as La Famille Elliot ou L'Ancienne Inclination.

Austen learned that the Prince Regent admired her novels and kept a set at each of his residences. (Note: The Prince Regent's admiration was by no means reciprocated. In a letter of 16 February 1813 to her friend Martha Lloyd, Austen says (referring to the Prince's wife, whom he treated notoriously badly) "I hate her Husband".) In November 1815 the Prince Regent's librarian James Stanier Clarke invited Austen to visit the Prince's London residence and hinted Austen should dedicate the forthcoming Emma to the Prince. Though Austen disapproved of the Prince Regent, she could scarcely refuse the request. Austen disapproved of the Prince Regent on the account of his womanising, gambling, drinking, spendthrift ways, and generally disreputable behaviour. She later wrote Plan of a Novel, According to Hints from Various Quarters, a satiric outline of the "perfect novel" based on the librarian's many suggestions for a future Austen novel. Austen was greatly annoyed by Clarke's often pompous literary advice, and the Plan of a Novel parodying Clarke was intended as her revenge for all the unwanted letters she had received from the royal librarian.

In mid-1815 Austen moved her work from Egerton to John Murray, a better-known publisher in London, (Note: John Murray also published the work of Walter Scott and Lord Byron. In a letter to Cassandra dated 17/18 October 1816, Austen comments that "Mr. Murray's Letter is come; he is a Rogue of course, but a civil one.") who published Emma in December 1815 and a second edition of Mansfield Park in February 1816. Emma sold well, but the new edition of Mansfield Park did poorly, and this failure offset most of the income from Emma. These were the last of Austen's novels to be published during her lifetime.

While Murray prepared Emma for publication, Austen began The Elliots, later published as Persuasion. She completed her first draft in July 1816. In addition, shortly after the publication of Emma, Henry Austen repurchased the copyright for Susan from Crosby. Austen was forced to postpone publishing either of these completed novels by family financial troubles. Henry Austen's bank failed in March 1816, depriving him of all of his assets, leaving him deeply in debt and costing Edward, James, and Frank Austen large sums. Henry and Frank could no longer afford the contributions they had made to support their mother and sisters.

=== Illness and death ===
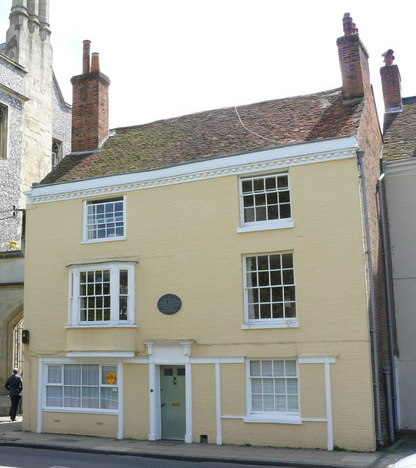
8 College Street in Winchester where Austen lived her last days and died

Austen was feeling unwell by early 1816, but ignored the warning signs. By the middle of that year, her decline was unmistakable, and she began a slow, irregular deterioration. The majority of biographers rely on Zachary Cope's 1964 retrospective diagnosis and list her cause of death as Addison's disease, although her final illness has also been described as resulting from Hodgkin's lymphoma. (Note: Claire Tomalin prefers a diagnosis of a lymphoma such as Hodgkin's disease.) When her uncle died and left his entire fortune to his wife, effectively disinheriting his relatives, she suffered a relapse, writing: "I am ashamed to say that the shock of my Uncle's Will brought on a relapse ... but a weak Body must excuse weak Nerves."

Austen continued to work in spite of her illness. Dissatisfied with the ending of The Elliots, she rewrote the final two chapters, which she finished on 6 August 1816. (Note: The manuscript of the revised final chapters of Persuasion is the only surviving manuscript for any of her published novels in her own handwriting. Cassandra and Henry Austen chose the final titles and the title page is dated 1818.) In January 1817 Austen began The Brothers (titled Sanditon when published in 1925), completing twelve chapters before stopping work in mid-March 1817, probably due to illness. Todd describes Sanditon's heroine, Diana Parker, as an "energetic invalid". In the novel Austen mocked hypochondriacs, and although she describes the heroine as "bilious", five days after abandoning the novel she wrote of herself that she was turning "every wrong colour" and living "chiefly on the sofa". She put down her pen on 18 March 1817, making a note of it.

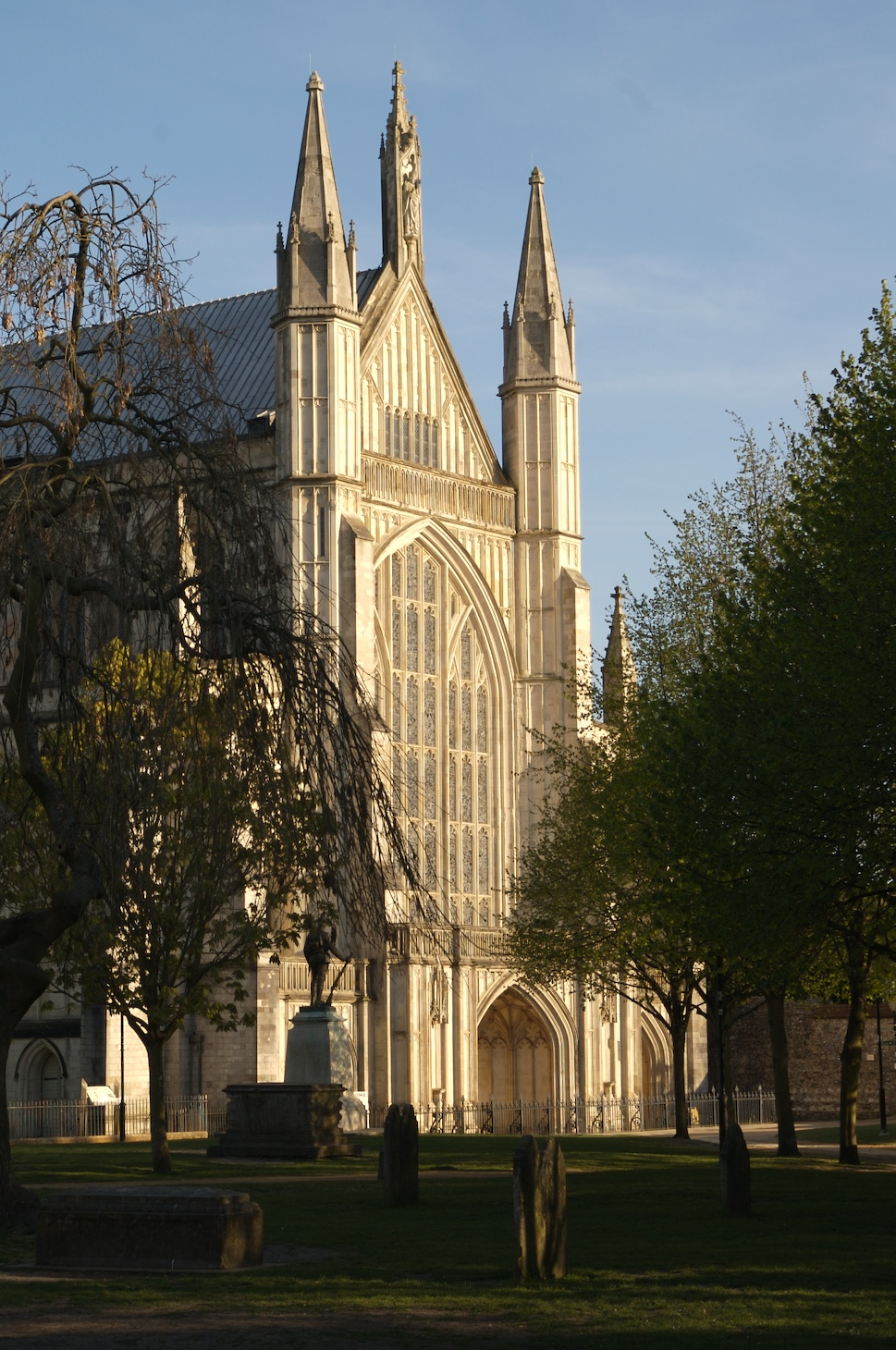
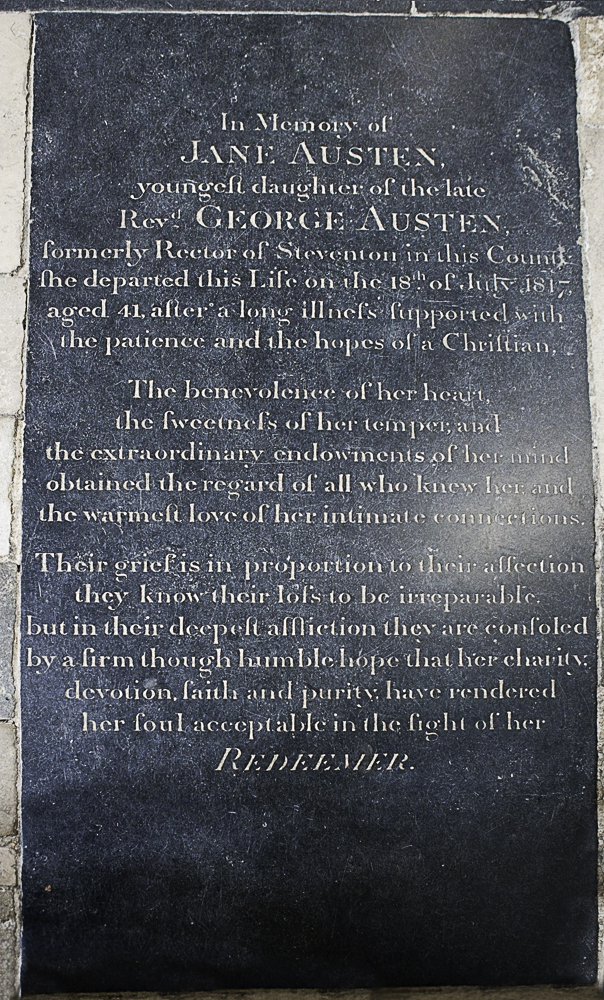
Winchester Cathedral, where Austen is buried, and her memorial gravestone in the nave of the Cathedral

Austen made light of her condition, describing it as "bile" and rheumatism. As her illness progressed, she experienced difficulty walking and lacked energy; by mid-April she was confined to bed. In May, Cassandra and Henry took her to Winchester for treatment, by which time she suffered agonising pain and welcomed death.

Austen died in Winchester on 18 July 1817 at the age of 41. Henry, through his clerical connections, arranged for his sister to be buried in the north aisle of the nave of Winchester Cathedral. The epitaph composed by her brother James praises Austen's personal qualities, expresses hope for her salvation, and mentions the "extraordinary endowments of her mind", but does not explicitly mention her achievements as a writer.

== Posthumous publication ==
In the months after Austen's death in July 1817, Cassandra, Henry Austen and Murray arranged for the publication of Persuasion and Northanger Abbey as a set. (Note: Honan points to "the odd fact that most of [Austen's] reviewers sound like Mr. Collins" as evidence that contemporary critics felt that works oriented toward the interests and concerns of women were intrinsically less important and less worthy of critical notice than works (mostly non-fiction) oriented towards men.) Henry Austen contributed a Biographical Note dated December 1817, which for the first time identified his sister as the author of the novels. Tomalin describes it as "a loving and polished eulogy". Sales were good for a year—only 321 copies remained unsold at the end of 1818.

Although Austen's six novels were out of print in England in the 1820s, they were still being read through copies housed in private libraries and circulating libraries. Austen had early admirers. The first piece of fiction using her as a character (what might now be called real person fiction) appeared in 1823 in a letter to the editor in The Lady's Magazine. It refers to Austen's genius and suggests that aspiring authors were envious of her powers.

In 1832 Richard Bentley purchased the remaining copyrights to all of her novels, and over the following winter published five illustrated volumes as part of his Standard Novels series. In October 1833 Bentley released the first collected edition of her works. Since then, Austen's novels have been continuously in print.

== Genre and style ==
Austen's works implicitly critique the sentimental novels of the second half of the 18th century and are part of the transition to 19th-century literary realism. (Note: Oliver MacDonagh says that Sense and Sensibility "may well be the first English realistic novel" based on its detailed and accurate portrayal of what he calls "getting and spending" in an English gentry family.) The earliest English novelists, Samuel Richardson, Henry Fielding, and Tobias Smollett, were followed by the school of sentimentalists and romantics such as Sir Walter Scott, Horace Walpole, Clara Reeve, Ann Radcliffe, and Oliver Goldsmith, whose style and genre Austen repudiated, returning the novel on a "slender thread" to the tradition of Richardson and Fielding for a "realistic study of manners". In the mid-20th century the literary critics F. R. Leavis and Ian Watt placed her in the tradition of Richardson and Fielding; both believe that she used their tradition of "irony, realism and satire to form an author superior to both".

Walter Scott noted Austen's "resistance to the trashy sensationalism of much of modern fiction—'the ephemeral productions which supply the regular demand of watering places and circulating libraries'". Yet her relationship with these genres is complex, as evidenced by Northanger Abbey and Emma. Similar to William Wordsworth, who excoriated the modern frantic novel in the "Preface" to his Lyrical Ballads (1800), Austen distances herself from escapist novels; the discipline and innovation she demonstrates is similar to his, and she shows "that rhetorically less is artistically more." She eschewed popular Gothic fiction, stories of terror in which a heroine typically was stranded in a remote location, a castle or abbey (32 novels between 1784 and 1818 contain the word "abbey" in their title). Yet in Northanger Abbey she alludes to the trope, with the heroine, Catherine, anticipating a move to a remote locale. Rather than full-scale rejection or parody, Austen transforms the genre, juxtaposing reality, with descriptions of elegant rooms and modern comforts, against the heroine's "novel-fueled" desires. Nor does she completely denigrate Gothic fiction: instead she transforms settings and situations, such that the heroine is still imprisoned, yet her imprisonment is mundane and real—regulated manners and the strict rules of the ballroom. In Sense and Sensibility Austen presents characters who are more complex than in staple sentimental fiction, according to the critic Tom Keymer, who notes that although it is a parody of popular sentimental fiction, "Marianne in her sentimental histrionics responds to the calculating world ... with a quite justifiable scream of female distress."

The hair was curled, and the maid sent away, and Emma sat down to think and be miserable. It was a wretched business, indeed! Such an overthrow of everything she had been wishing for! Such a development of every thing most unwelcome!

— example of free indirect speech, Jane Austen, Emma

Richardson's Pamela, the prototype for the sentimental novel, is a didactic love story with a happy ending, written at a time women were beginning to have the right to choose husbands and yet were restricted by social conventions. Austen attempted Richardson's epistolary style, but found the flexibility of narrative more conducive to her realism, a realism in which each conversation and gesture carries a weight of significance. The narrative style utilises free indirect speech—she was the first English novelist to do so extensively—through which she had the ability to present a character's thoughts directly to the reader and yet still retain narrative control. The style allows an author to vary discourse between the narrator's voice and values and those of the characters.

Austen had a natural ear for speech and dialogue, according to the scholar Mary Lascelles: "Few novelists can be more scrupulous than Jane Austen as to the phrasing and thoughts of their characters." Techniques such as fragmentary speech suggest a character's traits and their tone; "syntax and phrasing rather than vocabulary" is utilised to indicate social variants. Dialogue reveals a character's mood—frustration, anger, happiness—each treated differently and often through varying patterns of sentence structures. When Elizabeth Bennet rejects Darcy, her stilted speech and the convoluted sentence structure reveals that he has wounded her:

From the very beginning, from the first moment I may almost say, of my acquaintance with you, your manners impressing me with the fullest belief of your arrogance, your conceit, and your selfish disdain of the feelings of others, were such as to form that the groundwork of disapprobation, on which succeeding events have built so immovable a dislike. And I had not known you a month before I felt that you were the last man in the world whom I could ever be prevailed on to marry.

Austen's plots highlight women's traditional dependence on marriage to secure social standing and economic security. As an art form, the 18th-century novel lacked the seriousness of its equivalents from the 19th century, when novels were treated as "the natural vehicle for discussion and ventilation of what mattered in life". Rather than delving too deeply into the psyche of her characters, Austen enjoys them and imbues them with humour, according to critic John Bayley. He believes that the well-spring of her wit and irony is her own attitude that comedy "is the saving grace of life". Part of Austen's fame rests on the historical and literary significance that she was the first woman to write great comic novels. Samuel Johnson's influence is evident, in that she follows his advice to write "a representation of life as may excite mirth".

Her humour comes from her modesty and lack of superiority, allowing her most successful characters, such as Elizabeth Bennet, to transcend the trivialities of life, which the more foolish characters are overly absorbed in. Austen used comedy to explore the individualism of women's lives and gender relations, and she appears to have used it to find the goodness in life, often fusing it with "ethical sensibility", creating artistic tension. Critic Robert Polhemus writes, "To appreciate the drama and achievement of Austen, we need to realize how deep was her passion for both reverence and ridicule ... and her comic imagination reveals both the harmonies and the telling contradictions of her mind and vision as she tries to reconcile her satirical bias with her sense of the good."

== Reception ==
=== Contemporaneous responses ===
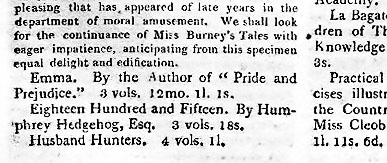
In 1816 the editors of The New Monthly Magazine noted Emma's publication, but chose not to review it.

As Austen's works were published anonymously, they brought her little personal renown. They were fashionable among opinion-makers, but were rarely reviewed. Most of the reviews were short and on balance favourable, although superficial and cautious, most often focused on the moral lessons of the novels.

Sir Walter Scott, a leading novelist of the day, anonymously wrote a review of Emma in 1815, using it to defend the then-disreputable genre of the novel and praising Austen's realism, "the art of copying from nature as she really exists in the common walks of life, and presenting to the reader, instead of the splendid scenes from an imaginary world, a correct and striking representation of that which is daily taking place around him". The other important early review was attributed to Richard Whately in 1821. However, Whately denied having authored the review, which drew favourable comparisons between Austen and such acknowledged greats as Homer and William Shakespeare, and praised the dramatic qualities of her narrative. These two reviews set the tone for almost all subsequent 19th-century Austen criticism.

=== 19th century ===
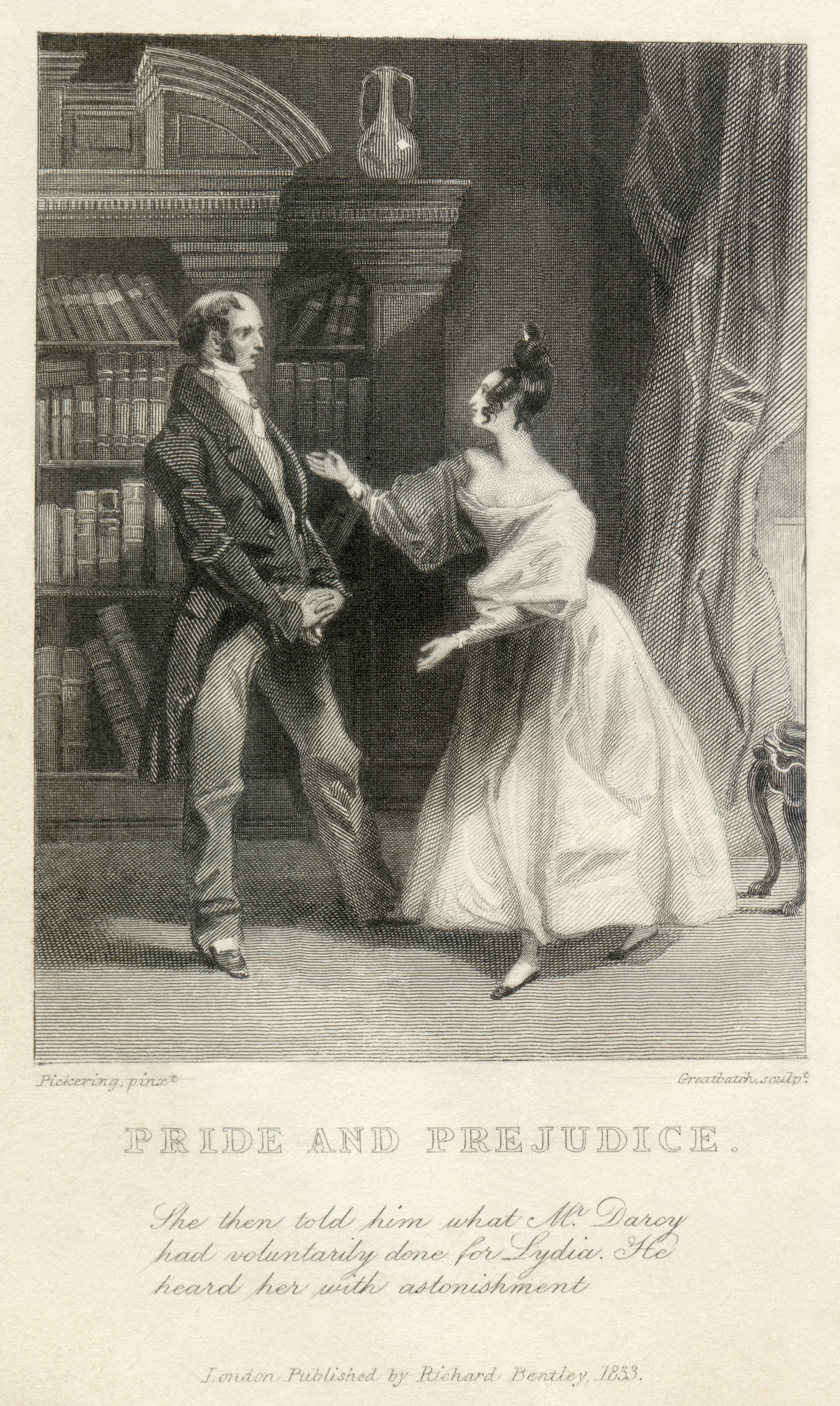
One of the first two published illustrations of Pride and Prejudice, from the Richard Bentley edition. Caption reads: "She then told him [Mr Bennett] what Mr Darcy had voluntarily done for Lydia. He heard her with astonishment."

Because Austen's novels did not conform to Romantic and Victorian expectations that "powerful emotion [be] authenticated by an egregious display of sound and colour in the writing", some 19th-century critics preferred the works of Charles Dickens and George Eliot. Notwithstanding Walter Scott's positivity, Austen's work did not win over those who preferred the prevailing aesthetic values of the elite Romantic zeitgeist. Her novels were republished in Britain from the 1830s and sold steadily. Austen's six books were included in the canon-making Standard Novels series by publisher Richard Bentley, which increased their stature. That series referred to her as "the founder of a school of novelists" and called her a genius.

The first French critic who paid notice to Austen was Philarète Chasles in an 1842 essay, dismissing her in two sentences as a boring, imitative writer with no substance. Austen was not widely appreciated in France until 1878, when the French critic Léon Boucher published the essay Le Roman Classique en Angleterre, in which he called Austen a "genius", the first French author to do so. The first accurate translation of Austen into French occurred in 1899 when Félix Fénéon translated Northanger Abbey as Catherine Morland.

In Britain and North America, Austen gradually grew in the estimation of both the public and the literati. In the United States, Austen was being recommended as reading in schools as early as 1838, according to Professor Devoney Looser. The philosopher and literary critic George Henry Lewes published a series of enthusiastic articles in the 1840s and 1850s. Later in the century, the novelist Henry James referred to Austen several times with approval, and on one occasion ranked her with Shakespeare, Miguel de Cervantes, and Henry Fielding as amongst "the fine painters of life".

The publication of James Edward Austen-Leigh's A Memoir of Jane Austen in 1869 introduced Austen's life story to a wider public as "dear aunt Jane", the respectable maiden aunt. Publication of the Memoir spurred another reissue of Austen's novels. Editions were released in 1883 and fancy illustrated editions and collectors' sets quickly followed. The author and critic Leslie Stephen described the popular mania that started to develop for Austen in the 1880s as "Austenolatry". Around the start of the 20th century, an intellectual clique of Janeites reacted against the popularisation of Austen, distinguishing their deeper appreciation from the vulgar enthusiasm of the masses.

In response, Henry James decried "a beguiled infatuation" with Austen, a rising tide of public interest that exceeded Austen's "intrinsic merit and interest". The American literary critic A. Walton Litz noted that the "anti-Janites" in the 19th and 20th centuries comprised a formidable literary squad of Mark Twain, Henry James, Charlotte Brontë, D. H. Lawrence, and Kingsley Amis, but in "every case the adverse judgement merely reveals the special limitations or eccentricities of the critic, leaving Jane Austen relatively untouched".

=== Modern ===
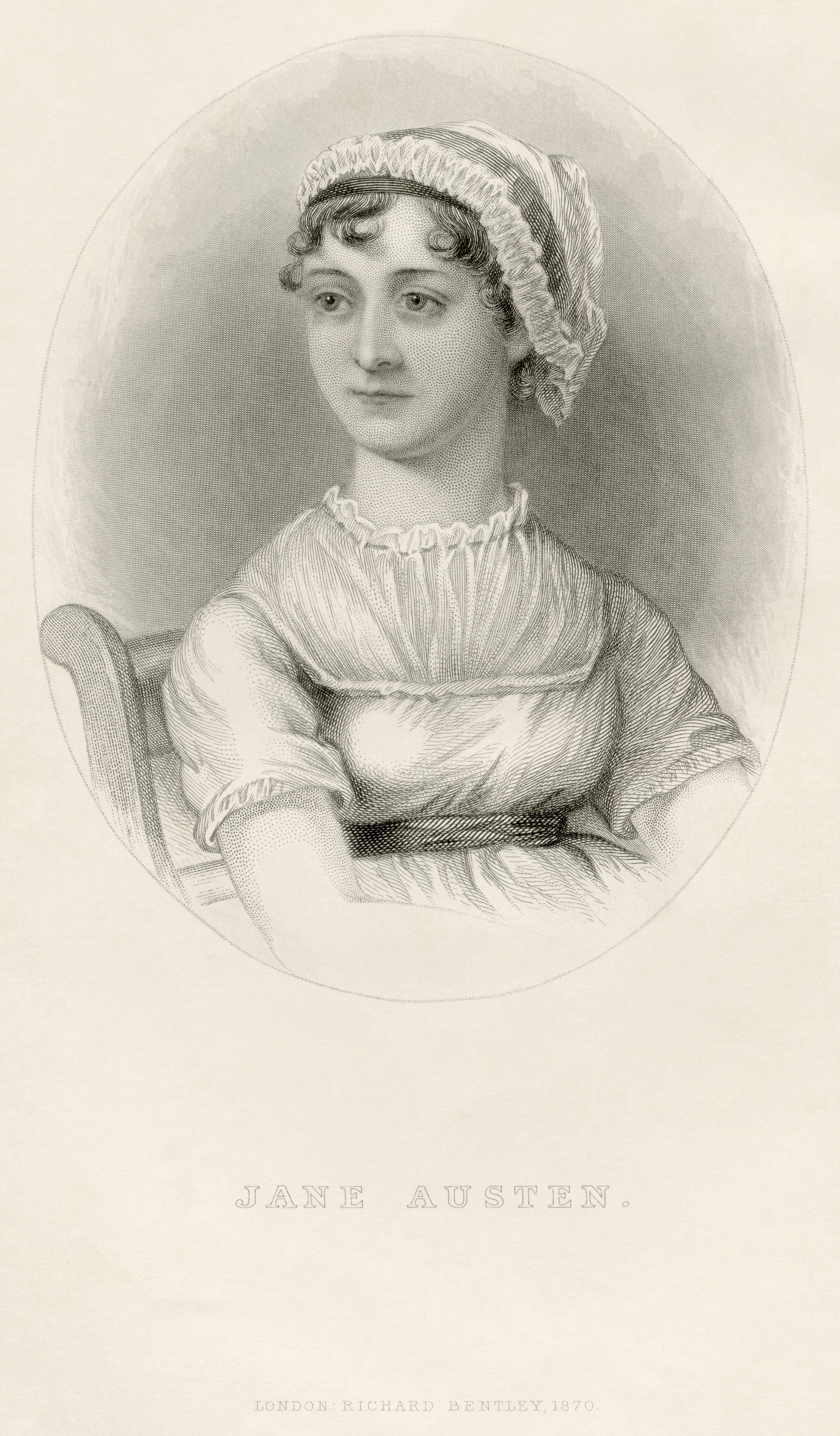
Depiction of Austen from A Memoir of Jane Austen (1871) written by her nephew James Edward Austen-Leigh, and based on the sketch by Cassandra. All subsequent portraits of Austen are generally based on this, including on the reverse of the Bank of England £10 note introduced in September 2017.

Austen's works have attracted legions of scholars. The first dissertation on Austen was published in 1883, by George Pellew, a student at Harvard University. Another early academic analysis came from a 1911 essay by the Oxford Shakespearean scholar A. C. Bradley, who grouped Austen's novels into "early" and "late" works, a distinction still used by scholars today. The first academic book devoted to Austen in France was Jane Austen by Paul and Kate Rague (1914), who set out to explain why French critics and readers should take Austen seriously. The same year, Léonie Villard published Jane Austen, Sa Vie et Ses Oeuvres, originally her PhD thesis, the first serious academic study of Austen in France. In 1923, R.W. Chapman published the first scholarly edition of Austen's collected works, which was also the first scholarly edition of any English novelist. The Chapman text has remained the basis for all subsequent published editions of Austen's works.

With the publication in 1939 of Mary Lascelles' Jane Austen and Her Art, the academic study of Austen took hold. Lascelles analysed the books Austen read and their influence on her work, and closely examined Austen's style and "narrative art". Concern arose that academics were obscuring the appreciation of Austen with increasingly esoteric theories, a debate that has continued since.

The period since the Second World War has seen a diversity of critical approaches to Austen, including feminist theory, and perhaps most controversially, postcolonial theory. The divide has widened between the popular appreciation of Austen, particularly by modern Janeites, and academic judgements. In 1994 the literary critic Harold Bloom placed Austen among the greatest Western writers of all time.

In the People's Republic of China after 1949, writings of Austen were regarded as too frivolous, and thus during the Chinese Cultural Revolution of 1966–76, Austen was banned as a "British bourgeois imperialist". In the late 1970s, when Austen's works were re-published in China, her popularity with readers confounded the authorities who had trouble understanding that people generally read books for enjoyment, not political edification.

The conservative American professor Gene Koppel claimed that Austen and her family were "Tories of the deepest dye", i.e. Conservatives in opposition to the liberal Whigs. Although several feminist authors such as Claudia Johnson and Mollie Sandock claimed Austen for their own cause, Koppel argued that different people react to a work of literature in different subjective ways, as explained by the philosopher Hans-Georg Gadamer. Thus competing interpretations of Austen's work can be equally valid, provided they are grounded in textual and historical analysis: it is equally possible to see Austen as a feminist critiquing Regency-era society and as a conservative upholding its values.

== Adaptations ==
=== Written ===
Austen's novels have resulted in sequels, prequels and adaptations of almost every type, from soft-core pornography to fantasy. From the 19th century, her family members published conclusions to her incomplete novels, and by 2000 there were over 100 printed adaptations.

=== Drama, film and television ===
The first dramatic adaptation of Austen was published in 1895, Rosina Filippi's Duologues and Scenes from the Novels of Jane Austen: Arranged and Adapted for Drawing-Room Performance, and Filippi was also responsible for the first professional stage adaptation, The Bennets (1901).

The first film adaptation was the 1940 MGM production of Pride and Prejudice starring Laurence Olivier and Greer Garson. BBC television dramatisations released in the 1970s and 1980s attempted to adhere meticulously to Austen's plots, characterisations and settings. The British critic Robert Irvine noted that in American film adaptations of Austen's novels, starting with the 1940 version of Pride and Prejudice, class is subtly downplayed, and the society of Regency England depicted by Austen that is grounded in a hierarchy based upon the ownership of land and the antiquity of the family name is one that Americans cannot embrace in its entirety.

From 1995 many Austen adaptations appeared, with Ang Lee's film of Sense and Sensibility, for which screenwriter and star Emma Thompson won an Academy Award, and the BBC's immensely popular television miniseries Pride and Prejudice, starring Jennifer Ehle and Colin Firth. A 2005 British production of Pride & Prejudice, directed by Joe Wright and starring Keira Knightley and Matthew Macfadyen, was followed in 2007 by ITV's Mansfield Park, Northanger Abbey and Persuasion, and in 2016 by Love & Friendship starring Kate Beckinsale as Lady Susan, a film version of Lady Susan, that borrowed the title of Austen's Love and Freindship [sic].

== Honours ==
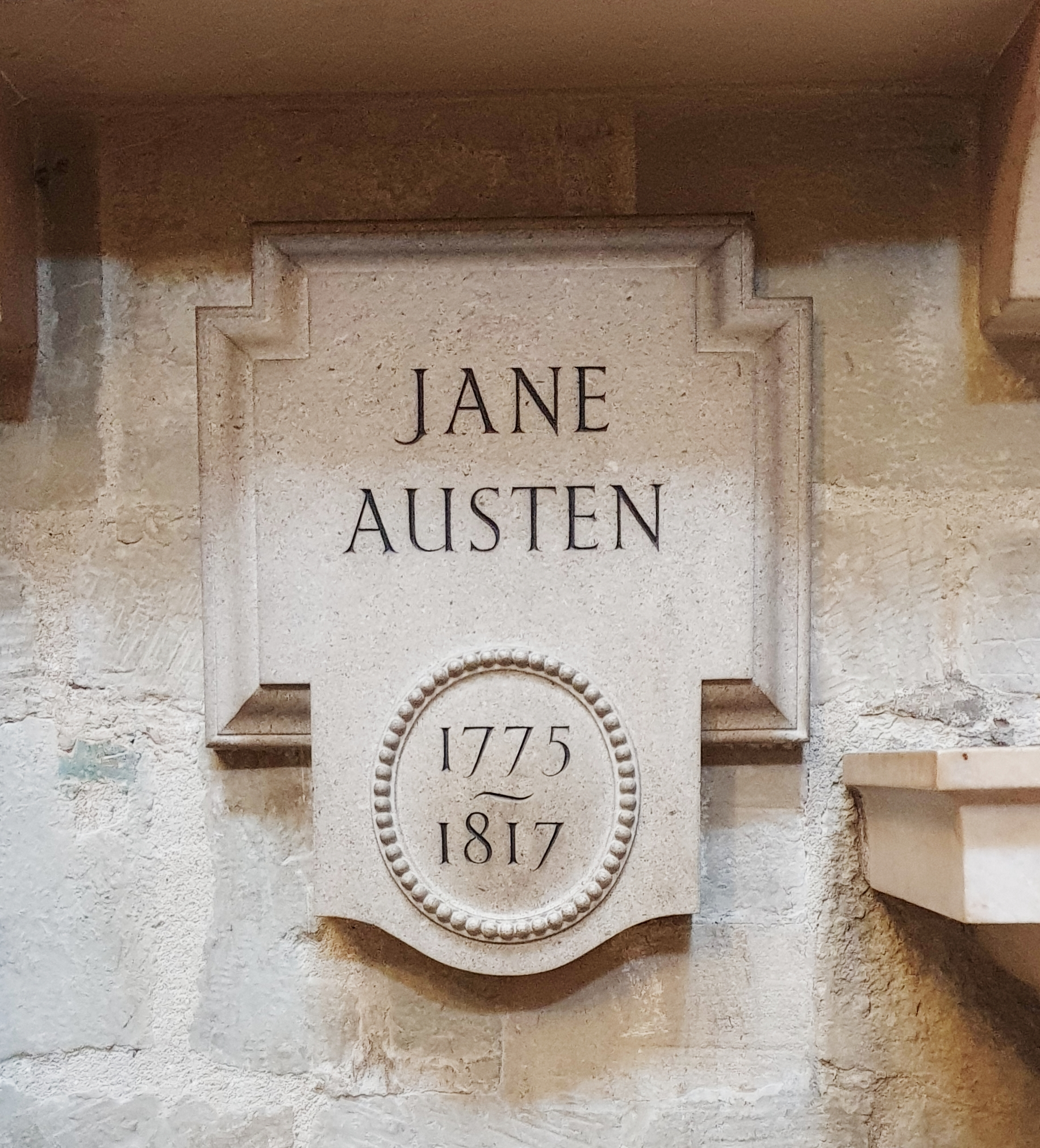
Austen commemoration on the wall of Poets' Corner in Westminster Abbey, London

In 2013 Austen's works featured on a series of British postage stamps issued by the Royal Mail to mark the bicentenary of the publication of Pride and Prejudice. Austen is on the £10 note issued by the Bank of England which was introduced in 2017, replacing Charles Darwin. In July 2017 a statue of Austen was erected in Basingstoke, Hampshire, on the 200th anniversary of her death. A statue of Austen by Martin Jennings was unveiled in October 2025 at The Close, near Winchester Cathedral.

== List of works ==
Novels
- Sense and Sensibility (1811)
- Pride and Prejudice (1813)
- Mansfield Park (1814)
- Emma (1815)
- Northanger Abbey (1818, posthumous)
- Persuasion (1818, posthumous)

Unfinished fiction

- The Watsons (1804)
- Sanditon (1817)

Other works

- Sir Charles Grandison (adapted play) (1793, 1800) (Note: The full title of this short play is Sir Charles Grandison or The happy Man, a Comedy in 6 acts. For more information see Southam (1986), 187–189.)
- Plan of a Novel (1815)
- Poems (1796–1817)
- Prayers (1796–1817)
- Letters (1796–1817)
- Lady Susan (novella) (1871, posthumous)

Juvenilia—Volume the First (1787–1793) (Note: This list of the juvenilia is taken from The Works of Jane Austen. Vol VI. 1954. Ed. R.W. Chapman and B.C. Southam. Oxford: Oxford University Press, 1988, as supplemented by additional research reflected in Margaret Anne Doody and Douglas Murray, eds. Catharine and Other Writings. Oxford: Oxford University Press, 1993.)

- Frederic & Elfrida
- Jack & Alice
- Edgar & Emma
- Henry and Eliza
- The Adventures of Mr. Harley
- Sir William Mountague
- Memoirs of Mr. Clifford
- The Beautifull Cassandra [sic]
- Amelia Webster
- The Visit
- The Mystery
- The Three Sisters
- A Fragment
- A beautiful description
- The generous Curate
- Ode to Pity

Juvenilia—Volume the Second (1787–1793)

- Love and Freindship [sic]
- Lesley Castle
- The History of England
- A Collection of Letters
- The female philosopher
- The first Act of a Comedy
- A Letter from a Young Lady
- A Tour through Wales
- A Tale

Juvenilia—Volume the Third (1787–1793)

- Evelyn
- Catharine, or The Bower

== Family trees ==
Austen, her parents and her siblings
Her siblings, nieces and nephews

== See also ==
- Jane Austen's literary universe
- Jane Austen's family and ancestry

== Sources ==
- Alexander, Christine and Juliet McMaster, eds. The Child Writer from Austen to Woolf. Cambridge: Cambridge University Press, 2005. ISBN 0-521-81293-3.
- Auerbach, Emily. Searching for Jane Austen. Madison: University of Wisconsin Press, 2004. ISBN 0-299-20184-8
- Austen, Jane. Catharine and Other Writings. Ed. Margaret Anne Doody and Douglas Murray. Oxford: Oxford University Press, 1993. ISBN 0-19-282823-1.
- Austen, Jane. The History of England. Ed. David Starkey. Icon Books, HarperCollins Publishers, 2006. ISBN 0-06-135195-4.
- Austen, Henry Thomas. "Biographical Notice of the Author". Northanger Abbey and Persuasion. London: John Murray, 1817.
- Austen-Leigh, James Edward. A Memoir of Jane Austen. 1926. Ed. R.W. Chapman. Oxford: Oxford University Press, 1967.
- Austen-Leigh, William and Richard Arthur Austen-Leigh. Jane Austen: Her Life and Letters, A Family Record. London: Smith, Elder & Co., 1913.
- Bayley, John. "Characterization in Jane Austen". The Jane Austen Companion. Ed. J. David Grey. New York: Macmillan Publishing Company, 1986. ISBN 0-02-545540-0. 24–34
- Baker, Amy. "Caught in the Act of Greatness: Jane Austen's Characterization Of Elizabeth And Darcy By Sentence Structure In Pride and Prejudice". Explicator, Vol. 72, Issue 3, 2014. 169–178
- Brownstein, Rachel M. "Out of the Drawing Room, Onto the Lawn". Jane Austen in Hollywood. Eds. Linda Troost and Sayre Greenfield. Lexington: University Press of Kentucky, 2001 ISBN 0-8131-9006-1. 13–21.
- Butler, Marilyn. "History, Politics and Religion". The Jane Austen Companion. Ed. J. David Grey. New York: Macmillan Publishing Company, 1986. ISBN 0-02-545540-0. 190–208
- Byrne, Paula. Jane Austen and the Theatre. London and New York: Continuum, 2002. ISBN 978-1-84725-047-6.
- Cartmell, Deborah and Whelehan, Imelda, eds. The Cambridge Companion to Literature on Screen. Cambridge: Cambridge University Press, 2007. ISBN 978-0-521-84962-3.
- Collins, Irene. Jane Austen and the Clergy. London: The Hambledon Press, 1994. ISBN 1-85285-114-7.
- Copeland, Edward and Juliet McMaster, eds. The Cambridge Companion to Jane Austen. Cambridge: Cambridge University Press, 2014. ISBN 978-0-521-74650-2.
- Doody, Margaret Anne. "The Early Short Fiction". The Cambridge Companion to Jane Austen. Eds. Edward Copeland and Juliet McMaster. Cambridge: Cambridge University Press, 2014. ISBN 978-0-521-74650-2. 72–86.
- Duffy, Joseph. "Criticism, 1814–1870". The Jane Austen Companion. Ed. J. David Grey. New York: Macmillan Publishing Company, 1986. ISBN 0-02-545540-0. 93–101
- Fergus, Jan. "Biography". Jane Austen in Context. Ed. Janet Todd. Cambridge: Cambridge University Press, 2005. ISBN 0-521-82644-6. 3–11
- Fergus, Jan. "The Professional Woman Writer". The Cambridge Companion to Jane Austen. Eds. Edward Copeland and Juliet McMaster. Cambridge: Cambridge University Press, 2014. ISBN 978-0-521-74650-2. 1–20.
- Gay, Penny. Jane Austen and the Theatre. Cambridge: Cambridge University Press, 2002. ISBN 0-521-65213-8.
- Gilson, David. "Letter publishing history". Jane Austen in Context. Ed. Janet Todd. Cambridge: Cambridge University Press, 2005. ISBN 0-521-82644-6. 121–159
- Gilson, David. "Editions and Publishing History". The Jane Austen Companion. Ed. J. David Grey. New York: Macmillan, 1986. ISBN 0-02-545540-0. 135–139
- Grey, J. David. The Jane Austen Companion. New York: Macmillan Publishing Company, 1986. ISBN 0-02-545540-0.
- Grundy, Isobel. "Jane Austen and literary traditions". The Cambridge Companion to Jane Austen. Eds. Edward Copeland and Juliet McMaster. Cambridge: Cambridge University Press, 2014. ISBN 978-0-521-74650-2. 192–214
- Halperin, John. "Jane Austen's Lovers". SEL: Studies in English Literature 1500–1900 Vol. 25, No. 4, Autumn, 1985. 719–720
- Harding, D.W., "Regulated Hatred: An Aspect of the Work of Jane Austen". Jane Austen: A Collection of Critical Essays. Ed. Ian Watt. Englewood Cliffs, NJ: Prentice-Hall, 1963.
- Honan, Park. Jane Austen: A Life. New York: St. Martin's Press, 1987. ISBN 0-312-01451-1.
- Irvine, Robert Jane Austen. London: Routledge, 2005. ISBN 0-415-31435-6
- Jenkyns, Richard. A Fine Brush on Ivory: An Appreciation of Jane Austen. Oxford: Oxford University Press, 2004. ISBN 0-19-927661-7.
- Johnson, Claudia. "Austen cults and cultures". The Cambridge Companion to Jane Austen. Eds. Edward Copeland and Juliet McMaster. Cambridge: Cambridge University Press, 2014. ISBN 978-0-521-74650-2. 232–247.
- Kelly, Gary. "Education and accomplishments". Jane Austen in Context. Ed. Janet Todd. Cambridge: Cambridge University Press, 2005. ISBN 0-521-82644-6. 252–259
- Keymer, Thomas. "Northanger Abbey and Sense and Sensibility". The Cambridge Companion to Jane Austen. Eds. Edward Copeland and Juliet McMaster. Cambridge: Cambridge University Press, 2014. ISBN 978-0-521-74650-2. 21–38
- Kirkham, Margaret. "Portraits". Jane Austen in Context. Ed. Janet Todd. Cambridge: Cambridge University Press, 2005. ISBN 0-521-82644-6. 68–82
- Lascelles, Mary. Jane Austen and Her Art. Oxford: Oxford University Press, 1966 [1939].
- Lane, Maggie. Jane Austen and Food. London: The Hambledon Press, 1995.
- Leavis, F.R. The Great Tradition: George Eliot, Henry James, Joseph Conrad. London: Chatto & Windus, 1960.
- Le Faye, Deirdre, ed. Jane Austen's Letters. Oxford: Oxford University Press, 1995. ISBN 0-19-283297-2.
- Le Faye, Deirdre. "Chronology of Jane Austen's Life". The Cambridge Companion to Jane Austen. Eds. Edward Copeland and Juliet McMaster. Cambridge: Cambridge University Press, 2014. ISBN 978-0-521-74650-2. xv–xxvi
- Le Faye, Deirdre. Jane Austen: The World of Her Novels. New York: Harry N. Abrams, 2002. ISBN 0-8109-3285-7.
- Le Faye, Deirdre. Jane Austen: A Family Record. Second Edition. Cambridge: Cambridge University Press, 2004. ISBN 0-521-53417-8.
- Le Faye, Deirdre. "Letters". Jane Austen in Context. Ed. Janet Todd. Cambridge: Cambridge University Press, 2005. ISBN 0-521-82644-6. 33–40
- Le Faye, "Memoirs and Biographies". Jane Austen in Context. Ed. Janet Todd. Cambridge: Cambridge University Press, 2005. ISBN 0-521-82644-6. 51–58
- Litz, A. Walton. Jane Austen: A Study of Her Development. New York: Oxford University Press, 1965.
- Litz, A. Walton. "Chronology of Composition". The Jane Austen Companion. Ed. J. David Grey. New York: Macmillan, 1986. ISBN 0-02-545540-0. 47–62
- Lodge, David. "Jane Austen's Novels: Form and Structure". The Jane Austen Companion. Ed. J. David Grey. New York: Macmillan, 1986. ISBN 0-02-545540-0. 165–179
- Looser, Devoney. The Making of Jane Austen. Baltimore, MD: Johns Hopkins University Press, 2017. ISBN 1-4214-2282-4.
- Lynch, Deirdre Shauna. "Sequels". Jane Austen in Context. Ed. Janet Todd. Cambridge: Cambridge University Press, 2005. ISBN 0-521-82644-6. 160–169
- MacDonagh, Oliver. Jane Austen: Real and Imagined Worlds. New Haven: Yale University Press, 1991. ISBN 0-300-05084-4.
- McMaster, Juliet. "Education". The Jane Austen Companion. Ed. J. David Grey. New York: Macmillan Publishing Company, 1986. ISBN 0-02-545540-0. 140–142
- Miller, D.A. Jane Austen, or The Secret of Style. Princeton: Princeton University Press, 2003. ISBN 0-691-12387-X.
- Nokes, David. Jane Austen: A Life. Berkeley: University of California Press, 1998. ISBN 0-520-21606-7.
- Page, Norman. The Language of Jane Austen. Oxford: Blackwell, 1972. ISBN 0-631-08280-8.
- Polhemus, Robert M. "Jane Austen's Comedy". The Jane Austen Companion. Ed. J. David Grey. New York: Macmillan, 1986. ISBN 0-02-545540-0. 60–71
- Raven, James. "Book Production". Jane Austen in Context. Ed. Janet Todd. Cambridge: Cambridge University Press, 2005. ISBN 0-521-82644-6. 194–203
- Raven, James. The Business of Books: Booksellers and the English Book Trade. New Haven: Yale University Press, 2007. ISBN 0-300-12261-6.
- Rajan, Rajeswari. "Critical Responses, Recent". Jane Austen in Context. Ed. Janet Todd. Cambridge: Cambridge University Press, 2005. ISBN 0-521-82644-6. 101–10.
- Scott, Walter. "Walter Scott, an unsigned review of Emma, Quarterly Review". Jane Austen: The Critical Heritage, 1812–1870. Ed. B.C. Southam. London: Routledge and Kegan Paul, 1968. ISBN 0-7100-2942-X. 58–69.
- Southam, B.C. "Grandison". The Jane Austen Companion. Ed. J. David Grey. New York: Macmillan, 1986. ISBN 0-02-545540-0. 187–189
- Southam, B.C. "Criticism, 1870–1940". The Jane Austen Companion. Ed. J. David Grey. New York: Macmillan, 1986. ISBN 0-02-545540-0. 102–109
- Southam, B.C., ed. Jane Austen: The Critical Heritage, 1812–1870. Vol. 1. London: Routledge and Kegan Paul, 1968. ISBN 0-7100-2942-X.
- Southam, B.C., ed. Jane Austen: The Critical Heritage, 1870–1940. Vol. 2. London: Routledge and Kegan Paul, 1987. ISBN 0-7102-0189-3.
- Southam, B.C. "Juvenilia". The Jane Austen Companion. Ed. J. David Grey. New York: Macmillan, 1986. ISBN 0-02-545540-0. 244–255
- Stovel, Bruce. "Further reading". The Cambridge Companion to Jane Austen. Eds. Edward Copeland and Juliet McMaster. Cambridge: Cambridge University Press, 2014. ISBN 978-0-521-74650-2. 248–266.
- Sutherland, Kathryn. "Chronology of composition and publication". Jane Austen in Context. Ed. Janet Todd. Cambridge: Cambridge University Press, 2005. ISBN 0-521-82644-6. 12–22
- Todd, Janet, ed. Jane Austen in Context. Cambridge: Cambridge University Press, 2005. ISBN 0-521-82644-6.
- Todd, Janet. The Cambridge Introduction to Jane Austen. Cambridge: Cambridge University Press, 2015. ISBN 978-1-107-49470-1.
- Tomalin, Claire. Jane Austen: A Life. New York: Alfred A. Knopf, 1997. ISBN 0-679-44628-1.
- Troost, Linda. "The Nineteenth-Century Novel on Film". The Cambridge Companion to Literature on Screen. Eds. Deborah Cartmell and Imelda Whelehan. Cambridge: Cambridge University Press, 2007. ISBN 978-0-521-84962-3. 75–89
- Trott, Nicola. "Critical Responess, 1830–1970", Jane Austen in Context. Ed. Janet Todd. Cambridge: Cambridge University Press, 2005. ISBN 0-521-82644-6. 92–100
- Tucker, George Holbert. "Amateur Theatricals at Steventon". The Jane Austen Companion. Ed. J. David Grey. New York: Macmillan, 1986. ISBN 0-02-545540-0. 1–4
- Tucker, George Holbert. "Jane Austen's Family". The Jane Austen Companion. Ed. J. David Grey. New York: Macmillan, 1986. ISBN 0-02-545540-0. 143–153
- Waldron, Mary. "Critical Response, early". Jane Austen in Context. Ed. Janet Todd. Cambridge: Cambridge University Press, 2005. ISBN 0-521-82644-6. 83–91
- Watt, Ian. "Introduction". Jane Austen: A Collection of Critical Essays. Ed. Ian Watt. Englewood Cliffs, NJ: Prentice Hall, 1963.
- Watt, Ian, ed. Jane Austen: A Collection of Critical Essays. Englewood Cliffs, NJ: Prentice Hall, 1963.
- Wiltshire, John. Jane Austen and the Body: The Picture of Health. Cambridge: Cambridge University Press, 1992. ISBN 0-521-41476-8.
