= Steventon =

Steventon may refer to:

- Steventon, Hampshire, England
- Steventon, Oxfordshire (formerly Berkshire), England
- Steventon, Shropshire, England

== See also ==
- Stevenston, Scotland
