= Quidhampton =

Quidhampton may refer to two places in England:

- Quidhampton, Hampshire
- Quidhampton, Wiltshire
