= North Waltham =

Village and parish in Hampshire, England

Coordinates: 51.2113°N 1.1940°W

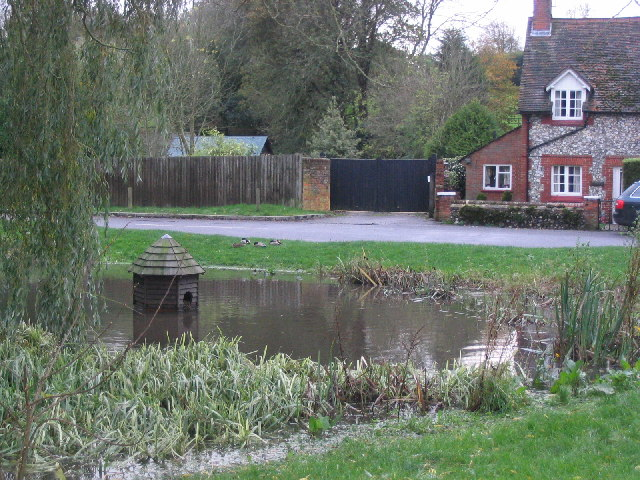
- Village pond

- Location within Hampshire
- Population: 840
- OS grid reference: SU564461
- Civil parish: North Waltham
- District: Basingstoke and Deane
- Shire county: Hampshire
- Region: South East
- Country: England
- Sovereign state: United Kingdom
- Post town: BASINGSTOKE
- Postcode district: RG25
- Dialling code: 01256
- Police: Hampshire and Isle of Wight
- Fire: Hampshire and Isle of Wight
- Ambulance: South Central
- UK Parliament: Basingstoke

North Waltham is a village and civil parish in the borough of Basingstoke and Deane in Hampshire, England. It is located around 6 miles (9.7 km) southwest of Basingstoke and just 2.7 miles from junction 7 of the M3 motorway. In the 2011 Census it had a population of 870. The village is home to a pond, shop, Victorian primary school, a recreation ground and two pubs: The Fox, and The Wheatsheaf. The Church of England Parish Church, dedicated to St Michael is medieval in origin, though much restored in 1866.

== Governance ==
The village and civil parish are part of the Oakley and North Waltham ward of the borough of Basingstoke and Deane. In turn, the ward falls within the North West Hampshire constituency.

== Geography ==
Nearby towns and cities: Andover, Basingstoke, Newbury, Salisbury, Winchester

Nearby villages: Axford, Cliddesden, Dummer, Farleigh Wallop, Hook, Kingsclere, Oakley, Old Basing, Overton, Steventon.
