= Oakley railway station (Hampshire) =

Former railway station in England

Oakley
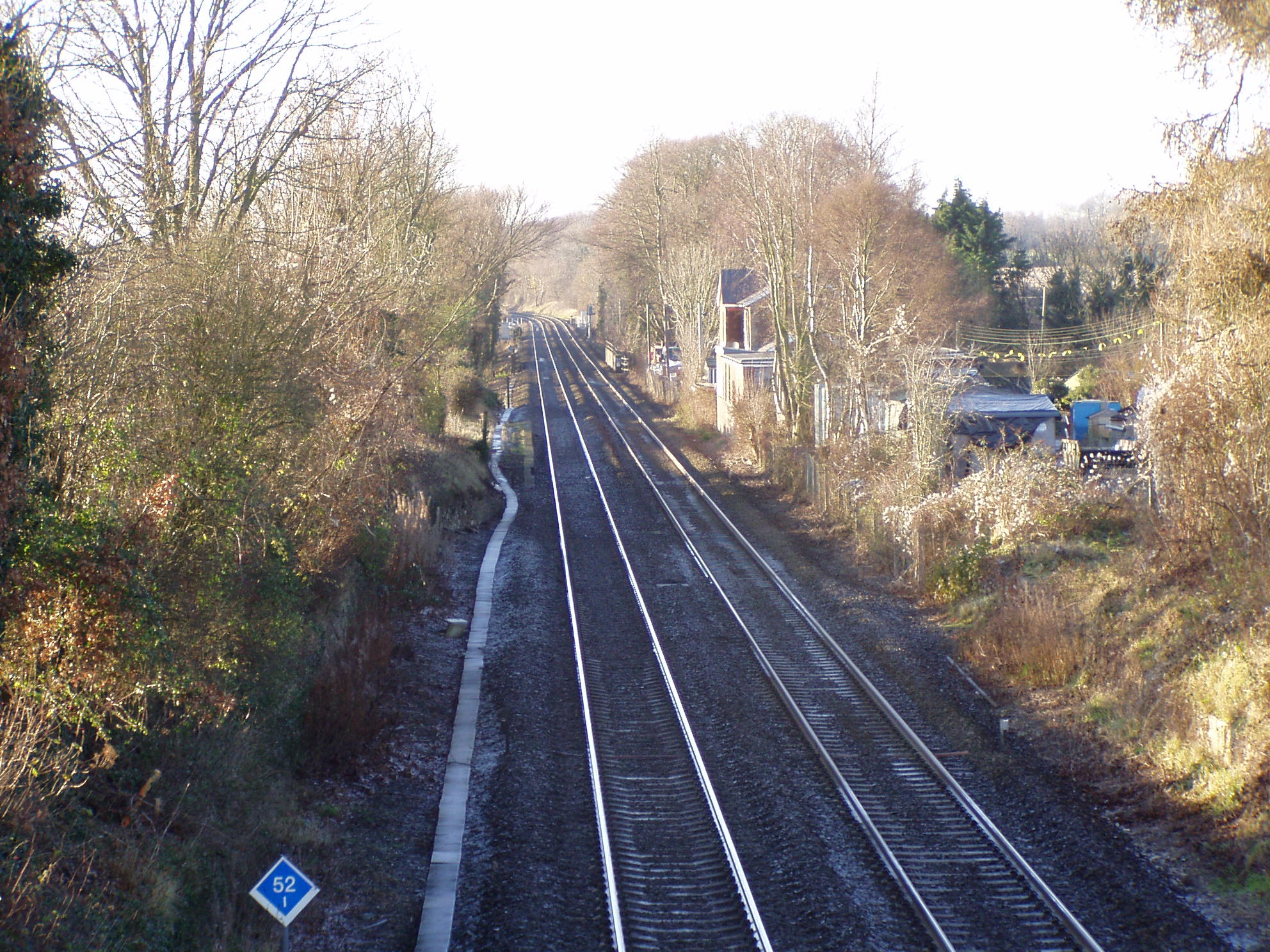
- Oakley railway station, old station buildings on right in middle distance.

General information
- Location: Oakley, Basingstoke and Deane, Hampshire; England
- Coordinates: 51.2550°N 1.1880°W
- Grid reference: SU570509
- Platforms: 2

Other information
- Status: Disused

History
- Original company: LSWR
- Pre-grouping: LSWR
- Post-grouping: Southern Railway; Southern Region of British Railways

Key dates
- 3 July 1854: Opened
- 17 June 1963: Closed
Location

Oakley was a railway station on the West of England Main Line in Hampshire, England which served the village of Oakley.

== History ==
The station was opened on 3 July 1854 by the London & South Western Railway. It closed on 17 June 1963.

Preceding station	Disused railways	Following station
Basingstoke	Southern Railway; West of England Main Line	Overton
