= William Diaper =

English clergyman, poet and translator

The Reverend William Diaper
- Province: Canterbury
- Diocese: Bath and Wells

Orders
- Ordination: Deacon (1709)

Personal details
- Born: 1685 Bridgwater, Somerset, England
- Died: 1717 (aged 31/32) Deane, Hampshire, England
- Denomination: Anglican
- Education: Balliol College, Oxford: BA (1705)

William Diaper (1685–1717) was an English clergyman, poet and translator of the Augustan era. Having taken the wrong political side at a time of regime change, he lost the patrons who were advancing his career and died in obscurity shortly afterwards.

== Life ==
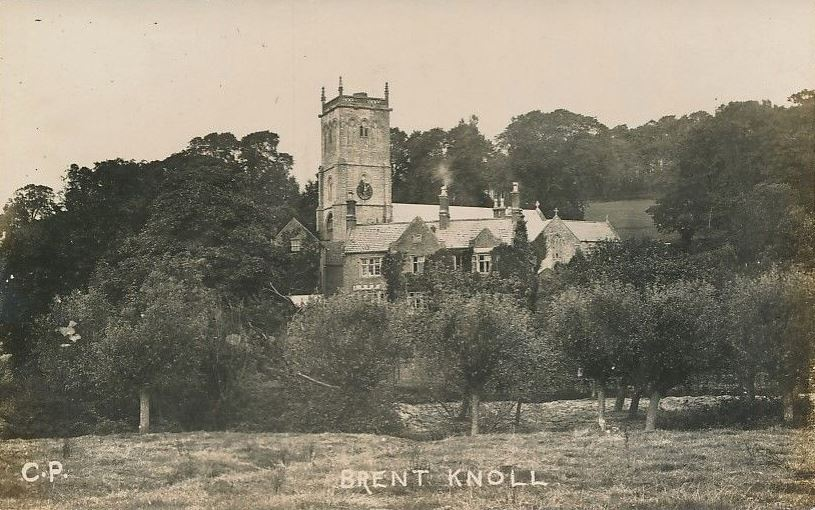
A turn-of-the-century postcard of Brent Knoll church and village

Biographical details for William Diaper are sparse. He was born in Bridgwater, the son of Joseph Diaper, and attended Balliol College, Oxford in 1699 as a poor scholar (pauper puer), and took his BA degree in 1705. In 1709 he was ordained as a deacon and became a curate in the parish of Brent Knoll, overlooking the Somerset Levels, which he made the subject of his humorous first poem. His next set of poems, the innovative Nereides, or Sea-Eclogues, was published in 1712 and earned him entry into the London literary world.

In particular Diaper came to the notice of Jonathan Swift, who mentions the poet at this time in his A Journal to Stella. In March 1712 he reported: "Here is a young fellow has writ some Sea Eclogues, poems of Mermen, resembling pastorals of shepherds, and they are very pretty, and the thought is new... I must do something for him, and get him out of the way. I hate to have any new wits rise, but when they do rise I would encourage them; but they tread on our heels and thrust us off the stage." In December he introduced Diaper and his new poem to the politician Henry St John and to the Somerset Member of Parliament William Wyndham through their Society of Brothers. Also referred to by Swift as the Brothers’ Club, it represented Tory opinion at ministerial level and included as another poet Matthew Prior. Swift described Diaper at this time as "a poor little short wretch" for whom he hoped to arrange ordination. Then in the following month he went to see Diaper "in a nasty garret, very sick" and gave him twenty guineas from his new patrons.

During his stay in London, Diaper was trying to establish his literary reputation in other ways too. He collaborated with a group of authors in translating the Neo-Latin poem Callipaedea or the Art of getting beautiful Children by the physician Claude Quillet (1602–61), sharing the translation of its fourth book with Samuel Cobb. He also espoused the Tory politics of his new friends and celebrated the Treaty of Utrecht in his poem "Dryades, or the nymphs prophecy" (1713). Thanks to the support of his patrons, Diaper moved on to become curate at Deane, Hampshire, and also at Crick, Northamptonshire, by 1714. In that year he dedicated his "Imitation of the Seventeenth Epistle of the First Book of Horace" to Swift and refers to his Hampshire parsonage there.

However, the Tory ministry on which he depended collapsed soon after and, with the accession of George I to the throne and the new administration that supported him, all further hope of advancement disappeared. Meanwhile, Diaper had begun a translation project on his own account, taking up another marine theme in the Halieutica, a didactic poem on sea-fishing by Oppian. He was still in ill health, however, and died by 1717, having only translated the first two books. The work was completed by John Jones, a fellow from his old college, and published by the university in 1722.

== Reputation ==
During the course of the 18th century, Diaper's work was not wholly forgotten, despite his early death. Swift's friend Alexander Pope, less impressed by Diaper's poetical abilities, included him in the diving episode in the 1728 version of The Dunciad:

Far worse unhappy D[iape]r succeeds,
He search’d for coral, but he gather'd weeds.

Perhaps due to Swift's intervention, however, this mention disappeared from later revised editions of the poem. It must be admitted, though, that Diaper was republished later only in obscure 18th-century miscellanies: "The Dryades" in The Poetical Calendar (1763), and the Nereides in John Nichols’ A Select Collection of Poems (1782). The satirical "Brent" was not published at all during Diaper's lifetime and, when it was, not always under that title. But it was well enough known for passages from it to be interpolated as illustration of a point by the translator of Travels of the Jesuits (1767).

Diaper's late appearance in John Nichols’ Select Collection was owing to the enthusiasm of Joseph Warton, but all this was not enough to save his name from oblivion for the next century and a half. Samuel Johnson did not include him in Lives of the Poets (1779–81), nor did Diaper appear in the Dictionary of National Biography (1885–1900). Henry Marion Hall included consideration of Diaper's Nereides in his monograph Idylls of Fishermen (Columbia University, 1912), claiming them as "piscatory eclogues" in a genre descending from Idyll XXI of Theocritus, a claim disputed by Diaper's eventual editor. This came about after the poet's reputation was revived in the mid-20th century by the critic Geoffrey Grigson, who devoted an enthusiastic radio talk to Diaper and later included it in his book of essays, The Harp of Aeolus (1947). As a result of his suggestion, the subsequent edition of Diaper's poems was published in 1952. Thereafter critical studies began to be devoted to his work and a later poetical tribute by George Szirtes, "Airs for William Diaper", celebrating his writing on fish, was included in Szirtes’ New and Collected Poems (2008).

== Poetry ==
Almost all of Diaper's poetry was written in the pastoral mode, although his approach was always innovative. The versification, on the other hand, was standard for Augustan times: 10-syllabled heroic couplets occasionally varied by triple rhymes or an alexandrine. Probably his earliest poem (although only published posthumously) was his satirical description of "Brent", the place of his first curacy. It is dedicated to the Bridgwater MP Thomas Palmer and has been described as an anti-pastoral. A reviewer later noted a likeness to Andrew Marvell’s paradoxical "The Character of Holland", which similarly opens with a description of a place where land and water are confounded. But in other ways the poem disrupts the generality of pastoral convention by insisting on local particularities. In place of "purling streams" there are the "rine" and "moory sink" found in local place names. Again, the Somerset Levels, undrained as yet, were subject to severe inundations from the sea, of which those of 1696 and 1703 fell during Diaper's lifetime. These too, dressed in suitably mock-heroic garb, find their place in the poem,

As when of late enraged Neptune sware,
Brent was his own Part of his lawful Share;
He said, and held his Trident o’er the Plain.

This was a time when authors were seeking to go beyond slavish adherence to Classical models and, among other strategies of renewal, were injecting into them details of contemporary urban existence. One example was the "Town Eclogue", the work of Swift and his Society of Brothers, that was published in the Tatler in 1710, signed only by the initials L.B., W.H., J.S., S.T. It is little wonder that Swift welcomed the inventive approach in Diaper's Nereides, or Sea-Eclogues and seemed to foresee his own displacement by a new generation. Diaper's recipe for renewal was simply to move "a variety of pastoral episodes modelled closely on Theocritus and Virgil" from dry land to the sea, making the interlocutors sea-gods and sea-nymphs. "We know", Diaper reasons in his preface, "that the agreeable Images, which may be drawn from things on Earth, have been long since exhausted, but it will be allow’d that the Beauties (as well as the Riches) of the Sea are yet in a great Measure untouch’d."

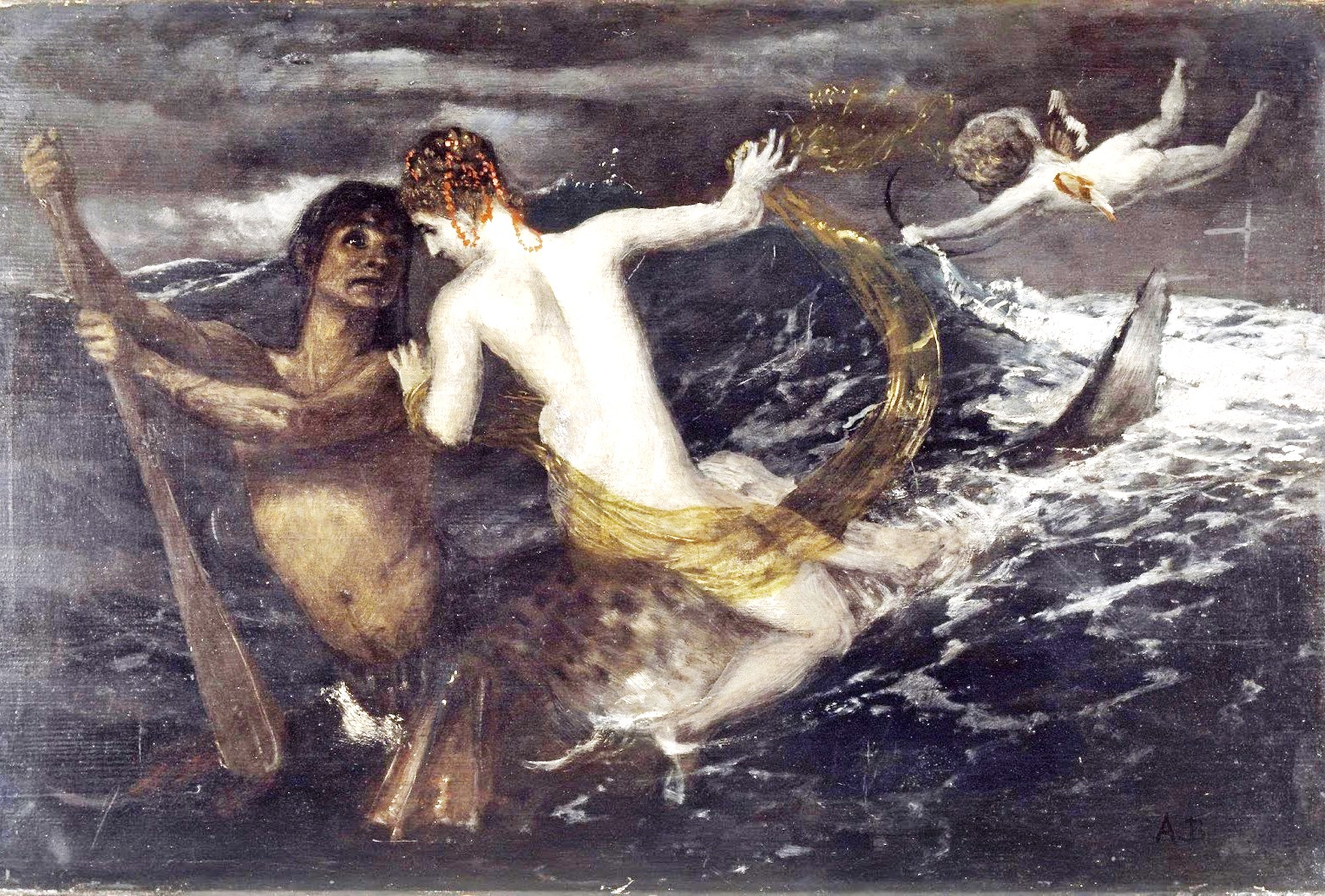
Arnold Böcklin's amatory Triton and Nereid, 1875

"Eclogue IV" is therefore a conscious extension of the Classical pastoral. Where that had portrayed the desirable leisure of an eternal Arcadian summer, Diaper's characters contrast the clement conditions undersea with the unstable English climate above the surface. "Eclogue XII" goes on to contrast the fisherman's lot favourably to the herdsman's life idealised in Classical pastoral. Other themes are drawn directly from Theocritus and Virgil, only transposing them to the new marine environment. In addition, marine natural history is drawn on as a novel source of imagery to such an extent that it has led to the suggestion that Diaper was drawing on Oppian's Halieutica well before he made it a translation project.

A patriotic theme strays into Diaper's eclogues only once: in the praise of Lacon with which "Eclogue XII" closes. The admiral of the English navy mentioned under that name has been identified with John Leake, who had recently been elected a Member of Parliament and contrived to make himself useful to both the Whig and succeeding Tory ministries. Diaper himself espoused the Tory politics of his patrons more directly in "Dryades, or the nymphs prophecy", which was published soon after his eclogues. Among its medley of themes is praise of those who ended English participation in the War of the Spanish Succession. Those responsible who are specifically named in the poem are Bolingbroke, Robert Harley, recently created Earl of Oxford, Matthew Prior (identified as he "Who once of Henry sung, and Emma's Love") and William Wyndham, to whom the poem is dedicated at the end. The uneasy mixture in this poem of Classical and faery lore, sociology and science as seen thru the microscope, earned it the description of "a philosophical poem" when it was posthumously reprinted in The Poetical Calendar. It has also been argued that Pope showed awareness of the poem's faery lore when he came to expand The Rape of the Lock in 1714.

Diaper's last original poem was "An imitation of the seventeenth epistle of the first book of Horace, address'd to Dr. Swift" (1714), composed in reply to Swift's own imitation of Horace's seventh epistle in which he had complained of the burden of the client-benefactor relationship. Diaper's poem is original in that it is more dependent on Swift's imitation for context than it is on Horace's satirical (if not morally dubious) advice on how to exploit a patron. The dependence was further underlined when John Nichols included the poem in his Supplement to Dr. Swift's Works (1779) in a section of "Poems by Dr Swift and his friends". But though Diaper departs his usual form for the octosyllabic couplets of Swift's model, the voice he adopts is still recognisably his own, balancing there the sharp humour evident in "Brent" and parts of the Nereides and identification with the interests of the Tory Ministry.

There is also more than simply continuity of interest in the marine subject matter that Diaper had made his own in his version of the Halieuticks. As John Jones noted in his preface to the completed work, "He has somewhat paraphrased the Author…The Richness of his Fancy and copious Expression maintain the Character and Spirit of Oppian, even while he recedes from the Letter of the Original" (p. 13). One example of this appears in the extended image from the end of the first book, referring to the shoals of the "Slime-Fish":

As when soft Snows, brought down by Western Gales,
Silent descend and spread on all the Vales;
Add to the Plains, and on the Mountains shine,
While in chang'd Fields the starving Cattle pine;
Nature bears all one Face, looks coldly bright,
And mourns her lost Variety in White,
Unlike themselves the Objects glare around,
And with false Rays the dazzled Sight confound:
So, where the Shoal appears, the changing Streams
Lose their Sky-blew, and shine with silver Gleams."

That most is of Diaper's own invention and mediates away from the mythical allusions in the original can be seen by comparing it with a prose translation of Oppian's Greek: "As when the swift might of Zephyrus from the West shadows with snow-flakes a spacious garden and nothing of the dark earth appears to the eye, but all is white and covered with snow on snow; even so in that season, full to overflowing with the infinite shoals of Fry, white shines the garden of Poseidon."

It was in performances like this that Geoffrey Grigson identified Diaper's capacity for original observation so sharply in contrast to the derivative generalities of the age. "There is not so much writing of that order…at any time, and in Diaper’s time especially." But precisely because it conflicted with contemporary aesthetics, its skilful and imaginative nature had a long time to wait for rediscovery.

== Bibliography ==
- The Complete Works of William Diaper, edited, with an introduction, by Dorothy Broughton (London: Routledge and Kegan Paul, 1952)
- Greene, Richard. "William Diaper", in Matthew, H. C. G. and Brian Harrison, eds. The Oxford Dictionary of National Biography. 16. (London: Oxford University Press, 2004), pp. 21–2
- Grigson, Geoffrey. "William Diaper, an unknown poet", in The Harp of Aeolus and other Essays (London: Routledge, 1947), pp. 1–12
- Swift, Jonathan. Journal to Stella, edited, with an introduction and notes, by George A. Aitken (London: Methuen & Co., 1901)
