= William Beach (British politician) =

British politician

William Beach (24 July 1783 – 22 November 1856), of Oakley Hall, Hampshire and Keevil, Wiltshire, was a British politician. From 1790 to 1833 he was known as William Hicks Beach.

== Biography ==
He was born William Hicks, second son of Michael Hicks of Beverston Castle and Williamstrip Park, Gloucestershire, and his wife Henrietta Maria, only daughter of William Beach of Netheravon, Wiltshire. On 23 June 1790 his father adopted the additional name and arms of Beach. Hicks Beach sat in Parliament for Malmesbury from 1812 to 1817; his father was MP for Cirencester at the same time. On 24 June 1838 Hicks Beach assumed the name of Beach only, by Royal Licence.

Hicks Beach was married on 1 February 1826 to Jane Henrietta, daughter of John Browne of Salperton, Gloucestershire. They had three children: William Wither Bramston Beach (1826–1901), also an MP; Mary Jane (died 4 November 1903), who married Sir Wyndham Spencer Portal, 1st Baronet; and Henrietta Maria (died 26 October 1905), who married Colonel Sir John Williams Wallington KCB. His wife died on 11 August 1831.
