= CarFest =

Music and motoring festival in England

- Status: Active
- Genre: Family festival
- Frequency: Annually
- Venue: Bolesworth Estate, Cheshire, England; Laverstoke Park Farm, Hampshire, England
- Country: England
- Inaugurated: August 2011
- Founder: Chris Evans

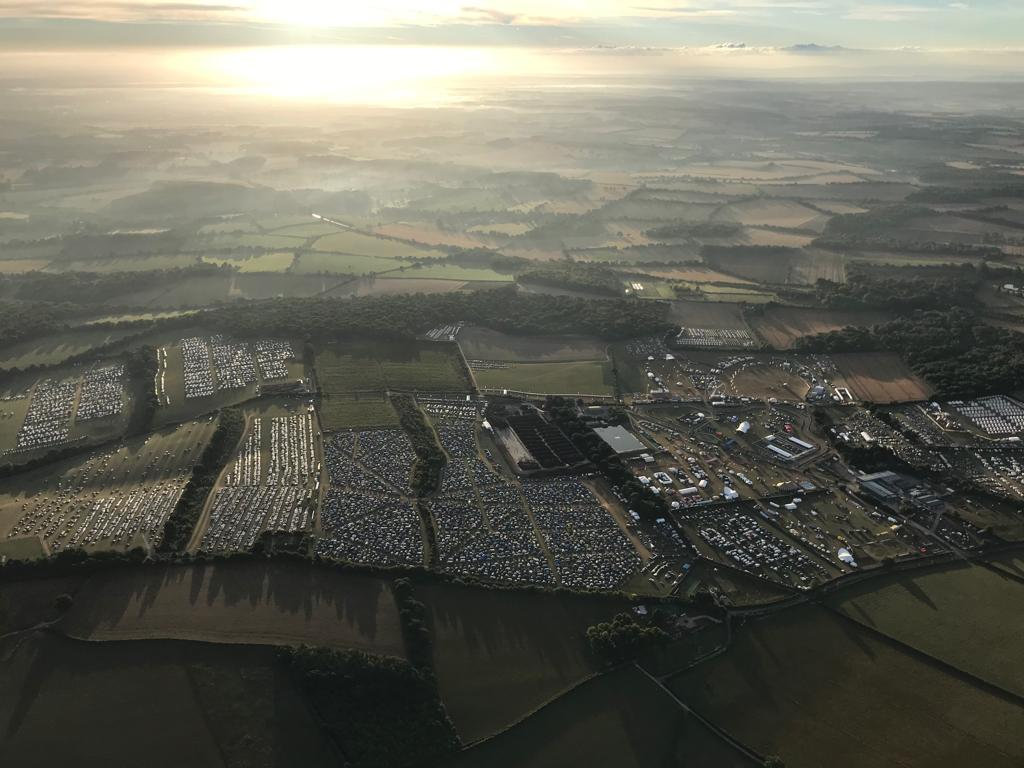
CarFest South 2022

CarFest or (C4R-FEST) is an annual family music and motoring festival held in Cheshire and Hampshire, England. It was founded by the radio presenter Chris Evans in 2012, and raises funds for Children in Need, a British charity. The festival presents a variety of entertainment - live music performances, track shows, celebrity chef demos, driving experiences, a steam fair, a fundraising family fun run and a carnival fancy dress parade.

== Dates ==
Both events have taken place annually since 2012, with the exception of 2020 when they were cancelled due to COVID-19. The North event has been held at 3 locations throughout Cheshire, including Cholmondeley Castle, Oulton Park, and the Bolesworth Estate, with the South event being held at Laverstoke Park Farm in Overton, Hampshire every year since its debut until 2026 when the South event was moved to the Silverstone Circuit, Towcester.

2022 was the last year that CarFest North took place at the Bolesworth estate, with a focus to making one main annual event at Laverstoke Park.

Year	CarFest North	CarFest South
2012	8-9 September (held at Cholmondeley Castle)	25-26 August
2013	2-4 August (held at Oulton Park)	23-25 August
2014	1-3 August (held at Oulton Park)	22-24 August
2015	31 July-2 August (held at Oulton Park)	28-30 August
2016	29-31 July (held at Bolesworth Estate)	26-28 August
2017	28-30 July (held at Bolesworth Estate)	25-27 August
2018	27-29 July (held at Bolesworth Estate)	24-26 August
2019	26-28 July (held at Bolesworth Estate)	23-25 August
2020	Cancelled due to Covid-19	Cancelled due to Covid-19
2021	23-25 July (held at Bolesworth Estate)	27-29 August
2022	22-24 July (held at Bolesworth Estate)	26-28 August
2023	-	25-27 August
2024	-	23-25 August
2025	-	22-24 August
2026	-	28-30 August (held at the Silverstone Circuit)

== Scalextric ==
For the 2015 CarFest South, former F1 driver Martin Brundle created a 45-metre Scalextric circuit.

== Air crash ==
During the 2015 event, held at Oulton Park, Cheshire, a Folland Gnat aircraft, one of pair performing a display, crashed into the ground, killing the pilot, Kevin Whyman.

== CarFest Supergroup ==
Richard Jones of The Feeling put together the CarFest Supergroup, on behalf of Evans, who released a live double album for the 10th anniversary of the music and motoring festival, with the profits going to a number of charities including the Teenage Cancer Trust and the Starlight Children's Foundation. Musicians on the album include Roger Daltrey, KT Tunstall, Gary Kemp, Ricky Wilson and Jones' wife Sophie Ellis-Bextor.

== Break from Brand Events ==
In 2022, Brand Events, who previously organised the CarFest event for 11 years, moved away from the venture and CarFest Management was set up.
