= Ashe, Hampshire =

Village and parish in Hampshire, England

Coordinates: 51.2457°N 1.2354°W

Ashe
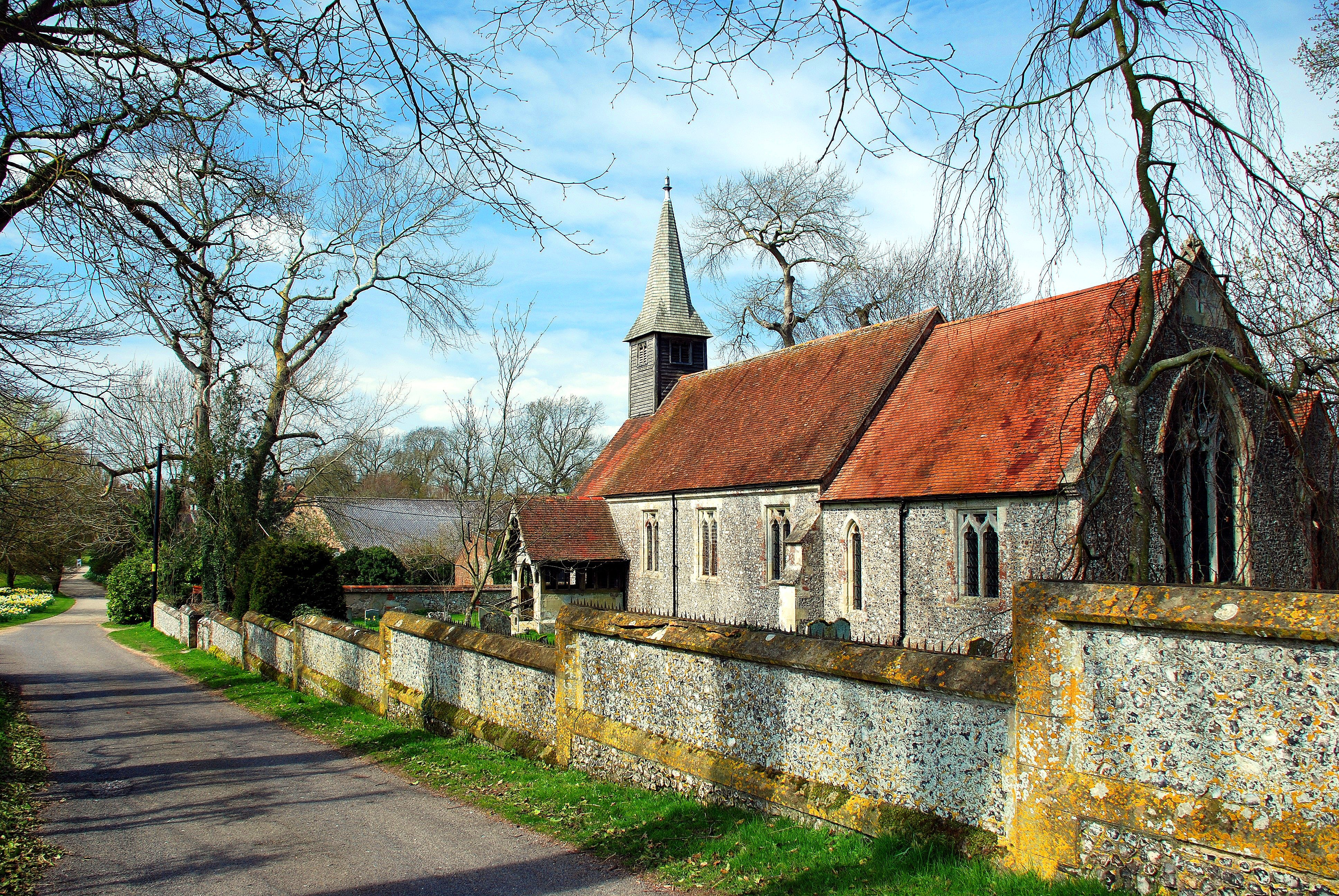
- Holy Trinity parish church

- Location within Hampshire
- OS grid reference: SU534499
- Civil parish: Overton
- District: Basingstoke and Deane
- Shire county: Hampshire
- Region: South East
- Country: England
- Sovereign state: United Kingdom
- Post town: Basingstoke
- Postcode district: RG25
- Dialling code: 01256
- Police: Hampshire and Isle of Wight
- Fire: Hampshire and Isle of Wight
- Ambulance: South Central
- UK Parliament: North West Hampshire

Ashe is a village and former civil parish, now in the parish of Overton, in the Basingstoke and Deane district of Hampshire, England. The River Test commonly rises in the village. In 1931 the parish had a population of 174.

The Church of the Holy Trinity & St Andrew is a Grade II listed building. It was rebuilt on the site of an older church by George Gilbert Scott Jr. in 1878. The young Jane Austen, who was born in nearby Steventon, had connections to the village via the Lefroy family.

== Toponym ==
The name comes from "ac" or "ache", a Celtic name for a spring or water source.

== Governance ==
The village is part of the Overton, Laverstoke and Steventon ward of Basingstoke and Deane borough council. The borough council is a non-metropolitan district of Hampshire County Council.

On 1 April 1932 the parish was abolished and merged with Overton and Steventon.
