= Steventon, Hampshire =

Village and parish in Hampshire, England

Coordinates: 51.2303°N 1.2189°W

Steventon
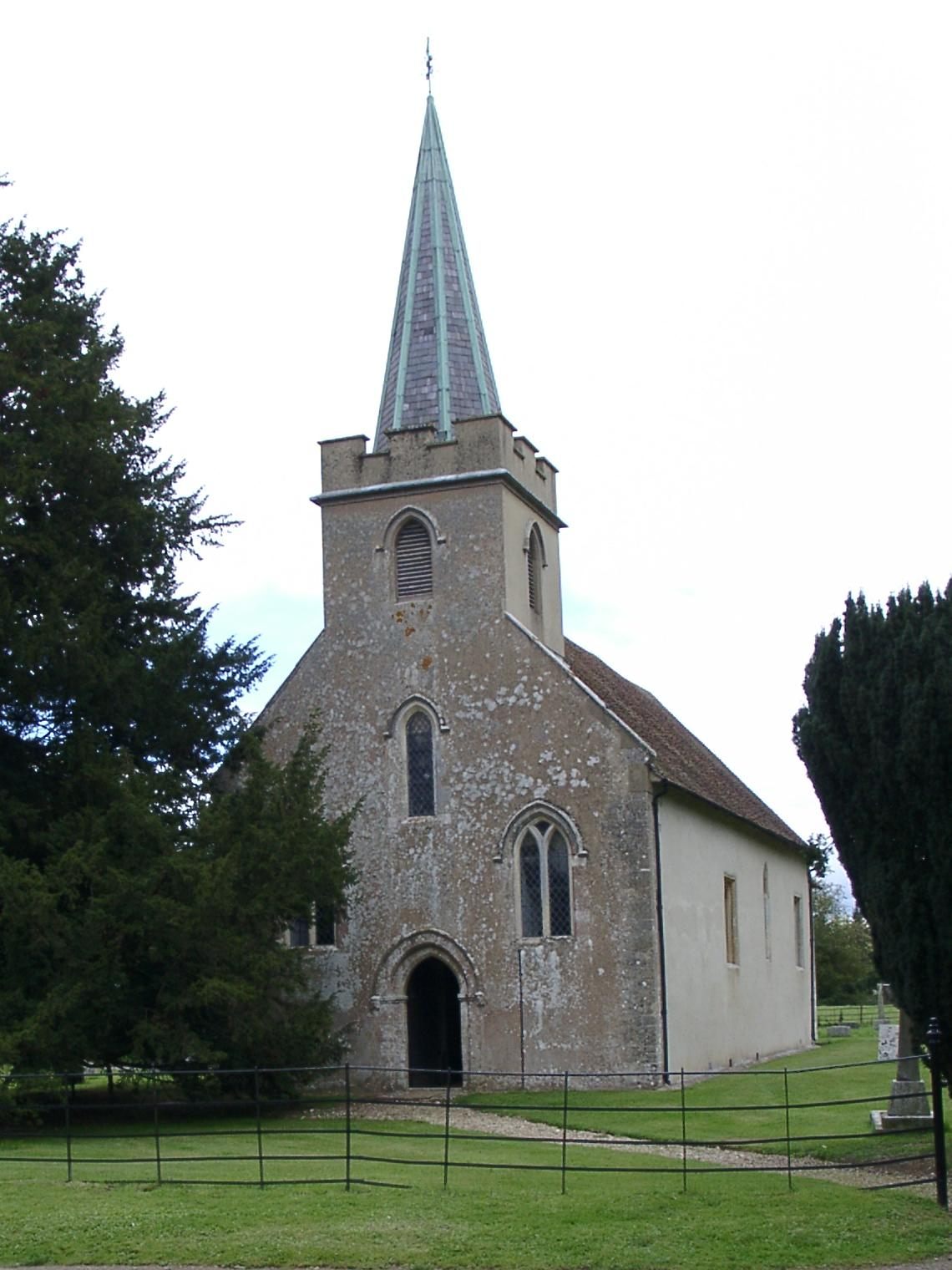
- Church of St Nicholas (Steventon Church)

- Location within Hampshire
- Population: 207 (2011 Census)
- Civil parish: Steventon
- District: Basingstoke and Deane
- Shire county: Hampshire
- Region: South East
- Country: England
- Sovereign state: United Kingdom
- Post town: Basingstoke
- Postcode district: RG25
- Police: Hampshire and Isle of Wight
- Fire: Hampshire and Isle of Wight
- Ambulance: South Central
- UK Parliament: North West Hampshire

Steventon is a village and a civil parish with a population of about 250 in north Hampshire, England. Situated 7 miles south-west of the town of Basingstoke, between the villages of Overton, Oakley and North Waltham, it is close to Junction 7 of the M3 motorway.

It was the birthplace of the author Jane Austen.

== History ==
The community is listed in the Domesday Book of 1086 as a manor, but a church is not mentioned.

Steventon is best known as the birthplace of the author Jane Austen, who lived there from 1775 to 1801, when she moved to Bath with her parents. Though the Rectory in which she wrote Pride and Prejudice, Northanger Abbey and Sense and Sensibility was pulled down around 1824, the site is still marked by an old lime tree that is believed to have been planted by her eldest brother, James, who took over the parish from his father. An excavation in 2011, directed by Debbie Charlton, of Archeo Briton, was able to find and map the site of the former rectory and recovered some artefacts. The site is also designated by a fenced area and a warning sign.

The 13th-century church of St Nicholas, where Jane's father was rector for 44 years and where Jane worshipped for 25 years, seems little changed from their day. (It is now one of four in the benefice of North Waltham, Steventon, Ashe and Deane.) Inside are memorial tablets to James Austen, his nephew William Knight and their families, together with the Digweeds who rented the Steventon Estate during the Austen-Knight period. Outside in the churchyard are their graves, together with those of later Lords of the Manor of Steventon. The church is a Grade II listed building, said to be from the 13th century with a few modifications made in the 17th century and a significant restoration in the 19th. A local history adds specifics: about restorations in 1934, 1975, 1984 and 1988. In the two recent efforts, the "roof and spire were completely renovated ... the interior of the church was renovated".

The Ash Park estate, six miles from Steventon Church, built in the 1600s, was frequently visited by Austen in the late 18th century. It was restored in 1934 by Col Sir John Humphery and additions were made in the 1950s but the building was nearly derelict by the 1990s. It was eventually restored and the grounds were re-landscaped; the property became a polo centre. A part of the current structure dates back to the original, but there have been various alterations since that time. Ashe Park is not a listed building.

Other architecture in the area associated in some manner with Austen includes Deane House (where Jane met Tom LeFroy), Ashe Rectory (home of the LeFroys), Oakley Hall (where she visited Wither and Mary Bramston), the railway viaduct and the Wheatsheaf Hotel (where she collected the mail). The home of her brother Edward Austen Knight, known as Chawton House, is roughly 16 mi (26 km) from Steventon.

The Victorian Steventon Manor (built in 1877), which replaced an early Norman building, was destroyed by fire in 1932. It was replaced by an Elizabethan manor, which was demolished in 1970 after being vandalised. The site is now covered by the M3 motorway.

== Governance ==
The village is a civil parish and part of the Overton, Laverstoke and Steventon ward of Basingstoke and Deane borough council. The borough council is a Non-metropolitan district of Hampshire County Council.
