= Jane Martha St. John =

British photographer (1801–1882)

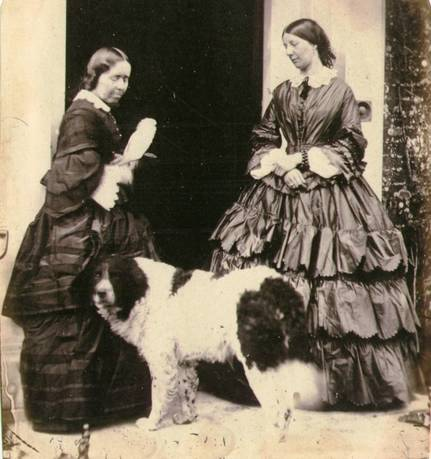
Jane Martha St. John and Julia, her sister-in-law (c. 1860)

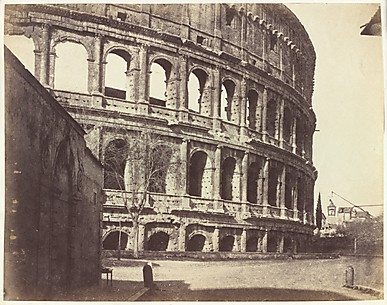
Jane Martha St. John late 1850s calotype of the Colosseum

Jane Martha St. John (née Hicks Beach, 1801–1882) was an early English photographer. She is remembered for her calotypes of Rome and other towns in Italy, now in the J. Paul Getty Museum and the Metropolitan Museum of Art.

St. John took over 100 photographs in the late 1850s when travelling with her husband in Italy. Her work included portraits, travel views, and scenes of the grounds of houses. The photographs of the Hotel des Étrangers in Naples and the view of the waterfront are remarkable for the period. Unlike her contemporaries, she was interested above all in capturing the scenes of her travels but her images were also carefully composed. This is particularly evident in her photograph of the Roman Colosseum with the adjacent Arch of Constantine. Her individual approach to her work makes St. John one of the more interesting amateur photographers of the mid-19th century.

== Biography ==
Jane Martha St. John was born Jane Martha Hicks Beach (not as has been mistakenly reported Jane Martha Beach) on 24 July 1801 at Williamstrip Park, Coln St. Aldwyn, Gloucestershire. She was the fourth daughter of Michael Hicks Beach (1760–1830), MP for Cirencester, and Henrietta Maria Beach (1760–1837). The family was particularly wealthy as her mother inherited large estates in Wiltshire as well as Williamstrip in Gloucestershire. In his will, Henrietta's father had stipulated that Michael should take the Beach name. As a result, in 1790 the name "Hicks Beach" came into being by Royal Licence.

By the time Jane Martha was nine, her three sisters and two of her brothers had died. Her brother Michael, 30, was married, and her brother William, 27, was MP for Marlborough, leaving Jane as the only child at home. When Jane Martha was 14, her brother Michael died of sunstroke while on holiday, leaving her mother with a daughter-in-law she apparently disliked. Jane Martha became protective of her mother as can be seen in her correspondence to her sister-in-law at the time, tactfully suggesting that she stay away from Williamstrip.

In 1832, their uncle, Wither Bramston, died, leaving his Oakley Hall estate in Hampshire to William who went to live there with his young family. Jane may have joined them there immediately or after Henrietta's death in 1837 to keep house and look after her brother's children.

Jane Martha became acquainted with Edward William St. John, 33, the only son of the Rev. Edward St. John and his wife Mary, from Ashe Park, an adjacent estate. On 24 February 1848, Jane Martha, then 47, and Edward were married at the Hicks Beach family seat of Williamstrip. The couple lived in Oakley Cottage on the Oakley Hall estate.

In the intervening years, cousin Emma Thomasina Talbot sent Jane copies of family photos taken by her husband, the pioneering photographer John Dillwyn Llewelyn. Emma had herself taken a keen interest in photography from the beginning and assisted her husband by printing for him.

When Jane Martha acquired a camera of her own in the 1850s, she sent her photos to friends and family. Some can be seen in the album of her cousin Emma Thomasina's daughter, Emma Charlotte (1837–1929), now in the Metropolitan Museum of Art. It was not until the late 1850s that Jane made a family album of her own which she used for the photos she received from others as well as those she took herself.

In the late 1850s, Jane and Edward had set off on a journey through France to Italy equipped with a camera and sensitised paper, where more than 100 times she positioned her camera to record the scenes that she liked most. Her album of that tour containing 106 of these Italian views is now in the J. Paul Getty Museum.

Jane Martha seems to have turned to neither her distant cousin Henry Fox Talbot nor her Welsh cousin Emma Thomasina's husband, John Dillwyn Llewelyn for help getting started in photography.

However she may had a mentor: Peter Wickens Fry. Fry, whose portrait appears on page one of her family album, was a pioneering amateur photographer who was involved in early experiments of the wet collodion process that Jane Martha used in later years.

Jane Martha died at Oakley on 18 November 1882 at age 81.

== Jane Martha St. John's family album ==
In 1992 an album of photographs was sold at an auction of furniture and chattels at Williamstrip Park, Gloucestershire. The album would turn out to be the personal family album of Jane Martha St. John, and has helped to fill in the many gaps in her biography.

A green Morocco bound album with a single gold tooled line to its edge with pages that are watermarked JOYNSON 1854 and measure approximately 225×197mm there are 96 photos arranged on 87 pages that are hand numbered 1 to 90 but with pages 23 and 40 missing (one is possibly in the Swansea Museum collection) and page 90 is unused.

The earliest are well known photos by John Dillwyn Llewelyn, dating from 1853; these were probably printed and sent to St. John by her cousin Emma Thomasina Talbot. Two others in a group of five taken at Williamstrip Park are dated by hand "May 1861" indicating they were taken around the time of the marriage of Caroline Julia Hicks Beach, her brother Michael's granddaughter, to John Talbot Dillwyn Llewelyn on 7 May 1861. It is not known if St. John took these five photos but she must surely have been in attendance at the family home on the occasion of her grandniece's marriage to her cousin Emma's first son, so it is most likely that she did.

There are a few formal portraits that are almost certainly not by St. John. The rest, mainly taken by St. John in the grounds of her home and perhaps a few in the locality, as well as those taken at Williamstrip Park, seem to date from between 1859 and 1866. In view of their similarity with the buildings today, 68 of the photos were clearly taken in the grounds of what used to be called by the family Oakley Cottage, now Oakley Manor, the home of Jane and Edward St. John.

The album was probably kept at Oakley Hall in Hampshire after the death of Edward St. John until 1931 when William Guy Hicks Beach (1891–1953), the great-grandson of Jane's brother, William, was declared bankrupt and the Oakley estate in total, inherited from his father Archibald seven years before, was sold to a speculator who promptly held sales of the contents. The family were given no notice but were able to buy some items back and it was probably then that the album came back to Jane's birthplace of Williamstrip Park in Gloucestershire, which is where it was found in 1992.

Someone in the family has tried to put names to some of the faces and record them in the album. From the titles and the formality of the names it is clear that this took place in the 20th century, possibly in the 1930s.

== Children and animals ==
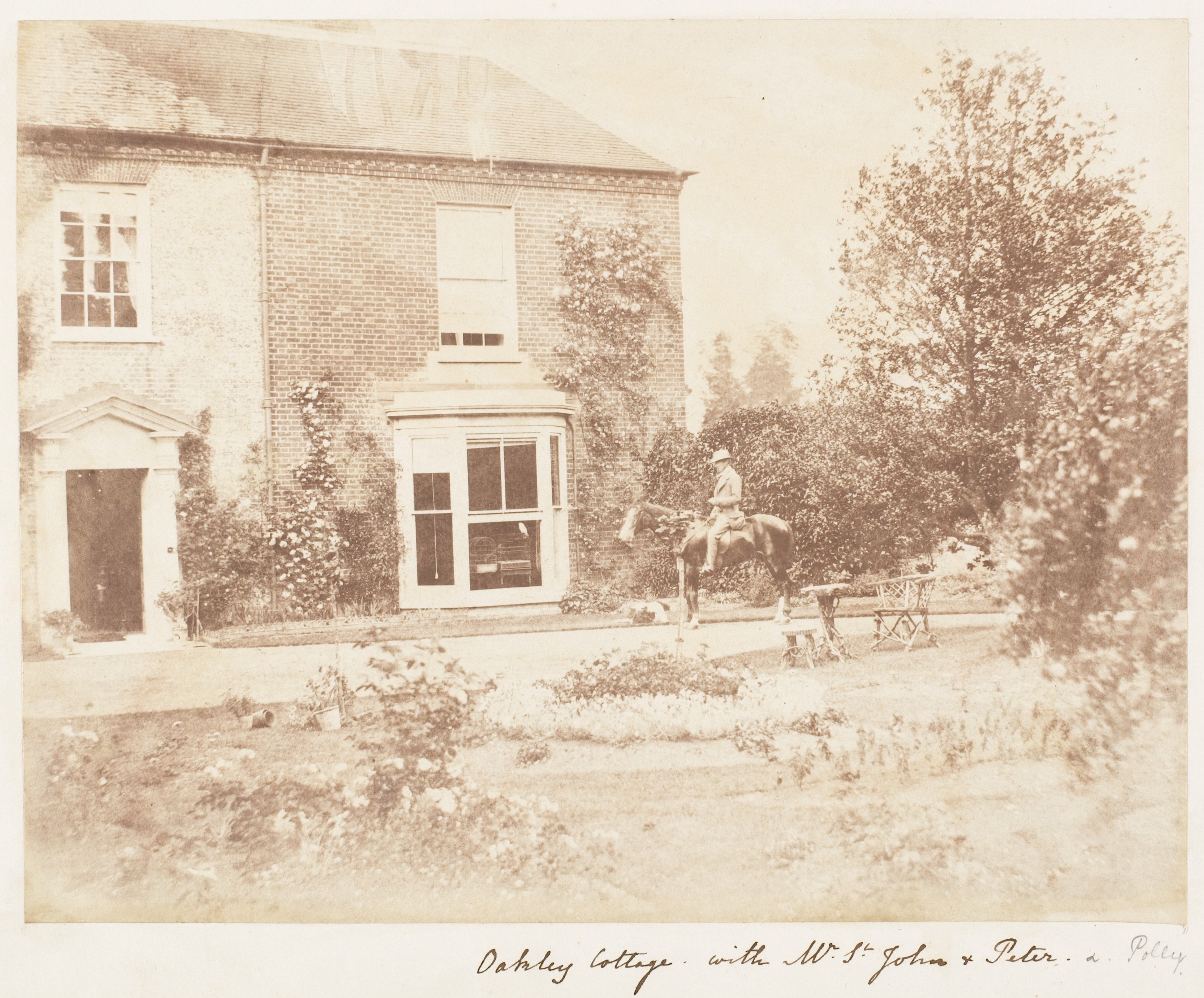
'Oakley Cottage with Mr. St. John, Peter and Polly' from the album of Emma Charlotte Dillwyn Llewelyn, circa 1853-56. (Currently in the collection of The Met, NYC)

Jane had no children of her own but through her siblings, was an aunt to many children. Across both the English and Welsh sides of the family and during her long life, she became known as 'Aunt Jane St. John', presumably to separate her from any other Aunt Jane in this very large family. She also enjoyed the challenge of photographing the children of her nieces and nephews as can be seen in her album.

Jane's family photos reveal her affinity for animals. Ponies, dogs, a goat, and a parrot named Polly all appeared to be both part of the household and welcome in photos. Jane was often photographed with her dog Peter, suggesting a particularly close bond between the two.

== Published work on Jane Martha St. John ==
In Impressed by Light: British Photographers from Paper Negatives, 1840–1860, published in 2007 by the Metropolitan Museum of Art (New York), Roger Taylor writes at the end of his article on St. John, "Although she is unlikely ever to be considered a great photographer, St. John was certainly one of the more interesting amateurs of the mid-nineteenth century, not only because she was a woman but because her attitude toward picture making and photography was highly original." The article is accompanied by 12 plates from St. John's album of Italian views. (Note: The article and some of the plates can be seen here (Google Books).)

== Permanent collections ==
- Metropolitan Museum of Art (New York City)
- J. Paul Getty Museum (California)
- Swansea Museum
