= Peter Wickens Fry =

English photographer (1795-1860)

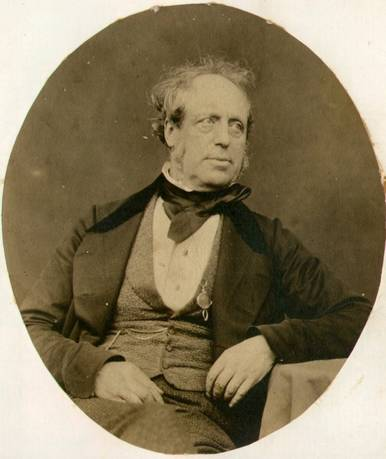
- Peter Wickens Fry
- Born: Peter Wickens Fry; 1795; Compton Bishop, Somerset, Kingdom of Great Britain
- Died: 29 August 1860 (aged 64–65); London, United Kingdom of Great Britain and Ireland
- Occupations: Photographer and solicitor
- Years active: 1841–60 The photo is from the personal album of Jane Martha St. John.

Peter Wickens Fry (1795 – 27 August 1860) was a pioneering English amateur photographer, although professionally he was a London solicitor. In the early 1850s, Fry worked with Frederick Scott Archer, assisting him in the early experiments of the wet collodion process. He was also active in helping Roger Fenton to set up the Royal Photographic Society in 1853. Several of his photographs are in the Victoria and Albert Museum in London.

== Early life and family ==
Fry was born to Peter Fry (b.c. 1768–1846) and Joanna Chapman in Compton Bishop, a village in northern Somerset, some time during 1795. He had two younger brothers and two sisters. His younger brother Bruges later lived at Hill House in Cheddar and Peter lived at Compton House in Compton Bishop. He trained as a solicitor and began his career in the legal profession but later he became one of the pioneers of photography in the country.

== Career ==
In the early 1840s he developed an interest in the emerging art of photography. He apparently experimented with photogenic drawing before Henry Fox Talbot developed the calotype process in 1841. The first stage of experimentation was with daguerreotype portraits. His interest and developments in photography led to his being elected to the Society of Arts (RSA) in 1845. He established the Calotype Club to pursue his keen interest with friends at his own home. The first meeting of the club was held in 1847. It was an informal gathering of 12 photographers involved in the calotype process. Meeting once or twice a month, the club discussed technical developments and applications. The club was renamed the Royal Photographic Club in 1848. Some of the other members of the club were: Robert Hunt, Fellow of the RSA who was director of the Museum of Practical geology and in early days of photography was on authority on the subject; Archer, a sculptor and Dr. Hugh Welch Diamond who was superintendent of the Surrey County Lunatic Asylum.

In the early 1850s, Fry worked with Archer, assisting him in the early experiments of wet collodion. The Photographic Journal reported that he had done much to support the application of the collodion process. Fry's first picture using the collodion process was exhibited at a meeting of the Society of Arts in 1851. It was Fry who introduced Archer to Richard Horne; and Horne's exposition case at The Great Exhibition (1851), may have contained the first collodion picture which was publicly exhibited. Fry, in 1852, collaborated with Archer in applying the collodion positive, or ambrotype process for portraiture, which found extensive application. This process, which is a different improved version of the wet collodion process, involved under exposure of the negative which would be coated by black paint that would make the picture appear like a frame of velvet lining. In the winter of 1852–53, Fry and the Society held its first exhibition of photographs. He was active in helping Roger Fenton to set up the Royal Photographic Society in 1853. He was active on the Council of the Royal Photographic Society until he was forced to resign his seat when he became ill, shortly before his death.

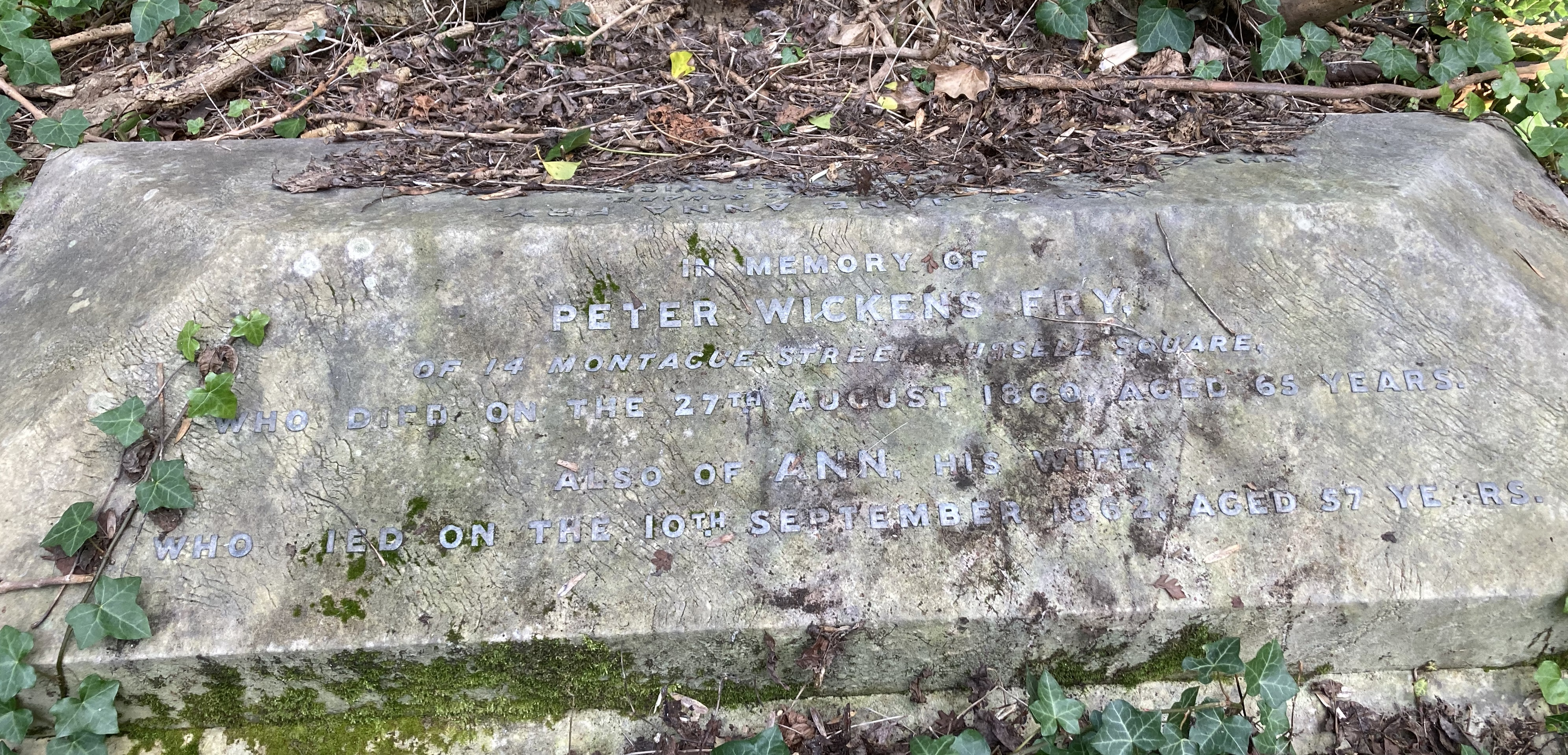
Family vault of Peter Wickens Fry in Highgate Cemetery (west side)

The attorneys John Loxley and Henry William Bull were articled to Fry; Fry and Loxley practised together as solicitors at 80 Cheapside, London. During his legal career, he became a London Commissioner to administer oaths in Chancery. He also served as Director of the Legal and Commercial Life Assurance Society whose offices were close by at 73 Cheapside. At the end of his career, he appeared as the solicitor for James Henderson in the court case known as "Talbot Vs Henderson", a case for infringement rights claimed by Talbot for his calotype patent. Fry eventually was successful in getting a court order which awarded a compensation of 330 pounds to his client.

Fry died at 14 Montague Street in London on 27 August 1860 and is buried in a family vault in Highgate Cemetery. Several of his photographs belong to the Society and the Victoria and Albert Museum in London, including his portrait taken in 1851.
