= Deane, Hampshire =

Village and parish in Hampshire, England

Coordinates: 51.2510°N 1.2204°W

Deane
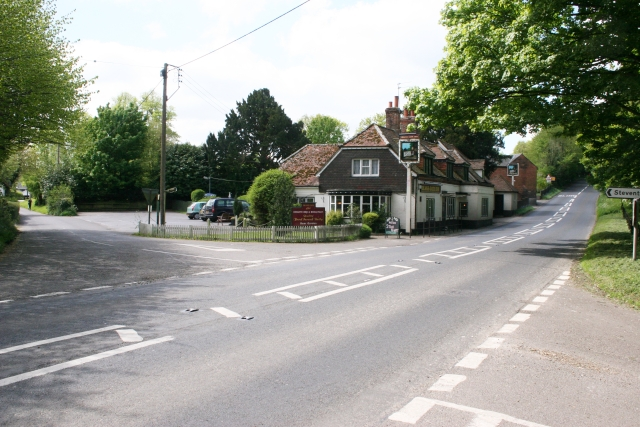
- The Deane Gate Inn

- Location within Hampshire
- Population: 5,322 (Parish, 2001); 202 (2011 Census including Malshanger)
- OS grid reference: SU545505
  - London: 57.6m
- Civil parish: Deane
- District: Basingstoke and Deane
- Shire county: Hampshire
- Region: South East
- Country: England
- Sovereign state: United Kingdom
- Post town: BASINGSTOKE
- Postcode district: RG23
- Dialling code: 01256
- Police: Hampshire and Isle of Wight
- Fire: Hampshire and Isle of Wight
- Ambulance: South Central
- UK Parliament: North West Hampshire

Deane is a village and civil parish in the county of Hampshire, England and according to the council, is its smallest. Its name appears in the name of the borough in which it is placed, Basingstoke and Deane.

== Governance ==
The village is a civil parish and part of the Oakley and North Waltham ward of Basingstoke and Deane borough council. The borough council is a Non-metropolitan district of Hampshire County Council.

The modern district of Basingstoke changed its name to "Basingstoke and Deane" in 1978; adding Deane to the name to represent the rural parts of the borough, with Deane being the area's smallest village according to the councillors.

== Geography ==
The parish is surrounded by other Hampshire parishes, with Kingsclere north, Hannington north east, Oakley east, Dummer south east, North Waltham south, Steventon south west and Overton north west.

== See also ==
- List of places in Hampshire
