= Oakley Hall, Hampshire =

Oakley Hall
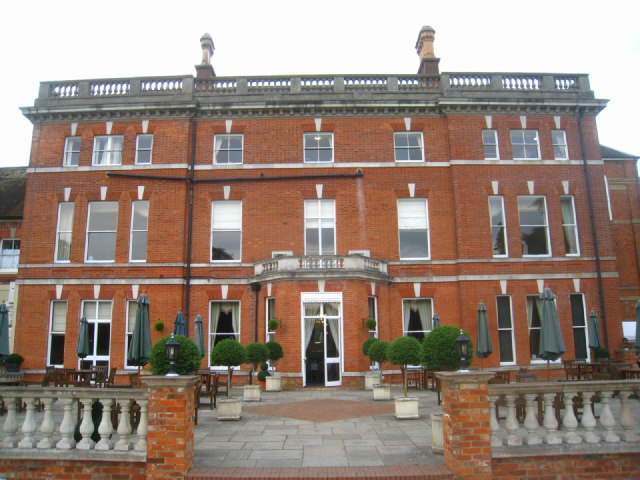
- Oakley Hall

- Location within Hampshire

General information
- Type: Georgian mansion
- Location: Oakley, Hampshire, England
- Coordinates: 51°14′57″N 1°11′6″W
- Completed: 1795; 231 years ago

Oakley Hall is a Georgian manor in Oakley, Hampshire, located 10 km (6.2 mi) to the west of Basingstoke. Completed in 1795 by Wither Bramston, the building is now a hotel and conference centre . It is located in a wooded park intersected by the former South Western railway.

== History ==
The history of the manor, originally known as Hall or Hall Place, dates from 1299 when Robert atte Hall and John atte Hall were its free tenants under the manor of Deane, Hampshire. The property changed hands several times over the centuries, coming into the ownership of George Wither in 1620, who added to it "estates in five other manors as well as the advowsons of two churches". The estate then fell into the hands of the Bramston family. Wither Bramston (born 1753), demolished the old building and completed Oakley Hall in 1795, after his marriage to Mary Chute of The Vyne. Notable residents have included William Wither Bramston Beach (1826–1901), a Conservative politician, and the early amateur photographer Jane Martha St. John (1801–1882) who lived with her husband in the estate's Oakley Cottage.

== Geography ==
Oakley Hall is located 10 kilometres (6.2 mi) west of Basingstoke. It lies to the east of the two main churches in Oakley, St Leonards and Oakley Church, off the main road through the village. Situated in a wooded park of 198 hectares (490 acres), it stretches from Deane to Church Oakley Parish.

A national school, accommodating 120 students, was built in nearby Oakley on the property of W. W. Bramston Beach in 1855 and by 1872, it was expanded. A headmaster's cottage and a children's playground were further additions. In 1940, Oakley Hall itself was used as a boarding school known as Hilsea College for the children of naval officers. It 1973, it was reported that the estate included Tadley Place and Wyford Farm.

== Jane Austen and Oakley Hall ==
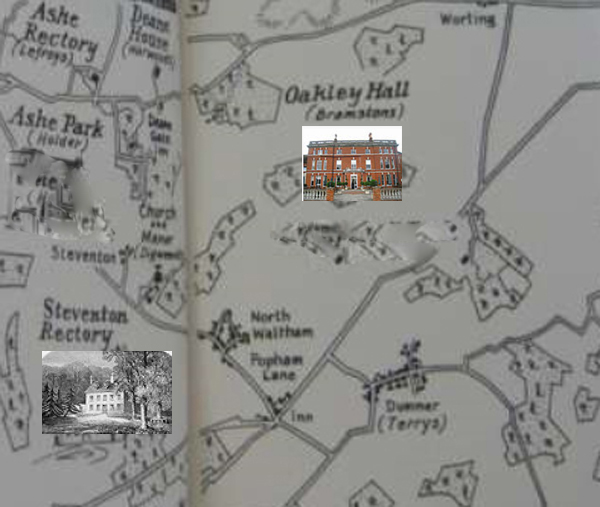
Map showing the locations of Oakley Hall and Steventon Rectory in 1800.

Jane Austen lived with her parents at the Rectory near the Church in Steventon (shown on the map). Oakley Hall was one of her closest neighbours and she often liked to walk to there to see her friends the Bramstons. At this time there were three Bramstons living at the Hall – Wither Bramston, his wife Mary and his unmarried sister Augusta Bramston. In her letters to her sister Cassandra Jane recalled how she enjoyed her visits. She mentioned that she ate some sandwiches with mustard and praised Wither Bramston’s porter (beer). She also admired Mary Bramston’s transparencies which were decorations for the window. According to a biographer of Jane Austen this hobby was recalled years later when she described three similar transparencies as adornments of Fanny Price’s East Room at Mansfield Park.

In the same letter she mentioned that Mary Bramston promised to give her two medicinal plants called heartsease “one all yellow and one all purple”. Then all of them walked down to the village of Oakley where they bought ten pairs of worsted stockings and a shift.

The Austens had no carriage and therefore when attending functions they were often invited by their neighbours to travel with them. Since Oakley Hall was so close the Bramstons usually extended this invitation. In one of her letters Jane outlines in detail a Ball that has just been held at Basingstoke. She says that “a very civil note of invitation for me came from Mrs Bramston who wrote I believe as soon as she knew of the Ball.

== Features ==
The old hall is an elegantly decorated building. It is a four star hotel with facilities for small conferences.
