= Laverstoke Park Farm =

Farm in Hampshire, England

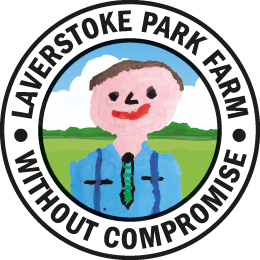
- Laverstoke Park Farm company logo
- Town/City: Overton
- State: Hampshire
- Country: England
- Coordinates: 51°13′08″N 1°15′30″W
- Area: 2,500 acres (1,000 ha)

Laverstoke Park Farm is a farm near Overton, Hampshire, England, owned by 1979 Formula One World Champion, Jody Scheckter.

== Background ==
The farm is 2,500 acres (1,000 ha) in size and follows biodynamic principles. It has cows, sheep and notably water buffalo along with an on-site abattoir (currently closed). The farm is also involved in research with the Soil Association.

== Products ==
Laverstoke Park Farm has won a number of awards for its products. It sells meat and buffalo dairy products through the Waitrose supermarket chain and the Ocado online supermarket. The company also supplies buffalo to the Gourmet Burger Kitchen chain.

== Events ==
In 2016 the Universal Cookery and Food Festival was held at Laverstoke Park Farm, as well as since 2012 every August they host CarFest South.

== Label controversy ==
In October 2012 a complaints panel ruled that Laverstoke's label was inappropriate for selling alcoholic beverages because it might appeal to children, and ordered retailers signed to the Portman Group's Code of Practice on the Naming, Packaging and Promotion of Alcoholic Drinks to stop ordering the beer and lager produced under a Laverstoke license. Laverstoke Park Farm's founder said the order may spell the end of beer production for the farm. Jody Scheckter later decided to change the labels to comply with the Portman guidelines
