= Overton railway station =

Railway station in Hampshire, England

Coordinates: 51.254°N 1.260°W

Overton
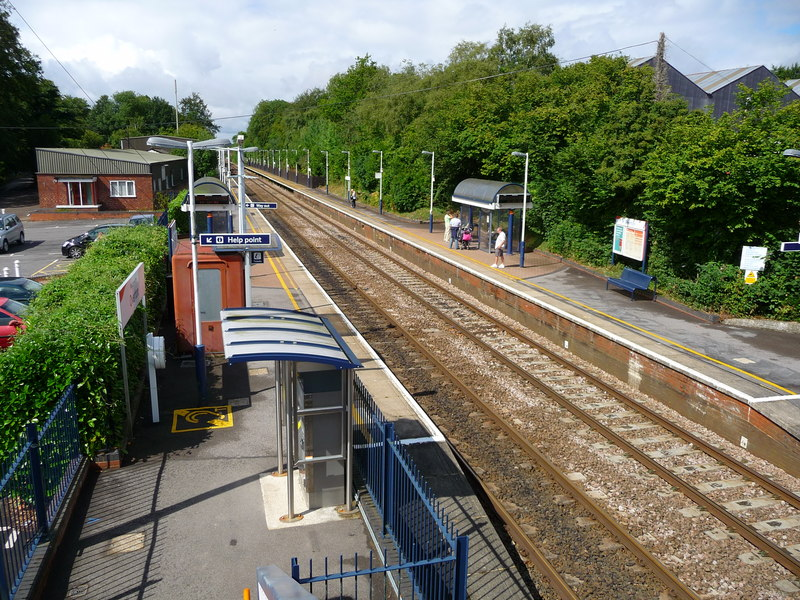

General information
- Location: Overton, Basingstoke and Deane; England
- Grid reference: SU517508
- Manager: South Western Railway
- Platforms: 2

Other information
- Station code: OVR
- Classification: DfT category E

History
- Opened: 3 July 1854

Passengers
- 2020/21: ▼34,348
- 2021/22: ▲90,808
- 2022/23: ▲0.122 million
- 2023/24: ▼0.121 million
- 2024/25: ▲0.174 million
Location
Notes
- Passenger statistics from the Office of Rail and Road

Overton railway station serves the village of Overton in Hampshire, England. It is located in the hamlet of Quidhampton.

It is 55 miles 42 chains (89.4 km) down the line from London Waterloo. The station is served and managed by South Western Railway.

== Services ==
South Western Railway operates an hourly service (with peak extras) between London Waterloo and Salisbury with limited extensions to Bristol Temple Meads, Exeter St Davids and Yeovil Pen Mill. Services call every two hours each way on Sundays, terminating eastbound at Reading instead of Basingstoke (which is the usual Monday to Saturday terminus).

== Recent Developments ==
As of 25 May 2025, train services operating through Overton railway station have officially come under public ownership, following the transfer of South Western Railway (SWR) operations to a publicly owned entity.

In line with Overton's Neighbourhood Development Plan (2025–2044), there are proposals to improve pedestrian access to the station, including enhanced signage on both sides of the railway along Overton Road and Andover Road. Additionally, a proposed development by Bargate Homes, includes the construction of 130 new homes and a 15-hectare country park near Sapley Lane. The proximity of the new housing to Overton railway station, approximately a ten-minute cycle ride away, is highlighted as a key feature, promoting the use of public transport among residents.

| Preceding station | National Rail | Following station |
|---|---|---|
| Basingstoke | South Western Railway; West of England Main Line | Whitchurch |
