= Overton, Hampshire =

Village and parish in Hampshire, England

Coordinates: 51.2439°N 1.2615°W

Overton
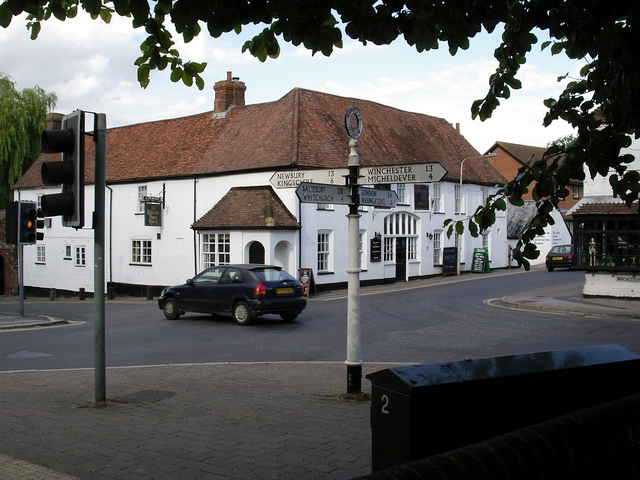
- Crossroads in the centre of Overton

- Location within Hampshire
- Population: 4,315 (2011 Census)
- OS grid reference: SU516496
- District: Basingstoke and Deane
- Shire county: Hampshire
- Region: South East
- Country: England
- Sovereign state: United Kingdom
- Post town: Basingstoke
- Postcode district: RG25
- Dialling code: 01256
- Police: Hampshire and Isle of Wight
- Fire: Hampshire and Isle of Wight
- Ambulance: South Central
- UK Parliament: North West Hampshire

Overton is a village and parish in Hampshire, England, west of Basingstoke and east of Andover and Whitchurch. The village contains the smaller hamlets of Southington, Northington, Ashe, Polhampton, and Quidhampton, the latter two lying to the north of the village. The River Test has its source 1 mile (1.6 km) to the east in Ashe.

There is evidence of habitation since the Stone and Bronze Ages with finds and barrows nearby.

== History ==
=== Earliest origins ===
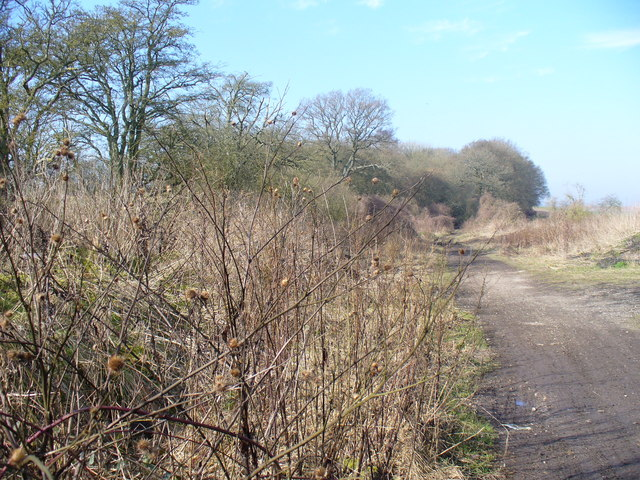
The Harrow Way – surviving present track north east of Overton, Hampshire

The area around Overton has been inhabited for millennia with evidence of Stone Age, Bronze Age and Celtic occupation scattered across the parish and surrounding countryside, including tumuli at Popham Beacons at the southern tip of the parish; Abra Barrow on the boundary south west of Overton; a long barrow to the west of Willesley Warren Farm in the north of the parish; strip lynchets on Rotten Hill and the Harrow Way, an ancient track which runs across the parish north of the village.

Roman occupation in the area is shown by the discovery of Roman pottery shards in Little Meadow and the Port Way Roman Road marks the northern boundary of the parish.

=== 10th to 15th century ===
The development of the village began in earnest during the 10th century when Frithstan, the Bishop of Winchester, in a chartership dated 909, was granted "Uferantun" by King Edward the Elder. Overton developed over the next century and by the time of Domesday Book the settlement included a large number of dwellings, the Church of St Mary and several corn mills primarily due to its location on the River Test. By the 12th century Overton was a significant location with a royal residence, Tidgrove Kings House, being developed just north of Overton. The residence was built for Henry II for use on journeys between Windsor and either Winchester or Hamwych (Southampton) which was the customary port for travel to and from his French possessions. The importance and expansion continued throughout the 12th and 13th centuries facilitated in 1218 by Henry III providing a royal grant to the bishop of Winchester for a market in "his manor of Overton" when burgage tenure was introduced. By this period Overton was becoming a major settlement on the north–south route to and from Winchester.

In 1246 Henry III granted a fair on the "eve, feast and morrow of the Translation of St. Thomas of Canterbury" which can be considered as the first "official" sheep fair and by the late 13th century Overton had grown to such a size that in 1295 two representatives were sent to Parliament and by the early 14th century the town was providing a rent of £12 0s 9½d to the bishopric (equivalent to £2.75 million in 2015).

Overton was significantly impacted by the Black Death, rents fell by over a half, parliamentary representatives were withdrawn to save costs, the tourns (medieval courts) were not held and the population stagnated. Despite this stagnation Overton survived by consolidating farms and by support from the bishopric though the effects lasted until the end of the 14th century.

By the 15th century trade began to increase enough to support an inn and the White Hart, the oldest inn in Overton, was first recorded in 1442. In this period a new fulling mill was built and there was a large increase in population. It was in this period that Thomas Wolsey, Bishop of Winchester, obtained licence in 1519 to hold an additional fair at Overton on the "eve, the feast and the morrow of the Feast of St. George the Marty".

=== Tudor to Georgian expansion ===
By the start of the 16th century a period of growth was established with expansion westward along the River Test. The economy in the area was still primarily agricultural based around sheep and corn; with the sheep fair recording 30,000 average sheep penned. The economy was also being bolstered by the increase of mills along the River Test including corn mills, fulling mills and silk mills.

With the increase in prosperity came a desire for greater power, the freeholders began to choose their own officers; port reeve, constable, bailiffs, beer-tasters and leather sealers at the court leet of the borough.

Despite this in 1587 the Court of Chancery deemed that Overton should lose its charter as a town 'through neglect' and it reverted to being a village.

A significant impact on Overton was the development of papermaking within the area by Henry Portal a French Huguenot who took the lease on Bere Mill on the River Test, between Overton and Whitchurch, in 1712.

By this time the focus of the village was the west–east route from London to the West Country and in 1754 the road was turnpiked and what is now the High Street had a large number of inns to service the Stagecoach Passengers.

In 1805 Overton was one of the changes of horses for the post chaise of Lieutenant Lapenotiere, HMS Pickle who carried the historic dispatches of Lord Nelson's victory and death in the Battle of Trafalgar on 21 October 1805. This event is commemorated by the Trafalgar Way, the plaque being located on the village library.

=== Victorian age ===
The major impact on the village in the Victorian era was the arrival of the railways with the London and South Western Railway opening the West of England Main Line and Overton railway station in 1854. The railway caused problems for the local inns and the New Inn, which had only been built in 1770 was sold and demolished in 1860.

The vacant site of the New Inn was donated by George Lamb for the building of the new village school. Lamb paid for the building of the school and land for a separate infants school in Red Lion Lane. These two schools, opened in 1868 and 1871 served the town for nearly a hundred years when the junior and infants schools were combined at a new school in Court Drove.

== Geography ==
The civil parish of Overton covers 3,471 hectares – an area about seven miles north to south (from Polhampton to the A303) and two and a half miles east to west (Ashe Park Lodge to Southington Lodge at Laverstoke Park) and is located in the County of Hampshire. Most of Overton parish is entirely rural with the north of the parish being in the North Wessex Downs Area of Outstanding Natural Beauty.

The River Test, a chalk stream world-famous for its trout fishing, rises about a mile east of Overton at Ashe during normal rainfall conditions though the source can migrate eastwards as far as Oakley in a period of very heavy rainfall. The river flows westwards through the village, historically powering a number of mills, towards Whitchurch before it meanders southwards through Hampshire, eventually reaching the sea at Eling near Southampton.

== Geology ==
The underlying geology – primarily chalk, with alluvial deposits adjacent to the river – results in typical chalk rolling countryside. The lowest parts of the village are about 80 meters above sea level, but the northern and southern extremities of the parish rise to between 160 and 200 meters, offering extensive views of the surrounding area.

== Governance ==
The village is a civil parish and part of the Overton, Laverstoke and Steventon ward of Basingstoke and Deane borough council. The borough council is a Non-metropolitan district of Hampshire County Council.

== Papermaking ==
Henry Portal founded Portals Paper Mill at Bere Mill, on the River Test between Overton and Whitchurch, in 1712, adding Laverstoke Mill to his enterprise seven years later, which allowed him to win the contract to make banknote paper for the Bank of England in 1724. Portals significantly expanded in the 20th century with the development of a new Overton Mill near Quidhampton in 1922 and the Bank of England relocated a significant number of employees to the area during World War II.

Papermaking was undertaken within the village at the Overton Mill which used to produce high-security paper for over 150 national currencies. In 1995 the firm was sold to De La Rue and the Portals name was lost only for it to return in 2018 when De La Rue sold its papermaking assets to Epiris who resurrected the Portals name. Epiris closed Portals Mill in 2022 and after three hundred years papermaking is no longer undertaken in the area. The historic Laverstoke Mill has been refurbished is now used by Bombay Sapphire with a visitors centre.

The location of the Portals Mill at Quidhampton has been referenced as the reason why £1 is known as a "Quid". However, there are many disputed origins and, given the various locations for Portals Papermills around the Overton area over the last three centuries, it is probably unlikely.

== Church of St Mary ==
Overton church, dedicated to St Mary, has medieval origins though the current church building is from the late Norman period in architecture.

Although only the nave pillars remain of the original church, there is a record that in 1180 it had a nave of three bays. The old church probably had narrow aisles and a small chancel, the expansion of the church occurred in the 13C with new chancel windows, north and south, and possibly its single frame roof with tie beams. At that time the aisles of the nave were probably widened to give more room in the nave.

For many centuries the bishop appointed a rector of Overton church and parish, who very often did not live in it, and he in turn appointed a vicar, who conducted services and was, in fact, 'the Parson'. The rectors and vicars since 1246 are recorded in a diptych board in the north aisle, near the door of the outer vestry.

The present aisles of the nave date from about a hundred years after the first names on that board. The great door of the main (south) entrance may similarly date from about 1350–1400. It may have been locally made, or perhaps only its lock and hinges are of local construction. The door is unusual in that it folds in the middle. The ornamented ironwork is said to be of Hampshire workmanship.

In the late 15th century the tower was rebuilt further west than an earlier one, and the nave and aisles were extended westward to meet it. The new tower had wooden board cladding at the belfry stage, and a timbered spire. The chancel was also enlarged at this time to its present length. On the inner sill of the north-west window in the chancel there is an inscription c. 1400. It reads: ‘Hic jacet d°. Willms Savage quondam rector istius ecciesie’ – i.e. Here lies Dominus (Master) William Savage, formerly rector of this church. In 1609 the first two bells of the present ring were cast.

In 1853 the whole church was re-roofed and some of it rebuilt, however, the rebuilt tower did not last long. A huge crack soon appeared in it, so the spire was removed and the west wall was shored up with foot-square beams of oak at a cost of about £1500. In 1908 the tower was again rebuilt with a spire added in 1913.

The churchyard is noted for having a large and long-established colony of glow worms (Lampyris noctiluca), which are becoming increasingly rare in the UK.

== Present day ==
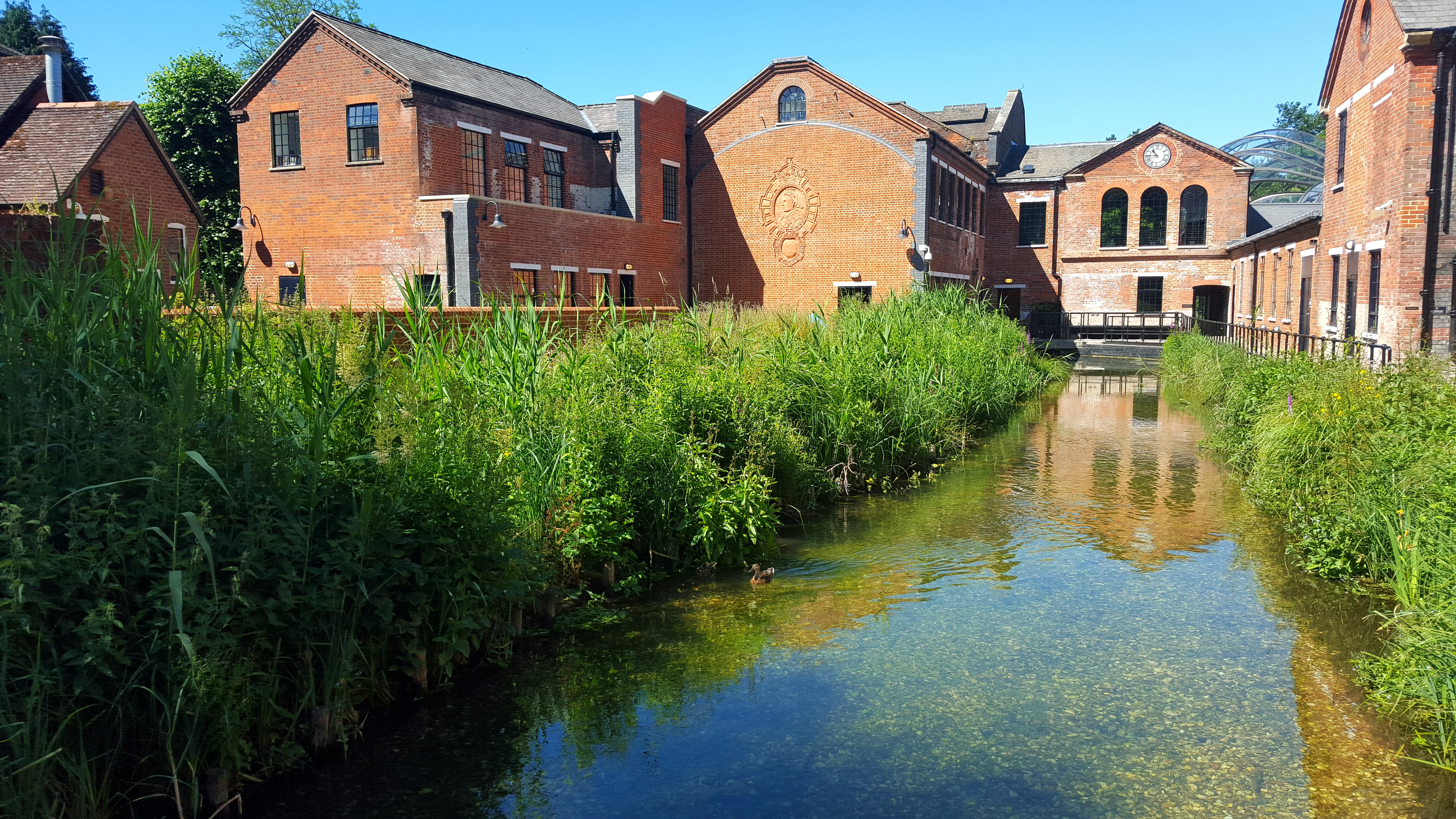
Bombay Sapphire

The 2011 population of the village was 4,315, rising to 4,935 when the hamlets of Laverstoke and Steventon are included with the village expanding following the developments at Foxdown, Overton Hill, Charters Hill and Seven Acres.

The village has local industry with the Portals Papermill and the recent Bombay Sapphire development in nearby Laverstoke, as well as light industrial units to the north and east of the village.

The village has a selection of shops and services and has four public houses; The White Hart, The Greyhound, The Red Lion and The Old House at Home.

== Village school ==
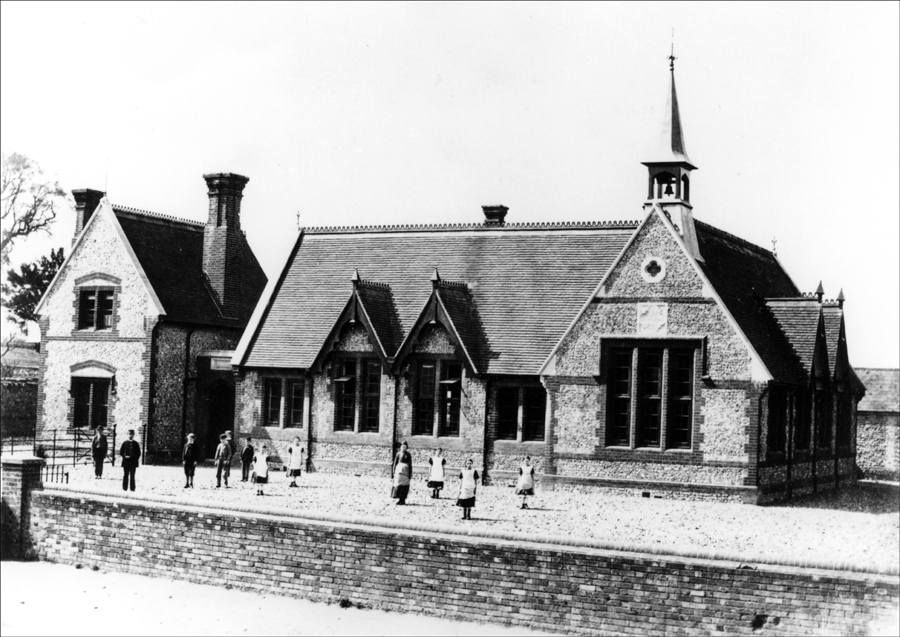
Overton Village School (1868)

The first village school was founded in 1817 as a free primary school situated in the workhouse. In 1834 a grant was made available to relocate the school to cottages on the River Test, though the building was never satisfactory and in 1858 a new school situated in the centre of the village at the crossroads was developed.

In 1968 a new school was built at the top of Court Drove to meet the needs of modern education and the school has been repeatedly upgraded in 1998, 2001 and 2014. The school has a landscaped playing field, children's play area and formal playgrounds. The school is in the latest inspection (July 2014) rated "outstanding" by Ofsted.

The 1858 school buildings still remain, now serving as the village library and community centre.

== Transport ==
The village is served by Overton railway station on the West of England Main Line, which lies to the north of the village and by a weekday bus service provided by Stagecoach South to Whitchurch, Basingstoke and Andover.

== Sport and leisure ==
Overton has over 30 acres of sporting facilities that are managed by the Overton Recreation Centre including a 9-hole Golf Course, Cricket Pitches, Football Grounds, Tennis Courts as well as numerous covered venues. Overton also has an outdoor swimming pool at Lordsfield and has many societies ranging from Art to Zumba.

=== Football ===
Overton United F.C. play at Bridge Street and at Berrydown Sports Ground.

=== Athletics ===
Overton is the home of Overton Harriers & AC, a successful athletics club, based at the Bridge Street Pavilion. Overton Harriers compete in the Hampshire Road Race League and the Hampshire XC League and were the winners of the Men's Hampshire Road Race League in 2018.

Overton Harriers host two races; the 'Overton 5' a road race which takes place in the village and surrounding countryside, and the Combe Gibbet race which is a 16-mile point to point race from Walbury Hill to Overton.

=== Cricket ===
Overton Cricket Club are based in the centre of the village at the ORC grounds in Bridge Street, offering youth and senior cricket, as well as ECB All Stars, Dynamos & from 2022, W10 Women's soft ball cricket. They also play at the Berrydown facility

=== Sheep Fair ===
Overton holds a quadrennial Sheep Fair in commemoration of farmers leading sheep through the village for fairs recorded as early as 1246. The modern fair was first held in 2000 and most recently in July 2016.

=== Overton Mummers ===
Overton has a group of Mummers, who perform frequently over the Yuletide period outside some of the public houses in the village.

=== Carfest ===
Overton is the location of the Children in Need fundraising event Carfest South which is hosted at Southley Farm during August Bank Holiday.

=== Overton Radio ===
Overton also has its own local radio station, Overton Radio, broadcasting online 24 hours a day, playing music and bringing local information to listeners. The station launched on July 30th 2023.

== Literature ==
In Richard Adams' Watership Down, the rival rabbit warren of Efrafa was located just north of the railway above Northington Farm in Overton.

== Peacocks ==
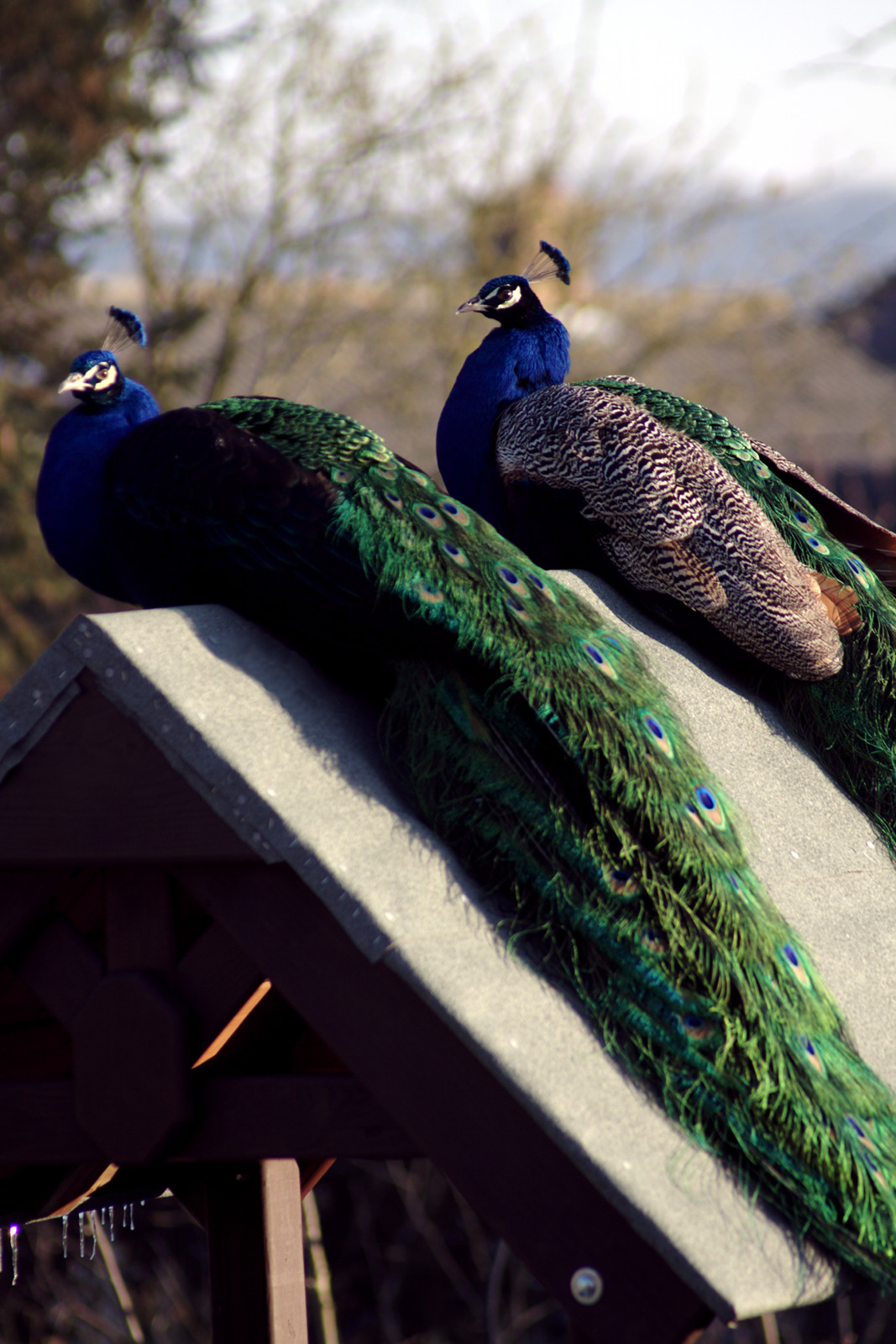
Percy and Pierre the Peacocks enjoy the afternoon sun in an Overton back garden

Two peacocks, nicknamed ‘Pierre’ and ‘Percy’, live in the Dellands area at the top of the village. Thought to have come from a lavender farm in nearby Whitchurch and accused by some locals of disturbing the peace with their courtship vocals, a plan was initially hatched to evict them but this was overturned by the Parish Council which has agreed that they can stay.
