= Quidhampton, Hampshire =

Hamlet in Hampshire, England

Coordinates: 51.2500°N 1.2666°W

Quidhampton
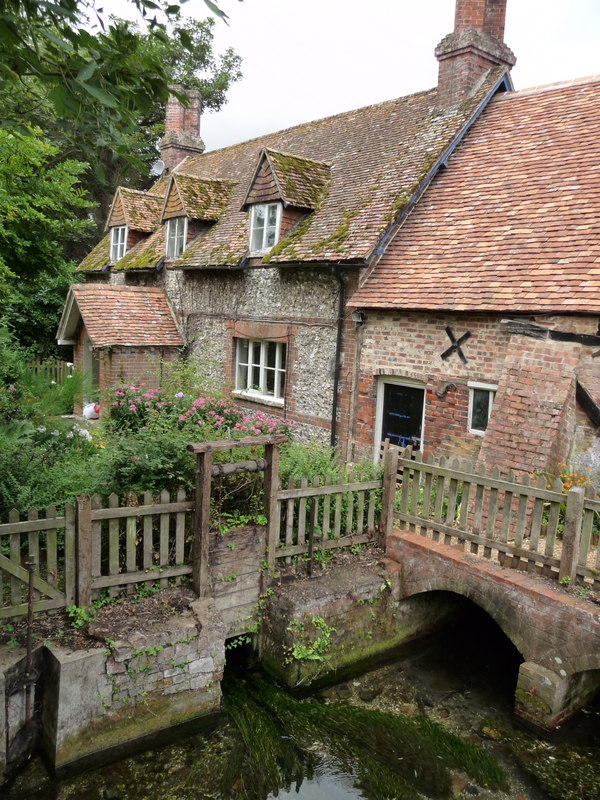
- Quidhampton Mill

- Location within Hampshire
- OS grid reference: SU512503
- Civil parish: Overton
- District: Basingstoke and Deane
- Shire county: Hampshire
- Region: South East
- Country: England
- Sovereign state: United Kingdom
- Post town: BASINGSTOKE
- Postcode district: RG25
- Dialling code: 01256
- Police: Hampshire and Isle of Wight
- Fire: Hampshire and Isle of Wight
- Ambulance: South Central
- UK Parliament: Basingstoke

Quidhampton is a hamlet within Overton civil parish in the borough of Basingstoke and Deane in Hampshire, England. It is located just to the north of the large village of Overton, on the north bank of the River Test. Overton railway station, on the West of England Main Line, is located in the hamlet.

== Toponym ==
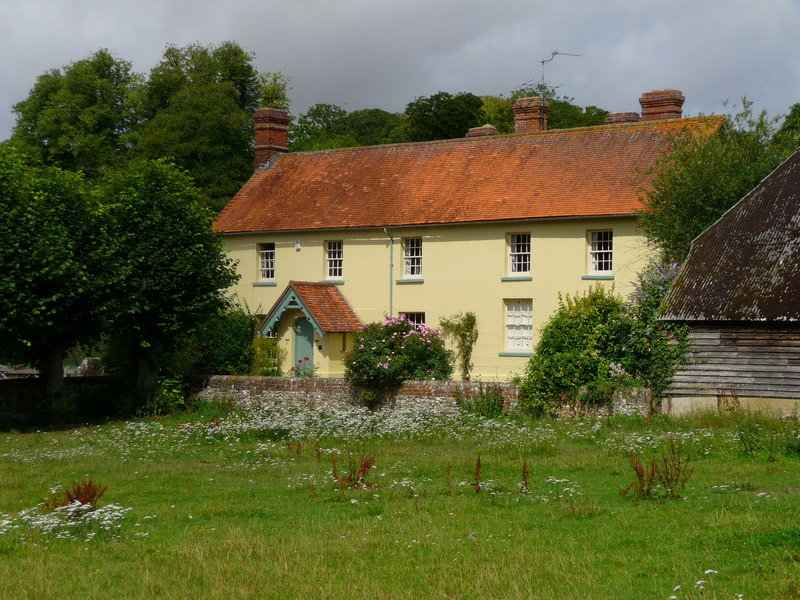
Listed farmhouse

Historically spelled Quedhampton or Quydhampton, first part of the place name comes from "coed", the Celtic word for wood.
