= Oakley, Hampshire =

Village in Hampshire, England

Coordinates: 51°15′03″N 1°10′35″W

Oakley
- Village
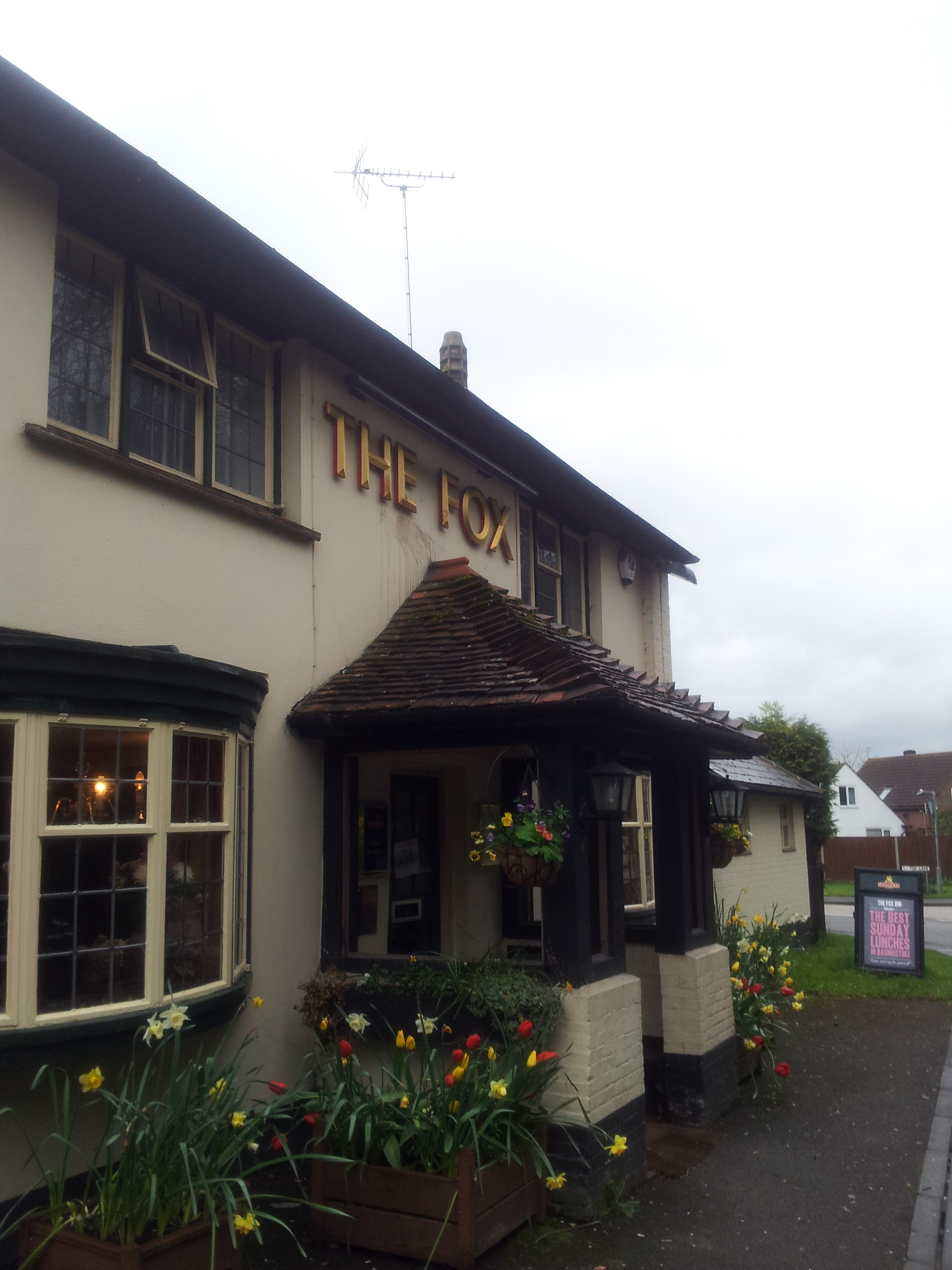
- The Fox Pub

- Location within Hampshire
- Population: 5,086 (2011 Census)
- OS grid reference: SU575504
  - London: 48 mi (77 km) ENE
- Civil parish: Oakley
- District: Basingstoke and Deane
- Shire county: Hampshire
- Region: South East
- Country: England
- Sovereign state: United Kingdom
- Post town: BASINGSTOKE
- Postcode district: RG23
- Dialling code: 01256
- Police: Hampshire and Isle of Wight
- Fire: Hampshire and Isle of Wight
- Ambulance: South Central
- UK Parliament: Basingstoke

Oakley is a village in the borough of Basingstoke and Deane in Hampshire, England, located around 4.5 miles (7 km) west of Basingstoke. In the 2001 Census it had a population of 5,322. Together with the smaller village of Deane, it forms the Oakley and Deane civil parish renamed as Oakley at the 2011 Census.

Oakley appears in Domesday Book of 1086.

Oakley is divided into two districts, East Oakley and Church Oakley. The village sits on chalkland. Its village magazine, Link, is published monthly.

== Education and worship ==
Oakley has two linked educational facilities: Oakley CE Junior School and Oakley Infant school, both of which have in the past achieved 'Outstanding' ratings in OFSTED inspections. In 2015 Oakley CE Junior School's overall effectiveness was rated 'Good'. Pupils of Oakley CE Junior School won a BBC learning competition, to create a Doctor Who mini-adventure. Their winning adventure was entitled "Death Is the Only Answer".

Oakley contains a small Methodist church, and the ancient Anglican church of St Leonard's which also has a community centre in the building opposite and the old school house where there is a pre school nursery. The Anglican church (St John's) was recently demolished for safety reasons and has been transformed into a garden of remembrance with the war memorial positioned on the site of the altar.

== Facilities ==
In the centre of the village is a duck pond surrounded by thatched dwellings. The duck pond is inhabited by mallard ducks and coots. The village is supplied with local tradesmen, has a surgery (part of a shared practice with the next village of Overton), a central convenience store with a post office, a local butcher's, a cake shop, multiple estate agents (Brockenhurst, Jacobs), pharmacy, an arts and crafts shop, a Co-Op store (opened in December 2020), a local window cleaner and a dental practice. There are three public houses, the Barley Mow, The Fox (on the B3400) and The Beach Arms. A coffee shop was an addition to the village. In Meon Road there is a beauty salon, a hairdresser salon and a well stocked charity shop. Its railway station, originally on the West of England Main Line, opened in April 1856 and closed in 1963. The station buildings are now used by other businesses. The village allotment site is next to the old railway station. Situated to the west of the village is Oakley Hall, an 18th-century Georgian manor that is now a hotel, used for weddings, special celebrations and corporate events.

== Recreation & Surrounding Area ==
There are opportunities for walking with the Wayfarers Way close at hand and a riding stable and riding school are found in the village. Oakley Cricket Club was founded in 1849; OCC's grounds are at Oakley Park, where, on 11 June 1961, the Hampshire cricketer Roy Marshall captained a team for a benefit match. This team, which won the match with 246 runs, also included Arthur Milton and Cliff Michelmore. Oakley Football Club was founded in 1967 by the Chelsea FC footballer, Peter Houseman. Oakley Tennis Club has four hard courts. Oakley Bowling Club was formed in 1978 and plays on the Malshanger Estate. There are several children’s play areas within the village with the largest of these undergoing a refurbishment in 2021-22. There are many short, medium and longer countryside walks all reached from the borders of the village. There is a multi-user path which links Oakley to Kempshott; this can be utilised by walking, cycling or with buggies/wheelchairs/mobility scooters which are capable of travelling over rough terrain. There are many small and medium wooded copses surrounding the village, many of which have beautiful displays of bluebells in early spring.

== Oakley and Deane Parish Council ==
Oakley Parish Council was formed in 1894. In 1966 the East Oakley ward of Wootton St Lawrence became part of the parish and in 1976 the Deane Parish Meeting also joined the council, at which point it became known as Oakley and Deane Parish Council. The 2025 chairman of the council is Gary McAllister

== See also ==
- Oakley Hall
