= London Film Critics Circle Awards 2018 =

British film awards ceremony

39th London Film Critics' Circle Awards

20 January 2019

Film of the Year:
Roma

British/Irish Film of the Year:
The Favourite

The 39th London Film Critics' Circle Awards, honouring the best in film for 2018, were announced by the London Film Critics' Circle on 20 January 2019 at The May Fair Hotel, in Mayfair, London. The nominations were announced on 18 December 2018. The event was hosted by British comedian Judi Love.

== Winners and nominees ==
Winners are listed first and highlighted with boldface.

Film of the Year	Director of the Year
**Roma**; BlacKkKlansman; Cold War; The Favourite; First Man; First Reformed; The Happy Prince; Leave No Trace; Shoplifters; You Were Never Really Here	**Alfonso Cuarón – Roma**; Debra Granik – Leave No Trace; Yorgos Lanthimos – The Favourite; Paweł Pawlikowski – Cold War; Lynne Ramsay – You Were Never Really Here
Actor of the Year	Actress of the Year
**Ethan Hawke – First Reformed**; Christian Bale – Vice; Rupert Everett – The Happy Prince; Ben Foster – Leave No Trace; Joaquin Phoenix – You Were Never Really Here	**Olivia Colman – The Favourite**; Yalitza Aparicio – Roma; Glenn Close – The Wife; Toni Collette – Hereditary; Joanna Kulig – Cold War
Supporting Actor of the Year	Supporting Actress of the Year
**Richard E. Grant – Can You Ever Forgive Me?**; Adam Driver – BlacKkKlansman; Michael B. Jordan – Black Panther; Daniel Kaluuya – Widows; Alessandro Nivola – Disobedience	**Rachel Weisz – The Favourite**; Elizabeth Debicki – Widows; Cynthia Erivo – Bad Times at the El Royale; Claire Foy – First Man; Regina King – If Beale Street Could Talk
Screenwriter of the Year	Foreign Language Film of the Year
**Deborah Davis and Tony McNamara – The Favourite**; Alfonso Cuarón – Roma; Gillian Flynn and Steve McQueen – Widows; Barry Jenkins – If Beale Street Could Talk; Paul Schrader – First Reformed	**Cold War**; BPM (Beats per Minute); A Fantastic Woman; Roma; Shoplifters
Documentary of the Year	British/Irish Film of the Year
**Faces Places**; McQueen; They Shall Not Grow Old; Three Identical Strangers; Whitney	**The Favourite**; Apostasy; Beast; The Happy Prince; You Were Never Really Here
British/Irish Actor of the Year	British/Irish Actress of the Year
**Rupert Everett – The Happy Prince**; Christian Bale – Mowgli and Vice; Steve Coogan – Holmes & Watson, Ideal Home, and Stan & Ollie; Richard E. Grant – Can You Ever Forgive Me? and The Nutcracker and the Four Realms; Daniel Kaluuya – Black Panther and Widows	**Jessie Buckley – Beast**; Emily Blunt – A Quiet Place, Mary Poppins Returns, and Sherlock Gnomes; Olivia Colman – The Favourite; Claire Foy – First Man, The Girl in the Spider's Web, and Unsane; Rachel Weisz – Disobedience and The Favourite
Young British/Irish Performer of the Year	Breakthrough British/Irish Filmmaker of the Year
**Molly Wright – Apostasy**; Liv Hill – Jellyfish and The Little Stranger; Noah Jupe – Holmes & Watson, A Quiet Place, That Good Night, and The Titan; Anya Taylor-Joy – Glass, The Secret of Marrowbone, and Thoroughbreds; Fionn Whitehead – The Children Act	**Michael Pearce – Beast**; Deborah Davis – The Favourite; Rupert Everett – The Happy Prince; Deborah Haywood – Pin Cushion; Daniel Kokotajlo (director) – Apostasy
British/Irish Short Film of the Year	Technical Achievement Award
**Three Centimetres**; Little Shit; Night Out; Salt & Sauce; Under Growth	**Łukasz Żal – Cold War, cinematography**; Erik Aadahl and Ethan Van der Ryn – A Quiet Place, sound design; Will Becher and Richard Phelan – A Shaun the Sheep Movie: Farmageddon, animation; Joe Bini – You Were Never Really Here, film editing; Nicholas Britell – If Beale Street Could Talk, music; Fiona Crombie – The Favourite, production design; Wade Eastwood – Mission: Impossible – Fallout, stunts; Nick Fenton, Chris Gill, and Julian Hart – American Animals, film editing; Paul Lambert – First Man, visual effects; Marci Rodgers – BlacKkKlansman, costume design; Thom Yorke – Suspiria, music

== Special awards ==
=== The Dilys Powell Award for Excellence in Film ===
- Pedro Almodóvar
