= British Independent Film Awards 2018 =

Held on 2 December 2018

- Date: 2 December 2018
- Location: Old Billingsgate, London, United Kingdom
- Website: www.bifa.film

The British Independent Film Awards 2018 were held on 2 December 2018 to recognise the best in British independent cinema and filmmaking talent from United Kingdom. The nominations were announced on 31 October 2018. The Favourite led the nominations with 13, followed by American Animals with 11.

== Winners and nominees ==
Best British Independent Film	Best Director
The Favourite – Yorgos Lanthimos, Deborah Davis, Tony McNamara, Ceci Dempsey, Ed Guiney and Lee Magiday; American Animals – Bart Layton, Katherine Butler, Dimitri Doganis, Derrin Schlesinger and Mary Jane Skalski; Beast – Michael Pearce, Kristian Brodie, Lauren Dark and Ivana Mackinnon; Disobedience – Sebastián Lelio, Rebecca Lenkiewicz, Ed Guiney, Frida Torresblanco and Rachel Weisz; You Were Never Really Here – Lynne Ramsay, Pascal Caucheteux, Rosa Attab, James Wilson and Rebecca O’Brien	Yorgos Lanthimos – The Favourite; Andrew Haigh – Lean on Pete; Bart Layton – American Animals; Michael Pearce – Beast; Lynne Ramsay – You Were Never Really Here
Best Actor	Best Actress
Joe Cole – A Prayer Before Dawn as Billy Moore; Steve Coogan – Stan & Ollie as Stan Laurel; Rupert Everett – The Happy Prince as Oscar Wilde; Joaquin Phoenix – You Were Never Really Here as Joe; Charlie Plummer – Lean on Pete as Charley Thompson	Olivia Colman – The Favourite as Queen Anne; Gemma Arterton – The Escape as Tara; Jessie Buckley – Beast as Moll; Maxine Peake – Funny Cow as Funny Cow; Rachel Weisz – Disobedience as Ronit Krushka
Best Supporting Actor	Best Supporting Actress
Alessandro Nivola – Disobedience as Dovid Kuperman; Steve Buscemi – Lean on Pete as Del Montgomery; Barry Keoghan – American Animals as Spencer Reinhard; Evan Peters – American Animals as Warren Lipka; Dominic West – Colette as Henry Gauthier-Villars	Rachel Weisz – The Favourite as Sarah Churchill; Nina Arianda – Stan & Ollie as Ida Kitaeva Laurel; Rachel McAdams – Disobedience as Esti Kuperman; Emma Stone – The Favourite as Abigail Masham; Molly Wright – Apostasy as Alex
Best Screenplay	Most Promising Newcomer
Deborah Davis and Tony McNamara – The Favourite; Michael Pearce – Beast; Bart Layton – American Animals; Sebastián Lelio and Rebecca Lenkiewicz – Disobedience; Lynne Ramsay – You Were Never Really Here	Jessie Buckley – Beast; Michaela Coel – Been So Long; Liv Hill – Jellyfish; Marcus Rutherford – Obey; Molly Wright – Apostasy
The Douglas Hickox Award (Best Debut Director)	Best Debut Screenwriter
Richard Billingham – Ray & Liz; Michael Pearce – Beast; Daniel Kokotajlo – Apostasy; Matt Palmer – Calibre; Leanne Welham – Pili	Bart Layton – American Animals; Michael Pearce – Beast; Matt Palmer – Calibre; Daniel Kokotajlo – Apostasy; Karen Gillan – The Party's Just Beginning
Breakthrough Producer	The Discovery Award
Jacqui Davies – Ray & Liz; Kristian Brodie – Beast; Marcie Maclellan – Apostasy; Anna Griffin – Calibre; Faye Ward – Stan & Ollie	Voyageuse – May Miles Thomas; The Dig – Andy Tohill, Ryan Tohill, Stuart Drennan, Brian J. Falconer; Irene’s Ghost – Iain Cunningham, Rebecca Mark-Lawson, David Arthur, Ellie Land; A Moment in the Reeds – Mikko Makela, James Watson; Super November – Douglas King, Josie Long
Best Documentary	Best British Short Film
Evelyn – Orlando Von Einsiedel, Joanna Natasegara; Being Frank: The Chris Sievey Story – Steve Sullivan; Island – Steven Eastwood, Elhum Shakerifar; Nae Pasaran – Felipe Bustos Sierra; Under The Wire – Christopher Martin, Tom Brisley	The Big Day – Dawn Shadforth, Kellie Smith, Michelle Stein; Bitter Sea – Fateme Ahmadi, Emma Parsons; The Field – Sandhya Suri, Balthazar De Ganay, Thomas Bidegain; Pommel – Paris Zarcilla, Sebastian Brown, Ivan Kelava; To Know Him – Ted Evans, Kellie Smith, Jennifer Monks, Michelle Stein
Best International Independent Film	Best Casting
Roma – Alfonso Cuarón, Gabriela Rodriguez and Nicolás Celis; Capernaum – Nadine Labaki, Jihad Hojeily, Michelle Keserwani, Khaled Mouzanar and Michel Merkt; Cold War – Pawel Pawlikowski, Janusz Glowacki, Ewa Puszczynska and Tanya Seghatchian; The Rider – Chloé Zhao, Mollye Asher, Sacha Ben Harroche and Bert Hamelinck; Shoplifters – Hirokazu Kore-eda	Dixie Chassay – The Favourite; Julie Harkin – Beast; Avy Kaufman – American Animals; Andy Pryor – Stan & Ollie; Michelle Smith – Apostasy
Best Costume Design	Best Cinematography
Sandy Powell – The Favourite; Jacqueline Durran – Peterloo; Andrea Flesch – Colette; Guy Sperenza – Stan & Ollie; Alyssa Tull – An Evening with Beverly Luff Linn	Robbie Ryan – The Favourite; Ole Bratt Birkeland – American Animals; Magnus Nordenhof Jønk – Lean on Pete; Tom Townend – You Were Never Really Here; David Ungaro – A Prayer Before Dawn
Best Editing	Best Effects
Nick Fenton, Julian Hart, Chris Gill – American Animals; Joe Bini – You Were Never Really Here; Marc Boucrot – A Prayer Before Dawn; Yorgos Mavropsaridis – The Favourite; Ben Wheatley – Happy New Year, Colin Burstead	Howard Jones – Early Man; Matthew Strange, Mark Wellband – Dead In A Week (or your money back); George Zwier, Paul Driver – Peterloo
Best Make Up & Hair Design	Best Music
Nadia Stacey – The Favourite; Christine Blundell – Peterloo; Mark Coulier, Jeremy Woodhead – Stan & Ollie; Stacey Louise Holman – A Prayer Before Dawn; Ivana Primorac – Colette	Jonny Greenwood – You Were Never Really Here; Aaron Cupples – Island Of The Hungry Ghosts; Richard Hawley – Funny Cow; Anne Nikitin – American Animals; Jim Williams – Beast
Best Production Design	Best Sound
Fiona Crombie – The Favourite; Michael Carlin – Colette; Suzie Davies – Peterloo; John Paul Kelly – Stan & Ollie; Beck Rainford – Ray & Liz	Paul Davies – You Were Never Really Here; Johnnie Burn – The Favourite; Séverin Favriau – A Prayer Before Dawn; CJ Mirra – Time Trial; Andrew Stirk – American Animals

=== Films with multiple nominations and awards ===
Films that received multiple nominations
Nominations	Film
13	The Favourite
11	American Animals
10	Beast
8	You Were Never Really Here
7	Stan & Ollie
6	Apostasy
5	Disobedience
5	A Prayer Before Dawn
4	Lean on Pete
4	Colette
4	Peterloo
3	Ray & Liz
3	Calibre
2	Funny Cow

Films that received multiple wins
Wins	Film
10	The Favourite
2	American Animals
2	Ray & Liz
2	You Were Never Really Here
