= The Other Bennet Sister (novel) =

2020 novel by Janice Hadlow

- Author: Janice Hadlow
- Genre: historical fiction
- Publisher: Henry Holt and Company
- Publication date: April 1, 2020
- ISBN: 978-1-250-12941-3

The Other Bennet Sister is a 2020 novel by Janice Hadlow. It is based on the novel Pride and Prejudice by Jane Austen, and follows the character of Mary Bennet. This was Hadlow's first novel following her previous non-fiction book. The novel was adapted into a television series of the same name that premiered in March 2026.

== Plot ==
The novel begins by retelling events from Pride and Prejudice from Mary Bennet’s perspective. Unlike her sisters, Mary is socially awkward, bookish and overshadowed by her sisters.

After the marriages of Jane and Elizabeth and the death of Mr Bennet, Mary's future becomes uncertain, forcing her to leave Longbourn and seek a new place in the world. She travels between her sisters’ households and eventually finds her way to the Gardiners, who empower her to accept herself for who and what she is and grow in confidence. She draws the attention of two suitors, Mr Hayward and Mr Ryder, but despite pressure from her mother to get married, Mary insists on finding happiness on her own terms.

== Adaptation ==
The novel was adapted into a television series by Bad Wolf and Sony Pictures Television, starring Ella Bruccoleri as Mary Bennet, Richard E. Grant as Mr Bennet and Ruth Jones as Mrs Bennet. It premiered on BBC One on 15 March 2026 with generally positive reviews.

== Reception ==
The novel was generally well reviewed. Writing in the Guardian, Jo Baker described the novel as an "engaging addendum" to the original book, which explores the predicament of overlooked Mary. "Hadlow builds an immersive and engaging new version of a familiar world; her approach feels at once true to the source material and to life."

In the Christian Science Monitor, reviewer Joan Gaylord said the novel stands on its own as a literary work. "[Hadlow] builds upon what Austen had achieved – writing boldly and honestly about women’s lives."

Review site Love London Love Culture said: "For anyone who has felt overlooked, this book will give you hope."
