= Andrew Michael Hurley =

British writer (born 1975)

Andrew Michael Hurley (born 1975) is a British writer whose debut novel, The Loney, was published in a limited edition of 350 copies on 1 October 2014 by Tartarus Press and was published under Hodder and Stoughton's John Murray imprint in 2015. He was interviewed on BBC Radio 4's Open Book programme "British Gothic" in October 2015.

== Early life and education ==
Hurley was born in 1975 in Preston, Lancashire and grew up there, spending holidays in Cumbria and Yorkshire "in the sort of rural, rugged landscapes dotted with smallholdings that he now writes about". He has said that at the age of ten he was obsessed with Tolkien, and that on family holidays he would look out for books of local ghost stories. He has worked as a teacher and a librarian.

== Literary career ==
Hurley had two volumes of short stories published by Lime Tree Press: Cages and Other Stories (2006) and The Unusual Death of Julie Christie and Other Stories (2008).

His debut novel, The Loney, was reviewed in The Guardian and The Telegraph. It is set in the area of Morecambe Bay in north west England, described in the text as "that strange nowhere between the Wyre and the Lune". Hurley has said that the novel's two starting points were "to write a kind of dark version of the Nativity [...] and exploring ideas of faith and belief" and "various wild, lonely places on the north west coast of Lancashire [...] a sense of imminent menace or dormant power lying just under the sand and the water". He has also described how the landscapes and placenames around Silverdale, further north on Morecambe Bay, influenced his writing. It is the winner of the 2015 Costa Book Award for First Novel as well as the British Book Industry Award for best debut fiction and book of the year.

His second novel, Devil's Day, was published on 19 October 2017 by John Murray and Tartarus Press Its setting, "The Endlands", is based on Langden valley in Lancashire's Forest of Bowland. The book "deploys myth, landscape and the tropes of horror to chilling effect". Hurley was joint winner of the Royal Society of Literature's 2018 Encore Award for best second novel.

Hurley's third novel Starve Acre was published 31 October 2019 by John Murray. The "Starve Acre" of the title is the home of a couple whose child has died, and it is "a novel which grapples with the irrationality and complexity of grief, the power and potency of folklore, and a moving examination of the effect a child's loss can have on its parents". The Guardian's critic described it as "an atmospheric tale in the same tradition of English folk-horror" as his previous two books. The film Starve Acre based on the book, was directed by Daniel Kokotajlo, starred Morfydd Clark and Matt Smith, and premiered at the BFI London Film Festival 2023.

His fourth novel, Barrowbeck was published on 24 October 2024 and comprises a collection of tales about the fictional village of Barrowbeck, on the Yorkshire-Lancashire border, across 1,000 years. A series of stories based in Barrowbeck were broadcast on BBC Radio 4 in 2022 under the title Voices in the Valley; readers included Maxine Peake, Reece Shearsmith, Toby Jones, Tamsin Greig and Jessica Raine.

Hurley's story "At the Rising of the Sun" was read by Stephen Campbell Moore in the BBC Radio 4 series Short Works in June 2025.

== Personal life ==
Hurley has been a lecturer in "creative writing (fiction)" at Manchester Metropolitan University since 2016. He lives in the Preston area, having previously lived in London and Manchester.

== Awards ==
Year	Title	Award	Category	Result	Ref
2015	The Loney	Costa Book Awards	First Novel	Won	
2015	The Loney	Waverton Good Read Award	—	Longlisted	
2016	The Loney	Authors' Club First Novel Award	—	Longlisted	
2016	The Loney	British Book Industry Awards	Book of the Year	Selected	
2016	The Loney	British Book Industry Awards	Debut Fiction	Selected	
2018	Devil's Day	Encore Award	—	Won	

== Selected publications ==
=== Novels ===
- The Loney (2014, Tartarus: ISBN 9781905784691; 2015, John Murray: ISBN 9781473619821)
- Devil's Day (2017, John Murray: ISBN 9781473619869; Tartarus: ISBN 9781905784981)
- Starve Acre (2019, John Murray: ISBN 9781529387261)
- Barrowbeck (2024, John Murray: ISBN 9781399817486)
- Saltwash (2025, John Murray: ISBN 9781399817561)

=== Collections ===
- Cages and Other Stories (2006, Lime Tree Press: ISBN 9781411699021)
- The Unusual Death of Julie Christie and Other Stories (2008, Lime Tree Press: ISBN 9780955981401)

=== Short stories ===
- "While The Nightjar Sleeps" (2021) in The Best British Short Stories 2017 (Salt Publishing: ISBN 9781784631123)
- "Katy" (2018) in Seaside Special – Postcards from the Edge (Blue Moose Books: ISBN 9781910422427)
- "Mr Lanyard's Last Case" (2018) in Eight Ghosts: The English Heritage Book of New Ghost Stories (September Publishing: ISBN 9781910463741)
- "Hunger" (2020) in Strange Tales: Tartarus Press at 30 (Tartarus: Limited edition or ebook)
- "Clavicle Wood" (2021) in Test Signal: Northern Anthology of New Writing (Bloomsbury: ISBN 9781526630902)
- "The Hanging of the Greens" (2021) in The Haunting Season: Ghostly Tales for Long Winter Nights (Sphere: ISBN 9780751581973)
- "The Old Play" (2023) in The Winter Spirits: Ghostly Tales for Festive Nights (Sphere: ISBN 9781408727584)
