= The Wonder (soundtrack) =

2022 film score

The Wonder (Soundtrack from the Netflix Film)

Film score by Matthew Herbert
- Released: 16 November 2022
- Recorded: 2022
- Genre: Film score
- Length: 35:21
- Label: Netflix Music
- Producer: Hugh Jones

Matthew Herbert chronology
The Responder (2022)	The Wonder (2022)	Starve Acre (2023)

The Wonder (Soundtrack from the Netflix Film) is the film score to the 2022 film The Wonder directed by Sebastián Lelio starring Florence Pugh. The film score is composed by Matthew Herbert and released through Netflix Music on 16 November 2022. Herbert won the British Independent Film Award for Best Music.

== Development ==
Matthew Herbert worked on the film score for The Wonder, after previously collaborating with Lelio on A Fantastic Woman, Disobedience (both 2017) and Gloria Bell (2018). As he was involved in the project very earlier, he received the script and started writing the score when the film began production. By the time shooting ended, Herbert developed a palette of sounds and ideas which Lelio could use as temp tracks for the first cut. Hence, it was considered a real luxury to shape the music so early and for it to be an integral part of the creative process.

Herbert discussed with Leiio for hours regarding the score. Their discussions involved the use of sounds like wind as there was a lot of wind on set and the idea of divinity and spiritual heaven. Since the story was dark and heavy, Lelio wanted the score to feel light and airy to keep things afloat and does not inflict traumatic behavior among audience. Instead, the music becomes a representation of how the divine spirits occupy the film and a combination of invisible spiritual world and the actual world on set. According to Herbert, the challenge is disturbing the stillness of the film where every sound and gesture enhances the picture or adds another layer or an additional context. With this film, any imbalance in gestures, instrumentation, melody would ruin the process. Since the score itself is a character in the film, he felt he had to balance the restraining nature of the quiteness with its score.

He wanted to use instruments and sounds that felt like the passing of air. Barring the use of violins or synthesizers, he used an accordion which he messed up with the sounds and then assembled a series of instruments powered by organs and harmoniums. Herbert further experimented with the use of sounds like the scaffolding on the film set, for which Herbert commissioned members from the sound team to make a series of sounds from scaffolding, that resulted in the toiling bell sound at the beginning. This provided a thematic idea, creating a motif that appears later again, as a part of reinforcing messages to the audience. Despite the Irish setting, Herbert went for a contemporary sound as traditional sounds were more familiar and provide less intrigue with the events happening in the film. He sampled several 18th-century period Irish instruments, which he slowed, twisted and processed. As he liked the idea of using the same instruments and technology, he built on sounds which would have been heard back then but deeply disguised and hidden. Though, it was not being a period film, the story had a modern resonance which was helped by the contemporary film scoring.

== Reception ==
According to Ben of Soundtrack Universe, "there's some fleeting moments of intrigue in Herbert's stark compositions though don't expect anything in The Wonder to leave a strong impression or feeling of needing to revisit its bleak, minimalist soundscape." Mark Kermode of The Guardian wrote "Matthew Herbert’s haunting seascape of a score swoops, clangs and swirls". Stephen Farber of The Hollywood Reporter wrote "The eerie musical score by Matthew Herbert contributes to the movie's impact." Brian Tallerico of RogerEbert.com called it "an excellent score by Lelio’s regular composer Matthew Herbert that avoids the lilt common to period pieces in favor of something more uncomfortable." Shannon Connellan of Mashable called it a "haunting score". Tim Grierson of Screen International called it an "anxiety-inducing percussive score".

Charlotte O'Sullivan of London Evening Standard called it "a shiver-inducing score". David Ehrlich of IndieWire wrote "Matthew Herbert’s strange and ingenious score, filled with loud whacks of percussion and wisps of ascendant human voices, adds to the sense of being surrounded by lost souls".

Tomris Laffly of TheWrap called it an "echoey score of dreamy sounds and pregnant screeches — the screaming sorts you’d perhaps hear in a dream or nature". Chris Evangelista of /Film wrote "Matthew Herbert's jarring, clanging, whisper-based score creates an off-kilter atmosphere; one that summons up a terrible feeling in the pit of your stomach." Clarisse Loughrey of The Independent wrote "Matthew Herbert’s score, jarringly but effectively modern in tone, rumbles away beneath like a digestive system of levers and gears."

== Track listing ==
No.	Title	Length
1.	"Calling"	3:38
2.	"Bent"	1:20
3.	"Frustration"	0:52
4.	"Shame"	1:06
5.	"Bent Again"	2:00
6.	"Thaumotrope"	1:08
7.	"Booties"	2:12
8.	"Collapse"	1:48
9.	"Revelation"	1:12
10.	"Until She Dies"	2:50
11.	"Kiss Her Again"	1:47
12.	"Going to Live"	1:30
13.	"Fiesta" (Burning Remix) (The Matthew Herbert Big Band)	2:58
14.	"Reunion"	6:29
15.	"Credits"	4:31
Total length:		35:21

== Personnel ==
Credits adapted from liner notes:

- Music composer – Matthew Herbert
- Music producer and sound designer – Hugh Jones
- Performer – London Contemporary Orchestra
- Orchestrators – Talia Morey, Hugh Brunt, Ananda Chatterjee
- Conductor – Hugh Brunt
- Copyist – Ananda Chatterjee
- Flute – Hunter Herbert
- Vocals – Allie Armstrong
- Engineer – Jeremy Murphy
- Recording and mixing – Graeme Stewart

== Accolades ==
Award	Date of ceremony	Category	Recipient(s)	Result	Ref.
British Independent Film Awards	4 December 2022	Best Original Music	Matthew Herbert	Won	
