= Peter Bradshaw =

British writer and film critic

- Bradshaw at the Cork International Short Story Festival in 2025
- Education: Haberdashers' Aske's Boys' School; University of Cambridge (BA, PhD)
- Occupations: Writer; film critic
- Years active: 1997–present
- Employers: The Guardian; Evening Standard
- Spouse: Caroline S. Hill
- Website: theguardian.com/profile/peterbradshaw

Peter Bradshaw is a British writer and film critic. He has been chief film critic at The Guardian since 1999, and is a contributing editor at Esquire magazine.

== Early life and education ==
Peter Bradshaw was educated at Haberdashers' Aske's Boys' School in Hertfordshire and studied English at Pembroke College, Cambridge, where he was president of the Cambridge Footlights. He was awarded a Bachelor of Arts degree in 1984, followed by postgraduate research into the Early Modern period, studying with Lisa Jardine and Anne Barton. He received his PhD in 1989.

== Career ==
In the 1990s, Bradshaw was employed by the Evening Standard as a columnist, and during the 1997 general election campaign, editor Max Hastings asked him to write a series of parodic diary entries purporting to be by the Conservative Party MP and historian Alan Clark, which Clark thought deceptive and which were the subject of a court case resolved in January 1998, the first in newspaper history in which the subject of a satire sued its author. Bradshaw was not put into the witness box by his QC Peter Prescott, and the judge Gavin Lightman found in Clark's favour, granting an injunction, deciding that Bradshaw's articles were then being published in a form that "a substantial number of readers" would believe they were genuinely being written by Alan Clark. Bradshaw found it "the most bizarre and surreal business of my professional life. I'm very flattered that Mr Clark should go to all this trouble and expense in suing me like this."

He wrote and performed a BBC Radio 4 programme entitled For One Horrible Moment, recorded on 10 October 1998 and first broadcast on 20 January 1999, which chronicled a young man's coming of age in 1970s Cambridgeshire. Bradshaw's bittersweet short story "Reunion", first broadcast on BBC Radio 4 on 21 October 2016, was narrated by Tom Hollander and was described in a New Statesman review as "sad and sly, and connected impermeably to the mid-Seventies and what it felt like to be young". Another short story, entitled "Neighbours of Zero", first broadcast on Radio 4 on 17 November 2017, was narrated by Daniel Mays. Bradshaw's story "Senior Moment", first broadcast on Radio 4's Short Works strand on 22 May 2020, was narrated by Michael Maloney.

In 1999 Bradshaw was appointed chief film critic for The Guardian. He co-wrote and acted in David Baddiel's television sitcom Baddiel's Syndrome, first aired on Sky One in January 2001.

He was on the Un Certain Regard jury for 2011 Cannes Film Festival.

Bradshaw wrote an audiobook called Mercy, which was released as an Audible Original in January 2026, starring Joanna Scanlan.

He is a regular guest reviewer on the Film... programme broadcast on BBC One. As of July 2026 he remains film critic at The Guardian.

== Awards and recognition ==
Bradshaw has been shortlisted four times for The Press Awards in the Critic of the Year category: 2001, 2007, 2012 and 2013 when he was "Highly Commended".

At the 2024 Cannes Film Festival, Bradshaw was presented with the Annual Achievement Award for an International Film Critic by the Arab Cinema Center.

== Favourite films ==
In a 2022 Sight & Sound poll of cinema's greatest films, Bradshaw indicated that his ten favourites are:

- The Addiction (US, 1995)
- Boyhood (US, 2014)
- Annie Hall (US, 1977)
- Black Narcissus (UK, 1947)
- Zama (Argentina, 2017)
- Vagabond (France, 1985)
- In the Mood for Love (Hong Kong, 2000)
- Kind Hearts and Coronets (UK, 1949)
- Raging Bull (US, 1980)
- Singin' in the Rain (US, 1952)

== Bibliography ==
- Not Alan Clark's Diary; London: Simon & Schuster, 1998
- Lucky Baby Jesus; London: Little, Brown and Company, 1999
- Dr Sweet and His Daughter; London: Picador, 2003
- Night of Triumph; London, Duckworth Books, 2013
- The Films that Made Me...; London: Bloomsbury Publishing, 2019
- The Body in the Mobile Library and Other Stories; Lightning Books, 2024
