= Sarah Quintrell =

English writer and actress

Sarah Quintrell (born in Lambeth, London) is a British screenwriter and producer, best known for her work on The Other Bennet Sister and The Power. Quintrell was BAFTA nominated for her writing debut feature, the single Channel 4 drama Ellen in 2017.

== Career ==
=== Acting ===
Quintrell started her career as an actor and had a varied career on stage. Quintrell was the original Bobbie in Mike Kenny's The Railway Children at York Theatre Royal. She transferred with the production to London Waterloo Station, where it won the Olivier Award for Best Entertainment (2011). She has also played Eliza Doolittle in Pygmalion (2005). Other theatre includes Celia in As You Like It, Forty Years On and new writing including AgeSexLocation, Bloodtide and playing Natalie in James Phillips's City Stories, which had a residency in 2015 at The Other Palace theatre, London. She transferred with the production to 59East59 Theater in New York as part of Brits Off Broadway and reprised the role at Crazy Coqs, Brasserie Zedel, London, in 2018.

Quintrell played Sinéad in the BBC TV sitcom Carrie and Barry. She also appeared in several major British series, such as Rillington Place, Call the Midwife, Doctor Who and Lewis.

=== Writing ===
Quintrell's writing debut, Ellen, was broadcast on Channel 4. Directed by Mahalia Belo and starring Jessica Barden, Yasmin Monet Prince, Jaime Winstone, Joe Dempsie and Charlie Creed-Miles. Ellen won the Broadcast Television Award Best Single Drama, Writers' Guild Great Britain Best Short Form Drama, BAFTA Cymru Feature/Television Film and the Prix Italia TV Drama. Quintrell was nominated for the BAFTA Breakthrough Talent Award at the 2017 BAFTA Craft Awards. In 2017, Quintrell was named as one of the 2017-2018 cohort of BAFTA Breakthrough Brits.

The Trial: A Murder In The Family was broadcast on Channel 4. Directed by Kath Mattock and Nick Holt, starring Michael Gould, Emma Lowndes and Laura Elphinstone. Using a fictional case, written by Quintrell, it allowed cameras into a jury room for the first time and blended documentary and drama to allow the story to unfold across five episodes. In 2018 it was nominated for Best Original Programme at the Broadcast Awards. Quintrell co-wrote alongside Jack Thorne on Season 2 of His Dark Materials for BBC/HBO. She co-developed, wrote and co-executive produced science fiction drama The Power for Amazon Prime in 2023.

In October 2024, the BBC commissioned The Other Bennet Sister, based on the novel of the same name by Janice Hadlow, written by Quintrell. The show aired in March 2026 on BBC and BBC iPlayer and on Britbox in the US in May 2026. The series became a ratings success, with Episode 1 drawing in a 'consolidated' figure of 7.3 million viewers. It also marked the UK's biggest drama launch since May 2025 across all platforms.

== Awards ==
- 2017: Writers' Guild Great Britain for Best Short Form Drama (Winner) - Ellen
- 2017: BAFTA Television Craft Awards for Breakthrough Talent (nomination) - Ellen
- 2017: BAFTA Cymru Feature/Television Film (Winner) - Ellen
- 2017: Prix Italia TV Drama (Winner) - Ellen
- 2017: Broadcast Award Single Drama (Winner) - Ellen
- 2018 The Trial: A Murder in the Family - nominated for Best Original Programme at the Broadcast Awards 2018.
- 2018 The Trial: A Murder in the Family - nominated for Best Documentary Series at the Televisual Bulldog Awards.
- 2018 The Trial: A Murder in the Family - received a Silver World Medal at the New York Film Festivals.
