= The Other Bennet Sister =

2026 British television series

- Release poster
- Genre: Period drama
- Based on: The Other Bennet Sister by Janice Hadlow
- Written by: Sarah Quintrell; Maddie Dai
- Directed by: Jennifer Sheridan; Asim Abbasi
- Starring: Ella Bruccoleri; Ruth Jones; Richard E. Grant; Maddie Close; Poppy Gilbert; Grace Hogg-Robinson; Molly Wright; Indira Varma; Richard Coyle; Dónal Finn; Laurie Davidson; Lucy Briers; Tanya Reynolds; Varada Sethu
- Composer: Anne Chmelewsky
- Country of origin: United Kingdom
- Original language: English
- No. of series: 1
- No. of episodes: 10

Production
- Executive producers: Janice Hadlow; Sarah Quintrell; Dan McCulloch; Kate Crowther; Becca Kinder; Jane Tranter; Rebecca Ferguson; Jess O'Riordan
- Producer: John Pocock
- Cinematography: Luke Bryant; Simona Susnea
- Editors: Sara Jones; Rebecca Trotman; Lucy Harris; Emily Lawrence
- Running time: 30 mins.
- Production companies: Bad Wolf; Sony Pictures Television

Original release
- Network: BBC One
- Release: 15 March 2026 – present

The Other Bennet Sister is a British period drama television series produced by Bad Wolf for BBC One. It is an adaptation of the novel of the same name by Janice Hadlow, a continuation of Jane Austen's Pride and Prejudice, and follows Ella Bruccoleri as Mary Bennet, Dónal Finn as Mr Hayward and Laurie Davidson as Mr Ryder. Other cast members include Ruth Jones and Richard E. Grant as Mrs and Mr Bennet. The series premiered on 15 March 2026. In June 2026, a three-part Christmas special was announced.

== Premise ==
The first two episodes of the series detail the events of Pride and Prejudice from the point of view of Mary Bennet, the overlooked sister from the large Bennet family. The rest of the story follows Mary as she travels to London and the Lake District on a journey of self-discovery and romance.

== Cast and characters ==
=== Main ===
- Ella Bruccoleri as Mary Bennet
- Ruth Jones as Mrs Bennet
- Richard E. Grant as Mr Bennet
- Maddie Close as Jane Bingley (née Bennet)
- Poppy Gilbert as Elizabeth Darcy (née Bennet)
- Grace Hogg-Robinson as Lydia Wickham (née Bennet)
- Molly Wright as Kitty Buncock (née Bennet)
- Indira Varma as Mrs Gardiner
- Richard Coyle as Mr Gardiner
- Dónal Finn as Thomas Hayward
- Laurie Davidson as William Ryder
- Lucy Briers as Mrs Hill
- Tanya Reynolds as Caroline Bingley
- Varada Sethu as Ann Baxter

=== Recurring ===
- Victor Pilard as Fitzwilliam Darcy
- Aled Owens as Charles Bingley
- Aaron Gill as John Sparrow
- Ryan Sampson as Mr Collins
- Anna Fenton-Garvey as Charlotte Collins (née Lucas)
- Lucinda Dryzek as Louisa Hurst (née Bingley)
- Róisín Bhalla as Marianne Gardiner
- Reggie Absolom as George Gardiner
- Jasmine Sharp as Rebecca Gardiner
- Fergus Craig as Mr Hurst
- Seán Carlsen as Sir William Lucas
- Jethro Weyman as Gardiner Servant

== Production ==
=== Development ===
The ten-part series is adapted by Sarah Quintrell from the 2020 novel of the same name by Janice Hadlow, based around the character Mary Bennet from the Jane Austen novel Pride and Prejudice, with Maddie Dai also writing an episode. It is lead directed by Jennifer Sheridan.

It is produced by Bad Wolf, for whom Dan McCulloch developed the project. Quintrell and Hadlow are executive producers with Kate Crowther, Becca Kinder and Jane Tranter as executive producers for Bad Wolf, and Rebecca Ferguson as executive producer for the BBC. Sony Pictures Television has global rights. In May 2025, BritBox was announced as co-producer, with broadcasting rights in the U.S. and Canada.

On 24 June 2026, the BBC announced that a three-part Christmas special had been commissioned.

=== Casting ===
In May 2025, Ella Bruccoleri was announced as leading the cast in the role of Mary Bennet. The following month, Ruth Jones, Richard E. Grant, Richard Coyle and Indira Varma joined the cast, as well as Roisin Bhalla, Reggie Absolom and Jasmine Sharp, Laurie Davidson, Dónal Finn and Varada Sethu with Aaron Gill, Maddie Close, Poppy Gilbert, Molly Wright, Grace Hogg-Robinson, Tanya Reynolds, Anna Fenton-Garvey and Ryan Sampson. The cast also includes Lucy Briers, who had played Mary Bennet in the 1995 adaptation of Pride and Prejudice.

=== Filming ===
Principal photography took place in Bristol and Wales in June 2025. Newport, particularly its Market Arcade, was used to film several London scenes. The outdoors Lake District scenes were instead filmed in Brecon Beacons and the Black Mountains. Other filming locations included Dyffryn House and Gardens and St Fagans Folk Museum in Wales and Berkeley Square, Brandon Hill, Orchard Street and Frog Lane in Bristol. The Pemberley scenes were filmed at Badminton House.

Filming for the three-part Christmas special took place in the summer of 2026, primarily in Wales, and was completed by the start of September.

== Episodes ==
No.	Title	Directed by	Written by	Original release date	Viewers (millions)
1	"Chapter 1"	Jennifer Sheridan	Sarah Quintrell	15 March 2026	4.71
As the plain and overlooked middle sister, Mary Bennet lives at Longbourn with her sisters and her parents, desperately longing for their approval. When she gets glasses, her mother and sisters pronounce that they look vile and that she will never find a husband. Later on, the Meryton assembly ball provides a chance for Mary to move in society, and even a first taste of romance. However, her hopes are quickly dashed by her mother's interference. Unaware of social expectations, she dances twice with her optician, after which her mother forbids her stand up with such an unsuitable man again. This results into sadness and disappointment, which make Mary resort to a life of reason with a focus on reading, learning and musical accomplishment.
2	"Chapter 2"	Jennifer Sheridan	Sarah Quintrell	15 March 2026	4.34
When Mr Bennet’s distant cousin, the foolish & socially awkward Mr Collins, arrives at Longbourn, things are thrown into disarray. Mr Collins is to inherit the estate, and since the Bennet's only have daughters, their fates seem to be sealed, which sends Mrs Bennet into a match-making frenzy. At Mr. Bingley's ball at Netherfield, Mary musters the courage to sing and play the piano, which results in humiliation. When Lizzy spurns Mr Collins's advances, Mrs Bennet urges Mary to pursue him, although having warned her off earlier. However, this comes to nothing when Mr Collins becomes engaged to Charlotte Lucas instead. At the Netherfield ball, Charlotte had asked Mary why her mother was so determined that one of her daughters should marry a man of limited means, and Mary had revealed that Mr Collins was next in line to inherit the family’s valuable home upon Mr Bennet’s death. While Mary was busy at the piano, Charlotte was seen befriending Mr Collins and beginning to pursue him.
3	"Chapter 3"	Jennifer Sheridan	Sarah Quintrell	22 March 2026	5.03
After the sudden death of Mr Bennet, Mary and Mrs Bennet find themselves precisely in the situation they had dreaded. Not long after his death, Mr Collins arrives at Longbourn with Charlotte Lucas. He informs them that, as he is the rightful heir to the estate, they have weeks to pack their belongings and move out. This leads to Jane inviting Mrs Bennet to stay with her and Mr Bingley, while Mary receives an unexpected offer to stay with her uncle and aunt, the Gardiners, as governess to their children in London. Reluctant at first, Mary quickly finds a certain freedom and joy living with the Gardiners. She meets a young barrister & friend of the Gardiners called Tom Hayward, a kindred spirit and a new friend, and also makes friends with Ann Baxter, with whom Mr Hayward has an 'understanding'.
4	"Chapter 4"	Jennifer Sheridan	Maddie Dai	22 March 2026	4.87
Just as Mary is finding her footing and confidence in London, she overhears a conversation among the Gardiners which knocks her back. When Mary shares that she does not care much for poetry as 'they're just words', Mr Hayward brings her and the Gardiners to a hidden garden in full bloom where he recites Wordsworth's "Composed upon Westminster Bridge". Mary finds herself unexpectedly moved by his words but remains concerned about his attachment to Miss Baxter, which makes her consider accepting her mother's summons to join her at Pemberley. However, after she gives the children a lesson about poetry, and with the encouragement of Mrs Gardiner, Mary decides to stay in London a little longer. The Gardiners organise a games evening where Mary meets a certain William Ryder and the evening ends with her winning the game of riddles.
5	"Chapter 5"	Jennifer Sheridan	Sarah Quintrell	29 March 2026	5.31
Miss Baxter helps Mary to get ready for an upcoming ball. At the ball, she dances with both Mr Hayward and Mr Ryder. Mr Hayward seems displeased with the interest that Mr Ryder shows for Mary. Caroline Bingley appears at the ball, flirts with Mr Ryder, and is rude to Mary. Mr Ryder invites Mary to a supper party at his house. The next day, Mrs Gardiner encourages Mary not to take Miss Bingley's cruelness to heart. At the dinner, Mr Ryder continues to show interest in Mary, while Miss Bingley tries to thwart any sort of relationship between the two by changing the seating arrangement and placing herself next to Mr Ryder. At dinner Mary is left with no one to talk to, but then successfully engages a rather reserved Mr. Hurst – Miss Bingley's brother-in-law – in a lively conversation about horses. After this, Miss Bingley warns Mary against pursuing Mr Ryder romantically. Mr Hayward explicitly expresses concern about Mr Ryder's interest to Mary. Before Miss Bingley tries to force Mary into singing in front of everyone, in hopes of humiliating her, she receives news from Pemberley that her mother has fallen gravely ill.
6	"Chapter 6"	Asim Abbasi	Sarah Quintrell	29 March 2026	4.47
Mary returns to Pemberley to support her mother but instead finds herself thrown back into the familiar demands of family life. Mary begins to feel like the progress she's made in London is fading until Mr Ryder unexpectedly turns up at Pemberley, expressing his concerns for her mother's health. His infatuation with Mary helps her family to recognise how much she has changed during her time in London, much to her mother's astonishment and her sisters' fascination. Mr Ryder then presents Mary with a most unconventional offer.
7	"Chapter 7"	Asim Abbasi	Sarah Quintrell	5 April 2026	5.14
Mr Ryder's offer leaves Mary in a difficult position. She tries to work out what it is that she truly desires or whether she must disappoint her mother once again. Both Lizzy and Mr Collins - who shows unexpected understanding of how he is perceived by others - help her understand that her happiness is in her own hands. Before she can explain her reasons for declining Mr Ryder's offer, the Gardiners unexpectedly arrive at Pemberley and invite Mary to join them on a trip to the Lake District.
8	"Chapter 8"	Asim Abbasi	Sarah Quintrell	5 April 2026	5.02
En route to the Lake District, Mary crosses paths with Miss Baxter, who informs her that she and Mr Hayward have broken off their 'understanding' and that she is marrying someone else. When they arrive at the Lakes, Mr Hayward joins Mary and the Gardiners for breakfast at their inn. The group enjoy fishing by Scafell Pike and agree to climb the mountain the next day. Mary and Mr Hayward continue to reconnect over their shared love of nature and poetry, during which Mr Hayward and Mary attempt to specific bird calls. Mr Hayward attempts to make Mary laugh by discreetly showing her his drawings of birds. At the moment that he seems close to making Mary an offer of marriage, Mr Ryder suddenly appears, seeking urgent legal advice from Mr Hayward, which ruins Mr Hayward's plan. Disgruntled, Mr Hayward expresses his wish to have time alone with Mary on the next day’s climb and to continue their conversation on the summit. At the inn, Mary is surprised to find that Caroline Bingley and the Hursts have also come for a stay. Over dinner, Mr Ryder invites himself and the others to join Mary, Mr Hayward and the Gardiners for the mountain climb and tells Mary that he will "make amends" to her when they reach the summit.
9	"Chapter 9"	Asim Abbasi	Sarah Quintrell	12 April 2026	5.63
The following day, the group hike up Scafell Pike with a local guide. When the Hursts struggle to keep up, the Gardiners offer to accompany them back down, while Mary, Mr Hayward, Miss Bingley and Mr Ryder continue up the mountain. At the summit, Mr Hayward finally has a private moment with Mary but as he is about to propose, Mr Ryder insists on talking to Mr Hayward about his change in financial affairs. After they conclude their conversation, Mr Hayward becomes stand-offish and distances himself from the others. The weather starts to change for the worse, and the guide strongly advises they should leave before an upcoming storm. However, the group decides to remain despite strong protest from Mr Hayward. As the storm arrives, they all start to regret their decision and try to make their way down the mountain, but lose track of each other in the process. Mr Ryder is nowhere to be seen, Caroline Bingley slips and traps her foot under a boulder and Mary comes back to help her. They comes across Mr Hayward, who decides to carry Miss Bingley to the inn. Once they arrive at the inn, Mary collapses and is tended to by Mrs Gardiner for several days while Mr Hayward waits outside her bedroom. The others depart with Mr Ryder accompanying Miss Bingley back to London. After a while, Mary finally begins to recover. Having heard this, Mr Hayward decides to leave her without saying goodbye.
10	"Chapter 10"	Asim Abbasi	Sarah Quintrell	12 April 2026	5.62
Mary returns with the Gardiners to London. Her mother arrives determined to find Mary a husband but, to her dismay, fails to find a suitable match for her last remaining single daughter. One day, Mr Ryder arrives to talk to Mary. He reveals that, during their conversation on Scafell Pike, he told Mr Hayward he had been named Lady Catherine de Bourgh's heir and intended to propose to Mary, taking into account his newfound wealth. Appreciative of their friendship, Mary firmly declines his proposal, telling him she does not love him. Her mother admonishes her, but a courageous Mary stands up to her and chooses to find happiness on her own terms. Mrs Bennet then shares her agony and sorrows of having five daughters, none of whom would inherit the estate. Mary shows her empathy, but stands firmly with beliefs, after which Mrs Bennet angrily leaves. She continues to enjoy her life in London with the Gardiners and begins working as a governess for other families as well, mainly teaching young women science. She is also seen writing her own book called 'Advice for Young Women', showing that she finally accepts herself and the path she chose for herself. After a while, Mr Hayward returns unannounced and states his unchanged feelings for Mary. Although she is happy to see him, she also demands an explanation as to why he left her without answering any of her letters. Mr Hayward then explains that he felt like Mr Ryder had more to offer her, since he is to inherit the fortune of Lady Catherine de Bourgh, while he has had to work hard for all his earnings and that he was 'reading between the lines'. Shocked at this revelation, Mary punches Mr Hayward on the arm, much to his surprise, emotionally exclaiming that he should not have decided her fate for her and that 'there were no lines!'. They then both admit that they love each other. Mr Hayward informs her that, of all people, Caroline Bingley informed him that Mary had turned down Mr Ryder's proposal and that she has followed him to Italy to pursue him further. Mary accepts Mr Hayward's proposal, and the two get married. At last, their engagement party is shown and they are seen in their own house with Mary playfully correcting Mr Hayward, whom she now refers to as Thomas, telling him 'to keep up', showing that although she has evolved and learned a lot since being in London, that she stayed true to herself.

== Broadcast ==
The first five episodes premiered on 15 March 2026 on BBC One and BBC iPlayer. The remaining five episodes premiered on 29 March 2026. In the United States, the show premiered on 6 May 2026 on BritBox.

== Reception ==
The series became a ratings hit, with episode one drawing in a consolidated 28 days figure of 7.3 million viewers. It also marks the BBC's biggest drama launch since May 2025.

On the review aggregator website Rotten Tomatoes, 97% of 37 critics' reviews are positive, with an average rating of 7.6/10. The website's consensus reads: "Cozy, charming, and full of heart, The Other Bennet Sister gives Mary her moment to shine, thanks to Ella Bruccoleri's delightful performance and a fresh take on Jane Austen's familiar world." Metacritic, which uses a weighted average, assigned the series a score of 80 out of 100, based on 14 critics, indicating "generally favorable" reviews.

In a five-star review for The Telegraph, Anita Singh described it as "a thing of pure delight". In a three-star review for The Guardian, Lucy Mangan found it "too slight a thing even for the pre-watershed Sunday evening slot", but concluded that "the growing charm and heft ... make it one worth sticking with".

=== Impact ===
The BBC reported that tourism to historic sites related to Jane Austen, particularly in Bath, had increased following the release of the series.

=== Accolades ===
The series was nominated in the New Drama category at the 31st National Television Awards, with Bruccoleri nominated for Drama Performance.
