= Molly Wright (actress) =

English actress (born 1996)

- Born: Molly Florence Wright; 20 March 1996 (age 30); Blackpool, England
- Years active: 2016–present

Molly Florence Wright (born 20 March 1996) is an English actress. For her debut film Apostasy (2017), she was named Young British/Irish Performer of the Year by the London Film Critics' Circle and nominated for two British Independent Film Awards. On television, she is known for her role in the BBC series The A Word (2016–2020) and The Other Bennet Sister (2026).

== Early life ==
Wright is from Blackpool. She attended the Blackpool Sixth Form College. She then took the Foundation Acting course at the Academy of Live and Recorded Arts (ALRA) and joined an extras' agency to earn money.

== Career ==
Wright made her television debut when she began starring in the BBC One drama The A Word as Rebecca Hughes, a role she would play for all three series from 2016 to 2020. Also in 2016, she played Lulu Lane in the second series of the military drama Our Girl, also on BBC One.

The following year, Wright made her feature film debut as Alex Whitling in Apostasy, which premiered at the 2017 Toronto International Film Festival. Wright won the London Film Critics Circle Award for Young British/Irish Actor of the Year and received nominations for two British Independent Film Awards and two National Film Awards in the supporting actress and newcomer categories.

== Filmography ==
=== Film ===
Year	Title	Role	Notes
2017	Apostasy	Alex Whitling	
2019	Nowhere Fast	Carrie	Short film
2020	Three Minutes of Silence	Tisha	Short film

=== Television ===
Year	Title	Role	Notes
2016–2020	The A Word	Rebecca Hughes	Main role
2016	Our Girl	Lulu Lane	4 episodes (series 2)
2021	Casualty	Rosie Kemper	2 episodes
2023	The Long Shadow	Donna Deangelo	1 episode
2026	The Other Bennet Sister	Kitty Buncock (née Bennet)	5 episodes
TBA	Gandhi		

== Awards and nominations ==
Year	Award	Category	Work	Result	Ref.
2018	British Independent Film Awards	Best Supporting Actress	Apostasy	Nominated	
2018	British Independent Film Awards	Most Promising Newcomer	Apostasy	Nominated	
2019	London Film Critics' Circle Awards	Young British/Irish Performer of the Year	Apostasy	Won	
2019	National Film Awards UK	Best Supporting Actress	Apostasy	Nominated	
2019	National Film Awards UK	Best Newcomer	Apostasy	Nominated	
