= Bennet family =

Fictional family

- Pride and Prejudice character
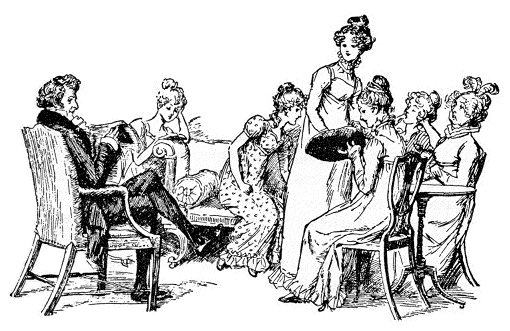
- The Bennet family at Longbourn, by Hugh Thomson. Illustration for chapter II (1894).

In-universe information
- Full name: Bennet
- Occupation: Landed gentry
- Family: Mr Bennet and Mrs Bennet
- Children: Jane, Elizabeth, Mary, Catherine, Lydia
- Home: Longbourn House in the village of Longbourn, Meryton, in Hertfordshire

The Bennet family is a fictional family created by the English novelist Jane Austen in her 1813 novel Pride and Prejudice. The family consists of Mr and Mrs Bennet and their five daughters: Jane, Mary, Catherine, Lydia, and Elizabeth, who is the novel's protagonist.

The family belongs to the landed gentry of Hertfordshire in the Regency era of English history. The relationships between the Bennets influence the evolution of the plot as they navigate the difficulties faced by young women in attempting to secure a good future through marriage.

== Estate ==
The Bennet estate, Longbourn House, consists of a residence and land located within the environs of the fictional town of Meryton, in Hertfordshire, just north of London. From his family estate, Mr Bennet derives an annual income of £2,000. Longbourn has an entailment upon it, meant to keep the estate intact and in the sole possession of the family, down the male line, rather than being divided amongst younger sons and any daughters; it is to be passed down amongst first male heirs only. This legal restriction could only remain valid if renewed in each generation by a strict settlement, usually entered into by each heir to an estate on attaining their majority. Mr Bennet is understood to have entered into such a settlement himself before his marriage, but, at the time that the events of the book take place, he wishes to end the entail entirely. For years, Mr and Mrs Bennet had hoped to raise a son who, on reaching age 21, would join with Mr Bennet in barring the entail by common recovery in an agreement that would provide income for him, his widow, and any other children they might have. Mr Bennet does not get along with his then-closest living male relative, his distant cousin Mr Collins (Sr.), who is described as an "illiterate miser", and does not want the estate to be given to him. After 23 years of marriage, Mr Bennet remains the last male scion of the older branch of the Bennet family, meaning that the estate will pass in default according the strict settlement, to the nearest direct male descendent in the younger branch, now represented by Mr William Collins, rector of Hunsford; Mr Collins (Sr.) having recently died.

== Paternal branch ==
The book does not elaborate on the ancestors of Mr Bennet besides mentioning that neither his father nor grandfather is still living. The only family mentioned in the book is the Collins family--a father and son--who are described as Mr Bennet's "distant" cousins.

=== Mr Bennet ===
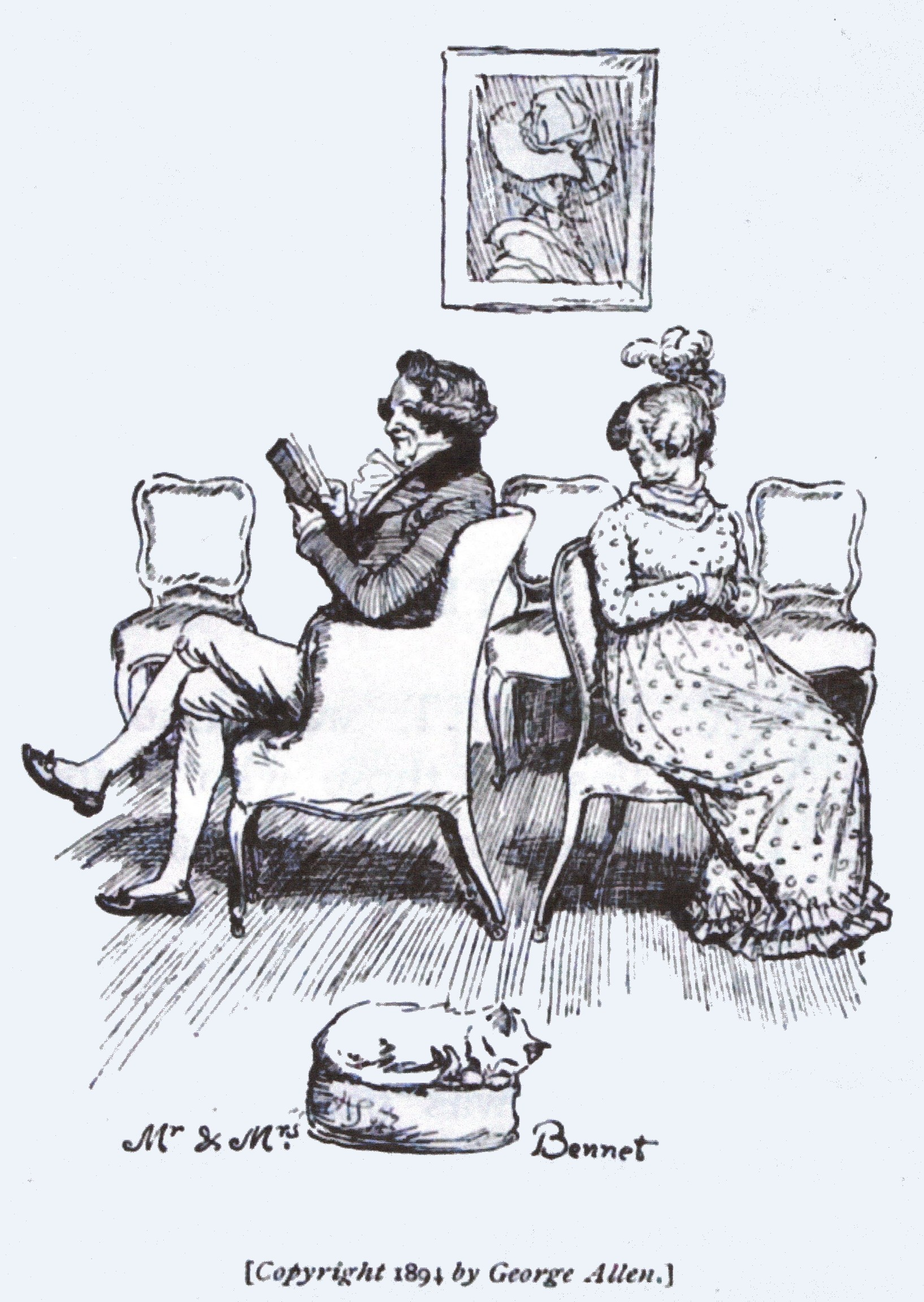
Mr and Mrs Bennet by Hugh Thomson, 1894

Mr Bennet, the patriarch of the Bennet family, is a landed gentleman. He is married to Mrs Bennet, the daughter of a Meryton attorney (the late Mr Gardiner Sr.), who brought £5,000 into the marriage as her marriage settlement. Together they have five daughters: Jane, Elizabeth ("Lizzy"), Mary, Catherine ("Kitty"), and Lydia. None of the daughters are married at the beginning of the novel. The property constituting Mrs Bennet's marriage settlement is not incorporated into the Longbourn estate; and so would not be covered by the legal entail, but could be disposed of amongst the daughters following the deaths of Mr and Mrs Bennet. Mr Bennet had entered into a strict settlement before his marriage which, had he had sisters and brothers, would then have provided dowries and portions for them; but apparently did not then also include provision from the Longbourn estate for marriage portions for future daughters yet to be born to the couple; as these are expected to be specified in a counterpart strict settlement at their son and heir's coming of age. But as the Bennet's do not have a son and heir, so there is now no possibility of the estate paying dowries for the Bennet's five daughters. As a result of this, young men were dissuaded from marrying her daughters.

Mrs Bennet is eager to find husbands for her daughters. Mr Bennet makes no effort to change the behaviour of his wife or his younger daughters, being more intent on "enjoying the show".

==== Characterisation ====
Mr Bennet is described in his first appearance in the book as "so odd a mixture of quick parts, sarcastic humour, reserve, and caprice, that the experience of three and twenty years had been insufficient to make his wife understand his character," and it is this same ironic, cynical, dry, wry sense of humour that irritates his wife.

The narrator points out Mr Bennet's many acts of negligence regarding his duties as husband and father. If he draws the sympathy of the reader by his skill at irony, he has nevertheless faults: indifferent and irresponsible, self-centered, stubborn, indolent, and a dislike of company. Mr Bennet admits he married a silly girl, but he has, for his part, largely given up his social role as pater familias. His disengagement is symbolised by his withdrawing into his library and hiding behind cynical mockery.

Although Mr Bennet is portrayed as an intelligent man, his indolence, lethargy, and indifference results in him opting to spend his free time ridiculing the weaknesses of others (ironically) rather than addressing his own problems. His irresponsibility in not saving from his income places his family in the position of being potentially homeless and resourceless when he dies. He recognises this but does nothing.

He regards the world with an ironic detachment. When he is involved in a social event, such as the ball at Netherfield, he is a silent and amused witness of the blunders of his family. Even the discovery of Darcy's role in Lydia's marriage only draws an exclamation of relief from him: "So much the better. It will save me a world of trouble and economy."

==== Relationship with his wife ====
Mr Bennet has a closer relationship with Mrs Bennet's "poor nerves" than Mrs Bennet herself, referring to them as his old friends, stating: "You mistake me, my dear. I have a high respect for your nerves. They are my old friends. I have heard you mention them with consideration these twenty years at least."

In volume 2, chapter 19, it is revealed that Mr Bennet had only married his wife based on an initial attraction to her:

[Mr Bennet] captivated by youth and beauty, and that appearance of good humour, which youth and beauty generally give, had married a woman, whose weak understanding, and illiberal mind, had, very early in the marriage, put an end to any real affection for her. Respect, esteem, and confidence, had vanished forever; and all of his views of domestic happiness were overthrown. But Mr Bennet was not of a disposition to seek 'comfort' for the disappointment which his own imprudence had brought on, in any of those pleasures which too often console the unfortunate of their folly or vice. He was fond of the country and of books, and from these tastes had arisen his principal enjoyments.

Mr Bennet openly favours Jane and Elizabeth due to their steadier temperaments; he actively distances himself from his wife and younger daughters' anxieties and frivolities whenever possible.

==== Relationship with Elizabeth ====
Elizabeth and Mr Bennet have a close bond, which is apparent to everyone in the family. Mrs Bennet, in one of her many quasi-hysterical moments, turns on her husband and exclaims: "I desire you will do no such thing. Lizzy is not a bit better than the others, and I am sure she is not half so handsome as Jane, nor half so good-humoured as Lydia. But you are always giving her the preference," to which he replies; "They have none of them much to recommend them ... they are all silly and ignorant like other girls, but Lizzy has something more of quickness than her sisters."

Despite the fact that his daughter must marry in order to be able to continue living the life of a gentlewoman, Mr Bennet appears, for the most part, unconcerned. He supports Elizabeth's rejection of Mr Collins’ marriage proposal due to his dislike of the man and the differences in his and Elizabeth's personalities. This conflicts with his wife's opinion, as she is furious with Elizabeth for ruining their family's chance at financial security.

== Maternal branch ==
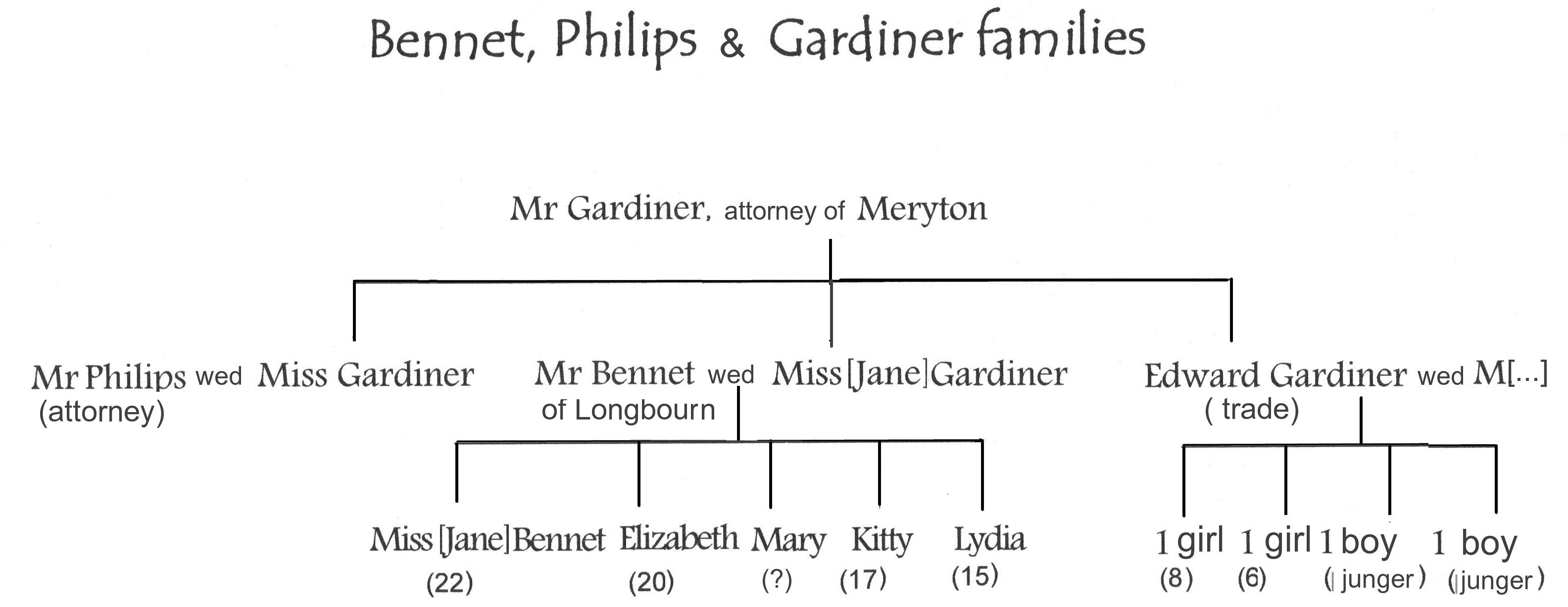
The three Gardiners from Meryton: Mrs Philips, Mrs Bennet, Mr Gardiner.

Mrs Bennet, born a Gardiner and married for twenty-three years at the start of the novel, is the daughter of an attorney in Meryton. She has a brother and a sister, both married. Though equally vulgar, ignorant, thoughtless, tasteless and gossipy, the marriages of the two sisters have resulted in them moving in different circles: one (Mrs Bennet) marries a member of the local gentry, and the other (Mrs Phillips) marries one of her late father's law clerks, while their naturally genteel brother pursues an education and a higher social status in general trade in London.

=== Mrs Bennet ===
Mrs Bennet (née Gardiner) is the middle-aged wife of her social superior, Mr Bennet, and the mother of their five daughters.

Mrs Bennet is described in the book as frivolous and very "silly" ("[Mrs Bennet's] mind was less difficult to develop. She was a woman of mean understanding, little information, and uncertain temper. When she was discontented, she fancied herself nervous. The business of her life was to get her daughters married; its solace was visiting and news' ... [Mr Bennet], captivated by youth and beauty, and that appearance of good humour, which youth and beauty generally give, had married a woman, whose weak understanding, and illiberal mind, had, very early in the marriage, put an end to any real affection for her").

She is susceptible to attacks of "tremors and palpitations", which occur whenever she is defensive or displeased. She is also prone to flights of fancy, flights of pique and melodrama, believing herself to regularly ill-used, talking loudly of it.

Her personal fortune inherited from her father amounted to £4,000 which was sufficient money for an individual of her condition, but it was not enough to support her children as well. In addition, she has a life interest in her marriage settlement of £5,000, invested in 4% funds, the capital for which is bound by the terms of the settlement to be distributed to her children at her death.

==== Relationships with her daughters ====
Her favourite daughter is her youngest, Lydia, who takes very much after her. After Lydia, her next favourite is her eldest, Jane, although she primarily values her for her great physical beauty, rarely considering Jane's feelings. Her least favourite daughter is Elizabeth (closely followed by Mary) whom she does not understand (or like) at all; when Mr Collins was directing his "enraptured heart" at Elizabeth, Mrs Bennet thought them both together a perfect match purely because she does not like either of them:

Of having [Elizabeth] married to Mr. Collins, [Mrs. Bennet] thought with equal certainty, and with considerable, though not equal, pleasure. Elizabeth was the least dear to her of all her children; and though the man and the match were quite 'good enough' for her, the worth of each was eclipsed by Mr. Bingley and Netherfield.

==== Characterisation ====
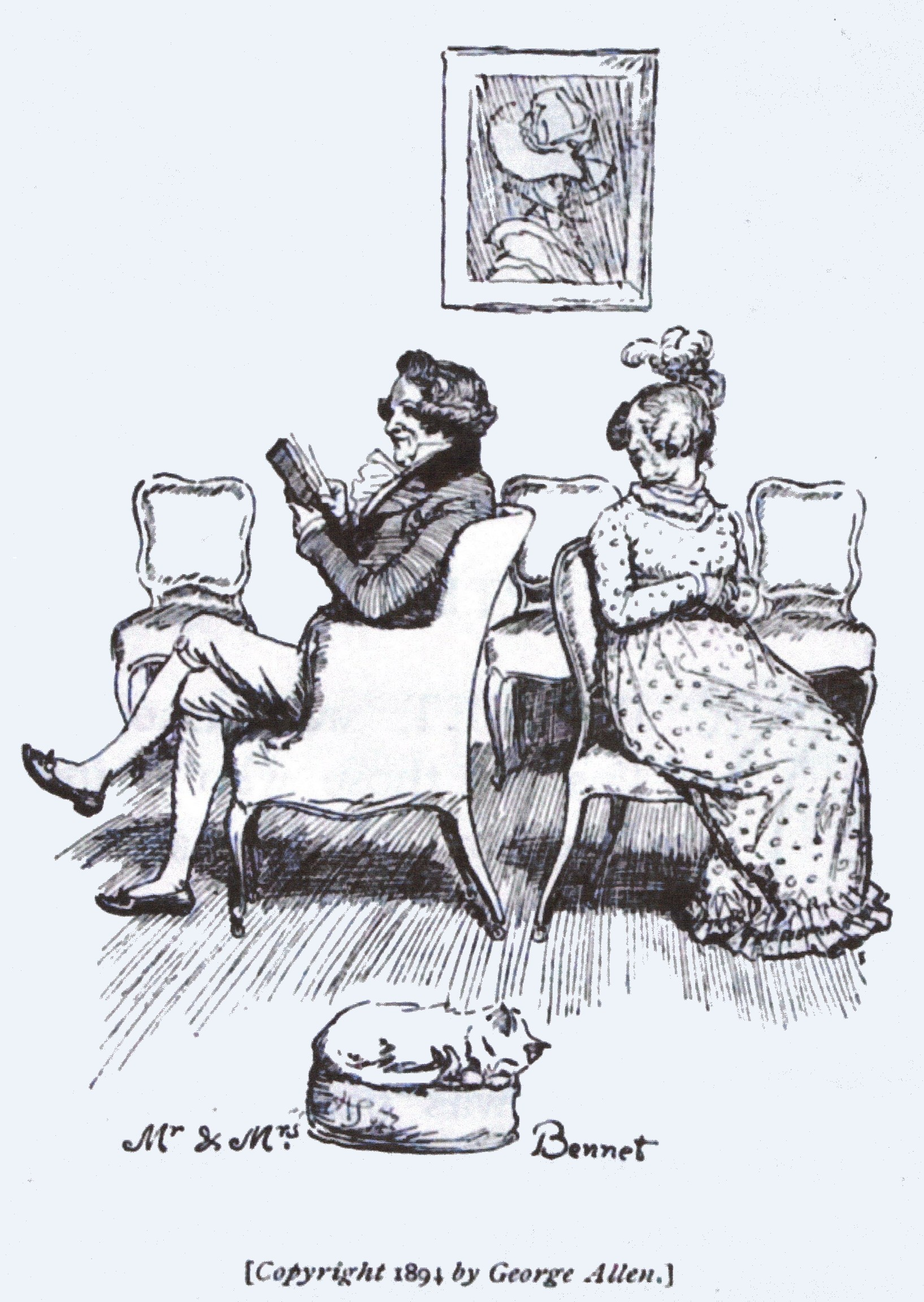
For 20 years, reading allowed Mr Bennet to bear the foolishness of his wife (Hugh Thomson, 1894).

Mrs Bennet's favourite pastimes are shopping and socialising. Of the Gardiner siblings, Mrs Bennet had the best wedding, since she married a member of the local gentry, owner of an estate with an income of £2000 annually. Mrs Bennet does not understand why her husband could do nothing to change the fate of the estate (despite it having been explained to her numerous times (she assumes that he simply won't change it on purpose to stress her "poor nerves")), since it clouded his future and that of his daughters, given that she and her husband were unable to have a boy. They had hoped for years, even after the birth of Lydia, for the son who would have allowed to put an end to the entail, but they only had girls.

Mrs Bennet sends Jane to Mr Bingley's Netherfield estate in the rain to make sure that through illness she must stay there, encourages Mr Collins to ask for the hand of Elizabeth, and rejoices loudly at Lydia's marriage ("No sentiment of shame gave a damp to her triumph" specifies the narrator), remaining indifferent to the dishonourable reasons which made it necessary (that a man had to be bribed to marry her favourite daughter), since it corresponds to the realisation of "her dearest wishes" to have her daughter "well married".

Her notion of stylish behaviour is summarised in what she said of Sir William: "He has always something to say to everybody. – That is my idea of good breeding". She behaves with embarrassing vulgarity and lack of tact, especially at Netherfield, where her pretentiousness, foolishness and "total lack of correction" are evident. For her, it is not the manners or behaviour that indicate belonging to a high rank, it is ostentatiousness and flaunting wealth, and the validity of a marriage is measured by the amount "of calico, muslin and cambric" to buy for the bride's trousseau.

==== An egocentric hypochondriac ====
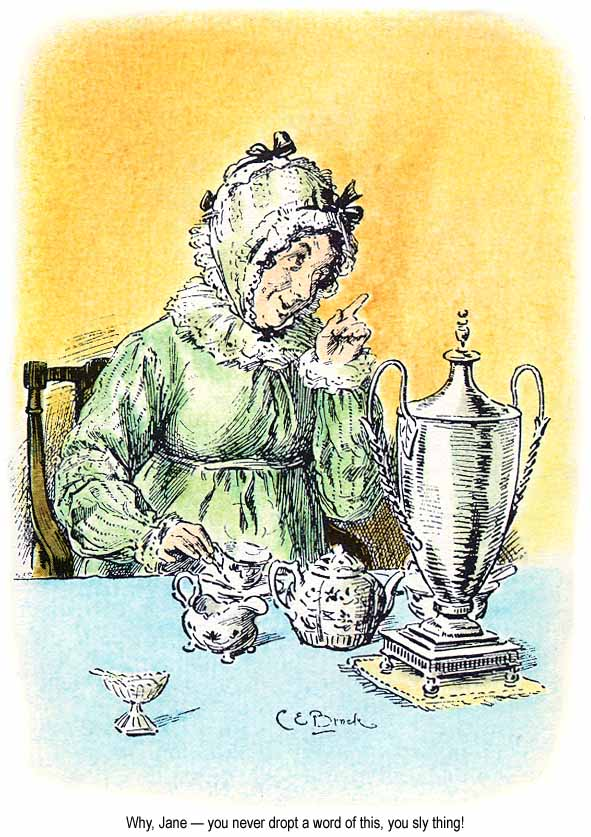
When her husband announces an unknown host for dinner, Mrs Bennet imagines that is Bingley, and that Jane has hidden that fact from her (C. E. Brock, 1895).

Jane Austen has particularly charged the character of Mrs Bennett in negative terms. As Virginia Woolf wrote, "no excuse is found for [her fools] and no mercy shown them [...] Sometimes it seems as if her creatures were born merely to give [her] the supreme delight of slicing their heads off". In the tradition of the comedy of manners and didactic novel, she uses a caricatural and parodic character to mock some of her contemporaries.

Mrs Bennet is distinguished primarily by her propensity to logorrhea, a defect that Thomas Gisborne considers specifically feminine. She does not listen to any advice – especially if it comes from Elizabeth – makes redundant and repetitive speeches, chatters annoyingly, and makes speeches full of absurdities and inconsistencies, which she accompanies, when she is thwarted, with complaints and continual cantankerous remarks that her interlocutors are careful not to interrupt, knowing that it would only serve to prolong them. Even Jane finds her mother's complaints hard to bear, when Mrs Bennet manifests "a longer irritation than usual" about the absence of Mr Bingley, confessing to Elizabeth how much the lack of self-control of her mother revives her suffering ("Oh that my dear mother had more command over herself! she can have no idea of the pain she gives me by her continual reflections on him").

Another emphasised and ridiculed aspect of Mrs Bennet is her "nervous disease", or her tendency to use it to attract sympathy to herself, or else demanding that the family pay attention to her, but ultimately failing to make herself loved. There are characters particularly concerned about their health in all the novels of Jane Austen. These egocentric characters, who use their real or imagined ailments to reduce all to them, seem to be inspired by Mrs Austen, whose complaints about her health had the ability to irritate Jane, who speaks with certain ironic annoyance about it in her letters to her sister. (Note: "her appetite and nights are very good, but she sometimes complains of an asthma, a dropsy, water in her chest, and a liver disorder" (18 December 1798); "For a day or two last week my mother was very poorly with a return of one of her old complaints" (17 January 1809). Even A Memoir of Jane Austen, in 1870, and Jane Austen: Her Life and Letters (by William and Richard Arthur Austen-Leigh), in 1913, present Mrs Austen as a patient much more angelic.)

Some critics point out that it would be unfair to see only her faults. Her obsession is justified by the family's situation: the cynicism of Mr Bennet will not prevent Mr Collins from inheriting Longbourn. In an environment where there are many young ladies to be married and few interesting parties, she is much more attentive to the competition than her husband. She does not neglect her daughters, while he merely treats them mostly as "stupid and ignorant as all the girls".

The narrator does not forgive her stupidity, nor her awkward interferences, and finds her absurd remarks and pretensions inherently selfish. When Jane asks her to feel gratitude to her brother, who had paid a lot of money towards Lydia's wedding, she replied that "had he not had children, that she and her daughters will inherit all his property", and he has never been "really generous so far" ("If he had not had a family of his own, I and my children must have had all his money, you know; and it is the first time we have ever had anything from him, except a few presents"). Lydia's marriage does not satisfy her as much as she wanted, because her daughter did not stay long enough with her so that she could continue to parade with her. ("Lydia does not leave me because she is married, but only because her husband's regiment happens to be so far off. If that had been nearer, she would not have gone so soon"), and if she was able to happily "for all her maternal feelings [get] rid of her most deserving daughters".

==== Guilty negligences ====
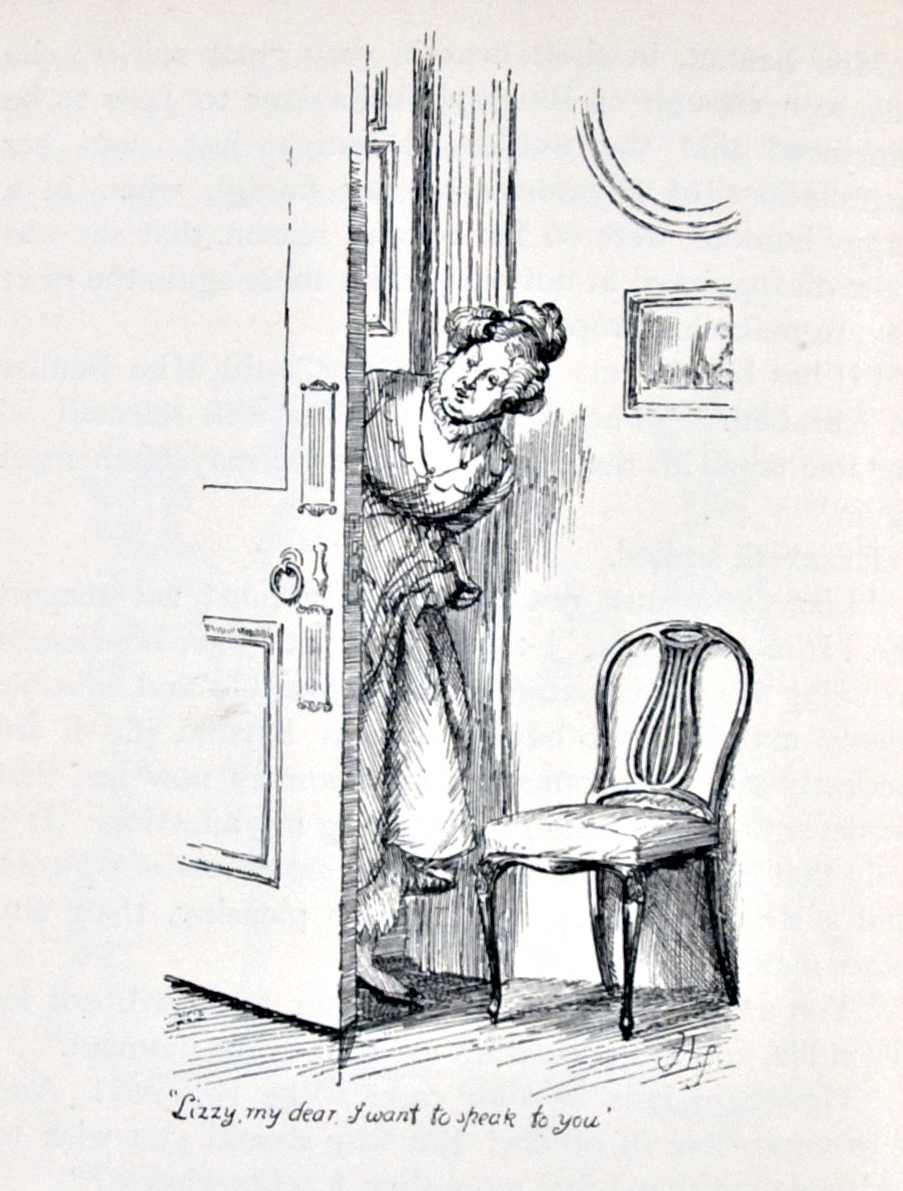
Mrs Bennet looks for ways to let Jane and Bingley be alone together (Hugh Thomson, 1894).

Although Mrs. Bennet would like to see the girls married, she does not raise them to be good housekeepers to a future husband.

Thomas Gisborne theorized in An Enquiry Into the Duties of Men, (Note: Complete title: An Enquiry Into the Duties of Men in the Higher and Middle Classes of Society in Great Britain, Resulting From Their Respective Stations, Professions, and Employments) published in 1794, and in An Enquiry into the Duties of the Female Sex, published in 1797, the idea of areas reserved for men and women. According to him, women are by nature destined to the domestic sphere, defined as the particular area where "their excellence deploys". Therefore, their role is to keep the house. Mrs Bennet openly mocks Charlotte Lucas when she is forced to go into the kitchen in order to supervise the tarts making, proudly saying that her "daughters are brought up differently"; also, she reacts with force when Mr Collins, on the day of his arrival, assumed that his cousins took part in the preparation of dinner.

== The Bennet daughters ==
Jane and Elizabeth are the eldest and are appreciated by their father. Mary displays intellectual and musical pretensions. The two youngest daughters, Catherine (Kitty) and Lydia, are younger girls portrayed with characteristics considered to be immature.

=== Jane Bennet ===
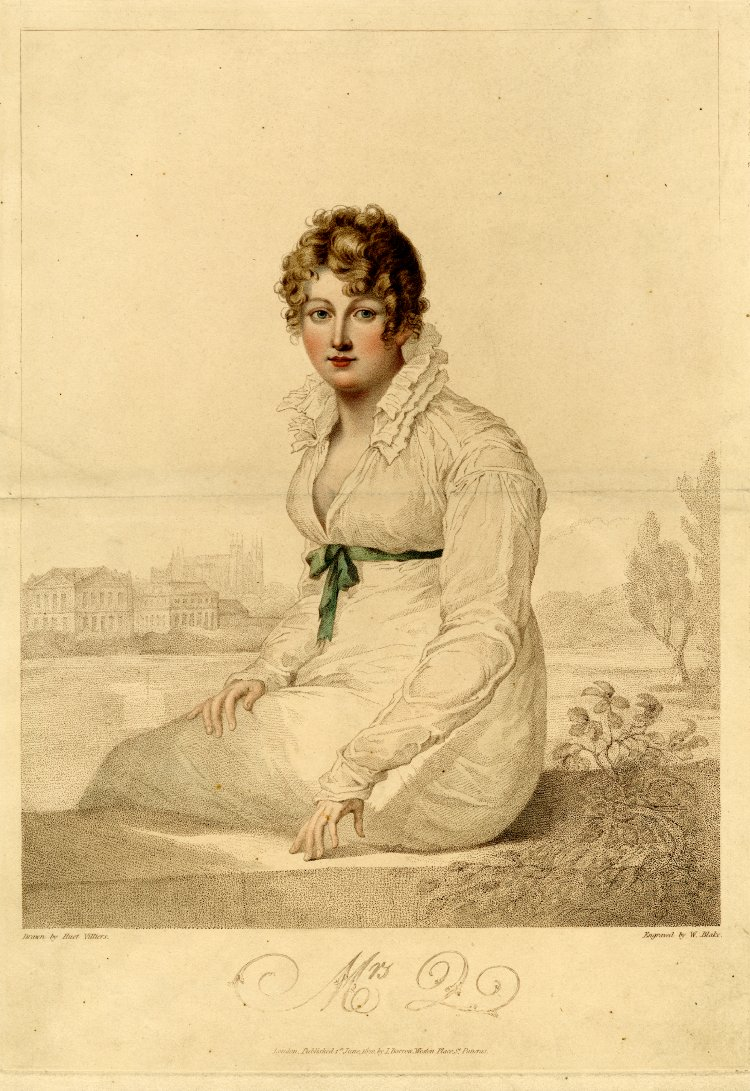
In a letter to Cassandra dated May 1813, Jane Austen describes a picture she saw at a gallery which was a good likeness of "Mrs Bingley" – Jane Bennet. Deirdre Le Faye in Jane Austen: The World of Her Novels suggests that Portrait of Mrs. Q- is the picture that Austen described.

Jane Bingley (née Bennet) is the eldest Bennet sister, being 22 years old at the beginning of the novel and 23 by the end. Similarly to her immediate younger sister, Elizabeth, Jane is favoured by her father due to her steady, genteel disposition. Like each of her sisters, Jane had an allowance/pin money of £40 per annum before her marriage to Charles Bingley. She is considered the most beautiful young lady in the neighbourhood.

Jane's character contrasts with Elizabeth's as being sweeter, shyer, and equally sensible, but not as clever. Her most notable trait is her desire to see only the good in others. As Anna Quindlen wrote, Jane is "sugar to Elizabeth's lemonade". She is favoured by her mother solely because of her external beauty. If Jane has taken anything after her mother, it is a certain inflexibility of thought; she is unwilling to think ill of others (barring strong evidence), whereas her mother will think ill of anyone on little-to-no evidence at all.

Jane falls in love with Mr Bingley, a rich young man who has recently leased Netherfield Park, a neighbouring estate. "'He is just what a young man ought to be,' said [Jane], 'sensible, good humoured, lively; and I never saw such happy manners! – so much ease, with such perfect good breeding.'" Their love is initially thwarted by Bingley's friend, Mr Darcy, and his sister Caroline Bingley, who are each concerned by Jane's low connections. They have plans to connect Mr Bingley with Miss Darcy, Mr Darcy's younger sister. Mr Darcy, aided by Elizabeth, eventually sees the error in his ways and helps bring Jane and Mr Bingley back together.

Although Jane is frequently described as gentle and amiable, she does not always show explicit regard for Mr Bingley. Her sweetness and tendency to see the best in everyone mean that, at times, both Bingley and Mr Darcy fail to perceive the depth of her affection. Charlotte Lucas even advises Elizabeth that Jane should more clearly emphasize her regard for Bingley. It is only Elizabeth, who shares a close and intuitive understanding with her sister, who fully perceives the intensity of Jane's love. This subtlety in expressing emotion underscores Jane's reserved and sincere nature.

As described in volume 3, chapter 19 of the novel, after their marriage, the couple manages to live at Netherfield for a year before life in Meryton (being imposed upon by Mrs Bennet and Mrs Phillips) become too much for their good tempers, leading them to give up the lease on the estate and establish themselves elsewhere. Following this, "Mr. Bingley bought an estate in a neighbouring county to Derbyshire, and Jane and Elizabeth, in addition to every source of happiness, were within thirty-miles of each other."

=== Elizabeth Bennet ===
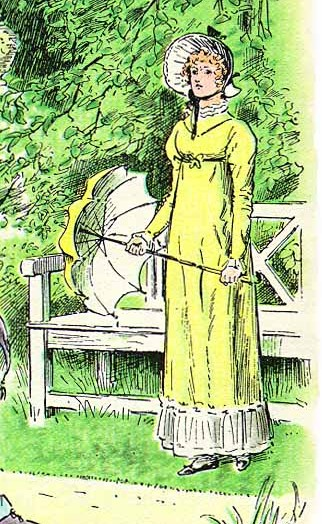
Elizabeth Bennet

Elizabeth Darcy (née Bennet) is the second of the Bennet daughters, being 20 years old at the beginning of the novel and 21 by the end. Like each of her sisters, Elizabeth has an allowance/pin money of £40 per annum. As the plot begins, her closest relationships are with her father (as his favourite daughter), her sister Jane, her Aunt Gardiner, and her best friend Charlotte Lucas. However, she is the least favourite of her mother, Mrs Bennet, because of her resistance to her mother's plans. As the story progresses, so does her relationship with Mr Darcy. The course of Elizabeth and Mr Darcy's relationship is ultimately decided when Darcy overcomes his pride, and Elizabeth overcomes her prejudice, leading them each to acknowledge their love for each other.

=== Mary Bennet ===
Mary Bennet is the middle sister, being around 18 years old at the beginning of the novel and 19 by the end. Like her two younger sisters, Kitty and Lydia, she is seen as "silly" by Mr Bennet, and not pretty like her sisters or "good-humoured" by Mrs Bennet.

Socially inept, Mary mostly reads, plays music and sings, rather than actually joining in most family activities, and is more in the habit of moralising at people than in conversing with them, yet, hypocritically, she is often impatient to display her "accomplishments" and is rather vain about them. She feels that reading books makes her an authority on those subjects. While she has inherited her father's fondness for books, she has also inherited her mother's lack of self-awareness and discernment; only able to pick up on the most superficial meanings of what she reads, as well as a tendency to repeat phrases from her books in place of original conversation. Mary recites awkward interpretations of what are supposed to be profound observations from her books.

When Mr Collins is refused by Elizabeth, Mrs Bennet hopes Mary may be convinced to accept him, and Mary herself hoped that Mr Collins would turn his affections towards her.

Like each of her sisters, Mary had an allowance of £40 per annum.

Mary does not appear often in the novel. However, it is said in volume 3, chapter 19, that with Jane, Elizabeth, and Lydia married and moved out of Longbourn, and Kitty living primarily with Jane and Elizabeth, Mary received more attention, and was made to socialise more with people during company.

According to James Edward Austen-Leigh's A Memoir of Jane Austen, Mary marries "one of her Uncle Philips' clerks, and was content to be considered a star in the society of Meryton".

The Other Bennet Sister is a 2020 novel by Janice Hadlow.After the marriages of Jane and Elizabeth and the death of Mr. Bennet, Mary's future becomes uncertain, forcing her to leave Longbourn and seek a new place in the world. She travels between her sisters’ households and eventually finds her way to the Gardiners, who empower her to accept herself for who and what she is and grow in confidence. She draws the attention of two suitors, Mr. Hayward and Mr. Ryder, but despite pressure from her mother to get married, Mary insists on finding happiness on her own terms.

The novel was adapted into a television series by Bad Wolf and Sony Pictures Television, starring Ella Bruccoleri as Mary Bennet, Richard E. Grant as Mr Bennet and Ruth Jones as Mrs Bennet. It premiered on BBC One on 15 March 2026 with generally positive reviews.

=== Catherine "Kitty" Bennet ===
Catherine Bennet, called "Kitty", is Mr and Mrs Bennet's fourth daughter, being 17 years old at the beginning of the novel and 18 by the end. Kitty is described as "weak-spirited", "irritable", and "ignorant, idle and vain".

Although she is older than Lydia by almost two years, Kitty is almost completely under her younger sister's influence. She does not recognise the consequences of keeping Lydia's plot to elope a secret from her family.

Although Kitty is portrayed as having no different thoughts from Lydia, Lydia takes her for granted, so Kitty holds some resentment towards her, such as when Lydia is invited to Brighton by the newly married Mrs Forster, Kitty is portrayed as being envious of Lydia, declaring that, as the older sister by two years, she had just as much right to be invited as Lydia.

Like each of her sisters, Kitty has an allowance/pin money of £40 per annum.

It is mentioned in volume 2, chapter 37, that whilst her oldest sisters, Jane and Elizabeth, have tried over the years (prior to the events of Pride and Prejudice) to educate Kitty and Lydia in order to stop their wild and ill-bred behaviours, their efforts were seen as 'interfering' by Kitty and Lydia, were undermined by their mother, and were unsupported by their father.

In volume 3, chapter 19, Kitty has improved while spending time with Elizabeth and Jane, and without Lydia's negative influence.

According to A Memoir of Jane Austen, "Kitty Bennet was satisfactorily married to a clergyman near Pemberley", possibly a parish under the patronage of the Darcy family.

=== Lydia Bennet ===
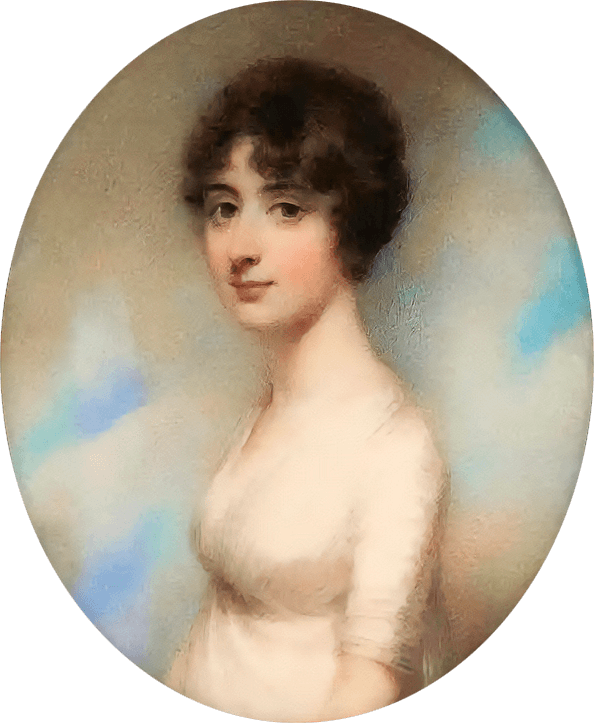
Mary Pearson is thought to have been the model for Lydia. She was briefly engaged to Jane Austen's brother, Henry Thomas Austen.

Lydia Wickham (née Bennet) is the youngest Bennet sister, being 15 years old at the beginning of the novel and 16 years old by the end.

In personality, Lydia is a younger version of her mother, as well as "a favourite with her mother, whose affection had brought her into public at an early age." She is called "silly & ignorant", "vain, ignorant, idle, and absolutely uncontrolled", and "untamed, unabashed, wild, noisy, and fearless", with an exaggerated estimation of her own self-importance, which her mother views as "cheerfulness", "jolliness", and "flirtatiousness". Like her mother, Lydia is incapable of keeping secrets and respecting confidences.

Lydia lives in the moment, thinking only of herself and things that relate to her own enjoyments (clothes, parties, flirting with handsome men in regimental uniforms, being the envy of others), and is wrapped up in herself, and sparing no thought for consequences to herself or others, especially when it gets in the way of her own enjoyment. Her behaviour leads to her running off to London with George Wickham, who has no intention of marrying her:

But [Darcy] found Lydia absolutely resolved on remaining where she was. She cared for none of her friends; she wanted no help of [Darcy's]; she would not hear of leaving Wickham. She was sure they should be married some time or other, and it did not much signify when. Since such were her feelings, it only remained, [Darcy] thought, to secure and expedite a marriage.

She dominates her elder sister Kitty, and has resisted attempts by her elder sisters Jane and Elizabeth to correct her behaviour. She is supported by Mrs Bennet, who indulges all of her "silly", forward and selfish behaviour, and has for years filled Lydia's head with tales of lace, bonnets, and high fashions:

[Lydia] is very young; she has never been taught to think on serious subjects; and for the last half-year, nay, for a twelvemonth, she has been given up to nothing but amusement and vanity. She has been allowed to dispose of her time in the most idle and frivolous manner, and to adopt any opinions that came in her way. Since the ----shire were first quartered in Meryton, nothing but love, flirtation, and officers have been in her head. She has been doing every thing in her power, by thinking and talking on the subject, to give greater – what shall I call it? – susceptibility to her feelings, which are naturally lively enough.

Lydia is careless with her money, always spending more than her pin money allows, receiving more money from her mother, and going to her sisters to borrow money, whom she never pays back. Like each of her sisters, Lydia had an allowance/pin money of £40 per annum before her marriage to Wickham, after which she started receiving £100 per annum (for the rest of her father's life).

Of the three youngest Bennet sisters, Lydia is mentioned the most. In volume 3, chapter 19, Lydia, now married, is not living the "high life", but did not seem to notice: "It had always been evident to [Elizabeth] that such an income as theirs ... must be insufficient to their support; and whenever they changed their quarters, either Jane or [Elizabeth], were sure to be applied to, for some little assistance towards discharging their bills. Their manner of living ... was unsettled in the extreme. They were always moving from place to place in quest of a cheap situation, and always spending more than they ought. [Wickham]'s affection for [Lydia] soon sunk into indifference: [Lydia's] lasted a little longer; and in spite of her youth and her manners, she retained all the claims to reputation which her marriage had given her."
