= Cyril Nri =

English actor (born 1961)

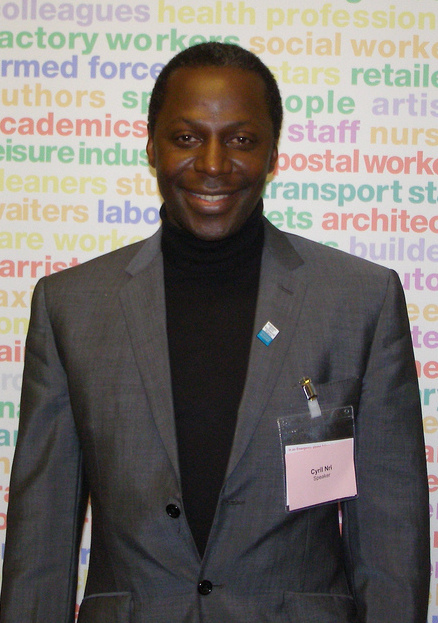
- Cyril Nri in 2004
- Born: Cyril Ikechukwu Nri; 25 April 1961 (age 65); Nigeria
- Education: Bristol Old Vic Theatre School
- Occupation: Actor

Cyril Ikechukwu Nri // (born 25 April 1961) is a Nigerian-born English actor best known for playing Superintendent Adam Okaro in the police TV series The Bill. Cyril Nri plays the role of Lord Herman Danbury in the Netflix series Queen Charlotte: A Bridgerton Story (2023).

== Early life ==
Nri was born on 25 April 1961 in Nigeria. Nri's paternal side of the family is Igbo, while his mother was originally from Barbados; they fled the country in 1968 before the Nigerian Civil War ended. He moved to Portugal when he was seven, and later to London.

Nri attended Holland Park School in West London and appeared in a school production of Three Penny Opera. He attended the Young Vic Youth Theatre in Waterloo, London. He trained at the Bristol Old Vic Theatre School, graduating in 1984. Nri has lived in South London since the 1980s.

== Career ==
Nri is best known for playing Superintendent Adam Okaro, later Borough Commander, for four years in the long-running ITV police drama The Bill. His character became the highest ranking black character in the show.

After drama school at the Bristol Old Vic, Nri started acting life at The Royal Shakespeare Company, where his first role was Lucius in Ron Daniels' 1982 production of Julius Caesar. He played Ariel to Max Von Sydow's Prospero in Jonathan Miller's 1988 production of The Tempest. He played Graham in the BBC's legal drama This Life (1996–1997).

In 2009, he appeared in The Observer at the Royal National Theatre.

In 2009 and 2010, he appeared in Law & Order UK as Judge Demarco and again reprised this role in the 2012 and 2013 series of the show.

In 2012–13, he played Cassius in Greg Doran's Royal Shakespeare Company production of Julius Caesar in Stratford upon Avon, London and New York, where in his New York Times review Ben Brantley said of Nri, "Mr. Nri's expression as he registers Caesar's words is that of a man who feels a noose tightening around his neck. Wary and sly, scared and manipulative, Mr. Nri is an excellent Cassius, capturing the climate of paranoia and politicking that thickens the air."

In 2016, he earned a British Academy Television Award nomination for his performance as Lance in the Russell T. Davies TV series Cucumber. He also appeared in an episode of Goodnight Sweetheart playing a doctor at the hospital where Yvonne Sparrow loses her unborn child (series 4).

In 2016, he played Polonius in Simon Godwin's production of Hamlet for the Royal Shakespeare Company.

In 2017, Nri appeared on stage at the Dorfman Theatre, London, in Barber Shop Chronicles by Inua Ellams.

In 2020, he played a barrister in the BBC drama Noughts and Crosses.

In 2021, he played Sheldon in the Royal National Theatre's production of Trouble in Mind by Alice Childress.

Nri played Bill in the Young Vic's 2023 revival of Zinnie Harris' Further than the Furthest Thing.

== Personal life ==
Nri has been married and is gay.

== Filmography ==
=== Film ===
Year	Title	Role	Notes
1989	Strapless	Harold Sabola	
1990	A Strike Out of Time	Charlie White	Television film
1995	The Steal	Council Computer Operator	
1997	Hidden Empire: Behind the Mask	Kano	Short film
1998	Tale of the Mummy	Forensics	
1998	Only Love	Eric Blair	Television film
1998	Besieged	Priest	
1999	Wing Commander	Security Officer	
2002	Long Time Dead	Dr. Wilson	
2007	Deadmeat	Prime Minister	
2008	Survivor	Boss	Short film
2008	Bad Day	Restaurant Manager	
2008	The Cornwell Estate		Short film
2010	Critical Eye	CCTV Controller	Short film
2012	Father's Day	Ade	Television film
2012	Julius Caesar	Cassius	Television film
2018	Jellyfish	Adam Hale	
2018	Rasta Man Vibrations	Dr. Urquhart	Short film
2019	Backdraft 2	OFI Investigator Rickets	
2019	Star Wars: The Rise of Skywalker	First Order Officer	
2020	The Witches	Chief Doorman	
2022	Boys on Film 22: Love to Love You	Edna May	
2023	Wicked Little Letters	Judge Maccleston	
2023	Just Passing	Sami	Short film

=== Television ===
Year	Title	Role	Notes
1989	Saracen	Desmond	Episode: "Three Blind Mice"
1989	4 Play	Tony Sewell	Episode: "The Book Liberator"
1990	The Bill	Julian Bates	Episode: "A Case to Answer"
1992	Runaway Bay	Paul	Episode: "History Revisited"
1993	Frank Stubbs Promotes	Brian	Episode: "Wheels"
1994	Calling the Shots	Paul	Miniseries; 2 episodes
1995	Casualty	Steve York	Episode: "Compensation"
1996	Pie in the Sky	Stuart Crowe	Episode: "New Leaf"
2000	Family Affairs	William McHugh	Recurring role
1996–1997	This Life	Graham	Series regular; 22 episodes
1997	Goodnight Sweetheart	Dr. Obote	Episode: "How Long Has This Been Going On?"
1998	The Bill	Chris Lycett	Episode: "One of the Gang"
1999	A Touch of Frost	Warren Barber	Episode: "One Man's Meat"
1999	Maisie Raine	Paul	Episode: "Old Scores"
2000	Holby City	Ben Sincalir	Episode: "Against All Odds"
2000	The Bill	Pascal Illunga	Episode: "Beyond Conviction"
2000	Arabian Nights	Schaca	Miniseries; 2 episodes
2001	Doctors	Andrew Lombard	Episode: "Too Posh to Push"
2001	Down to Earth	Henry Jones	Episode: "Great Expectations"
2001–2002	EastEnders	D.C. Burton	Recurring role; 11 episodes
2002–2006	The Bill	Superintendent Adam Okaro	Series regular
2003	Murder Investigation Team	Superintendent Adam Okaro	Episode: "Moving Targets"
2007	Holby City	Lawrence Marshall	Episode: "Blood Ties"
2007	Cold Blood	Colonel Harrington Smith	Episode: "Dead and Buried"
2008	Waking the Dead	Raymond Ayanike	Episode: "Skin"
2009–2014	Law & Order: UK	Judge De Marco	Recurring role; 4 episodes
2010	Doctors	Mark Harmer	Episode: "Too Little, Too Late"
2010	The Sarah Jane Adventures	The Shopkeeper	Episode: "Lost in Time"
2011	House of Anubis	Mr. Lewis	Recurring role; 3 episodes
2011	Tinga Tinga Tales	Peacock	Recurring role; 2 episodes
2011	Holby City	Pastor Carl	Episode: "In Between Days"
2011	New Tricks	Billy Green	Episode: "Setting Out Your Shell"
2013	Wizards vs Aliens	Nathaniel Nightjar	Episode: "100 Wizards"
2014	Doctors	Thomas Hakizimana	Episode: "A Blind Eye"
2015	Crims	Mr. Gardner	Episode: "Day Fifty-Seven"
2015	Cucumber	Lance Sullivan	Miniseries; 6 episodes
2015	Critical	Joseph Whitnell	Episode: "The Weakness of Mankind"
2016	Class	Chair	Episode: "The Lost"
2017	Death in Paradise	Mayor Joseph Richards	Episode: "Erupting in Murder"
2017	Bucket	Mr. Merdon	Recurring role; 2 episodes
2017	Doctors	Inspector Tony Callaghan	Episode: "Running with the Pack"
2017	Midsomer Murders	Warwick Sowande	Episode: "The Curse of the Ninth"
2018	On the Edge	Patrick	Episode: "A Mother's Love"
2018	Zapped	Quincy Peacock	Episode: "Chef"
2018	The ABC Murders	Father Anselm	Miniseries; 1 episode
2020	Devils	Greg	Recurring role; 3 episodes
2022	Holier Than Thou	Seun	Episode: "Pilot"
2023	The Power	Eniola Ojo	Episode: "A New Organ"
2024	Daddy Issues	Stuart	Episode: "Normal Men"
