= Lucy Briers =

British actress

- Born: Lucy Jane Briers; 19 August 1967 (age 59); Hammersmith, London, England
- Education: Lancaster University
- Years active: 1992–present
- Spouse: Simon Cox (m. 1995, divorced)
- Parents: Richard Briers (father); Ann Davies (mother)

Lucy Jane Briers (born 19 August 1967) is an English actress. Her film, stage and television roles have included appearances in Pride and Prejudice (1995) and sitcom Game On.

== Early life and education ==
Lucy Jane Briers was born in Hammersmith, London. She is the daughter of the actor Richard Briers and actress Ann Davies.

Briers attended St Paul's Girls' School, London (1978–85); Lancaster University (where she studied theatre and sculpture); and then a three-year acting course at the Bristol Old Vic Theatre School. She was also a member of the National Youth Theatre. As well as acting, Briers plays both the piano and flute.

== Career ==
Briers played Mary Bennet in the BBC's television adaptation of Pride & Prejudice (1995). She has narrated the documentary The Riddle of Pompeii, the 2001 series Nurses and Ladette to Lady.

In 2007, Briers appeared in Some Kind of Bliss, a one-woman play by Samuel Adamson at the Trafalgar Studios, a role she reprised in the 2008 Brits off Broadway season. She appeared in the BBC drama Einstein and Eddington (2008) and a West End production of Chekhov's Ivanov. In 2011, she appeared in BBC Four's Twenty Twelve first as Anna Mitchell, one of the three candidates for the post of curator of the Cultural Olympiad, then with her face blurred as Laura, Ian Fletcher's wife. In 2017, she appeared in the Father Brown episode "The Tree of Truth" as Prudence Bovary.

As of March 2026, Briers has played Mrs Hill in the BBC historical drama The Other Bennet Sister. Based on Jane Austen's characters from the novel Pride & Prejudice, the story follows proceedings from Mary Bennet's viewpoint, Mary also being the character Briers played in the 1995 BBC adaptation of Pride & Prejudice.

== Awards and nominations ==
| Year | Award | Category | Work | Result | Ref. |
|---|---|---|---|---|---|
| 2004 | TMA Awards | Best Supporting Actress | Cloud Nine | Nominated | |
| 2008 | WhatsOnStage Awards | Best Solo Performer | Ship of Fools | Nominated | |
| 2019 | Clarence Derwent Awards | Best Female in a Supporting Role | Rosmersholm | Won | |

== Filmography ==
=== Film ===
| Year | Film | Role | Notes |
|---|---|---|---|
| 1992 | A Masculine Ending | Student | TV film |
| 1993 | Unnatural Causes | Liz Marley | TV film |
| 2002 | Prince William | Tiggy Legge-Bourke | TV film |
| 2003 | Perks | Sarah Tidewell | Short |
| 2006 | Long Hot Summer | Rachel | |
| 2008 | Einstein and Eddington | Librarian | TV film |
| 2011 | The Night Watch | Binkie | TV film |
| 2013 | Our Girl | Major O'Brien | Episode: "Pilot" (TV film) |
| 2013 | Alan Partridge: Alpha Papa | Tonia Scott | |
| 2016 | Genius | Miss Wyckoff | |
| 2018 | Oil | Mum | Short |
| 2020 | Emma | Mrs Reynolds | |
| 2020 | The Show | Inspector Barlow | |
| 2021 | Zack Snyder's Justice League | Dog Day Care Owner | |
| 2022 | My Policeman | Miss Brown | |
| 2024 | We Live in Time | Dr. Kerri Weaver | |
| 2025 | Downton Abbey: The Grand Finale | Mrs. Vanneck | |
| 2026 | Flavia | Miss Mountjoy | |

=== Television ===
| Year | Title | Role | Notes |
|---|---|---|---|
| 1992 | Red Dwarf | Harrison | Episode: "Holoship" |
| 1992 | Screaming | Jennifer | |
| 1992 | Spatz | Hayley | Episode: "The Curse of Karen" |
| 1992 | Boon | Maggie | Episode: "MacGuffin's Transputer" |
| 1992 | The Blackheath Poisonings | Maid | 2 episodes |
| 1993 | The Brittas Empire | Wendy | Episode: "Two Little Boys" |
| 1994 | The 10%ers | Sarah | Episode: "Feud" |
| 1995 | Pride and Prejudice | Mary Bennet | Series regular |
| 1996 | Casualty | Joanna Porter | Episode: "Still Waters" |
| 1998 | Game On | Lulu | Episode: "Crabs" |
| 1998 | Unfinished Business | Policewoman | 1 episode |
| 1998 | Imogen's Face | Janet | Mini-series |
| 1998 | Dangerfield | Adele Griffiths | Episode: "The Lost Boy" |
| 1998 | The Bill | Clarinda Beecham | Episode: "Love's Labour Lost" |
| 1999 | Wives and Daughters | Lady Alice | 1 episode |
| 2000 | Beast | Briony's Friends | Episode: "Frightening Shorts" |
| 2001 | The Bill | Helen Thompkins | Episodes: "Long Shadows: Part 1" |
| 2001 | Nurses | Narrator | Voice role |
| 2002 | Helen West | Clerk 1 | Episode: "Shadow Play" |
| 2004 | Agatha Christie's Poirot | Beryl Collins | Episode: "The Hollow" |
| 2004 | Bodies | Nicola Quinn | 1 episode |
| 2005 | Broken News | Sam Henman | 2 episodes |
| 2006 | Great News | Marion | |
| 2007 | Doctors | Emma Fleet | Episode: "Flying Solo" |
| 2007 | Tchaikovsky | Nadezdha von Meck | Mini-series |
| 2007 | Bonkers | Polly Cope | 1 episode |
| 2007 | Silent Witness | Patricia Darlow | Episode: "Apocalypse" |
| 2007 | Genie in the House | Miss Spinelli | Episode: "Genie Swap" |
| 2007 | The Green Green Grass | Doctor | Episode: "The Final Curtain" |
| 2008 | Ashes to Ashes | Patty | 1 episode |
| 2010 | Doctors | Rosie Clifton | Episode: "Something Evil" |
| 2011 | The Night Watch | Binkie | |
| 2011 | Midsomer Murders | Jessica Wingate | Episode: "Death in the Slow Lane" |
| 2011 | Twenty Twelve | Anna Mitchell | Episode: "Cultural Curator" |
| 2011 | Twenty Twelve | Laura Fletcher | Episode: "Equestrian Controversy" |
| 2012 | Parade's End | Mrs. Ferguson | 2 episodes |
| 2012 | The Thick of It | Cathy Hastings | 1 episode |
| 2012 | DCI Banks | Dr. Janet Lucas | Episode: "Strange Affair" |
| 2012 | Dark Matters: Twisted But True | Orphanage Matron | Episode: "Pavlov's Children, Alien Rain, Glow Girls" |
| 2012 | Dark Matters: Twisted But True | Mary Mallon | Episode: "Magical Jet Propulsion, Missing Link Mystery, Typhoid Mary" |
| 2013–15 | Count Arthur Strong | Sheila | Series regular; 6 episodes |
| 2017 | Father Brown | Prudence Bovary | Episode: "The Tree of Truth" |
| 2018 | Casualty | Gill Ransom | 1 episode |
| 2018 | Press | Linda Parks | Episode: "Pure" |
| 2018 | Mrs Wilson | Record Office Lady | 1 episode |
| 2019 | Victoria | Mrs. Arbuthnot | Episode: "Foreign Bodies" |
| 2019 | Four Weddings and a Funeral | Jody | 2 episodes |
| 2019–22 | Gentleman Jack | Mrs Stansfield Rawson | Recurring role; 4 episodes |
| 2020 | Endeavour | Mrs. Blish | Episode: "Oracle" |
| 2020 | Home | Margaret | 1 episode |
| 2020 | Strike | DCI Judy McMurran | Episode: "Lethal White" |
| 2022 | House of the Dragon | Ceira Lannister | Episodes: "Second of His Name" and "We Light the Way" |
| 2023 | Lockwood & Co. | Mrs. Harris | Episode: "Death Is Coming" |
| 2026 | The Other Bennet Sister | Mrs Hill | 3 episodes |

=== Video games ===
| Year | Title | Role | Notes |
|---|---|---|---|
| 2017 | Mass Effect: Andromeda | Various | Voice role |
| 2020 | Assassin's Creed Valhalla | Aethelswith | Voice role |

== Theatre credits ==
| Year | Title | Role | Venue | Notes |
|---|---|---|---|---|
| 1992 | Fooling About | Miranda/Princess | Oxford Playhouse, Oxford | with Oxford Stage Company |
| 1993 | Syme | | Birmingham Repertory Theatre, Birmingham | |
| 1993 | The Tempest | Miranda | Salisbury Playhouse, Salisbury | |
| 1993 | The Venetian Twins | Rosaura | Oxford Playhouse, Oxford | with Oxford Stage Company |
| 1996 | The Entertainer | Jean Rice | Birmingham Repertory Theatre, Birmingham | |
| 1997 | Henry IV, Part 1 & Part 2 | Lady Percy/Doll Tearsheet | The Old Vic, The Cut, London | with English Touring Theatre |
| 1998 | Emma | Jane Fairfax | Calder's Gilded Balloon Theatre, Edinburgh | part of Edinburgh Festival Fringe |
| 1998 | Othello | Desdemona | New Vic Theatre, Newcastle-under-Lyme | |
| 1999 | All That Trouble We Had | Margo | Birmingham Repertory Theatre, Birmingham | |
| 2000 | As You Like It | Phebe | Crucible Theatre, Sheffield & Lyric Theatre, London | |
| 2000 | The Winter's Tale | Paulina | Southwark Playhouse, London | |
| 2000 | Keepers | Maggie | Hampstead Theatre, London | |
| 2001 | Spike | Verity King | Nuffield Theatre, Southampton | |
| 2001 | Don Juan | Charlotte | Crucible Theatre, Sheffield | |
| 2002 | Teeth 'n' Smiles | Laura | Crucible Theatre, Sheffield | |
| 2003 | Electra | Electra | Gate Theatre, London | |
| 2004 | Cloud Nine | Edward/Betty | Crucible Theatre, Sheffield | |
| 2004 | The Solid Gold Cadillac | Miss Amelia Shotgraven | Garrick Theatre, London | |
| 2005 | Rose Bernd | Frau Grolisch | Arcola Theatre, London | |
| 2005 | Musik | Else | Arcola Theatre, London | |
| 2005 | The Shadow Box | Beverley | Southwark Playhouse, London | |
| 2006 | The Voysey Inheritance | Honor Voysey | Royal National Theatre, London | |
| 2006 | Catch | Andrea/Carol | Royal Court Theatre, London | |
| 2007 | Ship of Fools | Rachel/Monsieur Schultze/Holly Trinity/Margery Clermont | Theatre503, London | |
| 2007 | Some Kind of Bliss | Rachel | Trafalgar Studios, London | One-woman show |
| 2008 | Sexual Perversity in Chicago | Joan Webber | Theatre Royal, Norwich | |
| 2008 | Ivanov | Martha Babakina | Donmar at the Wyndham's Theatre, London | |
| 2009 | Just Between Ourselves | Pam | Royal Theatre, Northampton | |
| 2009 | Private Fears in Public Places | Charlotte | Royal Theatre, Northampton | |
| 2009 | Miss Julie | Christine | Rose Theatre, Kingston upon Thames | |
| 2009 | Bedroom Farce | Jan | Rose Theatre, Kingston upon Thames | |
| 2010 | Behud (Beyond Belief) | Joanne Stevenson | Soho Theatre, London | |
| 2011 | Top Girls | Pope Joan/Louise | Chichester Festival Theatre, Chichester | |
| 2014 | Bring Up the Bodies | Jane Rochford | Aldwych Theatre, London & Winter Garden Theatre, New York City | with Royal Shakespeare Company |
| 2014 | Wolf Hall | Katherine of Aragon | Aldwych Theatre, London & Winter Garden Theatre, New York City | with Royal Shakespeare Company |
| 2015 | Ivanov | Zinaida | Chichester Festival Theatre, Chichester | |
| 2015 | The Seagull | Polina Andryevna | Chichester Festival Theatre, Chichester | |
| 2016 | Show Boat | Parthenia Ann | Crucible Theatre, Sheffield & New London Theatre, London | |
| 2017 | Forty Years On | Miss Nisbitt | Chichester Festival Theatre, Chichester | |
| 2019 | Wild East | Dr. Pitt | Young Vic, London | |
| 2019 | Rosmersholm | Mrs. Helseth | Duke of York's Theatre, London | |
| 2020 | All of Us | Rita/Doctor Anderson/Angela | Royal National Theatre, London | |
| 2022 | Orlando | Virginia/Elizabeth I | Garrick Theatre, London | |
| 2025 | Backstroke | Carol | Donmar Warehouse, London | |
| 2026 | The Market Deeping Model Railway Club | Linda | Nottingham Playhouse, Nottingham | |
