= Ann Davies (actress) =

English actress (1934–2022)

- Davies in Doctor Who: The Dalek Invasion of Earth (1964)
- Born: Ann Cuerton Davies; 25 November 1934; Hornchurch, Essex, England
- Died: 26 April 2022 (aged 87); London, England
- Occupation: Actress
- Spouse: Richard Briers (m. 1956; died 2013)
- Children: 2, including Lucy Briers

Ann Cuerton Briers (25 November 1934 – 26 April 2022), better known by her stage name Ann Davies, was an English actress. Davies was the wife of actor Richard Briers until his death in February 2013, and the mother of actress Lucy Briers and Kate Briers. She acted with her husband in the films Peter's Friends (1992), In the Bleak Midwinter (1995) and Run for Your Wife (2012).

One of her earliest television appearances was as the character Jenny in the BBC series Doctor Who in the story entitled The Dalek Invasion of Earth. In 2003, Davies appeared in an episode of the series Doctors as the character Annette Ludlow.

Davies also appeared alongside her husband in the radio adaptation of the TV series Brothers in Law as well as in two episodes of the sitcom Ever Decreasing Circles.

Davies died aged 87, on 26 April 2022.
