= Sinead Matthews =

British actress

- Born: 1980 (age 45-46); Coventry, West Midlands, England
- Occupation: Actress

Sinead Matthews (born 1980) is an English actress whose credits include film, television, radio and stage. As well as having extensive theatre experience, her screen credits include He Knew He Was Right (2004), Vera Drake (2004), Pride & Prejudice (2005), Ideal (2005–2010), Terry Pratchett's Hogfather (2006), Nanny McPhee and the Big Bang (2010), Black Mirror (2013), The Smoke (2014), Jellyfish (2018), The Crown (2019), and Hullraisers (2022).

== Early life and education ==
Sinead Matthews was born in 1980 in Coventry, England.

She attended Cardinal Wiseman Catholic School in Coventry, then studied A-level drama at Stratford-upon-Avon College for two years between 1996 and 1998. She went on to study acting at Royal Academy of Dramatic Art (RADA) in London alongside acclaimed method actor Pieter Lawman, graduating in 2003 with a BA in Acting (H Level).

== Career ==
Whilst still at RADA, she secured her first professional acting role in the film Vera Drake in 2004. Matthews made her television debut in the 2004 costume drama He Knew He Was Right. In 2005, she starred as Betsey in the period drama Pride & Prejudice, alongside Keira Knightley. In 2009, she starred in Our Class, a new play by Tadeusz Slobodzianek at the NT and in Penelope Skinner's 2010 play Eigengrau at the Bush Theatre.

In 2013, she played a lead role in series one of Black Mirror, as Sarah in the episode "Be Right Back", with Domhnall Gleeson and Hayley Atwell. In August 2016, Matthews played Hermia/Fairy/Mistress Quince in A Midsummer Night's Dream, composed by Felix Mendelssohn, at The Proms. In 2019 she played Marcia Williams, political secretary to Prime Minister Harold Wilson, in season three of the TV series about the royal family, The Crown. From 2022 to 2023, she played a main role as Paula in the Channel 4 british sitcom Hullraisers.

== Filmography ==
=== Film ===
Key
†	Denotes productions that have not yet been released

Year	Title	Role	Notes
2004	Vera Drake	Very Young Woman	
2005	Pride & Prejudice	Betsy	
2006	Terry Pratchett's Hogfather	Violet	TV film
2007	Wednesday	Lilya	Short film
2007	Spring 1941	Tania	
2007	Half Broken Things	Steph	TV film
2007	Who Gets the Dog?	Claire Evans	TV film
2008	Happy-Go-Lucky	Alice	
2008	In Love with Barbara	Young Barbara	TV film
2008	Trimming the Fat	Receptionist	Short film
2009	The Boat That Rocked	Miss Clitt	
2010	Nanny McPhee and the Big Bang	Miss Topsey	
2011	Wreckers	Sharon	
2013	Bed Trick	Rachel	Short film
2014	Mr. Turner	Queen Victoria	
2015	The Process	Leni	
2015	Across the Sea	Mother	Short film
2016	The Roof	Brooks' Assistant	Short film
2016	Mother	Shoe Shop Assistant	Short film
2016	Kaleidoscope	Abby	
2016	Fantastic Beasts and Where to Find Them	Mildred	Deleted scenes only
2017	Daphne	Billie	
2017	National Theatre Live: Hedda Gabler	Mrs. Elvsted	
2017	Wraps	Emma	Short film
2018	Jellyfish	Karen Taylor	
2018	Happy New Year, Colin Burstead	Lainey	
2019	The Wrong Car	Ella	Short film
2019	A Serial Killer's Guide to Life	Izzy	
2019	Muscle	Sandra	
2019	Us Among the Stones	Anna	
2021	I'm Not in Love	Lena	
2021	Radio Silence	Cassie	Short film
2021	Iris	Julia	Short film
TBC	Nairn †	Kay	Post-production

=== Television ===
Year	Title	Role	Notes
2004	The Afternoon Play	Chantelle Hughes	Episode: "Viva Las Blackpool"
2004	He Knew He Was Right	Mary	Mini-series
2005-2010	Ideal	Jenny	Series regular
2007	Trial & Retribution	Rachel Burns	Episode: "Curriculum Vitae"
2013	Black Mirror	Sarah	Episode: "Be Right Back"
2013	Way to Go	Debbie	Series regular
2014	The Smoke	Julia	Mini-series
2015	Inside No. 9	Sarah Nutter	Episode: "The Trial of Elizabeth Gadge"
2015	Toast of London	Varrity Map	Episode: "Man of Sex"
2017	Chewing Gum	Emma	Recurring role, 4 episodes
2017	In the Dark	Paula Days	Mini-series
2018	Hang Ups	Alice Ross	Episode: "Series 1, Episode 6"
2019	The Crown	Marcia Williams	Recurring role, 3 episodes
2020	Sick of It	Jules	Episode: "The Biscuit"
2021	Midsomer Murders	Mel Wallace	Episode: "The Wolf Hunter of Little Worthy"
2022	Hullraisers	Paula	Main character
2023	Murder is Easy	Miss Waynflete	Two-part drama
2024	Things You Should Have Done	Michelle	Recurring role, 3 episodes

=== Radio ===
- I Love Stephen Fry (2010) – Chloe
- Diary of a Nobody (2012) – Sarah
- All Those Women (2015) – Jen

=== Stage ===
Year	Title	Role	Venue	Notes
2004	The Crucible	Abigail Williams	Crucible Theatre, Sheffield	
2004–2005	The Mandate	Anastasia	Cottesloe Theatre, London	
2005	The Birthday Party	Lulu	Duchess Theatre, London	
2005	The Wild Duck	Hedvig	Donmar Warehouse, London	
2005–2006	You Never Can Tell	Dolly Clandon	Theatre Royal, Bath & Garrick Theatre, London	also, UK tour
2007	Women of Troy	Cassandra	Lyttelton Theatre, London	
2008	His Ghostly Heart	Daisy	Bush Theatre, London	part of "The Broken Space Season"
2008	Little Dolls	Vicky	Bush Theatre, London	part of "The Broken Space Season"
2009	Our Class	Dora	Cottesloe Theatre, London	
2010	Eigengrau	Rose	Bush Theatre, London	
2010	Lulu	Lulu	Gate Theatre, London	with Headlong Theatre
2010	The Glass Menagerie	Laura Wingfield	Young Vic, London	
2011	Ecstasy	Dawn	Hampstead Theatre, London	
2012	The Master and Margarita	Margarita	Barbican Centre, London	also Tour
2012	The Way of the World	Millamant	Crucible Theatre, Sheffield	
2012	The Changeling	Beatrice-Joanna	Young Vic, London	
2013	A Time to Reap	Marysia	Royal Court Theatre, London	
2013	Trout Stanley	Sugar	Southwark Playhouse, London	
2014	Blurred Lines		The Shed, London	
2014	Pests	Pink	Royal Exchange, Manchester & Royal Court Theatre, London	also, UK tour
2015	The Wasp	Heather	Hampstead Theatre, London	
2015	The Hudsucker Proxy	Amy Archer	Nuffield Theatre, Southampton & Everyman Playhouse	
2015	Evening at the Talk House	Jane	Dorfman Theatre, London	
2016	Giving	Laura	Hampstead Theatre, London	
2016	A Midsummer Night's Dream	Hermia	Royal Albert Hall, London	with BBC Scottish Symphony Orchestra
2016	Hedda Gabler	Mrs. Elvsted	Lyttelton Theatre, London	
2017	Loot	Fay	Park Theatre, London & Watermill Theatre, Bagnor	
2018	Absolute Hell	Elizabeth Collier	Lyttelton Theatre, London	
2019	The Starry Messenger	Doris	Wyndham's Theatre, London	
2019	The Antipodes	Eleanor	Dorfman Theatre, London	
2022	Mad House	Pam	Ambassadors Theatre	
2024	Till the Stars Come Down	Sylvia	Dorfman Theatre, London	
