= The Body in the Mobile Library and Other Stories =

2024 book by Peter Bradshaw

- Author: Peter Bradshaw
- Cover artist: Nell Wood
- Language: English
- Publisher: Lightning Books
- Publication date: April 11, 2024
- Publication place: United Kingdom
- Media type: Print (paperback)
- Pages: 224
- ISBN: 1785633902
- OCLC: 218657
- Preceded by: Night Of Triumph

The Body in the Mobile Library and Other Stories is a 2024 collection of short stories by author and critic Peter Bradshaw.

== Writing ==
The Body in the Mobile Library and Other Stories is a collection of twenty-one darkly humorous and macabre stories, often with a poignant, or absurdist, or nightmarish theme. Many of the stories were previously broadcast on BBC Radio 4 or published in Esquire.

== Reception ==
Tommy Gilhooly in the Literary Review said the collection is "mischievous, often raunchy and always teetering on perversity".

Emma Beddington in The Spectator called one story "compellingly gruesome" and wrote: "Bradshaw relishes the grotesque and improbable; his set-ups are outrageously inventive" but that "characters are sympathetically drawn and their longings, insecurities, vanities and weaknesses feel all too credible."
