= Kaleidoscope (2016 film) =

- Directed by: Rupert Jones
- Starring: Toby Jones; Anne Reid
- Release dates: 21 October 2016 (CIFF); 10 November 2017
- Running time: 100 minutes
- Country: United Kingdom
- Language: English

Kaleidoscope is a 2016 British thriller film directed by Rupert Jones. The film premiered at the 2016 Chicago International Film Festival. On review aggregator Rotten Tomatoes, the film holds an approval rating of 62% based on 21 reviews, with an average rating of 6.46/10. On Metacritic, the film has a weighted average score of 52 out of 100, based on 8 critics, indicating "generally favorable reviews".

== Cast ==
- Toby Jones as Carl
- Anne Reid as Aileen
- Sinead Matthews as Abby
- Deborah Findlay as Maureen
