= Bad Wolf (production company) =

British television production company

Bad Wolf Ltd.
- Type: Subsidiary
- Industry: Television
- Founded: 2015; 11 years ago
- Founder: Julie Gardner; Jane Tranter
- Headquarters: Cardiff, Wales, UK
- Key people: Julie Gardner (founder); Jane Tranter (CEO); Natasha Hale (COO)
- Parent: Sony Pictures Television (2021–present)
- Divisions: Wolf Studios Wales
- Subsidiaries: Bad Wolf America (30%)
- Website: bad-wolf.com

Bad Wolf Ltd. is a television production company founded by Julie Gardner and Jane Tranter, incorporated on 15 July 2015, and based in Cardiff, Wales, United Kingdom. The company is responsible for the television series The Night Of, Beddgelert, A Discovery of Witches, His Dark Materials and Doctor Who (2023–2025).

== History ==
The company was founded in 2015 by former BBC executives Julie Gardner and Jane Tranter after leaving BBC Worldwide. During their time at the BBC, they worked with Russell T Davies on the 2005 relaunch of Doctor Who, which is made in Wales. The company name is a homage to the "Bad Wolf" storyline from the relaunched series. In 2015, it signed a first look deal with HBO.

In 2017, the company opened a new film and television studio in Cardiff, named Wolf Studios Wales. That same year, Bad Wolf's first production, The Night Of, was nominated for thirteen Emmys, of which it won five. Later that year, they also received investment from European media conglomerate Sky Group and American network HBO in return for minority stakes in the company.

The first episode of the company's His Dark Materials, which began an adaptation of the book series of the same name, was watched by approximately seven million people. This made the premiere the biggest new British series debut in over five years.

In April 2020, Bad Wolf announced that it had commenced work on I Hate Suzie starring Billie Piper, whom Gardner and Tranter's associate Russell T Davies had cast in the major role of Rose Tyler on Doctor Who.

On 24 September 2021, BBC Studios announced that Bad Wolf would become co-producer of Doctor Who itself starting in 2023, following the scheduled departure of the series' current showrunner, Chris Chibnall, who occupied the role from 2017 to 2022. Davies returned to his old role as showrunner, which he had occupied from 2005 to 2010, with Gardner returning as executive producer and Tranter joining also.

In October 2021, it was announced that Sony Pictures Television would acquire a majority of Bad Wolf, acquiring the remaining shares from HBO and Sky plc in December of that year. The deal brought in a new member, Natasha Hale, along with a long-term partnership to produce future productions and boost Cardiff's standing in the entertainment industry.

== Productions ==
=== Television series ===
Key
†	Denotes television productions that have not yet been released

Year	Title	Creator(s)	Distributor(s)	Notes
2016	The Night Of	Steven Zaillian; Richard Price	BBC Worldwide Productions	Owned by BBC
2017	Beddgelert	Medeni Griffiths	BBC Worldwide Productions	Owned by BBC
2018–2022	A Discovery of Witches	Deborah Harkness	Sky Vision (S1); NBCUniversal International Distribution (S2/S3)	Owned by NBCUniversal
2019–2022	His Dark Materials	Philip Pullman	BBC Studios (United Kingdom); HBO (International)	Owned by HBO and BBC
2020–present	Industry	Konrad Kay; Mickey Down	BBC Studios (United Kingdom); HBO (International)	Owned by HBO and BBC
2020–2022	I Hate Suzie	Lucy Prebble; Billie Piper	NBCUniversal International Distribution	Owned by NBCUniversal
2023	The Winter King	Kate Brooke; Ed Whitmore	Sony Pictures Television	
2023–2025	Doctor Who	Sydney Newman; C.E. Webber; Donald Wilson	BBC Studios (United Kingdom and Ireland); Disney+ (International, 2023–2025)	Owned by BBC
2023–2024	Tales of the TARDIS	Russell T Davies	BBC Studios	Owned by BBC
2024–present	Red Eye	Peter A. Dowling; Jingan Young	Sony Pictures Television	
2024	Lady in the Lake	Laura Lippman	Apple TV+	Under the Bad Wolf America banner
2025	Dope Girls	Polly Stenham; Alex Warren	Sony Pictures Television	
2025	The War Between the Land and the Sea	Russell T Davies	BBC Studios (United Kingdom and Ireland); Disney+ (International)	Owned by BBC
2026–present	The Other Bennet Sister	Janice Hadlow	Sony Pictures Television	
TBA	Berlin Noir	TBA	Apple TV	
TBA	Jupiter Island	Connor Hines	Netflix	
TBA	The Lords' Day	TBA	Netflix	
TBA	Untitled Dakota Fanning series	Alex Cary	Apple TV	Under the Bad Wolf America banner
