= Starve Acre =

2023 British horror film by Daniel Kokotajlo

- Theatrical release poster
- Directed by: Daniel Kokotajlo
- Written by: Daniel Kokotajlo
- Based on: Starve Acre by Andrew Michael Hurley
- Produced by: Tessa Ross; Juliette Howell; Emma Duffy; Derrin Schlesinger
- Starring: Matt Smith; Morfydd Clark
- Cinematography: Adam Scarth
- Edited by: Brenna Rangott
- Music by: Matthew Herbert
- Production companies: BBC Film; House Productions
- Distributed by: BFI Distribution
- Release dates: 12 October 2023 (LFF); 6 September 2024 (United Kingdom)
- Running time: 98 minutes
- Country: United Kingdom
- Language: English

Starve Acre is a 2023 British folk horror film written and directed by Daniel Kokotajlo, based upon the 2019 novel of the same name by Andrew Michael Hurley. The film stars Matt Smith and Morfydd Clark.

Starve Acre had its world premiere at the BFI London Film Festival on 12 October 2023, and was released in the United Kingdom on 6 September 2024.

== Plot ==
Richard, a university archaeology lecturer, and his wife, Jules, live with their young son Owen on Richard's deceased father's isolated farm on the moors. Owen, an asthmatic child, tells his mother he has been hearing whistling sounds from someone named Jack Grey. Richard reacts badly to this news, and he blames an old family friend, Gordon, who occasionally watches Owen when Richard is at work and Jules is out. Richard, who was abused by his father, believes Gordon has been telling frightening folk tales to their son. He insists Jules tell Gordon he cannot be around Owen anymore.

At a village fete, Owen plays football while Richard and Jules relax. Sudden screams - both human and animal - jolt them into action, and they rush toward a gathering crowd, where they find a young girl's pony has been viciously attacked and blinded. Owen sits miserably by himself, a bloody, sharpened stick in his hands.

Richard and Jules take Owen to a psychiatrist, where he undergoes testing, but nothing unusual is found. At home, Richard spends more time with Owen, and the child's sweet personality begins to return. One day, while Richard is at work, Jules takes a moment to herself outside the front door. She leaves the door open so she can hear Owen. She falls into a kind of trance as she watches an eerie mist settle over the farmyard, near the stone wall. When she comes back to herself, Owen is lying in the doorway. He is not breathing. Distraught, Jules calls Gordon and they rush Owen to the hospital.

Richard arrives at the hospital and finds his wife collapsed in grief. The doctor takes him aside and tells him his little boy has died from a severe asthma attack. Both parents are overcome with anguish.

Jules falls into a deep depression and can scarcely get out of bed. Her sister, Harrie, arrives to help. Gordon brings a local psychic, Mrs. Forde, to the house, hoping she can help Jules recover. Mrs. Forde cleanses the house and tells Jules that Owen is at peace. Jules and Harrie are startled when a candle abruptly goes out, then flares to life again. However, Jules slowly begins to recover. She and Harrie repaint Owen's room.

Richard, meanwhile, has found his father's journal, detailing his belief that there is an entrance in the farmyard where the spirit of nature can enter the real world. Richard begins an archaeological dig where the journal suggests the entrance can be found. The journal also details Richard's father's attempts to sacrifice his young son to the spirit.

During the dig, Richard uncovers the bones of a hare. He collects them and takes them to his study. When a strange organic material begins growing on the bones, Richard takes them to his university to show them to a colleague. The colleague, however, says he sees nothing unusual. The department's Professor then tells Richard he must take a year's sabbatical to help himself and his wife recover. Richard angrily gathers the bones and storms off.

Over a few days, the organic matter on the bones begins to resolve into muscle, sinew, nerves, and organs. The hare's heart begins to beat, and soon it is once again a normal-looking, furry, living animal. Jules begins to form an attachment to it. As Richard uncovers the roots of an enormous tree at his dig site, he realizes it is the spirit entrance his father wrote about. When his academic colleague shows up, endangering the find and the hare, Jules stabs him to death. She has begun looking upon the hare as her child, creating a nursery in Owen's old room for it.

Jules convinces Richard to accept the hare, Jack Grey, as their child. She confesses that she knew Owen was having a life-threatening asthma attack, but something told her she and Richard were better off without Owen. She willingly let him die. When Harrie bursts in and tries to intervene, Richard murders her. With Harrie's body lying at their feet, Richard and Jules bond affectionately over the hare, which Jules cuddles and nurses at her breast.

== Cast ==
- Matt Smith as Richard
- Morfydd Clark as Juliette
- Arthur Shaw as Owen
- Erin Richards as Harrie
- Robert Emms as Steven
- Sean Gilder as Gordon

== Release ==
The film had its world premiere at the BFI London Film Festival on 12 October 2023. In October 2023, BFI Distribution and Brainstorm Media acquired distribution rights to the film for the UK and the US, respectively.

Starve Acre was released in select cinemas in North America on 26 July 2024. It was released in the United Kingdom on 6 September 2024.

== Reception ==
On the review aggregator website Rotten Tomatoes, 83% of 70 critics' reviews are positive. The website's consensus reads: "Matt Smith and Morfydd Clark are terrific as embattled parents in Starve Acre, an upsetting folk horror tale that locates the doom in domesticity." Metacritic, which uses a weighted average, assigned the film a score of 66 out of 100, based on 18 critics, indicating "generally favorable" reviews.
