= Jellyfish (2018 film) =

2018 film directed by James Gardner

- Directed by: James Gardner
- Written by: James Gardner; Simon Lord
- Produced by: Nikolas Holttum
- Starring: Liv Hill; Sinead Matthews; Cyril Nri
- Cinematography: Peter Riches
- Edited by: Sian Clarke
- Music by: Victor-Hugo Fumagalli
- Release date: 2018
- Country: United Kingdom
- Language: English

Jellyfish is a 2018 British social-realist film. The film stars Liv Hill, Sinead Matthews and Cyril Nri.

== Plot ==
Sarah is a teenage carer to a mother with mental health issues and two younger children, holding the family together by various means including financially by a part-time job. The film develops increasing pressures with caring, school and work on Sarah; who resorts to increasingly desperate measures to juggle conflicting requirements. Her drama teacher's end-of-school showcase as the film's climax leads her to choose between life as a family carer and her newly discovered stand-up comedy talent.

== Cast ==
Liv Hill as Sarah Taylor

Sinead Matthews as Karen Taylor

Cyril Nri as Adam Hale

Angus Barnett as Vince

== Production ==
The film features and was predominantly shot in and around Margate, Kent.

== Release and reception ==
Jellyfish premiered at the 2018 Tribeca Film Festival. The Guardian gave the film three stars out of five, calling it a "striking directorial debut" by Gardner, and "an astonishingly good performance" by Hill, although also highlighted "occasional stumbles – a few too many jabs at gentrification, a couple of misfiring performances, and in places the budget constraints really show."

== Accolades ==
Hill and Matthews jointly won the Best Performance in a British Feature Film award at the 2018 Edinburgh Film Festival.
