= Apostasy (2017 film) =

2017 film directed by Daniel Kokotajlo

- Film poster
- Directed by: Daniel Kokotajlo (director)
- Written by: Daniel Kokotajlo
- Produced by: Andrea Cornwell; Marcie MacLellan
- Starring: Siobhan Finneran
- Cinematography: Adam Scarth
- Edited by: Napoleon Stratogiannakis
- Music by: Matthew Wilcock
- Production companies: iFeatures; Creative England; BBC Films; BFI; Oldgarth Media; Frank & Lively
- Distributed by: Curzon
- Release dates: 8 September 2017 (TIFF); 27 July 2018 (UK)
- Running time: 95 minutes
- Country: United Kingdom
- Languages: English; Urdu

Apostasy is a 2017 British drama film about Jehovah's Witnesses directed by Daniel Kokotajlo. It was screened in the Discovery section at the 2017 Toronto International Film Festival. Kokotajlo was nominated at the 2019 BAFTAs for the Outstanding Debut by a British Writer, Director or Producer.

The film follows two sisters who are brought up in a tightly knit group of Jehovah's Witnesses in Oldham and the tension that results from one of them being disfellowshipped.

== Plot ==
Oldham-based Jehovah's Witness Ivanna Whitling lives with her two adult daughters, Alex and Luisa, who are also members of the congregation. Alex, who works as a gardener, has just turned eighteen and her older sister attends college. Alex suffers from a medical condition that causes anemia but due to her religious beliefs, she cannot accept a blood transfusion in a medical emergency.

Luisa and Alex go door-knocking amongst the local Urdu-speaking Muslim population to spread their faith. After taking a walk with her family in the park, Luisa reveals that she is pregnant. Ivanna condemns Luisa for having sex outside of marriage with a Muslim. Luisa is disfellowshipped and an announcement is made at the Kingdom Hall indicating that she is "no longer one of Jehovah's Witnesses". As a result, Luisa is to be shunned by her family and religious community until she is reinstated. Luisa moves out and Ivanna is reminded by the elders that any contact with Luisa must only be that which is absolutely necessary.

A newly arrived elder named Steven introduces himself to Ivanna and Alex at a meeting. Steven then visits Alex at her home. Ivanna initially assumes this to be a shepherding visit but his intentions are actually to begin a courtship with Alex. At a gathering with friends, Alex collapses. The scene fades to black before showing Ivanna in despair outside a hospital. Luisa attends Alex's funeral but is ignored by the others present. She briefly talks to her mother in the cloak room after the funeral; they hug and Luisa cries loudly in grief.

After clarifying what is acceptable with the elders, arguing that Luisa needs some basic support as she is heavily pregnant, Ivanna proceeds to visit Luisa and help her clean her flat. Ivanna encourages Luisa to continue speaking to the elders and comments about the possibility of all of them seeing Alex soon in the new system. Ivanna meets with the elder Steven to ask if Luisa is ready for reinstatement, but he says that while she is on her way, it is not quite in her heart yet. He urges Ivanna to further minimize contact and to stop visiting Luisa, as unnecessary contact with disfellowshipped individuals is itself a disfellowshipping offence. Luisa meets with the elders and they ask her what she has done to demonstrate repentance; she states that she has been respecting the disfellowshipping arrangement, living on her own for seven months, attending meetings, and praying.

An elder opines that allowing Ivanna to clean her fridge is unnecessary contact. Luisa expresses frustration, saying that she has been doing all that she can and that she cannot do this anymore, before leaving in anger. She tells Ivanna that she finds the elders to be too demanding and controlling. Soon after this, Ivanna visits Luisa after she has given birth to a daughter named Leanne. Ivanna delights in holding her granddaughter, telling Luisa that she loves both of them very much. Ivanna and Luisa argue about the teachings of their religion, Ivanna making it clear that she wants Leanne to learn about God. When Luisa goes into the kitchen to get her mother a glass of water, Ivanna grabs Leanne out of her bassinet and takes her out to the car. As she is placing her on the back seat, Luisa runs out to the car and grabs Leanne. Ivanna mutters that she will "save" her granddaughter. The film concludes with a shot of Ivanna standing alone in a public space beside a stand of pamphlets promoting the faith.

== Cast ==
- Siobhan Finneran as Ivanna Whitling
- Robert Emms as Steven
- Sacha Parkinson as Luisa Whitling
- Jessica Baglow as Michelle
- Molly Wright as Alex Whitling

== Production ==
The film was written and directed by Daniel Kokotajlo), who had been raised as a member of the Jehovah's Witnesses but left in his early twenties. It was produced by Marcie MacLellan, who attended film school with Daniel in 2006. The film was shot in Manchester, UK. Principal photography took 21 days to complete.

== Reception ==
On review aggregator website Rotten Tomatoes, the film holds an approval rating of 97% based on 33 reviews, with an average rating of 7.9/10. Time Out reviewer Joseph Walsh praised the performances of Finneran, Parkinson, and Wright, while describing the film as "a standout British drama that pointedly asks us to question the strictures of institutionalised religion." Writing for The Sunday Times, Edward Porter called Apostasy "a moving depiction of a family constrained by the rules of life as Jehovah's Witnesses". The New Statesman reviewer Ryan Gilbey noted the film's "intensely controlled and concentrated ... sensitivity towards an austere religious community easily demonised." The film received over 21 nominations worldwide, including six BIFA nominations for Most Promising Newcomer (Molly Wright), Best Supporting Actress (Molly Wright), Best Debut Screenwriter (Daniel Kokotajlo), Best Casting (Michelle Smith) and Best Debut Producer (Marcie MacLellan). In 2018, the film won the Screen Award's Best Film of the Year.

== See also ==
- Postpartum depression
