= Short Works =

Series of original plays on BBC Radio 4

Short Works is a strand of short works of fiction broadcast since 2017 on BBC Radio 4. The 15-minute programmes feature newly commissioned works, often by new writers.
