= Liv Hill =

British actress (born 2000)

- Born: 22 June 2000 (age 26); Haverfordwest, Wales
- Education: The Talent 1st Organisation
- Occupation: Actress
- Years active: 2017–present

Liv Hill (born 22 June 2000) is a British actress. She received accolades for her roles in the BBC miniseries Three Girls (2017) and the film Jellyfish (2018). Her other credits include The Little Stranger (2018), The Fight (2018), Elizabeth is Missing (2019), The Great (2020), The Serpent Queen (2022), Disclaimer (2024), Miss Austen (2025), and Film Club (2025).

== Life ==
Hill was born in Haverfordwest, Wales. Her father was an Army officer, which led to her living in Cardiff, Germany, Oxford and Nottingham before her family settled in Derbyshire, when she was 9 years old. At age 15, Hill joined Talent 1st actors’ studio in Nottingham.

== Career ==
In 2017, Hill was BAFTA nominated for best supporting actress in her debut role in the BBC miniseries Three Girls, which was based on the Rochdale child sex abuse ring. In 2018, Hill was cast in the James Gardner directed British film Jellyfish, receiving a BIFA Nominated Most promising newcomer for her performance as young carer Sarah. The same year, Hill played Eve in episode 5: "Reclaim the Night" of Snatches: Moments from Women's Lives, a series which also included Jodie Comer.

In 2022, she portrayed the younger Catherine de' Medici in the TV series The Serpent Queen, alongside Samantha Morton, who played the older version of her.

In 2025, she played Mary Austen in the BBC series Miss Austen.

== Filmography ==
=== Film ===
Year	Title	Role	Notes
2018	Jellyfish	Sarah Taylor	
2018	The Little Stranger	Betty	
2018	The Fight	Jordan Chadwick	
2019	National Theatre Live: Top Girls	Angie	Filmed live
2019	This Is the Winter	Lou	Short film
2023	Black Dog	(unknown)	
2024	Down, Down, Down	Jude	Short film
2024	Bal Maiden	Loveday	Short film
2026	Faith	TBA	

=== Television ===
Year	Title	Role	Notes
2017	Three Girls	Ruby Bowen	Mini-series; 3 episodes
2018	Snatches: Moments from Women's Lives	Eve	Mini-series; 1 episode: "Reclaim the Night"
2019	Elizabeth Is Missing	Young Maud	Television film
2020	The Great	Angeline	Episode: "The Great"
2022	The Serpent Queen	Young Catherine de' Medici	4 episodes
2023	The Read	Narrator	Episode: "A Vision of Loveliness"
2024	Disclaimer	Sasha	Episode: "I"
2025	Miss Austen	Young Mary Austen	Mini-series; 4 episodes
2025	Film Club	Izzie	Mini-series; 6 episodes

== Awards and nominations ==
Year	Award	Category	Work	Result	Ref.
2018	British Academy Television Awards	BAFTA TV Award for Best Supporting Actress	Three Girls	Nominated	
2018	Edinburgh International Film Festival	Best Performance in a British Feature Film	Jellyfish	Won	
2018	Dinard British Film Festival	Special Mention Interpretation Award	Jellyfish	Won	
2018	British Independent Film Awards	Most Promising Newcomer	Jellyfish	Nominated	
2019	National Film Awards UK	Best Newcomer	Jellyfish	Nominated	
2019	London Critics Circle Film Awards	Young British/Irish Performer of the Year	Jellyfish and The Little Stranger	Nominated	
2019	The Stage Awards	Best Actress in a Play	Top Girls, Royal National Theatre	Nominated	
