= Daniel Kokotajlo (director) =

British film director (born 1980/81)

Daniel Kokotajlo (born 1980 or 1981) is a British film writer and director. He has also used the name Dan P. K. Smyth.

He wrote and directed the 2017 film Apostasy, which reflects his own experience of growing up as a Jehovah's Witness, and the 2023 film Starve Acre, based on Andrew Michael Hurley's novel of the same name.

Apostasy won the Writers' Guild of Great Britain award for "Best First Screenplay", and was nominated for the BAFTA Award for Outstanding Debut by a British Writer, Director or Producer in 2018, and for six British Independent Film Awards (BIFA).

Kokotajlo has a BA (2003) in textiles and fine art from Manchester Metropolitan University and an MA (2010) from the University of Westminster in screenwriting and film production.

== Filmography ==
=== Feature films ===
- Apostasy, 2017: writer and director
- Starve Acre, 2023: writer and director

=== Short films ===
- The Mess Hall of an Online Warrior (2010): writer and director
- Myra (2011): writer and director
- Every Good Boy Does Fine (2012): writer and director
- Gummy Man Rage (2012): writer and director
- Off Yer 'Ead (2014): writer and director
