= Janice Hadlow =

British television executive (born 1957)

Janice Vivienne Hadlow (born November 1957) is a British writer and former BBC television executive. She was the controller of the BBC television channel BBC Two, taking over this position in November 2008 having previously been controller of BBC Four. At the beginning of March 2014 she assumed a new post within the BBC responsible for special projects and seasons. Hadlow's post was abolished when she left the BBC in 2016. She has written a non-fiction book, A Royal Experiment: The Private Life of King George III (2014), and a novel, The Other Bennet Sister (2020).

== Early life ==
Hadlow was born in Lewisham, and educated at a comprehensive school in Swanley (now called Orchards Academy), in north Kent, and graduated with a BA in History from King's College London in 1978. She then spent time as a postgraduate history researcher at Royal Holloway, University of London (1978–81).

== BBC career ==
Hadlow began her media career with the BBC in 1986 as a production trainee. For two years between 1987 and 1989 she was a producer for BBC Radio 4 in the Current Affairs and Magazines department, where she produced Woman's Hour before moving to television. She worked in the BBC's Music and Arts department between 1993 and 1995 before become joint-head of the History department. One of the television shows she helped to create in this period was Simon Schama's A History of Britain.

In 1999, Hadlow moved to Channel 4 where she became Head of History, Art and Religion, followed by Head of Specialist Factual in 2002 where she commissioned various works, including David Starkey's series The Six Wives of Henry VIII.

According to her "Inside BBC" biography, other works she commissioned were "highly successful and award-winning programmes from most factual genres including history, science, arts and religion, including... Elizabeth, The 1940s House, Edwardian Country House, The Boy Whose Skin Fell Off, Operatunity and The Death of Klinghoffer (which won an Emmy)."

She returned to the BBC as Controller of BBC Four after five years and specialised in commissioning programmes concerning factual genres such as history, science and religion. In 2004 The Observer included Hadlow in a list of 80 young people who they believed would shape people's lives in the early 21st Century and in 2006 sister-paper The Guardian praised her for her work over the preceding 18-months at BBC Four.

In 2008, Hadlow became controller of BBC Two, then was joint controller of BBC Two and BBC Four from 2013. In February 2014, she stood down from the post of channel controller taking up a new post responsible for special projects and seasons. She was succeeded by Kim Shillinglaw. Among the decisions taken by Hadlow as controller was the 2013 cancellation of the Golden Globe-nominated and Emmy award-winning BBC drama, The Hour, starring Ben Whishaw, Romola Garai and Dominic West, after its second season. It was announced in January 2016 that Hadlow would be leaving the BBC, and that her post would be abolished.

== Writing ==
Her book, A Royal Experiment: The Private Life of King George III, was published by Henry Holt and Company in October 2014. Her first novel, The Other Bennet Sister, was published in March 2020.

Media offices
Preceded by Roly Keating	Controller of BBC Four; 2004–2008	Succeeded by Richard Klein
Preceded by Roly Keating	Controller of BBC Two; 2008–2014	Succeeded by Kim Shillinglaw
