= Tom Ward =

British film, stage and television actor (born 1971)

- Born: 11 January 1971 (age 55); Swansea, Wales
- Citizenship: United Kingdom
- Education: Lincoln College, Oxford
- Occupation: Actor
- Years active: 1991–present
- Spouse: Emily Hohler (m. 2001)
- Children: 3

Tom Ward (born 11 January 1971) is a Welsh-born British film, stage and television actor. He is best known for playing Dr. Harry Cunningham in the long-running BBC crime drama series Silent Witness from 2002 to 2012.

== Early life ==
Ward was born in Swansea in Wales. He attended Dragon School in Oxford and The King's School in Canterbury. He then studied at Lincoln College at the University of Oxford.

== Career ==
In 1998, he played the role of George Osborne in the BBC miniseries Vanity Fair, an adaptation of William Makepeace Thackeray's 1848 novel of the same name.

In 2000, he appeared in the Channel 4 miniseries Anna Karenina, an adaptation of Leo Tolstoy's 1877 novel of the same name.

In 2002, Ward joined the sixth season of the BBC forensic drama series Silent Witness. His character, a forensic pathology student, trained under the direction of the series protagonist Sam Ryan (Amanda Burton). He stayed with the series until series 15 in 2012, when his character relocated to New York.

He also featured in the Doctor Who Christmas special "The Snowmen" at the end of 2012. He also appeared in Death in Paradise in early 2013.

In December 2013, Ward played Colonel Fitzwilliam in a BBC television adaptation of Death Comes to Pemberley.

In December 2015, he appeared in Harry Price: Ghost-Hunter, an ITV drama, alongside Rafe Spall and Cara Theobald.

== Personal life ==
He married Emily Hohler, a journalist and nutritional therapist, in 2001. They have three children together.

== Filmography ==
Film and television
| Year | Title | Role | Notes |
|---|---|---|---|
| 1991 | Lethal Justice | Bartel | |
| 1991 | The Storyteller: Greek Myths | Athenian | TV series, episode: "Theseus & the Minotaur" |
| 1995 | Pride and Prejudice | Lt. Chamberlayne | TV series, episode 1.2 |
| 1996 | Island | Dominic | TV series, regular cast member |
| 1996 | Public Enemies | Paymaster | |
| 1996 | The Fortunes and Misfortunes of Moll Flanders | Lemuel | TV film |
| 1998 | Vanity Fair | George Osborne | TV mini-series |
| 1999 | Plunkett & Macleane | Backbench Heckler | |
| 1999 | Warriors | Capt. Richard Gurney | TV serial |
| 2000 | Anna Karenina | Yashvin | |
| 2000 | Quills | The Horseman | |
| 2001 | Love in a Cold Climate | Alfred | TV mini-series |
| 2001 | The Infinite Worlds of H. G. Wells | H. G. Wells | TV mini-series |
| 2001 | Midsomer Murders | Tristan Goodfellow | TV series, episode: "Destroying Angel" |
| 2001 | The Lost World | Lord John Phillip Roxton | TV film |
| 2001 | Red Cap | Capt. Dominic Railton | |
| 2002 | The Heart of Me | Kevin Brown | Short film |
| 2002–2012 | Silent Witness | Dr. Harry Cunningham | TV series, regular cast member |
| 2003 | Ready When You Are, Mr. McGill | Roland | TV film |
| 2004 | Hawking | Roger Penrose | TV film |
| 2007 | Instinct | Ian Stanford | TV film |
| 2010 | Marple: The Pale Horse | Captain Cottam | TV film |
| 2012 | Doctor Who | Captain Latimer | 2012 Christmas Special, "The Snowmen" |
| 2013 | Death in Paradise | Alex Seymour | 1 episode |
| 2013 | Death Comes to Pemberley | Colonel Fitzwilliam | TV mini-series |
| 2015–2017 | The Frankenstein Chronicles | Sir Robert Peel | TV series |
| 2015 | Harry Price: Ghost Hunter | Edward Goodwin | TV film |
| 2017–2021 | Abandoned Engineering | Narrator | TV series |
| 2023–2024 | Hitler's Engineers: Building the Third Reich | Narrator | TV series |
