= Pemberley =

Fictional place in Pride and Prejudice

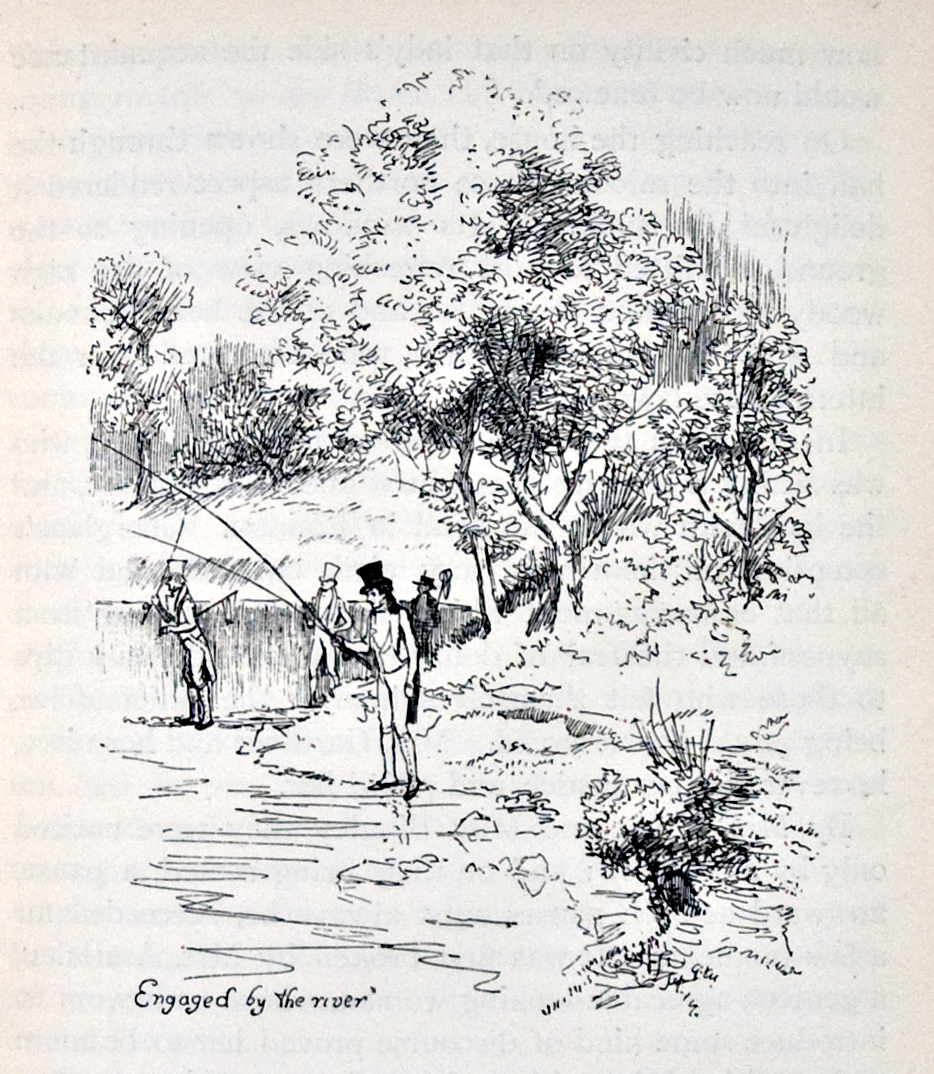
Mr. Gardiner, Mr. Darcy and others enjoying the river at Pemberley. Illustration by Hugh Thomson for an 1894 edition.

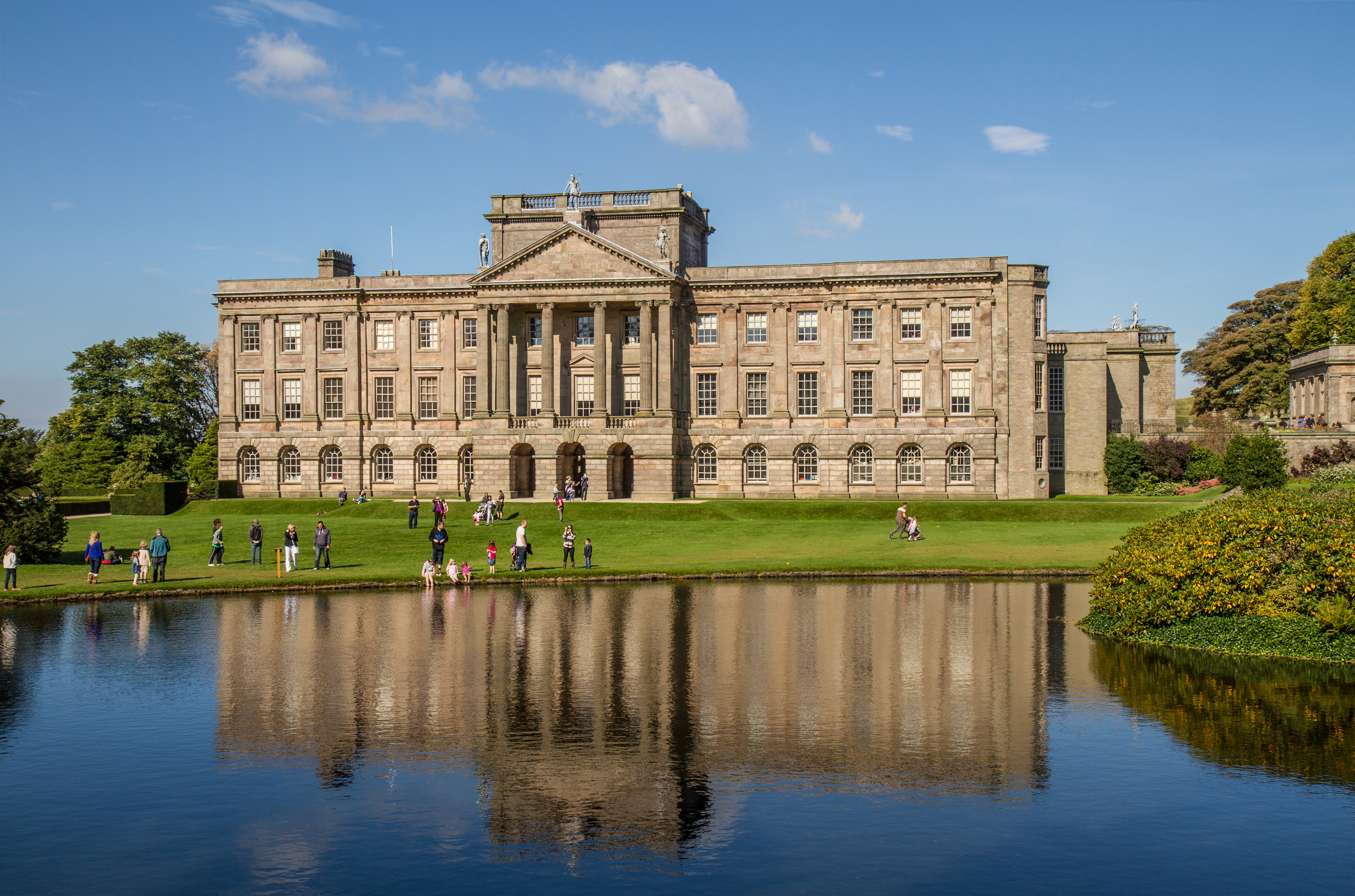
Lyme Park, Cheshire.

Pemberley is the fictional country estate owned by Fitzwilliam Darcy, the male protagonist in Jane Austen's 1813 novel Pride and Prejudice. It is located near the fictional town of Lambton, and believed by some to be based on Lyme Park, south of Disley in Cheshire.

In describing the estate, Austen uses uncharacteristically explicit symbolism to represent the geographical home of the man at the centre of the novel. On first visiting the estate, Elizabeth Bennet is charmed by the beauty of the surrounding countryside, as indeed she is by Mr. Darcy himself. Elizabeth had already rejected Mr. Darcy's first proposal by the time she visits Pemberley—it is his letter, the praise of his housekeeper, and his own courteous behaviour at Pemberley that bring about a change in her opinion of Mr. Darcy.

== In Pride and Prejudice ==
They gradually ascended for half a mile, and then found themselves at the top of a considerable eminence, where the wood ceased, and the eye was instantly caught by Pemberley House, situated on the opposite side of a valley, into which the road with some abruptness wound. It was a large, handsome, stone building, standing well on rising ground, and backed by a ridge of high woody hills; and in front, a stream of some natural importance was swelled into greater, but without any artificial appearance. Its banks were neither formal, nor falsely adorned. Elizabeth was delighted. She had never seen a place where nature had done more, or where natural beauty had been so little counteracted by an awkward taste. They were all of them warm in their admiration; and at that moment she felt that to be mistress of Pemberley might be something!
– Jane Austen (1813)

== In other media ==
=== Books and plays ===
- Death Comes to Pemberley by P. D. James is set at Pemberley after the events of Pride and Prejudice.
- Darkness at Pemberley by T. H. White is partially set at Pemberley in the early 20th century, featuring descendants of the characters of Pride and Prejudice.
- Miss Bennet: Christmas at Pemberley by Lauren Gunderson and Margot Melcon is set at Pemberley and features characters from Pride and Prejudice

=== Film, television and video ===
- Dyrham Park stood in for Pemberley in the 1967 BBC adaptation of Pride and Prejudice starring Lewis Fiander and Celia Bannerman. The last scene of the series shows the married couple looking down at Pemberley.
- Renishaw Hall was the setting for Pemberley in the 1980 BBC adaptation of Pride and Prejudice starring Elizabeth Garvie and David Rintoul, adapted by Fay Weldon.
- Lyme Park was used to represent Pemberley for the 1995 television series of Pride and Prejudice starring Jennifer Ehle and Colin Firth.
- Chatsworth House was used for the exterior scenes for Joe Wright's 2005 film version of Pride and Prejudice starring Keira Knightley and Matthew Macfadyen. Chatsworth is mentioned by Austen as one of the great houses Elizabeth visits before Pemberley, and the Chatsworth website suggests the author was thinking of the house when describing Pemberley. Wilton House was used for many of the interior scenes.
- Harewood House was used to depict Pemberley in the ITV fantasy series Lost in Austen. This was not a direct adaptation of Pride and Prejudice, but the novel provided the majority of the plots, characters and inspiration.
- Chatsworth was again used for exterior, and some interior, scenes for the BBC adaptation of Death Comes to Pemberley. Some interior scenes were filmed at Harewood House.
- Pemberley Press is the name of the publishing house that Bridget Jones works at in the 2001 film Bridget Jones's Diary, in homage to Pride and Prejudice.
- In The Lizzie Bennet Diaries, a vlog-style modern adaptation of Pride and Prejudice, Pemberley Digital is the name of Darcy's company. Darcy says Pemberley is the name of the place that his father's family comes from in England.
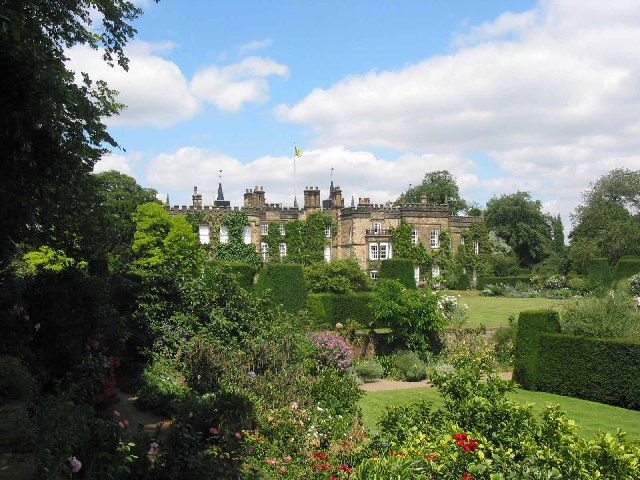
Renishaw Hall which represented Pemberley in the 1980 TV serial

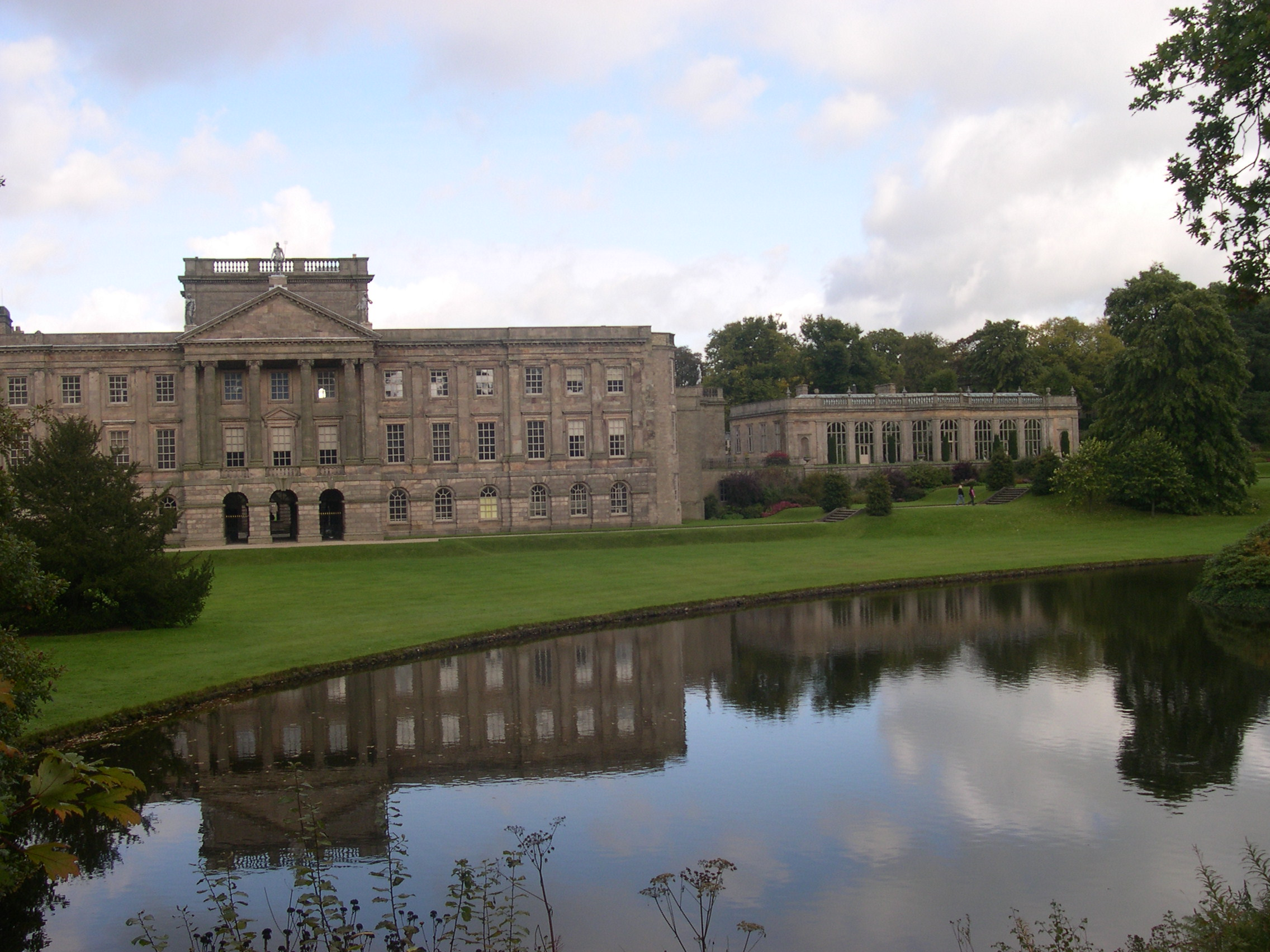
Lyme Park which represented Pemberley in the 1995 TV serial

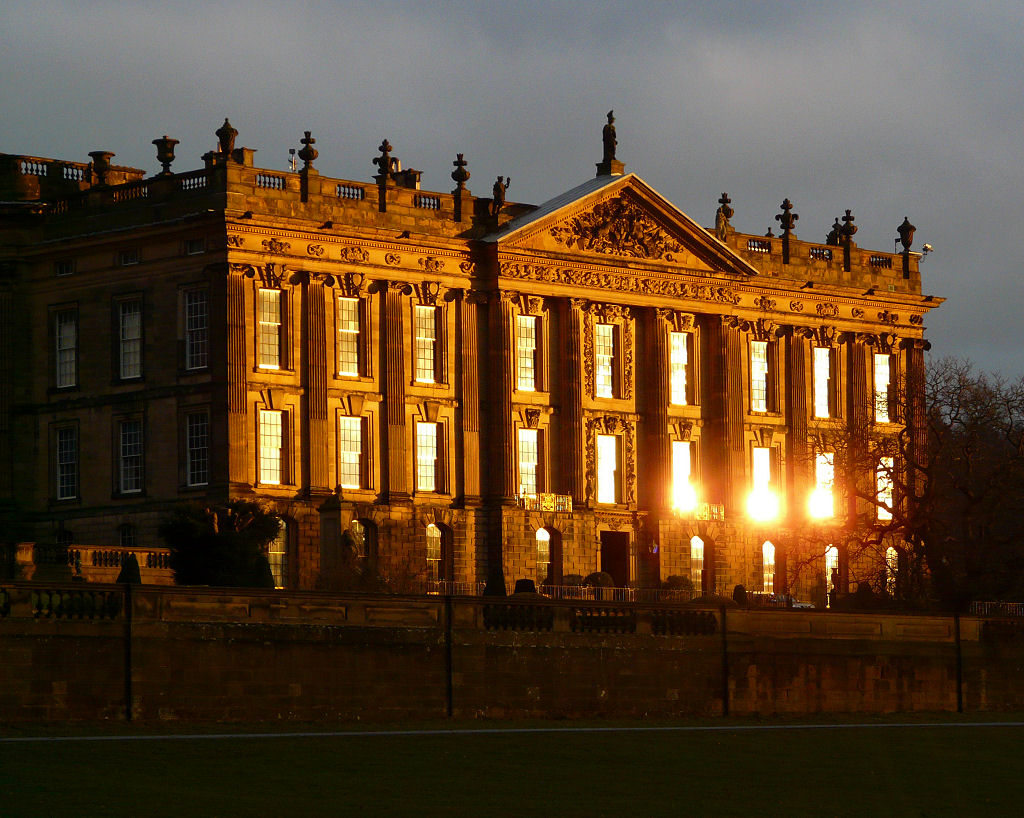
Chatsworth House which represented Pemberley in the 2005 film

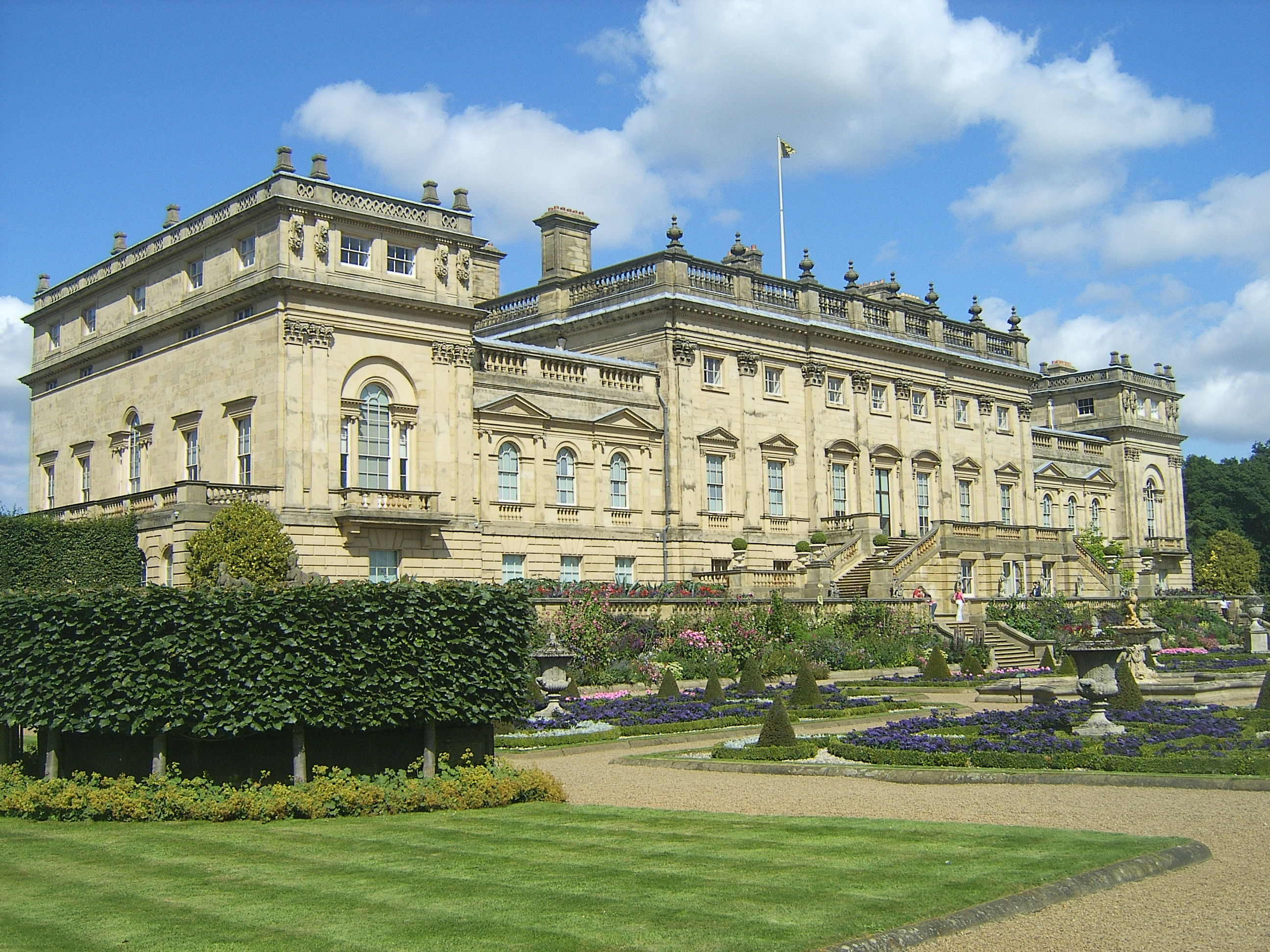
Harewood House which represented Pemberley in Lost in Austen
