= Alistair Petrie =

British actor

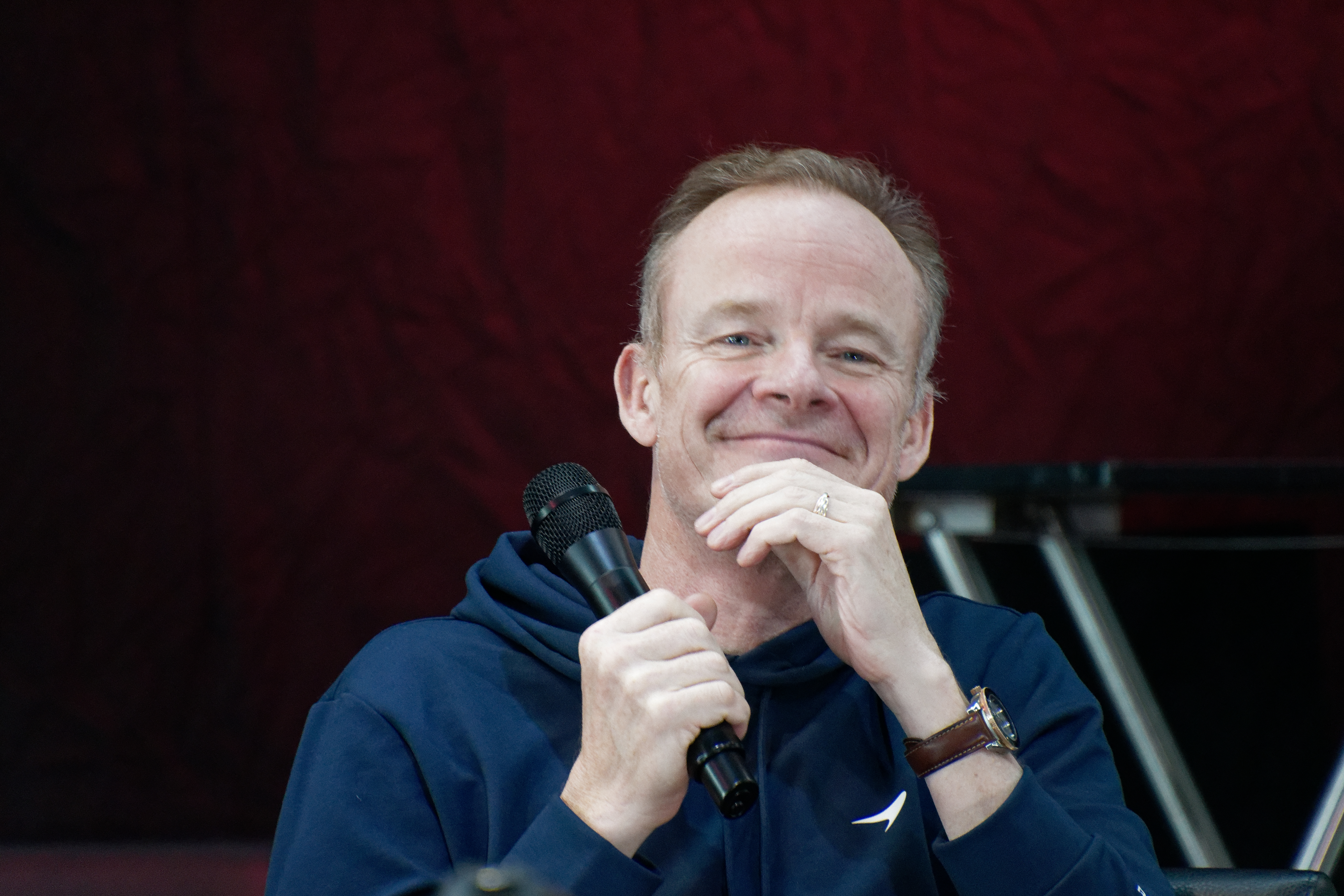
- Petrie in 2025
- Born: 30 September 1970 (age 55); Catterick, Yorkshire, England
- Education: London Academy of Music and Dramatic Art (BA)
- Occupation: Actor
- Years active: 1993–present
- Spouse: Lucy Scott
- Children: 3

Alistair Petrie (born 30 September 1970) is a British actor. He has starred in The Bank Job (2008), Cloud Atlas (2012), Rush (2013) and Rogue One: A Star Wars Story (2016). Petrie has also starred in the Channel 4 television series Utopia, the BBC One television series The Night Manager, Sherlock, and Undercover, and as Mr. Groff in the Netflix original comedy-drama series Sex Education.

== Early life and education ==
Petrie was born on 30 September 1970 in Catterick, North Yorkshire. He was brought up in the Middle East, mainland Europe, and East Africa.

He trained at the London Academy of Music and Dramatic Art.

== Career ==
=== Theatre ===
In 2008, Petrie played the lead role of Man in Mine, Shared Experience at the West Yorkshire Playhouse, Leeds.

=== Screen ===
Petrie appeared as Philip Lisle in The Bank Job, as Felix Finch in the 2012 film Cloud Atlas, as Stirling Moss in Rush, and as General Davits Draven in Rogue One: A Star Wars Story.

He played the role of Major James Sholto in the second episode of Season 3 of the BBC TV series Sherlock, which aired on 5 January 2014.

In 2018, he played Dr. Stephen Stanley in The Terror (based on the novel of the same name), a supernatural horror series about Franklin's lost expedition. In 2019, Petrie began playing Mr. Groff in the Netflix original comedy-drama series Sex Education.

== Personal life ==
Petrie is married to actress Lucy Scott, with whom he has three sons.

Petrie is an Ambassador for Borne, a medical research charity looking to identify the causes of premature birth. In 2007, he and his wife swam the English Channel to fundraise for the charity, becoming the first married couple to complete the crossing.

Petrie is close friends with actor Connor Swindells, his former costar and on-screen son. He officiated Swindells' marriage to actress Amber Anderson.

== Filmography ==
=== Film ===
Year	Title	Role	Notes
1997	Mrs Dalloway	Herbert	
2005	Man to Man	Beckinsale	
2007	The Mark of Cain	Major Rod Gilchrist	
2008	The Bank Job	Philip Lisle	
2008	The Duchess	Heaton	
2008	A Bunch of Amateurs	Rupert Twist	
2010	Devil's Playground	Andy Billing	
2012	Metamorphosis	The Supervisor	
2012	Cloud Atlas	Haskell Moore's Dinner Guest 1 Musician; Felix Finch; Lascivious Businessman	
2012	Ashes	Dr. Burrows	
2013	Rush	Stirling Moss	
2013	Vendetta	DCI Spencer Holland	
2014	The Face of an Angel	Steve	
2014	A Little Chaos	De Ville	
2015	Kicking Off	Anthony Greaves	
2015	Victor Frankenstein	Chief Inspector	
2015	Silent Hours	Lieutenant Charles Carter	
2016	God's Kingdom	Alexander	Short film
2016	Rogue One	General Draven	
2017	Hampstead	Steve Crowley	
2019	Hellboy	Lord Adam Glaren	
2019	A Battle in Waterloo	Kildare	Short film
2020	Sulphur and White	Jeff	
2021	The Cursed / Eight for Silver	Seamus Laurent	
2024	Magpie	Richard	

=== Television ===
Year	Title	Role	Notes
1993	Demob	Hodges	Episodes: "Episode 1", "Episode 5"
1993	Scarlet and Black	Hussar	Miniseries; Episode #1.3
1994	All Quiet on the Preston Front	Big Matt	Episode: "Diesel's Garage"
1996	Emma	Robert Martin	TV movie
1998	Game On	Charles	Episode: "Wedding Day"
1998	Jonathan Creek	Duncan Proctor	Episodes: "The Problem at Gallows Gate: Part 1", "The Problem at Gallows Gate: Part 2"
1999	My Wonderful Life	Ollie	Episode: "Chinese Walls"
1999	Dalziel and Pascoe	Young James Westropp	Episode: "Recalled to Life"
2000	The Stretch	Jonathon Nichols	Miniseries
2000	Second Sight	Neil	Episode: "Parasomnia"
2002, 2011	Holby City	Mark Noble; Colonel John Appleton	Episodes: "Second Chances", "No Credit, No Blame"
2002–2003	The Forsyte Saga	George Forsyte	Miniseries
2002	Celeb	Photographer	Episode: "The Guest"
2003	State of Mind	Nick Grainger	Miniseries
2006	Perfect Disaster	Doug	Series documentary, Episode: "Mega Flood"
2007	The Whistleblowers	Christopher Rowe	Episode: "No Child Left Behind"
2007	Cranford	Major Gordon	Episodes: "August 1842", "May 1843"
2008	Mutual Friends	Carl Cato	4 episodes
2009	Gracie!	Basil Dean	TV movie
2010	The Taking of Prince Harry	Jack Pastor	TV movie
2011	Midsomer Murders	Clifford Bunting	Episode: "Not in My Back Yard"
2011	Strike Back	Kenneth Bratton	Episodes: "Project Dawn #3", "Project Dawn #4"
2011	Death in Paradise	Gordon Foster	Episode #1.5
2012	Whitechapel	Dr. Simon Mortlake	2 episodes
2013	The Suspicions of Mr Whicher: The Murder In Angel Lane	Dr. Casement	TV movie
2013	The Escape Artist	Julian Fowkes	Miniseries; Episode: "Part 1"
2013	Lucan	Jimmy Goldsmith	TV movie
2013–2014	Utopia	Geoff	Recurring role, 11 episodes
2014	Sherlock	Major James Sholto	Episode: "The Sign of Three"
2014	Vera	Stuart Bayliss	Episode: "On Harbour Street"
2014	The Game	Andrew	Miniseries; Episode: "Episode 4"
2016–present	The Night Manager	Lord Sandy Langbourne	Regular role
2016	Undercover	Robert Greenlaw	Miniseries
2016	New Blood	Charles Matherson	2 episodes
2016	Harley and the Davidsons	Edsel Ford	Episode: "Legacy"
2017	Year of the Rabbit	Mr. Larkham	Miniseries
2017	Genius	Heinrich Weber	Recurring role
2018	The Terror	Dr. Stephen Samuel Stanley	Recurring role; 6 episodes
2018–2019	Deep State	George White	Main role
2019–2023	Sex Education	Mr. Groff	Series regular
2020	Agatha and the Midnight Murders	Sir Malcolm Campbell	TV movie
2022	Why Didn't They Ask Evans?	Rev Richard Jones	Series regular
2023	Funny Woman	Ted Sargent	
2023	The Following Events Are Based on a Pack of Lies	Dr Robert Chance	Series lead
2025	Andor	General Draven	4 episodes
2025	Death by Lightning	John Sherman	Miniseries

=== Video games ===
Year	Title	Role	Notes
2022	A Plague Tale: Requiem	Count Victor de Arles	Voice
2024	Flintlock: The Siege of Dawn	Enki	Voice
2024	Warhammer 40,000: Space Marine 2	Sorcerer Lord Imurah	Voice
2025	Elden Ring: Nightreign	Scholar	Voice
2026	Warhammer 40,000: Dawn of War IV	Primarch Lion El'Johnson	Voice
