= Lucy Scott =

British actress

- Born: 19 January 1971 (age 55); Stradsett, Norfolk, England
- Education: Central School of Speech and Drama (BA)
- Years active: 1993–present
- Spouse: Alistair Petrie

Lucy Scott (born 19 January 1971) is a British actress. She is known for playing Charlotte Lucas in the 1995 BBC production Pride and Prejudice.

== Career ==
Lucy Scott has worked as an actress, in film and television since the early 1990s. She trained at the Central School of Speech & Drama. Her stage credits include Emma at the Tricycle Theatre, London, as part of a seven-person ensemble cast; Search and Destroy, as Mary, at the New End Theatre in Hampstead, London; and as Nikki in Things We Do For Love.

She also appeared in an episode of comedy show Modern Toss.

As well as acting, Scott worked as a script supervisor on the first episode of Popetown, called The Double.

== Select credits ==
- Spooks
  - Episode #5.9 as Librarian (2006)
- Rosemary & Thyme
  - Seeds of Time as Caroline Pargeter (2006)
- Tom Brown's Schooldays as Mrs Frances Arthur (2005)
- Perks as Alex Wright (2003)
- The Inspector Lynley Mysteries
  - For the Sake of Elena as Bernadette (2002)
- Pride and Prejudice as Charlotte Lucas (1995)
- Micky Love as Martin's secretary (1993)
