= Death Comes to Pemberley (TV series) =

2013 British television series

- First episode titles
- Genre: Drama
- Based on: Death Comes to Pemberley by P. D. James
- Written by: Juliette Towhidi
- Directed by: Daniel Percival
- Starring: Matthew Rhys; Anna Maxwell Martin; Jenna Coleman; Matthew Goode; Trevor Eve; Alexandra Moen; Tom Ward; Eleanor Tomlinson; Rebecca Front; James Fleet; Penelope Keith; Joanna Scanlan; James Norton; Nichola Burley; Philip Martin Brown; Kevin Eldon
- Composer: The Insects
- Country of origin: United Kingdom
- Original language: English
- No. of series: 1
- No. of episodes: 3

Production
- Executive producers: Ed Rubin; Joanie Blaikie; P. D. James; Justin Thomson-Glover (Far Moor); Patrick Irwin (Far Moor); Rebecca Eaton (Masterpiece); Polly Hill (BBC)
- Production locations: Yorkshire; Derbyshire
- Cinematography: Steve Lawes
- Running time: 60 minutes (each episode)
- Production companies: Origin Pictures, Masterpiece co-production

Original release
- Network: BBC One
- Release: 26 December – 28 December 2013

Death Comes to Pemberley is a three-part British television drama based on the best-selling 2011 P. D. James novel of the same name. Her murder mystery was based on the style and characters of Jane Austen's 1813 novel Pride and Prejudice.

The series was commissioned by Controller of BBC Drama Commissioning Ben Stephenson and then-Controller of BBC One Danny Cohen, and was first broadcast from 26 to 28 December 2013 on BBC One.

== Premise ==
It is June 1803, six years after the marriage of Mr Fitzwilliam Darcy and Miss Elizabeth Bennet, as recounted in Pride and Prejudice. One evening, George Wickham and his wife Lydia (Elizabeth's sister) are travelling by carriage to Pemberley for a ball with Captain Denny. Wickham and Denny have an argument, and leave the carriage in anger. The two men disappear into the woodland, where Lydia hears two gunshots. After being informed, Darcy sends out a search party, who find Wickham distraught and hysterical, holding Denny's body and blaming himself for his murder.

== Cast ==
- Matthew Rhys as Fitzwilliam Darcy
- Anna Maxwell Martin as Elizabeth Darcy
- Jenna Coleman as Lydia Wickham
- Matthew Goode as George Wickham
- Trevor Eve as Sir Selwyn Hardcastle
- Alexandra Moen as Jane Bingley
- Rebecca Front as Mrs Bennet
- James Fleet as Mr Bennet
- Penelope Keith as Lady Catherine de Bourgh
- Joanna Scanlan as Mrs Reynolds
- Tom Ward as Colonel Fitzwilliam
- Eleanor Tomlinson as Georgiana Darcy
- James Norton as Mr Henry Alveston
- Nichola Burley as Louisa Bidwell
- Philip Martin Brown as Mr Bidwell
- Kevin Eldon as Dr McFee
- Jennifer Hennessy as Mrs Bidwell
- Lewis Rainer as Will Bidwell
- Mariah Gale as Mrs Younge
- Teresa Churcher as Mrs Piggott
- Tom Canton as Captain Martin Denny
- Oliver Maltman as George Pratt
- David Blockley as Footman
- Olly Rix as Cartwright

== Production ==
=== Casting ===
The cast was announced on 18 June 2013. The series was cast by Gary Davy. Actor Tom Ward, who plays Colonel Fitzwilliam, is the only cast member to have previously played a role in an adaptation of Pride and Prejudice. He played Lt Chamberlayne in the 1995 BBC adaptation.

=== Filming ===
Filming began in June 2013 on location in Yorkshire and Derbyshire and has been supported with investment from Screen Yorkshire. Chatsworth House in Derbyshire was used as the exterior of Pemberley, and rooms at Chatsworth and at Castle Howard and Harewood House, both in Yorkshire, were used for indoor scenes. Areas of National Trust land, including Hardcastle Crags, Fountains Abbey and the Studley Royal estate and Treasurer's House, were also used in filming. Beverley's Guildhall provided the location for a courtroom. The gallows scenes were filmed on a purpose-built scaffold outside York Crown Court, with Wickham emerging from the gate to the old debtors' prison in the York Museum.

== Episodes ==
No.	Title	Directed by	Written by	Original release date	UK viewers (millions)
1	"Episode One"	Daniel Percival	Juliette Towhidi	26 December 2013	7.81
Elizabeth and her husband of six years, Mr Darcy, are in the midst of preparing for a ball at Pemberley. Elizabeth makes a charity visit to Mrs Bidwell, a tenant living in a cottage on the estate with her daughter, Louisa (a maid at Pemberley) - they are looking after a newborn, who is the son of Louisa's married sister. Mrs Bidwell's son, Will, is terminally ill and bedridden. Mr Bidwell is away. Pemberley welcomes Elizabeth's parents and Mr. Darcy's cousin, Colonel Fitzwilliam. Two family members are not invited: Elizabeth's sister, Lydia and her ne'er-do-well husband, George Wickham, who once attempted to seduce Darcy's sister, Georgiana, into eloping with him (in Jane Austen's novel 'Pride and Prejudice'). Fitzwilliam romantically pursues Georgiana, but Elizabeth knows she is in love with Henry Alveston, a young lawyer. Late that night, an hysterical Lydia arrives at Pemberley. She says Wickham argued with their travelling companion, Captain Denny, who ordered the coach stopped and then ran into the woods with Wickham in pursuit. After hearing two shots, Lydia ordered the coach to drive to Pemberley. A search party soon finds Denny dead and Wickham bloodied and semi-conscious. Darcy contacts the local magistrate, Sir Selwyn Hardcastle, who investigates and arrests Wickham for murder.
2	"Episode Two"	Daniel Percival	Juliette Towhidi	27 December 2013	6.00
Fitzwilliam visits Wickham in jail. Fitzwilliam has a reason for keeping quiet, though he has a solid alibi for the murder. Elizabeth cancels the ball while assuring staff they have nothing to fear. She is intrigued by fragments of a torn letter she finds in which the writer asks to meet Darcy in the woods. She tells Hardcastle about seeing a woman believed to be the ghost roaming the woods but Elizabeth is certain she was mortal. Elizabeth and Darcy quarrel because Darcy supports Fitzwilliam marrying Georgiana, while Elizabeth believes she should make her own unfettered choice. Though Georgiana declines Alveston's marriage proposal, he attends the inquest with Darcy, where it is decided Wickham will stand trial for murder. Believing he will be acquitted, Wickham persuades Darcy to fund his and Lydia's travel to the New World. Meanwhile, Elizabeth learns that Wickham, using a false name, seduced Louisa and that the newborn is her and Wickam's son. Elizabeth brings Louisa into court where, upon recognizing Wickham, she openly calls out to him.
3	"Episode Three"	Daniel Percival	Juliette Towhidi	28 December 2013	6.05
In jail awaiting trial, Wickham admits to Darcy that he fathered Louisa Bidwell's child. Louisa tells Elizabeth that on the morning of the murder, she met with Captain Denny and a woman who would adopt the baby. This is the woman who has been mistaken as the ghost. She is Wickham's sister, Mrs Younge, who years before had lured Georgiana to Wickham. Louisa has decided to keep her baby, however. She also saw Colonel Fitzwilliam at the abbey that morning. Sir Selwyn Hardcastle learns Wickham is the infant's father, which is a motive for the murder. Darcy discovers that Fitzwilliam engineered the adoption, illegally acting on Darcy's behalf. After being discovered, Fitzwilliam gives up Georgiana, leaving her free to marry Alveston. Pub landlady, Mrs Piggott, testifies to witnessing Wickham arguing with Captain Denny. Based on his self-incriminating confession and Mrs Piggott's account, Wickham is found guilty and sentenced to hang. Distraught, Mrs Younge rushes from the court room and is accidentally killed by a carriage. Rev. Oliphant and Elizabeth visit Mr and Mrs Bidwell, where Will, near death, gives a signed confession: when the uniformed Denny arrived at the cottage looking for Louisa, Will mistook him for the soldier who seduced Louisa. He attacked Denny and then chased him. Denny fell into a ditch and hit his head on a large stone. Wickham arrived and found Denny dying. He saw Will and fired Denny's gun at him, so Will fled. Wickham is found innocent, and he and Lydia depart for the New World. Alveston and Georgiana become engaged. Darcy tells Elizabeth that Louisa does not have to give up her child as had been previously arranged. Elizabeth reveals to a delighted Darcy that she is pregnant.

== Reception ==
The Guardian described the tone of the first episode as respectful of Austen's original, but "not afraid to stand out and be its own very different thing as well", describing it as a "mashup" between period drama and Agatha Christie or Midsomer Murders. A later Guardian review described the series as "pretty much perfect Christmas TV", praising the appearance of the series and the "satisfying plot". Lina Talbot, writing for The Independent, praised the casting of Mr and Mrs Bennet. The Radio Times praised the production values of the piece, and noted that they were supported by a "meaty" plot.
