= Matthew Goode =

English actor (born 1978)

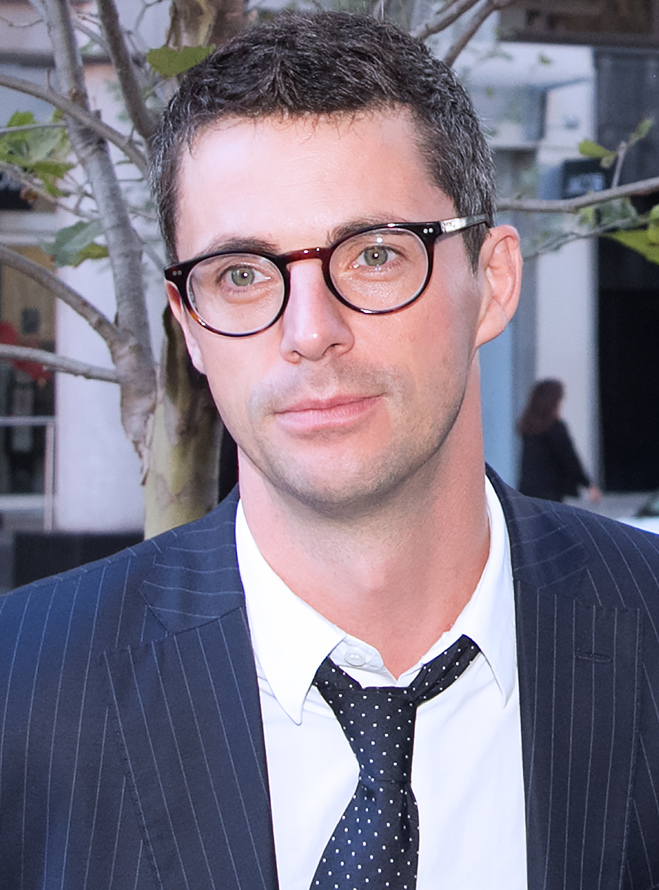
- Goode at the 2014 Toronto Film Festival
- Born: Matthew William Goode; 3 April 1978 (age 48); Exeter, Devon, England
- Education: University of Birmingham
- Occupation: Actor
- Years active: 2002–present
- Spouse: Sophie Dymoke
- Children: 3

Matthew William Goode (born 3 April 1978) is an English actor. He made his screen debut in 2002 with ABC's television film Confessions of an Ugly Stepsister. His breakthrough role was in the romantic comedy Chasing Liberty (2004), for which he received a nomination at the Teen Choice Awards for Choice Breakout Movie Star – Male. He then appeared in a string of supporting roles in films, such as Woody Allen's Match Point (2005), the romantic comedy Imagine Me and You (2006), and the period drama Copying Beethoven (2006). He earned praise for his performances as Charles Ryder in the 2008 film adaptation of the novel Brideshead Revisited and as Ozymandias in the superhero film Watchmen (2009). He then starred in the romantic comedy Leap Year (2010) and the Australian drama Burning Man (2011), the latter earning him nominations for Best Actor at both the Film Critics Circle of Australia Awards and the AACTA Awards.

His other film roles include The Lookout (2007), A Single Man (2009), Cemetery Junction (2010), Stoker (2013), Belle (2013), The Imitation Game (2014) and Self/less (2015). Goode has also appeared in television series, including as Henry Talbot in the historical drama Downton Abbey, Finley "Finn" Polmar in the legal drama The Good Wife and a music journalist in the drama Dancing on the Edge. In 2017, Goode portrayed Antony Armstrong-Jones, 1st Earl of Snowdon in the second season of the biographical drama series The Crown, for which he received a Primetime Emmy Award nomination for Outstanding Guest Actor in a Drama Series. From 2018–2022, Goode starred as Matthew Clairmont in the fantasy romance series, A Discovery of Witches. In 2022, he starred as famed Paramount studio head Robert Evans in The Offer, a miniseries about the making of the classic 1972 gangster film The Godfather.

== Early life and education ==
Goode was born on 3 April 1978 in Exeter, Devon. His father, Anthony was a geologist, and his mother, Jennifer, is a nurse and amateur theatre director. Goode is the youngest of five children, with a brother, two half-brothers and a half-sister, television presenter Sally Meen, from his mother's previous marriage. He grew up in the village of Clyst St. Mary, near Exeter. Goode was educated at Exeter School, an independent school in Exeter, Devon, followed by the University of Birmingham and London's Webber Douglas Academy of Dramatic Art.

== Career ==
Goode played Peter Lynley, the brother of Inspector Lynley in the BBC production Inspector Lynley Mysteries: A Suitable Vengeance and co-starred in the TV film Confessions of an Ugly Stepsister, based on the Gregory Maguire novel of the same name and William Shakespeare's play The Tempest. In 2004, Goode made his American film debut opposite Mandy Moore in the romantic comedy Chasing Liberty.

Goode co-starred in Woody Allen's thriller Match Point, opposite Jonathan Rhys Meyers and Scarlett Johansson, Ol Parker's romantic comedy Imagine Me & You, opposite Piper Perabo and Lena Headey, the TV film My Family and Other Animals, opposite Imelda Staunton, the biographical-musical drama Copying Beethoven, opposite Ed Harris and Diane Kruger and Scott Frank's crime drama The Lookout opposite Joseph Gordon-Levitt. He had a whimsical take on Brooke Burgess in the BBC miniseries He Knew He Was Right based upon Anthony Trollope's novel of the same name.

In 2008, Goode starred as Charles Ryder in the drama film Brideshead Revisited, based on Evelyn Waugh's novel of the same name. In 2009, Goode co-starred in Zack Snyder's superhero film Watchmen as Ozymandias/Adrian Veidt, and co-starred opposite Colin Firth in the drama film A Single Man, based on Christopher Isherwood's novel of the same name. In 2010, he co-starred opposite Amy Adams in the romantic comedy Leap Year.

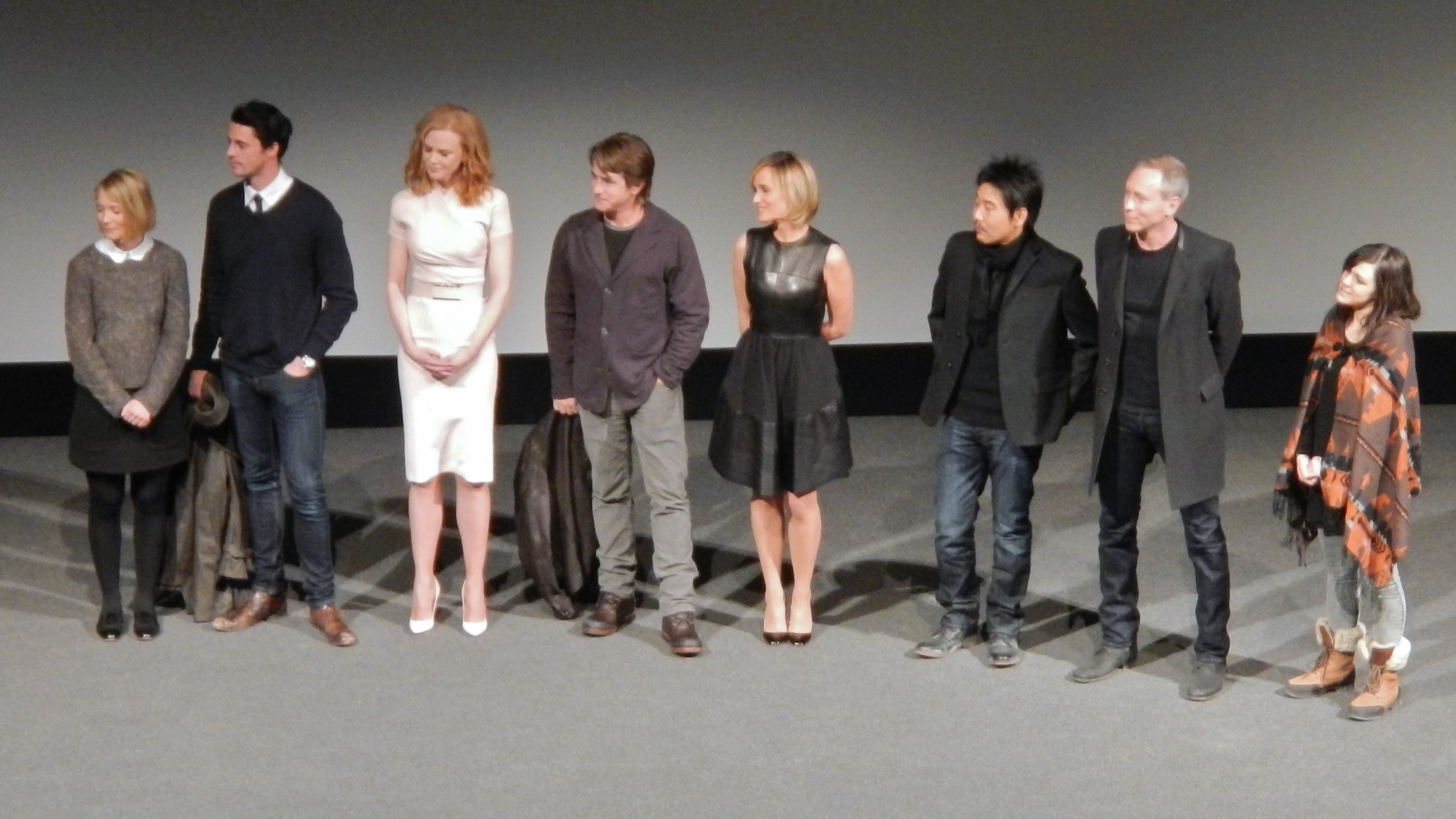
Goode with Stoker cast and crew at Sundance Film Festival

In 2013, Goode played music journalist Stanley Mitchell in the BBC Two drama Dancing on the Edge. That same year, he co-starred opposite Mia Wasikowska and Nicole Kidman in the psychological thriller film Stoker.

Also in 2013, Goode co-starred as George Wickham opposite Matthew Rhys in the three-part BBC murder mystery miniseries Death Comes to Pemberley, based on P. D. James' novel of the same name, a sequel to Jane Austen's Pride and Prejudice. In 2014, he appeared in the historical thriller The Imitation Game as Hugh Alexander, a British Second World War cryptanalyst and chess champion.

In March 2014, Goode joined the cast of the CBS legal drama The Good Wife as Finley "Finn" Polmar, a state prosecutor. Replacing Will Gardner during the fifth season, he made his debut in the 15th episode, "Dramatics, Your Honor". In May 2015, Goode left The Good Wife after the sixth season's finale.

In 2014, Goode co-starred in the ITV drama Downton Abbey during the Season 5 Christmas special "A Moorland Holiday" as Henry Talbot. He returned to Downton Abbey in October 2015 beginning in the fourth episode of the sixth season. Goode also made a brief appearance in the Downton Abbey film, which was released in 2019, though he did not appear in the subsequent sequels. His character was permanently written out of the franchise at the beginning of the third film.

After appearing in multiple films in the mid-2010s, he appeared in 2016's Allied. He began working on WGN's production of Roadside Picnic series based on the Strugatsky novel in autumn 2016, but the pilot was cancelled. That year, he presented ITV's The Wine Show with Joe Fattorini and Matthew Rhys.

In 2017, Goode began production on a television adaptation of Deborah Harkness's bestselling All Souls trilogy for Sky One in the United Kingdom. The show, titled A Discovery of Witches, takes its title from the series' first book. He plays the lead role of Professor Matthew Clairmont, an Oxford molecular biologist and vampire. The show was first broadcast in the UK on 14 September 2018, and has been renewed for two more series based on the strength of its first airing in the United Kingdom where it was consistently the network's most-watched show each week for its 8-episode run. Goode starred in the prequel to Matthew Vaughn's Kingsman series, entitled The King's Man, portraying Captain Morton / The Shepherd. Set in the 20th century, prefacing World War I, the film was released in December 2021.

== Personal life ==
Goode is married to Sophie Dymoke. They have three children: two daughters and a son. The family lives in Surrey.

== Filmography ==
=== Film ===
Year	Title	Role	Notes	Ref.
2003	Al sur de Granada (South of Granada)	Gerald Brenan		
2004	Chasing Liberty	Ben Calder		
2005	Match Point	Tom Hewett		
2006	Imagine Me & You	Hector		
2006	Copying Beethoven	Martin Bauer		
2007	The Lookout	Gary Spargo		
2008	Brideshead Revisited	Charles Ryder		
2009	Watchmen	Adrian Veidt / Ozymandias		
2009	A Single Man	Jim		
2010	Leap Year	Declan O'Callaghan		
2010	Cemetery Junction	Mike Ramsay		
2011	Burning Man	Tom		
2013	Stoker	Charlie Stoker		
2013	Belle	Captain Sir John Lindsay		
2014	The Imitation Game	Hugh Alexander		
2015	Pressure	Mitchell		
2015	Self/less	Dr. Jensen/Albright		
2016	Allied	Guy Sangster		
2017	The Sense of an Ending	Joe Hunt		
2017	The Hatton Garden Job	XXX		
2017	The Big Bad Fox and Other Tales...	Wolf (voice)	English dub	
2018	Birthmarked	Ben Morin		
2018	The Guernsey Literary and Potato Peel Pie Society	Sidney Stark		
2019	Official Secrets	Peter Beaumont		
2019	Downton Abbey	Henry Talbot		
2020	Four Kids and It	David Hartlepool		
2020	The Duke	Jeremy Hutchinson		
2021	Silent Night	Simon		
2021	The Colour Room	Colley Shorter	Released as a Sky Original film	
2021	The King's Man	Captain Morton / The Shepherd		
2022	The House	Raymond (voice)		
2022	Medieval	King Sigismund		
2023	Freud's Last Session	C. S. Lewis		
2024	Abigail	Father/Kristof Lazaar		
2026	Fortitude †	Thomas Argyll Robertson	Post-production	
TBA	The Custom of the Country †	TBA	Post-production	

=== Television ===
Year	Title	Role	Notes	Ref.
2002	Confessions of an Ugly Stepsister	Caspar	Television film	
2003	Bounty Hamster	Various		
2003	The Inspector Lynley Mysteries	Peter Lynley	Episode: "A Suitable Vengeance"	
2004	He Knew He Was Right	Brooke Burgess	2 episodes	
2005	Agatha Christie's Marple	Patrick Simmons	Episode: "A Murder Is Announced"	
2005	My Family and Other Animals	Larry Durrell	Television film	
2012	Birdsong	Captain Gray	Lead role, 2 episodes	
2012	The Poison Tree	Rex Clarke	Lead role, 2 episodes	
2013	Dancing on the Edge	Stanley Mitchell	Lead role, 6 episodes	
2013	Death Comes to Pemberley	George Wickham	Lead role, 3 episodes	
2013	The Vatican	Bernd Koch	Television film	
2014–2015	The Good Wife	Finley "Finn" Polmar	Main role (Seasons 5–6), 28 episodes	
2014–2015	Downton Abbey	Henry Talbot	Guest role (Season 5), Main role (Season 6), 7 episodes	
2016	The Wine Show	Himself	Co-host with Matthew Rhys	
2016	Roots	Dr. William Waller	Lead role, 2 episodes	
2017	The Crown	Antony Armstrong-Jones, 1st Earl of Snowdon	Main role (Season 2); 3 episodes	
2018	Ordeal by Innocence	Philip Durrant	Lead role, 3 episodes	
2018–2022	A Discovery of Witches	Matthew de Clairmont	Lead role, 25 episodes	
2022	The Offer	Robert Evans	Miniseries	
2025	Dept. Q	Carl Morck	Lead role, 9 episodes	

== Awards ==
Year	Award	Category	Work	Result	Ref.
2004	Teen Choice Awards	Choice Movie: Male Breakout Star	Chasing Liberty	Nominated	
2004	Teen Choice Awards	Choice Movie Liar	Chasing Liberty	Nominated	
2012	Film Critics Circle of Australia Awards	Best Actor	Burning Man	Nominated	
2013	Australian Film Critics Association	Best Actor	Burning Man	Nominated	
2013	Australian Film Institute	Best Actor	Burning Man	Nominated	
2014	Fangoria Chainsaw Awards	Best Supporting Actor	Stoker	Won	
2014	Satellite Awards	Best Actor – Miniseries or Television Film	Dancing on the Edge	Nominated	
2014	San Diego Film Critics Society	Best Performance by an Ensemble	The Imitation Game	Nominated	
2015	Palm Springs International Film Festival	Ensemble Cast Award	The Imitation Game	Won	
2015	Screen Actors Guild Awards	Outstanding Performance by a Cast in a Motion Picture	The Imitation Game	Nominated	
2017	Screen Actors Guild Awards	Outstanding Performance by an Ensemble in a Drama Series	Downton Abbey	Nominated	
2018	Primetime Emmy Awards	Outstanding Guest Actor in a Drama Series	The Crown	Nominated	
2023	Critics' Choice Awards	Best Supporting Actor in a Movie/Miniseries	The Offer	Nominated	
