= Death Comes to Pemberley =

2011 novel by P. D. James

Death Comes to Pemberley (novel)
- First edition (UK)
- Author: P. D. James
- Illustrator: Carol Devine Carson and Jason Booher
- Cover artist: Science Museum, SSPL
- Language: English
- Genre: Historical mystery
- Publisher: Alfred A. Knopf (US edition); Faber & Faber (UK edition)
- Publication date: 2011
- Publication place: United Kingdom
- Media type: Print (Hardcover, audiobook and Paperback)
- Pages: 291
- ISBN: 9780307959850 (US Hardcover)
- OCLC: 757488817
- Preceded by: Pride and Prejudice by Jane Austen

Death Comes to Pemberley is a 2011 historical mystery novel by British writer P. D. James that continues the story of Jane Austen's 1813 novel Pride and Prejudice and adds a murder mystery. In the book, Captain Denny, a minor character from Pride and Prejudice, is murdered at Fitzwilliam Darcy's Pemberley estate, and George Wickham stands trial for murder. A three-part television drama, of the same name, was made by BBC One in 2013.

== Overview ==
The novel is a pastiche in the style of Jane Austen, as James acknowledges in her Author's Note. The book is divided into sections: Author's Note, Prologue, six Books, Epilogue. The Prologue and Book One introduce the main characters, summarize the histories of the Bennet and Darcy families, and introduce a murder. The remainder of the novel is about the mystery and its solution. Elizabeth Bennet is largely absent in the central section. Unlike Pride and Prejudice, the story is told from Darcy's point of view, and therefore it contains his inward reflections, which are absent in Austen's novel.

== Plot summary ==
The novel begins in October 1803, six years after the events in Pride and Prejudice, which ended with the marriage of Darcy and Elizabeth.

George Wickham and his friend Captain Martin Denny, with Wickham's young wife Lydia (née Bennet), in a horse drawn chaise, are passing through a wooded area on the grounds of Pemberley in Derbyshire. Denny shouts to the driver to stop, and gets out. He runs into the woods, followed by Wickham, trying to stop him. Distraught, Lydia demands to be driven up to the house. The coachman, hearing shots, raises the alarm and Darcy and his cousin Colonel Fitzwilliam, Viscount Hartlep, hurry to the wood minutes later. They discover Denny, a bloodstained corpse. Despite the shots, Denny had received the mortal blows from a blunt instrument. Wickham, still not sober, is beside him, and is heard to say that the death of Denny is his fault.

Later in court, Wickham says that Denny "thought that I had been wrong to resign my commission without having a sound profession and a settled home for my wife. In addition he thought that my plan to leave Mrs Wickham at Pemberley to spend the night there and to attend the ball the next day was both inconsiderate and would be inconvenient for Mrs Darcy. I believe that it was his increasing impatience with my conduct that made my company intolerable to him, and that it was this reason that led him to stop the chaise and run into the woodland."

The publican's wife at the inn from which the three travellers had set out said that she heard Denny say that "Mr Wickham was selfish and did not understand how women feel and that there had been deceit from start to finish."

The coachman heard Denny say he would not go along with Mr Wickham any more, and that Mr Wickham was now on his own.

There is much about police and judicial procedures. Darcy, although he is a magistrate, stands aside in various ways from the investigation of a death on his land.

In his defence Wickham tells the jury that he had come upon Denny lying dead, and fired with Denny's weapon at a figure he thought he saw retreating through the woods. Then, like a deus ex machina, a written deposition arrives from a sick man, William Bidwell, who has one week to live. He left his sickbed, seized a poker, and struck Denny, whom he took for the soldier who had interfered with his sister Louisa. After he knocked him down he saw him fall backwards, striking his head fatally on a stone. The deposition arrives after the jury has returned a verdict of guilty. Wickham receives a royal pardon.

In the sixth and final section, the backstory is told, after we have been given the outcome of the trial. Wickham had fathered an illegitimate child by Louisa Bidwell. Colonel Fitzwilliam, who owed Wickham a favour from the Irish campaign, agreed to lend or give him £30 so that Mrs Younge, once a companion to Darcy's younger sister, could bring up the boy. She, however, is run over and killed outside the high court where Wickham has been tried, and it was expected that Louisa's married sister in Birmingham would adopt the child. Louisa, however, has only lately discovered that the father of her love child, Georgie, is in fact Wickham. It is arranged that Georgie be adopted by Mr and Mrs Robert Martin (brought in from Emma: Mrs Martin had been Harriet Smith before her marriage). They arrange his baptism, and give him the name of John. Louisa later marries Joseph Billings, butler at Highmarten, the home of Jane, née Bennet, and Charles Bingley, and intends that the boy will not in the future be found by Wickham, who will now emigrate to America with Lydia, financed once again by the benevolence of Darcy.

== Reviews ==
Newspaper reviews were generally favourable, many enthusiastically so, with the New York Times foremost in the United States.

== Adaptation ==
A serial of three sixty-minute episodes, also titled Death Comes to Pemberley, written by Juliette Towhidi (Calendar Girls) was made by Origin Pictures for BBC One. It was broadcast in the UK over three nights from 26 December 2013 as part of BBC's Christmas schedule, and stars Anna Maxwell Martin as Elizabeth, Matthew Rhys as Mr Darcy, Jenna Coleman as Lydia, Matthew Goode as Mr Wickham and Trevor Eve as Sir Selwyn Hardcastle.

Death Comes to Pemberley was adapted as a stage show and premiered at the Yvonne Arnaud theatre in Guildford on 13 August 2025.
