= Joe Fattorini =

UK wine expert and presenter

Joe Fattorini (born 5 September 1969) is a British radio and television presenter and wine expert.

== Journalism ==
Fattorini wrote a weekly wine column for The Herald for over fourteen years. He has also contributed to Harpers Wine & Spirit, The Independent, and The Buyer.

== Television and radio ==
Fattorini has presented a number of radio and television programmes for the BBC, including Joe's Diner and It's Your Money.

In 2016, Fattorini presented ITV's The Wine Show with Matthew Goode and Matthew Rhys. Stephen Heritage of The Guardian praised Fattorini as 'a revelation, arguably the Attenborough of Oddbins.'

== Awards ==
- IWC Personality of the Year Award 2017
- IWSC Wine Communicator of the Year Award 2017
