= Mr. Darcy =

Literary character

- Pride and Prejudice character
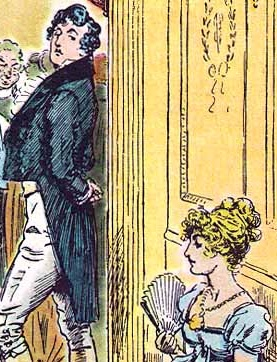
- Mr. Darcy and Elizabeth Bennet by C. E. Brock (1895) "She is tolerable, but not handsome enough to tempt me."
- Portrayed by: Colin Firth and others, see below

In-universe information
- Full name: Fitzwilliam Darcy
- Gender: Male
- Occupation: Member of the gentry; landowner and farmer
- Spouse: Elizabeth Bennet
- Relatives: Unknown Lord (maternal grandfather); Mr. Darcy Sr. (father; deceased); Lady Anne Fitzwilliam (mother; deceased); Georgiana Darcy (sister); Colonel Fitzwilliam (first cousin); Lady Catherine de Bourgh (maternal aunt); Anne de Bourgh (first cousin); Mr. Bingley (brother-in-law); George Wickham (brother-in-law); Mr Bennet (father-in-law); Mrs Bennet (mother-in-law); Jane Bennet (sister-in-law); Mary Bennet (sister-in-law); Catherine "Kitty" Bennet (sister-in-law); Lydia Bennet (sister-in-law)
- Religion: Church of England
- Home: Pemberley, near Lambton, Derbyshire
- Nationality: English

Fitzwilliam Darcy Esquire, generally referred to as Mr. Darcy, is one of the two central characters in Jane Austen's 1813 novel Pride and Prejudice. He is an archetype of the aloof romantic hero, and a romantic interest of Elizabeth Bennet, the novel's protagonist. Brooding, reserved, and magnetic, Darcy initially deeply offends and vexes Elizabeth, but their paths diverge and his character deepens as the two grow closer and mend their differences. Usually referred to only as "Mr. Darcy" or "Darcy" by characters and the narrator, his first name is mentioned twice in the novel. Mr. Darcy has been portrayed in film by Colin Firth, Matthew Macfadyen, and Laurence Olivier.

== Character ==
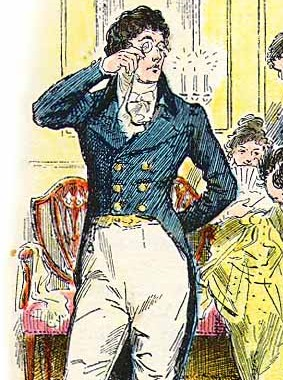
Mr. Darcy by C. E. Brock, 1895

Mr. Darcy is a wealthy, tall, and handsome young gentleman with an income exceeding £10,000 a year (equivalent to £855,000 in 2024). The Darcy family have long owned Pemberley, a large estate in Derbyshire, England. As the head of the family and single, Mr Darcy is a highly attractive marital prospect; but is widely expected to marry his first cousin, Anne de Bourgh. He is also being pursued by Caroline Bingley, the sister of his close friend, Charles Bingley.

Darcy first meets Elizabeth Bennet at a ball, where he makes rather demeaning remarks about her while she is within earshot. As Mr. Bingley becomes interested in Elizabeth's sister Jane, Darcy continues to interact with Elizabeth and feels drawn to her despite their differences and banter, and is unaware of her confused perception of him. Mr. Wickham, Darcy's childhood friend and now enemy, influences Elizabeth against Darcy by accusing him of betrayal. Darcy and Elizabeth's relationship builds until Darcy declares his love for her and proposes marriage.

Eventually, Mr. Darcy declares his love for Elizabeth and asks for her hand; but in the very course of proposing, he reminds her of the large gap in their social status, insults her family, and is unaware of her negative image of him. Elizabeth is offended and vehemently refuses him, expressing her reasons for disliking him, including her knowledge of his interference with Jane and Bingley and the account she received from Mr. Wickham of Darcy's alleged unfair treatment toward him. Insulted by Darcy's arrogant retorts, Elizabeth says that the rudeness in his proposal prevented her from feeling concerns for him she "might have felt had you behaved in a more gentlemanlike manner". Darcy departs in anger and mortification; the next morning, he writes and hand delivers a letter to Elizabeth in which he defends his wounded honour, reveals the motives for his interference in Jane and Bingley's relationship, and gives a full account of his dealings with Wickham, who had attempted to seduce and elope with Darcy's younger sister, Georgiana, the previous summer.

Although initially angered by Elizabeth's vehement refusal and harsh criticism, Darcy is shocked to discover the reality of how his behaviour is perceived by others, particularly Elizabeth, and commits himself to re-evaluate his actions. A few months later, Darcy unexpectedly encounters Elizabeth when she is visiting his estate in Derbyshire with her aunt and uncle. Elizabeth is surprised to discover a marked change in Darcy's manner. Having responded to Elizabeth's criticism, Darcy is now determined to display the "gentlemanlike manner" she accused him of lacking and astonishes her with his kindness towards both her and her relations. She is impressed with his patronage of the arts, relationship with his sister, dynamics with his house staff, and beautiful garden.

On discovering that Elizabeth's youngest sister Lydia has fallen prey to and run off with Mr. Wickham, Darcy tracks them down and induces Wickham to marry Lydia, saving both Lydia and her family from social disgrace and assuaging his own guilt for not preventing Wickham's actions. Despite having to pay upwards of ten thousand pounds, Darcy's intervention was done secretly and he did not want anyone to know. After learning of this selflessness, Elizabeth realises she is in love with Darcy. He has relinquished his pride, and she, her prejudice. Bingley returns to Longbourn and becomes engaged to Jane, admitting his misjudgment of her character. Darcy proposes to Elizabeth again, who happily accepts his proposal.

== Depictions in film and television ==
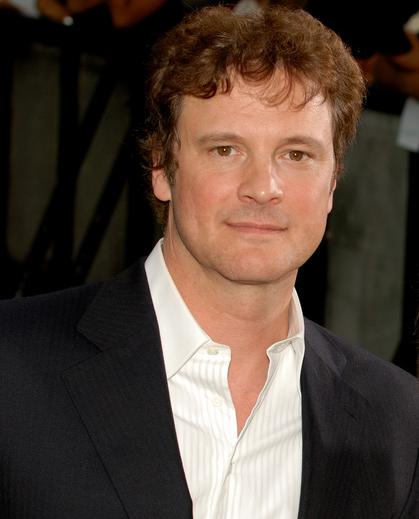
Colin Firth’s portrayal of Darcy in Pride and Prejudice (1995) is regarded as among the finest interpretations of the character. He later portrayed the derived character, named Mark Darcy, in Bridget Jones's Diary in 2001.

=== Film ===
Year	Actor	Role	Film	Notes
1940	Laurence Olivier	Fitzwilliam Darcy	Pride and Prejudice	
2001	Colin Firth	Mark Darcy	Bridget Jones's Diary	An adaptation of the novel Bridget Jones's Diary by Helen Fielding. Fielding's novel is loosely based on the novel Pride and Prejudice, the 1995 BBC TV series, and Colin Firth's portrayal of Fitzwilliam Darcy.
2003	Orlando Seale	Will Darcy	Pride & Prejudice: A Latter-Day Comedy	A Modern adaptation of Pride and Prejudice.
2004	Martin Henderson	William "Will" Darcy	Bride and Prejudice	A Bollywood adaptation of Pride and Prejudice.
2004	Colin Firth	Mark Darcy	Bridget Jones: The Edge of Reason	An adaptation of the novel The Edge of Reason by Helen Fielding and a sequel to Bridget Jones's Diary.
2005	Matthew Macfadyen	Fitzwilliam Darcy	Pride & Prejudice	A Joe Wright adaptation of Pride & Prejudice.
2016	Sam Riley	Colonel Fitzwilliam Darcy	Pride and Prejudice and Zombies	Based on the parody novel by Seth Grahame-Smith.
2016	Colin Firth	Mark Darcy	Bridget Jones's Baby	a sequel to 2004's Bridget Jones: The Edge of Reason, based on an adaptation of the novel Bridget Jones's Diary by Helen Fielding.
2022	Conrad Ricamora	Will	Fire Island	A queer romantic comedy retelling of Pride and Prejudice set in New York's Fire Island Pines.
2025	Colin Firth	Mark Darcy	Bridget Jones: Mad About The Boy	The last movie adaptation of Helen Fielding's final novel in the Bridget Jones's Diary series.

=== Television ===
Year	Actor	Role	Television program	Notes
1938	Andrew Orborn	Fitzwilliam Darcy	Pride and Prejudice	Performance broadcast live.
1949	John Baragrey	Fitzwilliam Darcy	The Philco Television Playhouse	Season 1, Episode 17 – "Pride and Prejudice"
1952	Peter Cushing	Fitzwilliam Darcy	Pride and Prejudice	
1957	Franco Volpi	Signor Darcy	Orgoglio e pregiudizio	Italian adaptation
1958	Alan Badel	Fitzwilliam Darcy	Pride and Prejudice	
1958	Patrick Macnee	Mr. Darcy	General Motors Theatre	Episode – "Pride and Prejudice" (Originally aired on 21 December).
1967	Lewis Fiander	Fitzwilliam Darcy	Pride and Prejudice	
1980	David Rintoul	Fitzwilliam Darcy	Pride and Prejudice	
1995	Colin Firth	Fitzwilliam Darcy	Pride and Prejudice	Through his loyal depiction, Colin Firth's adaptation is widely known as the best portrayal of Darcy. The acting is largely beloved and remembered as one of the best performances of the classic romantic hero. In addition, Colin Firth portrayed the character of Mark Darcy in all three film adaptations of Fielding's novels. The adaptation and Colin Firth's portrayal of Fitzwilliam Darcy inspired Helen Fielding to write Bridget Jones's Diary and The Edge of Reason.
1995	Soccer/Larry Brantley	Mr. Darcy	Wishbone	Season 1, Episode 25 – "Furst Impressions"
2008	Elliot Cowan	Fitzwilliam Darcy	Lost in Austen	A fantasy adaptation of Pride and Prejudice in which a modern woman trades places with Elizabeth Bennet.
2012–2013	Daniel Vincent Gordh	William Darcy	The Lizzie Bennet Diaries	A modern adaptation where the main character Lizzie tells the story of Pride and Prejudice through video blog format.
2013	Matthew Rhys	Fitzwilliam Darcy	Death Comes to Pemberley	A continuation based on P.D. James' book with the same name.
2013	Dallas Sauer	Mr. Darcy	Once Upon a Time in Wonderland	A brief appearance in the episode "Who's Alice" as a potential suitor for Alice.
2016	Ryan Paevey	Donovan Darcy	Unleashing Mr. Darcy	Television film.
2018	Thiago Lacerda	Darcy Williamson	Orgulho e Paixão	A telenovela based Jane Austen's works.
2018	Ryan Paevey	Donovan Darcy	Marrying Mr. Darcy	Television film.
TBA	Jack Lowden	Fitzwilliam Darcy	Pride and Prejudice	A Netflix adaptation of the novel
2026	Victor Pilard	Fitzwilliam Darcy	The Other Bennet Sister	A television adaptation

=== Audio ===
Year	Actor	Role	Television programme	Notes
2025	Harris Dickinson	Mr. Darcy	Pride and Prejudice	An adaptation on Audible

== Analysis ==
Mr. Darcy is a proud and arrogant man, particularly to those that he considers of lower social status. It is suggested that he is a member of the old Anglo-Norman aristocracy, as indicated by his own name as well as that of his aunt, Lady Catherine de Bourgh. At the dance, he does not dance with any ladies outside his own party because he believes them to be beneath him in class and beauty. He does, however, mention later on to Elizabeth that he does not find it easy to make new acquaintances and finds it hard to converse with people he does not know. This shows a sort of shy, perhaps even reclusive nature in Darcy that is not illustrated before this point in the book. After receiving Mr. Darcy's letter of explanation, Elizabeth notes: that she has never "seen anything that betrayed him to be unprincipled or unjust—anything that spoke him of irreligious or immoral habits; that among his own connections he was esteemed and valued". For example, his behaviour with Bingley is more than brotherly as he rescues him from what he believed was a bad marriage and is a constant companion at his side. Through Elizabeth, he learns to be less boastful and arrogant because he realizes that his actions have deeply affected others. This arrogance is seen in his first proposal to Elizabeth whereby he acts with more pride rather than in a loving manner. Despite the way in which Elizabeth often mocks him, she is surprised by his "gallantry" as he persists in pursuing her.

Vivien Jones notes that Darcy's handsome appearance, wealth and original arrogance signify to the reader that he is the hero of a romance novel. Wickham's irresponsible elopement with Lydia allows Darcy to demonstrate that he now feels responsible for Wickham's continued bad behaviour by his silence – if he had made Wickham's bad character known, Lydia would have been safe. Darcy chooses to involve himself in arranging Lydia's marriage, risking his own reputation. Elizabeth dismisses him at first as "intricate", though she adds that "intricate" men are at least "amusing". Though Darcy treats Elizabeth with contempt, he always finds her to be "uncommonly intelligent by the beautiful expression of her dark eyes" and is "caught by the easy playfulness of her manner". At one point, Elizabeth notes that "Mr. Darcy is all politeness" and speaks of his "grave propriety". The term "grave propriety" is meant ironically, noting that Darcy is polite, but only in the sense that he possesses the mere civility of "the proudest, most disagreeable man in the world". However, despite his barely tactful behaviour, it is implied he has deeper feelings of affection for Elizabeth, which he has difficulty in expressing and which she often does not notice.

The 18th century had been a time of a "Cult of Courtesy", a time that prized delicacy, refinement and exaggerated politeness above all, leading in the words of the British writer Adam Nicolson to a situation where "wide swathes of English 18th century life become fragile and dainty, in a way that no age in England, before or since, has managed. ... In some ways, natural human dignity had been sacrificed on the altar of a kind of rococo politeness. ... Acceptable behaviour had become toy-like and it was not long before the anti-heroic fashion for a delicate sensibility ran out of control. Manliness, or even the ability to survive had in fact almost entirely deserted those [who] were suffering from the cult of sensibility". In the 18th-century idea, a man was expected above all to be pleasant and pleasing, and so it was better for a man to lie rather than say anything which might offend. By the early 19th century, a tougher, more brooding version of masculinity was starting to come into vogue and the character of Mr. Darcy exemplifies the trend. Nicolson described the differences between Mr. Bingley and Mr. Darcy as follows: "Mr. Bingley is a[n] 18th century man: handsome, young, agreeable, delightful, fond of dancing, gentlemanlike, pleasant, easy, unaffected and not entirely in control of his own destiny. Darcy is fine, tall, handsome, noble, proud, forbidding, disagreeable and subject to no control but his own. ... Darcy is a 19th-century man, manliness itself, uncompromising, dark and sexy. And it is Darcy, of course, whom the novel ends up loving".

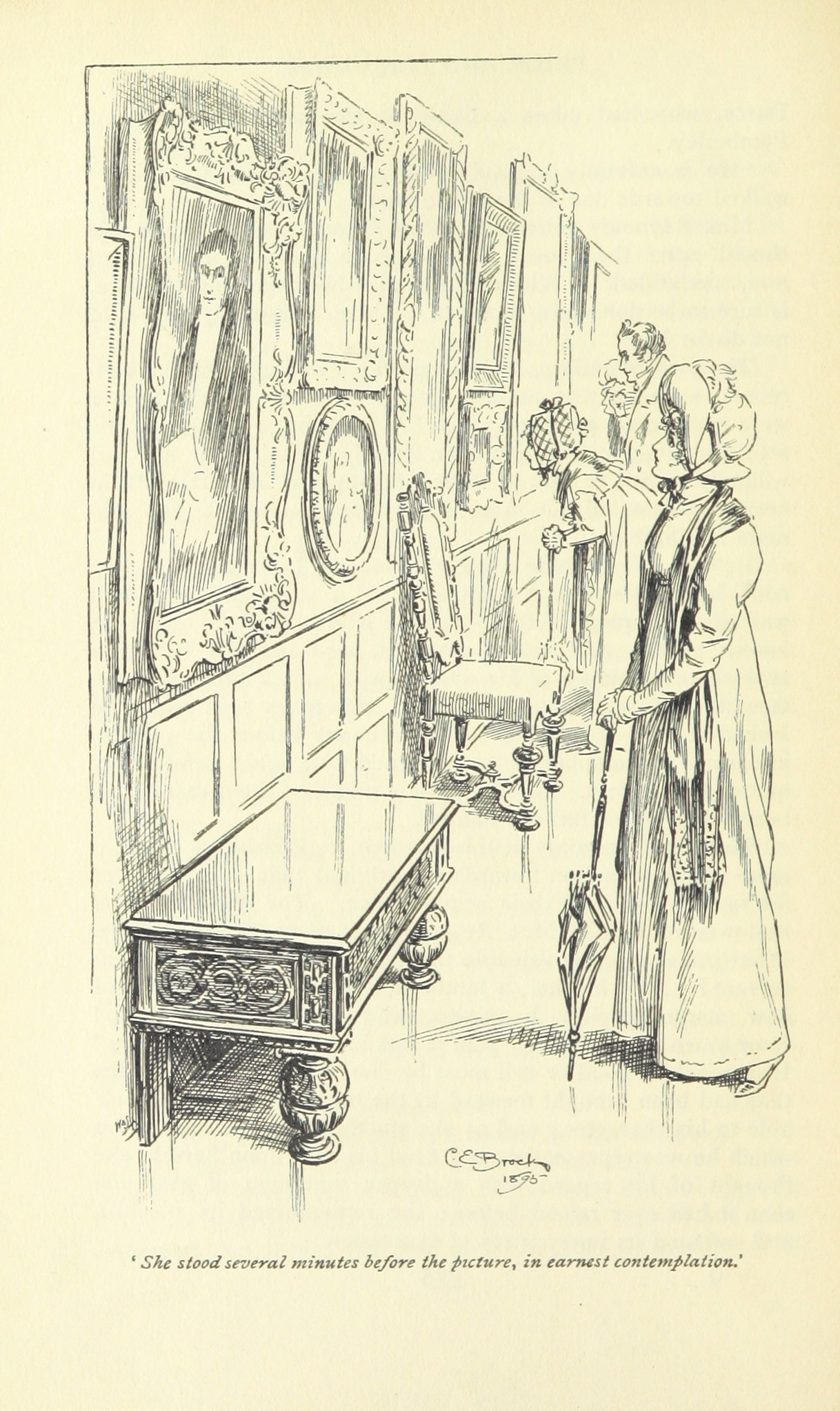
Elizabeth admires Darcy’s portrait, seeing him now in a different light.

The character of Mr. Darcy very much reflects the changing standards of English masculinity as, unlike the heroes of the 18th century with their excessive politeness and unwillingness to offend, Mr. Darcy says whatever he likes, which shows his authenticity and honesty, which were the most important attributes for a man in the new Romantic age. Even after Mr. Darcy apologises to Miss Bennet for his brusque rudeness, his honesty means that the change of heart is sincere, and not the polished words of a follower of the cult of sensibility. More broadly, the character of Mr. Darcy showed the emergence of a new type of rawer masculinity that could not tolerate the foppish, superficial values of the previous century. Nicolson called Darcy "the template on which the severe and unbending model of Victorian manliness is founded". Nicolson concluded that: "The implication of the novel is that there is something better than politeness and that the merely civil is inadequate. ... Darcy is 'silent, grave and indifferent', words in this new moral universe which signal pure approval". At one point, Darcy states "disguise of every sort is my abhorrence" reflecting the fact he never pretends to be anything other than what he is. When the lightweight and pretentious Miss Bingley lists all the attributes of "an accomplished woman", Darcy says "To all this she must yet add something more substantial, in the improvement of her mind by extensive reading", indicating he wants more from a woman than what Miss Bingley thinks is necessary.

Nicolson further argued that a character like Mr. Darcy reflects changes in British life as the Romantic age was a time when "What mattered was authentic, self-generated worth". In this regard, the novel says "Of this she was perfectly unaware; to her he was only the man who made himself agreeable nowhere, and who had not thought her handsome enough to dance with". Darcy is attracted to Elizabeth early on, but he sees her as unfit socially as a wife; however his feelings for her are such that he decides to forgo convention to marry the woman he loves, fitting him into the mould of a Romantic hero. After Darcy gets over his prejudices against marrying the middle-class Elizabeth, the scholar Bernard Paris wrote that Darcy "becomes the most romantic figure in the book" while at the same time upholding traditional British values as "he uses his great power in the service of both order and desire". Darcy is equally opposed to the "anarchistic tendencies" of Wickham on one hand and the "tyranny" of Lady Catherine on the other. The scholar Alison Sulloway noted that Darcy has little patience for polite society with its false courtesies and superficial talk, and much prefers to be running Pemberley or to be outdoors. Darcy's heroic stance is shown by the way he pursues Elizabeth despite her rejection of his first offer of marriage, showing the depth of his feelings that he often has trouble expressing properly. Even though Darcy is sometimes clumsy at expressing his love for Elizabeth, his tendency to speak only what he really feels stands in marked contrast to the polished words of Wickham who never means what he says. The scholar Josephine Ross wrote that the picture today of Darcy as asexual says more about the standards of our time rather than of the Romantic era, noting when Elizabeth tells him that Wickham has seduced her sister Lydia, he can only "observe her in compassionate silence"; despite clearly wanting to touch Elizabeth he does not as that would not be proper for a gentleman. Ross wrote: "Had he taken her in his arms and covered her with kisses, the atmosphere of that critical scene could not have been more thrillingly charged".

In the Romantic age, those who prefer the "authentic" world of the outdoors are usually seen as the more sincere and passionate in their emotions, and in this sense, Darcy's preference for being in his garden at Pemberley or otherwise on the grounds of the estate shows him as a Romantic hero. The very fact that Elizabeth is impressed by the beauty of Pemberley's gardens, hills, forests, fields, valleys, streams and pastures, which show Darcy's commitment to appreciating the beauty of nature, further underlines the point. Like all of Jane Austen's heroes, Darcy wore the standard dress of a Regency gentleman, described as a darkly coloured, double-collared coat over a waistcoat together with breeches and riding boots in the day and a darkly coloured tailcoat, light breeches or dark trousers in the evening. In the 18th century, it was normal for spouses to address each other by their surnames, and Elizabeth Bennet's parents, for example, address each other as Mr. Bennet and Mrs. Bennet despite having been married for 20 years; by contrast after his engagement, Darcy for the first time calls his fiancée Elizabeth, which shows the depth of his love. A sign that this is a marriage based on love is the fact that Darcy is described as having an annual income of 10,000 pounds, yet Elizabeth refuses to marry him until she finally decides she loves him.

The British cultural critic Robert Irvine described the appeal of Mr. Darcy to women as that of an "absolute and unconditioned male need for a woman". Irvine argued that this was a female "fantasy" that was only possible in a context of general powerlessness on the part of women. At the time of the French Revolution when elites all over Europe felt threatened, there was a tendency in British literature to glorify the aristocratic and gentry classes as the personification of British values in contrast to the French who guillotined their old elite to create the grasping, vulgar new elite of Napoleonic France. For the British middle class or "middling sort" as Austen called them, to emulate the landed elite, however, retained its social superiority. The character of Mr. Darcy reflects this trend. When Mr. Bingley suggests that he might like to one day build an estate like Pemberley, he is informed by Mr. Darcy that it is not the estate itself, but rather what it contains, its cultural heritage like the family library that makes Pemberley special. Mr. Bingley cannot be the heir to a family library built up over generations like the one Mr. Darcy is the heir to. In this way, Austen suggests that there is more to Mr. Darcy than the proud and sneering man at the Meryton assembly, that there is a deepness to him as people like him are custodians of the national culture. The scholar C. C. Barfoot described Pemberley as the "marvelous accretion of all the choices made by his predecessors", providing as the novel calls it "a kind of model" for how to live properly. Barfoot argued that for Austen "civilization is not a gift, but is a possession that needs to be earned and sustained by practice"; in this regard, the fact that Darcy takes good care of his estate shows his basically civilised nature which he hides under his veneer of snobbery and coldness.

A sign of the depth of Darcy's love for Elizabeth can be seen in that he tracks down Lydia and Wickham despite all of the costs. The scholar James Brown observed that at the time transport via the mud roads of Britain was hugely expensive, citing the remark by the novelist Sir Walter Scott that it had cost him 50 pounds to travel from Edinburgh to London in 1828; in today's money the sum was equal to 2,500 pounds. Brown wrote that the readers in Austen's time would have known it had been an expensive burden for Darcy to go off searching for Wickham and Lydia, and readers today almost miss the significance of Darcy's financial sacrifice caused by his love for Elizabeth. However, Brown wrote that Scott himself had admitted that he insisted on travelling in style on his trip, staying at the most expensive hotels and eating at the most expensive restaurants as befitting a gentleman of means, and that not all travellers at the time would have stayed and eaten at the same sort of establishments patronised by Scott.

Irvine argued that for someone like Darcy to live about half of the year in London, which is a glittering and far-away place for people of Meryton, proves his social superiority as his "London manners" are described variously in the novel as "fashionable" and "elegant". Irvine argued that the union of Elizabeth and Darcy at the end of the novel was meant by Austen as a symbol of the union of the national and regional elites in England, forging together a united nation. One scholar, Rachel Brownstein, noted that of all the Austen romances, that of Darcy and Elizabeth is the only one where the couple began as complete strangers at the beginning of the book, making Pride and Prejudice the most romantic of the Austen novels.

Irvine argued that Elizabeth appears to be unworthy of Darcy not because of their differences in income level, but because of the class divide as she contemplates the glories of Pemberley. Against the interpretation that Pride and Prejudice is primarily a novel about class, the American scholar Susan Morgan argued the novel is about character, stating Mr. Wickham may not be as wealthy as Darcy, but his commission in the militia would have made him an eminently respectable man to marry in Regency England. Morgan wrote that though Darcy is rich, he does not represent "society" as some would have done, because he is reserved, vain, and quasi-isolated from society. Morgan argued that Austen's message in Pride and Prejudice is that one should marry for love rather than money as Wickham disqualifies himself as a potential groom owing to his bad character, not his income. Morgan observed that for most of the novel Darcy loves Elizabeth even when she loathes him and also when she comes to return his feelings. Austen writes that it was because of "a motive within her of goodwill which could not be overlooked. It was gratitude—Gratitude, not merely for having loved her once, but for loving her still well enough, to forgive all the petulance and acrimony of her manner in rejecting him, and all the unjust accusations accompanying her rejection". Morgan argued that the growth of Elizabeth's feelings for Darcy is a sign of her intellectual growth, as she comes to understand that freedom means the freedom to appreciate and understand the value of love. In this sense, Darcy, by seeking to improve himself, by ignoring repeated slights and insults, and by paying off Wickham's debts to rescue Lydia from her ill-conceived marriage just to impress her, proves himself worthy of Elizabeth's love. Morgan wrote that the gratitude that Austen meant for Elizabeth to feel for Darcy "is a gratitude that, despite all the obstacles which realism can provide, despite time, conventions, and misunderstanding, despite her wrongs and his own limitations, Mr. Darcy can see Elizabeth honestly and can love her as well." One critic, Wilbur Cross, wrote that at first Darcy displays outrageous arrogance to Elizabeth, but the novel ends with an "almost pitiable humiliation of Darcy", which was a testament to the power of women to tame men.

== Cultural influence and legacy ==
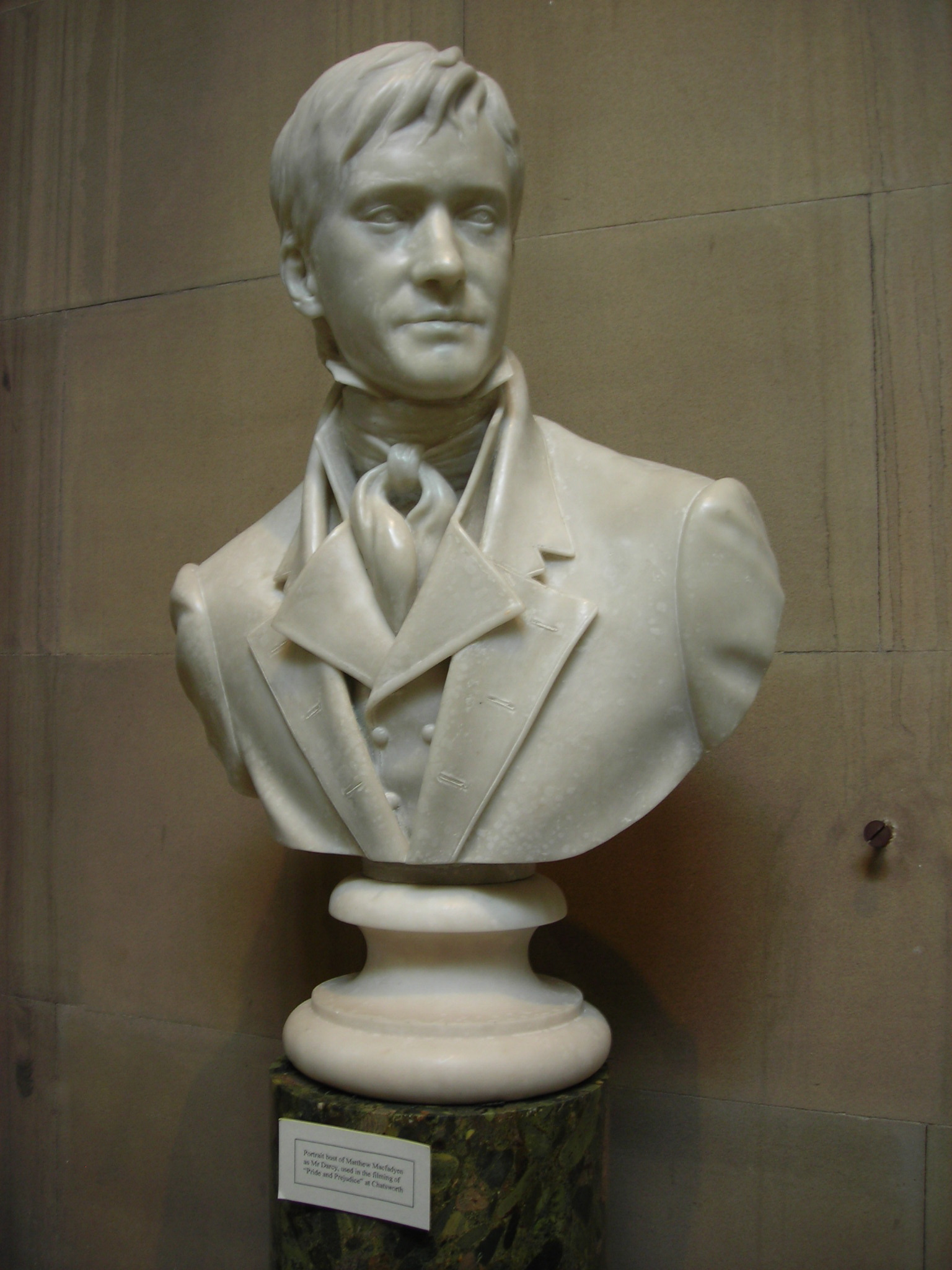
Bust of Mr. Darcy played by Matthew Macfadyen in the 2005 film adaption

The character of Fitzwilliam Darcy has appeared in and inspired numerous works. Both Mr. Darcy and Elizabeth Bennet feature as part of science fiction author Philip José Farmer's fictional 'Wold Newton family', which links numerous literary characters (such as Tarzan and Sherlock Holmes) via an interconnected family tree of people and events. According to Farmer's works, both were exposed to radiation from a meteorite that struck Wold Newton in Yorkshire in the 1790s (a documented event). This allowed them to be the ancestors of many other famous literary characters, some of whom possessed unusual or even superhuman gifts and abilities. Numerous re-imaginings of the original work written from the perspective of Mr. Darcy have also been published, among them American writer Pamela Aidan's Fitzwilliam Darcy, Gentleman trilogy, and English author Janet Aylmer's successful novel Darcy's Story published in the UK (ISBN 9780952821021) and later in the United States (ISBN 9780061148705).

Helen Fielding has admitted she "pillaged her plot" for Bridget Jones's Diary from Pride and Prejudice. In Bridget Jones's Diary and its sequel The Edge of Reason, Bridget Jones is constantly mentioning the 1995 BBC adaptation and repeatedly watches the scene in the fourth episode where Darcy (Colin Firth) emerges from a pond wearing a wet white shirt, and refers to the Darcy and Elizabeth of the TV series as "my chosen representatives in the field of shagging, or, rather, courtship". When in The Edge of Reason Bridget becomes a journalist, she is flown to Italy where she is to interview Firth about his (then upcoming) film Fever Pitch, but finds herself only asking him questions about Mr. Darcy and the filming of the "pond scene". This scene was shot but not included in the film adaptation of Bridget Jones: The Edge of Reason. This scene can be seen in the DVD's extra features. Colin Firth's "pond scene" made it into Channel 4's Top 100 TV Moments. Colin Firth has found it hard to shake off the Darcy image, and he thought that playing Bridget Jones's Mark Darcy, a character inspired by the other Darcy, would both ridicule and liberate him once and for all from the iconic character.

Darcy's status as a romantic hero transcends literature. In 2010 a protein sex pheromone in male mouse urine, that is sexually attractive to female mice, was named Darcin in honour of the character.

On 9 July 2013, a 12-foot (3.7 m) fibreglass statue of the figure of Mr. Darcy emerging from the water was installed in the Serpentine Lake of London's Hyde Park for a promotion of British television's UKTV channel. Modelled on actor Colin Firth, the statue made the rounds of several English lakes before its final installation in Lyme Park, a location where the programme was partly filmed and already a pilgrimage site for Pride and Prejudice fans.
