= Pride and Prejudice (1995 TV series) =

1995 British television drama series

- 1995 UK VHS cover showing Jennifer Ehle (Elizabeth Bennet) and Colin Firth (Mr. Darcy)
- Genre: Costume drama
- Based on: Pride and Prejudice by Jane Austen
- Screenplay by: Andrew Davies
- Directed by: Simon Langton
- Starring: Jennifer Ehle; Colin Firth
- Theme music composer: Carl Davis
- Country of origin: United Kingdom
- Original language: English
- No. of series: 1
- No. of episodes: 6

Production
- Producer: Sue Birtwistle
- Cinematography: John Kenway
- Running time: 327 minutes

Original release
- Network: BBC1
- Release: 24 September – 29 October 1995

Pride and Prejudice is a six-episode 1995 British television drama, adapted by Andrew Davies from Jane Austen's 1813 novel of the same name. Jennifer Ehle and Colin Firth starred as Elizabeth Bennet and Fitzwilliam Darcy, respectively. Produced by Sue Birtwistle and directed by Simon Langton, the serial was a BBC production with additional funding from the American A&E Network. BBC1 originally broadcast the 55-minute episodes from 24 September to 29 October 1995. In the United States, the A&E Network aired the series in double episodes on three consecutive nights beginning 14 January 1996.

Critically acclaimed and a popular success, Pride and Prejudice was honoured with several awards, including the BAFTA TV Award for Best Actress for Jennifer Ehle and the Primetime Emmy Award for Outstanding Individual Achievement in Costume Design for a Miniseries or a Special. The role of Mr. Darcy elevated Colin Firth to stardom. A scene showing Firth in a wet shirt was recognised as "one of the most unforgettable moments in British TV history". The New York Times called the adaptation "a witty mix of love stories and social conniving, cleverly wrapped in the ambitions and illusions of a provincial gentry". The series inspired author Helen Fielding to write the popular Bridget Jones novels, and their screen adaptations subsequently featured Firth as Bridget's love interest, Mark Darcy.

== Plot ==
=== Episode 1 ===
Mr. Charles Bingley, a wealthy gentleman from the north of England, settles down at the rented Netherfield estate near Meryton village in Hertfordshire for the autumn. Mrs. Bennet, unlike her husband, is excited at the prospect of marrying off one of her five daughters (Jane, Elizabeth, Mary, Kitty, and Lydia) to the newcomer. Mr. Bennet claims to have no intention of calling on Mr. Bingley; unless he does so, his wife and daughters will be unable to socialise with Mr. Bingley. Mrs. Bennet, perturbed by Mr. Bennet's refusal to make Bingley's acquaintance, declares that she wishes the girls would stop talking about Bingley all together, as they will never meet him anyway. Mr. Bennet replies that he wishes he had known that earlier, as he has already paid Mr. Bingley a visit. Mrs. Bennet and the younger girls are shocked and ecstatic. Bingley takes an immediate liking to Jane at the local country dance, while his best friend Mr. Fitzwilliam Darcy, rumoured to be twice as rich as Bingley, declines to dance with anyone, including Elizabeth. Elizabeth's poor impression of his character is confirmed at a later gathering at Lucas Lodge, and she and Darcy clash verbally on the two nights she spends at Netherfield caring for the sick Jane, who fell ill after riding there in the rain when invited by Bingley's sister.

=== Episode 2 ===
Mr. William Collins, a sycophantic and somewhat dimwitted clergyman, visits his cousins, the Bennets. As Mr. and Mrs. Bennet do not have a son, he is currently the entailed heir of their estate, Longbourn. He intends to marry a Bennet daughter as an act of benign goodwill, to reassure Mrs. Bennet that she and her unwed daughters would not be rendered homeless once Mr. Collins inherits the estate. He therefore invites himself for a week long visit to get to know the family better and select a daughter to marry. However, the Bennet girls judge Mr. Collins to be a rather ridiculous man, an "oddity" with many peculiarities of speech and deportment. They nevertheless treat him civilly and take him to balls and social events in Meryton. One day, while on a walk around Meryton, they meet members of a newly arrived militia regiment, including Mr. George Wickham. At a social event, Wickham befriends Elizabeth and says that his father was the steward for Darcy's late father, and that he originally planned to join the clergy. However, Darcy denied Wickham the church "living" that Darcy's father had promised him. At a ball at Netherfield, Darcy asks Elizabeth to dance, which she grudgingly but politely accepts. Mrs. Bennet tells Mr. Collins that she expects Jane to soon be engaged, so he instead proposes to Elizabeth. She firmly rejects him and is supported in this by Mr. Bennet. While Mrs. Bennet reacts angrily to this, Elizabeth's close friend Charlotte Lucas invites Mr. Collins to visit her family at Lucas Lodge.

=== Episode 3 ===
Elizabeth is stunned and appalled to learn that Charlotte Lucas has accepted Mr. Collins's marriage proposal. When the Netherfield party departs for London in the autumn, Jane goes to stay with her middle-class London relations, the Gardiners, but she soon notices that the Bingleys ignore her. Elizabeth departs for the Collins' home in Kent in the spring to visit Charlotte. They live near Rosings, the estate of the formidable Lady Catherine de Bourgh, who is Darcy's aunt. Elizabeth meets Darcy several times there. Elizabeth learns of Darcy's direct responsibility for Bingley being separated from Jane's company. Soon after, Darcy unexpectedly tells her that he admires her and loves her, so much so that in spite of her inferior social standing, he proposes marriage. Elizabeth flatly rejects him, noting his arrogant, disagreeable, and proud character, and for his part in her sister's failed romance and Mr. Wickham's misfortune.

=== Episode 4 ===
Darcy justifies his previous actions in a long letter to Elizabeth: he misjudged Jane's affection for Bingley, but exposes Wickham as a gambler who once attempted to elope with Darcy's young sister, Georgiana, to obtain her inheritance. Back at Longbourn, Mr. Bennet allows Lydia to accompany the militia to Brighton as a personal friend of the militia colonel's wife. Elizabeth joins the Gardiners on a sightseeing trip to Derbyshire and visits Pemberley, Darcy's estate, during his absence. Greatly impressed by the immense scale and richness of the estate, Elizabeth listens to the housekeeper's earnest tales of her master's lifelong goodness, to the Gardiners' surprise. Meanwhile, Darcy refreshes from his unannounced journey home by taking a swim in a lake. After an unexpected and awkward encounter with Elizabeth, Darcy is able to prevent the party's premature departure with an unusual degree of friendliness and politeness.

=== Episode 5 ===
Elizabeth and the Gardiners receive an invitation to an evening at Pemberley, where she befriends Georgiana and Darcy and Elizabeth share significant glances. The next morning, Elizabeth receives two letters from Jane, revealing that Lydia has eloped from Brighton with Wickham. As Elizabeth prepares to return to Longbourn, Darcy arrives and offers help, but upon hearing the news about Lydia, becomes disturbed and leaves in haste. Elizabeth supposes she will never see him again. The Bennets are dismayed by the scandal and unable to locate Lydia, until Mr. Gardiner writes that Lydia and Wickham have been found. They are not married, but soon will be under the Gardiners' care. The Bennets are relieved, but Mr. Bennet wonders what it cost Mr. Gardiner to get Wickham to marry a girl with no fortune. Elizabeth tells Jane of her last meeting with Darcy, including her ambivalent feelings for him.

=== Episode 6 ===
After Lydia carelessly mentions Darcy's involvement in her wedding, Mrs. Gardiner enlightens Elizabeth: Darcy found the errant couple and paid for everything needed to resolve the situation, including a large payment to Wickham. When Bingley and Darcy return to Netherfield in the autumn, Darcy apologises to Bingley for interfering in his relationship with Jane, and gives his blessing for the couple to wed. Lady Catherine de Bourgh, who has long intended for Darcy to marry her sickly daughter Anne, has heard rumours of an engagement between Darcy and Elizabeth. She calls on Elizabeth, demanding that she deny the engagement and renounce Darcy forever. Elizabeth confirms that there is no engagement, but refuses any pledge for the future. When Elizabeth thanks Darcy for his role in Lydia's marriage, he says that Lady Catherine's story had encouraged him to reaffirm his feelings for Elizabeth. Elizabeth admits the complete transformation of her feelings, and agrees to their engagement, taking her family by surprise. The series ends with a double winter wedding: Jane to Bingley, and Elizabeth to Darcy.

== Cast ==
- Jennifer Ehle as Elizabeth Bennet
- Colin Firth as Mr. Fitzwilliam Darcy
- Adrian Lukis as Mr. George Wickham
- Alison Steadman as Mrs. Bennet
- Benjamin Whitrow as Mr. Bennet
- David Bamber as Mr. William Collins
- Susannah Harker as Jane Bennet
- Julia Sawalha as Lydia Bennet
- Polly Maberly as Catherine "Kitty" Bennet
- Lucy Briers as Mary Bennet
- Crispin Bonham-Carter as Mr. Charles Bingley
- Lucy Scott as Charlotte Lucas
- Anna Chancellor as Caroline Bingley
- Lucy Robinson as Mrs. Hurst
- Barbara Leigh-Hunt as Lady Catherine de Bourgh
- Anthony Calf as Colonel Fitzwilliam
- Joanna David as Mrs. Gardiner
- Tim Wylton as Mr. Gardiner
- Emilia Fox as Georgiana Darcy
- Bridget Turner as Mrs. Reynolds
- David Bark-Jones as Lieutenant Denny
- Lynn Farleigh as Mrs. Phillips
- Lucy Davis as Maria Lucas
- Christopher Benjamin as Sir William Lucas
- Rupert Vansittart as Mr. Hurst
- Marlene Sidaway as Hill
- Roger Barclay as Captain Carter
- Kate O'Malley as Sarah, the maid
- Norma Streader as Lady Lucas
- Paul Moriarty as Col Forster
- Victoria Hamilton as Mrs. Forster
- Nadia Chambers as Anne de Bourgh
- Sarah Legg as Hannah
- Christopher Staines as Lieutenant Sanderson
- Tom Ward as Lieutenant Chamberlayne
- Alexandra Howerd as Mary King
- Peter Needham as Fencing Master
- Sam Beazley as Vicar at Longbourne

== Casting ==
When casting the many characters of Pride and Prejudice, the producer Sue Birtwistle and director Simon Langton were looking for actors with wit, charm and charisma, who could play the Regency period. Their choices for the protagonists, 20-year-old Elizabeth Bennet and 28-year-old Mr. Darcy, determined the other actors cast. Hundreds of actresses between 15 and 28 auditioned for the younger female characters, and those with the right presence were screen-tested, performing several prepared scenes in period costumes and makeup in a television studio. Straight offers were made to several established actors.

Jennifer Ehle was chosen from six serious candidates to play Elizabeth, the second Bennet daughter, the brightest girl and her father's favourite. At the time in her mid-20s, Ehle had read Pride and Prejudice when she was 12 and was the only actor to be present throughout the whole filming schedule. Sue Birtwistle particularly wanted Colin Firth, a relatively unknown British actor in his mid-30s at the time, to play the wealthy and aloof Mr. Darcy. Birtwistle had worked with him on the mid-1980s comedy film Dutch Girls, but he repeatedly turned down her offer as he neither felt attracted to Austen's feminine perspective nor believed himself to be right for the role. Birtwistle's persistent coaxing and his deeper examination of the Darcy character finally convinced him to accept the role. Firth and Ehle began a romantic relationship during the filming of the series, which received media attention only after the couple's separation.

Benjamin Whitrow was cast to play Mr. Bennet, Elizabeth's distinguished but financially imprudent and occasionally indulgent gentry father. Alison Steadman was cast to play the parvenu Mrs. Bennet, Elizabeth's mortifyingly affected social-climbing mother. Steadman was offered the role without auditions or screen tests. Elizabeth's four sisters, whose ages ranged between 15 and 22, were cast to look dissimilar from each other. Susannah Harker portrayed Elizabeth's beautiful older sister Jane, who desires to only see good in others. Lucy Briers, Polly Maberly, and Julia Sawalha played Elizabeth's younger sisters – the plain Mary, the good-natured but flighty and susceptible Kitty, and frivolous and headstrong Lydia. Being 10 years older than 15-year-old Lydia, Julia Sawalha, of Absolutely Fabulous fame, had enough acting experience to get the role without screen tests. Joanna David and Tim Wylton appeared as the Gardiners, Elizabeth's maternal aunt and uncle. David Bamber played the unctuous clergyman, Mr. Collins, a cousin of Mr. Bennet. Lucy Scott portrayed Elizabeth's best friend and Mr. Collins's wife, Charlotte Lucas, and David Bark-Jones portrayed Lieutenant Denny.

The producers found Crispin Bonham-Carter to have the best physical contrast to Firth's Darcy and gave him his first major television role as the good-natured and wealthy Mr. Charles Bingley. Bonham-Carter had originally auditioned for the part of Mr. George Wickham, a handsome militia lieutenant whose charm conceals his licentiousness and greed, but Adrian Lukis was cast instead. Anna Chancellor, of Four Weddings and a Funeral fame, played Mr. Bingley's sister Caroline Bingley. (Chancellor is also Jane Austen's six-times-great-niece.) Mr. Bingley's other sister and his brother-in-law were played by Lucy Robinson (Louisa Hurst) and Rupert Vansittart (Mr. Hurst). Casting the role of Darcy's young sister, Georgiana, proved hard as the producers were looking for a young actress who appeared innocent, proud and yet shy, had class and could also play the piano. After auditioning over 70 actresses, Simon Langton suggested Emilia Fox, the real-life daughter of Joanna David (Mrs. Gardiner), for the part. Barbara Leigh-Hunt was cast as Darcy's meddling aunt, Lady Catherine de Bourgh, without auditions or screen tests.

== Production ==
=== Conception and adaptation ===
Jane Austen's novel Pride and Prejudice had already been the subject of numerous television and film adaptations, including BBC television versions in 1938, 1952, 1958, 1967 and 1980. In the autumn of 1986, after watching a preview of Austen's Northanger Abbey, Sue Birtwistle and Andrew Davies agreed to adapt Pride and Prejudice, one of their favourite books, for television. Birtwistle in particular felt that a new adaptation on film would serve the drama better than the previous videotaped Pride and Prejudice television adaptations, which looked too "undernourished" and "unpoetic". The needs of TV scheduling forced Davies to change his original plan of a five-episode adaptation to six. Birtwistle and Davies then offered the first three scripts to ITV in late 1986 to build on the guaranteed BBC audience, but the recent TV adaptation led to a delay. When ITV announced its renewed interest in 1993, Michael Wearing of the BBC commissioned the final scripts with co-funding from the American A&E Network. Director Simon Langton and the art department joined pre-production in January and February 1994.

"We treated the story with great respect, but if we wanted to be utterly faithful, we would have got someone to recite it over the radio."

— Director Simon Langton

Although Birtwistle and Davies wished to remain true to the tone and spirit of the novel, they wanted to produce "a fresh, lively story about real people", not an "old studio-bound BBC drama that was shown in the Sunday teatime slot". Emphasising sex and money as the themes of the story, Davies shifted the focus from Elizabeth to Elizabeth and Darcy and foreshadowed Darcy's role in the narrative resolution. To portray the characters as real human beings, Davies added short backstage scenes such as the Bennet girls dressing up to advertise themselves in the marriage market. New scenes where men pursue their hobbies with their peers departed from Jane Austen's focus on women. The biggest technical difficulty proved to be adapting the long letters in the second half of the story. Davies employed techniques such as voice-overs, flashbacks, and having the characters read the letters to themselves and to each other. Davies added some dialogue to clarify events from the novel to a modern audience but left much of the novel's dialogue intact.

=== Filming ===
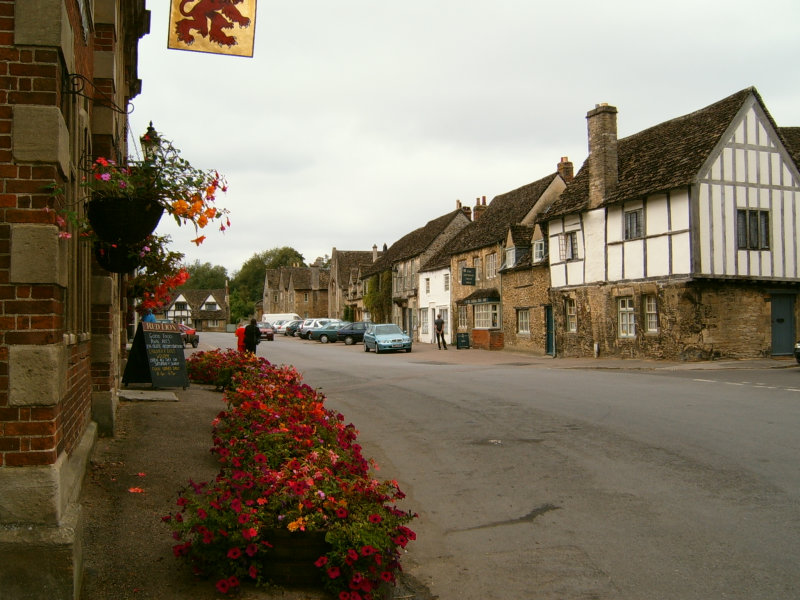
Lacock, Wiltshire was chosen to represent Meryton village

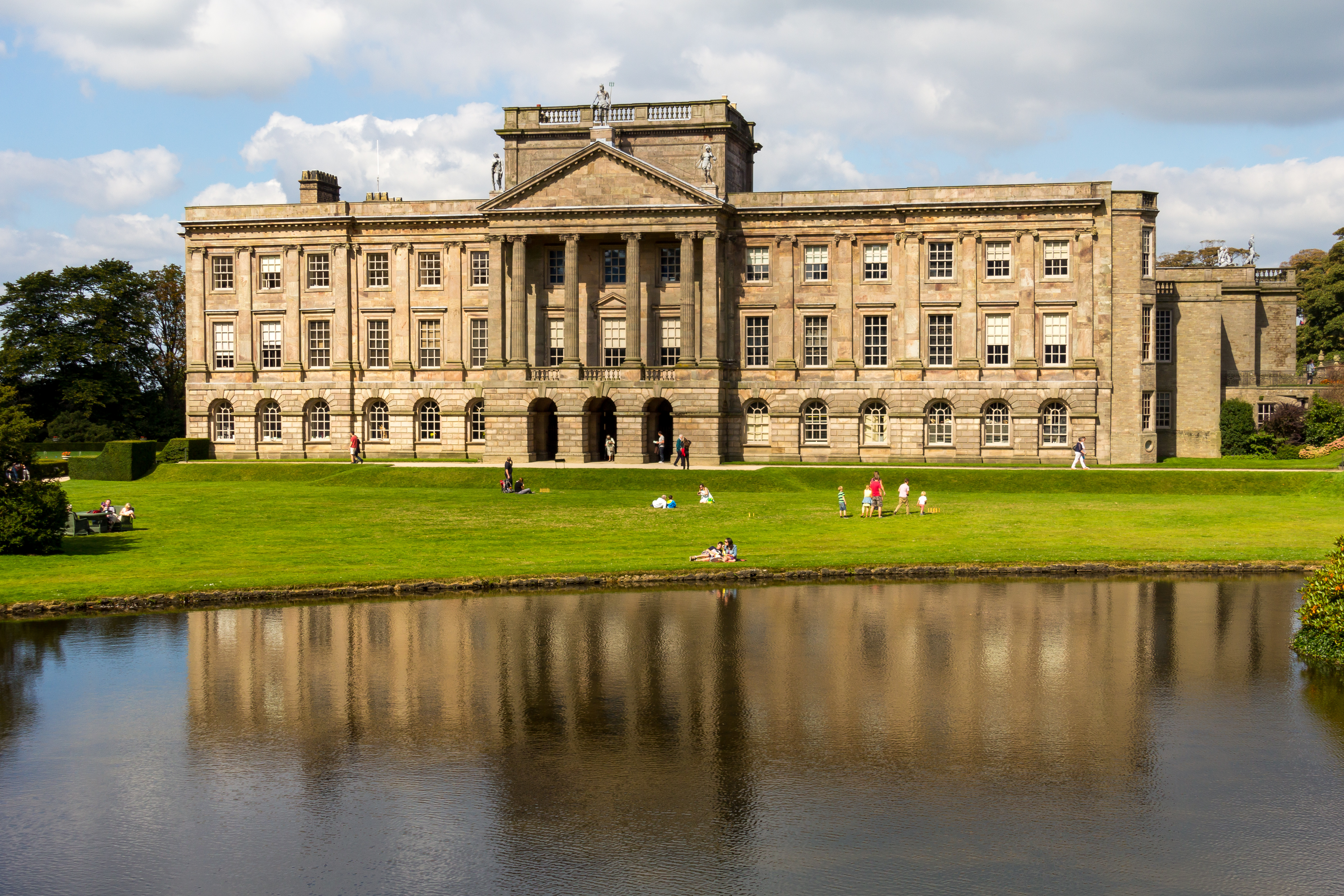
Lyme Park, Cheshire served as the exterior of Pemberley, Darcy's estate in Derbyshire

Director of photography John Kenway used Super 16mm film, which has a 5:3 widescreen aspect ratio, slightly narrower than 16:9. The series was originally broadcast 4:3 pan and scan. Later 16:9 versions were made with 6 percent vertical cropping.

The budget of about £1 million per episode (totalling US$9.6 million) allowed 20 shooting weeks of five days to film six 55-minute episodes. Production aimed for 10.5-hour shooting days plus time for costume and make-up. Two weeks before filming began, about 70 of the cast and crew gathered for the script read-through, followed by rehearsals, lessons for dancing, horse-riding, fencing, and other skills that needed to be ready ahead of the actual filming. Filming took place between June 1994 and 1 November 1994 to reflect the changing seasons in the plot, followed by post-production until mid-May 1995. Scenes in the same place were grouped in the filming schedule.

Twenty-four locations, most of them owned by the National Trust, and eight studio sets were used for filming. Reflecting the wealth differences between the main characters, the filming location for Longbourn showed the comfortable family house of the Bennet family, whereas Darcy's Pemberley needed to look like the "most beautiful place", showing good taste and the history of the aristocracy.

The first location that the producers agreed on was Lacock in Wiltshire to represent the village of Meryton. Luckington Court nearby served as the interior and exterior of Longbourn. Lyme Hall in Cheshire was chosen as Pemberley but management problems forced production to film Pemberley's interiors at Sudbury Hall in Sudbury, Derbyshire.

The producers found Belton House in Grantham, Lincolnshire the best match for Rosings, Lady Catherine de Bourgh's estate, which needed to appear "over-the-top" to reflect her disagreeableness. Old Rectory at Teigh in Rutland was chosen as Hunsford parsonage, Mr. Collins's home. Edgcote House in south-west Northamptonshire served as the interior and exterior of Bingley's Netherfield, along with Brocket Hall in Welwyn Garden City, Hertfordshire as the Netherfield ballroom. The London streets were filmed in Lord Leycester Hospital in Warwick, Warwickshire. Wickham's and Georgiana's planned elopement in Ramsgate was filmed in the English seaside resort Weston-super-Mare in Somerset. Wickham's wedding takes place in St Paul's in Deptford, London.

=== Costumes and make-up ===
Because Pride and Prejudice was a period drama, the design required more research than contemporary films. The personality and wealth of the characters were reflected in their costumes; the wealthy Bingley sisters were never shown in print dresses and they wore big feathers in their hair. As the BBC's stock of early 19th century costumes was limited, costume designer Dinah Collin designed most of the costumes, visiting museums for inspiration while trying to make the clothes attractive to a modern audience (although some costumes, mostly worn by extras, were re-used from earlier BBC productions or hired). Elizabeth's clothes had earthy tones and were fitted to allow easy and natural movements in line with the character's activity and liveliness. In contrast, Collin chose pale or creamy white colours for the clothes of the other Bennet girls to highlight their innocence and simplicity and richer colours for Bingley's sisters and Lady Catherine de Bourgh. Colin Firth participated in the wardrobe decisions and wanted his character to wear darker colours, leaving the warmer colours for Bingley.

The producers imagined Darcy to be dark despite no such references in the novel and asked Firth to dye black his light-brown hair, eyebrows and lashes; they instructed all male actors to let their hair grow before filming and shave off their moustaches. Three brunette wigs were made to cover Ehle's short, blonde hair and one wig for Alison Steadman (Mrs. Bennet) because of her thick, heavy hair. Susannah Harker's (Jane) hair was slightly lightened to contrast with Elizabeth's and was arranged in a classic Greek style to highlight the character's beauty. Mary's plainness was achieved by painting spots on Lucy Briers's face; her hair was greased to suggest an unwashed appearance and was arranged to emphasise the actress's protruding ears. As Kitty and Lydia were too young and wild to have their hair done by the maids, the actresses' hair was not changed much. Makeup artist Caroline Noble had always considered Mr. Collins a sweaty character with a moist upper lip; she also greased David Bamber's hair and gave him a low parting to suggest baldness.

=== Music and choreography ===
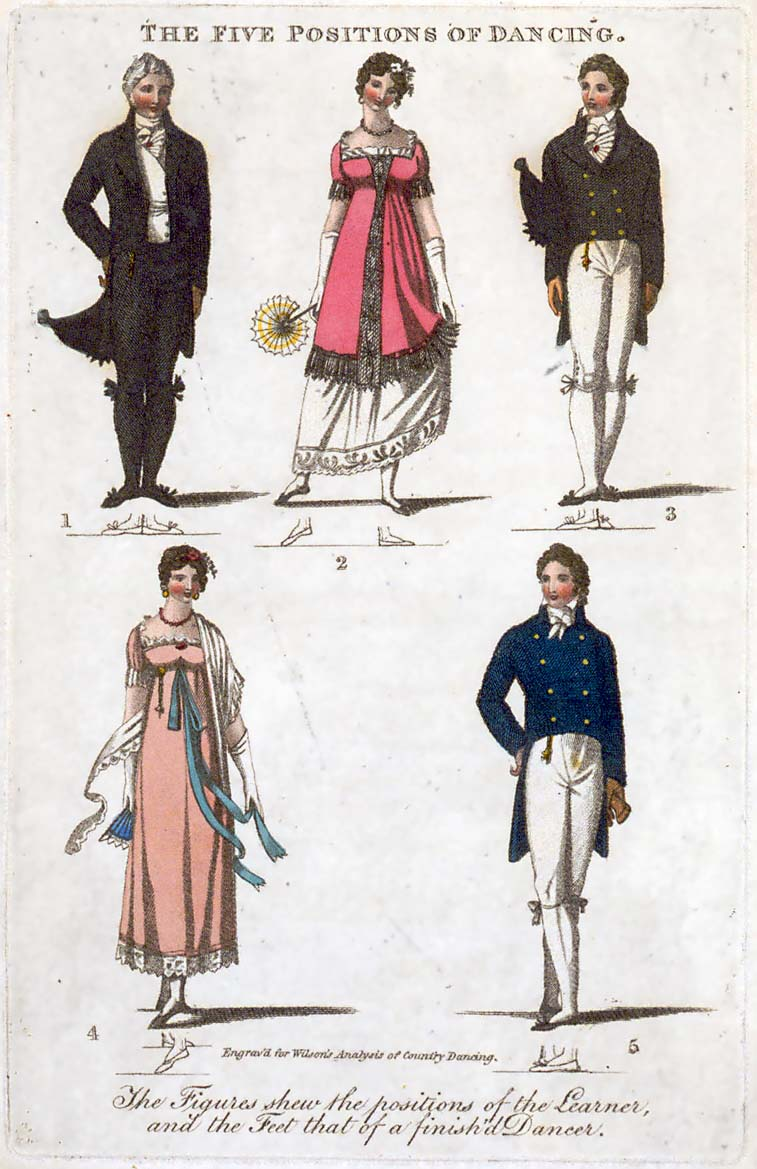
The five positions of Regency dancing, 1811

Carl Davis had been writing scores for BBC adaptations of classic novels since the mid-1970s and approached Sue Birtwistle during pre-production. Aiming to communicate the wit and vitality of the novel and its theme of marriage and love in a small town in the early 19th century, he used contemporary classical music as inspiration, in particular a popular Beethoven septet of the period, as well as a theme strongly reminiscent of the finale of Beethoven's Emperor Concerto. For control over the sound, the music was recorded in six hours by a group of up to 18 musicians and was then fed into tiny earpieces of the screen musicians, who mimed playing the instruments. The actresses whose characters played the piano, Lucy Briers (Mary) and Emilia Fox (Georgiana), were already accomplished pianists and were given the opportunity to practice weeks ahead of filming. Among the songs and movements that were played in the serial were Handel's "Air con Variazioni" from Suite No. 5 in E Major HWV 430 and "Slumber, Dear Maid" from his opera Xerxes (in 1813 these works by Handel would have been considered quite old-fashioned, adding to the perception that Mary's tastes are a bit out of fashion), Mozart's "Rondo alla turca", "Voi che sapete" and other music from his operas The Marriage of Figaro and Don Giovanni, Beethoven's Andante favori, the second movement from Muzio Clementi's Sonatina No.4 and the traditional folk song "The Barley Mow". A soundtrack with Davis's themes was released on CD in 1995. The text of Mozart's "Voi, che sapete" (sung in an English translation) is a particularly meaningful choice: the original Italian is a love song, including the words "You, who know what love is, tell me, is that what I feel in my heart?" Lizzie sings this, and soon after, she graciously "saves" Georgiana from embarrassment at the mention of Wickham, and Darcy further realizes her good heart. This musical theme is soon echoed, after that episode, as Darcy walks along the hall; tell me, is love what I feel in my heart?

Many scenes in the book were set at dances or balls. Jane Gibson based her choreography on The Apted Book of Country Dances (1966) by W.S. Porter, which had several late-18th-century dances by Charles and Samuel Thompson such as "The Shrewsbury Lasses", "A Trip to Highgate" and "Mr. Beveridge's Maggot". Although these dances gave the story an impression of authenticity, they were anachronistic, being out of fashion by the time of the story. Some fifteen dances were choreographed and rehearsed before filming. Polly Maberly and Julia Sawalha, the dance-mad Kitty and Lydia, had three days to learn the dances. Three days were allotted for the filming of the ball at Netherfield, whose pace and style concentrated on elegance rather than the community enjoying themselves as at the dance at Meryton. The musicians and dancers had earpieces with music playing to allow dialogue recording. Many wide-shots of Elizabeth's and Darcy's dance at Netherfield later turned out to be unusable because of a hair in front of a lens so the editors resorted to close-up shots and material provided by a steadicam.

== Themes and style ==
The adaptation received praise for its faithfulness to the novel, which highlights the importance of environment and upbringing on peoples' development, although privilege is not necessarily advantageous. Describing the adaptation as "a witty mix of love stories and social conniving, cleverly wrapped in the ambitions and illusions of a provincial gentry", critics noted that Davies's focus on sex and money and Austen's wry, incisive humour and the "deft" characterisation, prevented the television adaptation from "descending into the realm of a nicely-costumed, brilliantly-photographed melodrama".

"It is a truth universally acknowledged, that a single man in possession of a good fortune must be in want of a wife."

— First line of Austen's novel Pride and Prejudice

To avoid a narrator, the serial delegates the novel's ironic first sentence to Elizabeth in an early scene. The adaptation opens with a view of Darcy's and Bingley's horses as they race across a field toward the Netherfield estate, expressing vitality; Elizabeth watches them before breaking into a run. While the novel indicates Elizabeth's independence and energy in her three-mile trek to Netherfield, the adaptation of this scene also shows her rebelliousness and love of nature.

In what critic Cheryl Nixon calls "perhaps the most radical revision of Austen's text", the BBC drama departs from a late 18th-century vision of emotional restraint and portrays emotions in a "modern" interpretation of the story. Nixon argues that the novel leaves Elizabeth and the reader uncertain of Darcy's emotions and the adaptation uses additional scenes to hint at Darcy's inability to physically contain or verbally express his emotional turmoil. On the other hand, whereas the climax of the novel describes Darcy expressing his ardent love for Elizabeth at length (though Austen leaves his actual words to the reader's imagination), the adaptation elides this moment and passes directly to the next lines of dialogue. Scholars argue that activities such as billiards, bathing, fencing and swimming (see the lake scene) offer Darcy to a female gaze; he is often presented in profile by a window or a fireplace when his friends discuss Elizabeth. Many passages relating to appearance or characters' viewpoints were lifted from the novel.

In the words of Austen biographer John Halperin, the novel shows irony with "unmistakable strains of cynicism, ... laughing at human nature without any real hope of changing it". Scholar Elvira Casal argues that laughter in the story, which ranges from irresponsible laughter to laughter at people and laughter of amusement and relief, can also be linked to the sexual tensions among the different characters. Despite their appeal to modern audiences, laughter and wit were seen as vulgar and irreverent in Austen's time. As one newspaper article noted at the time the series first aired, the BBC drama made changes "with a view to exposing a character, or adding humour or irony to a situation". The adaptation comically exaggerates the characters of Mrs. Bennet, Miss Bingley and Mr. Collins, even showing Mrs. Bennet on the verge of hysteria in many of the early scenes.

The serial expands on Austen's metaphorical use of landscapes, reinforcing beauty and authenticity. Elizabeth takes every opportunity to enjoy nature and to escape exposure to Mr. Collins and Lady Catherine. Critic Sue Parrill contends that the most symbolic use of nature in the novel is Elizabeth and the Gardiners' visit to Pemberley in Derbyshire, where Elizabeth becomes conscious of her love for Darcy. The story makes nature integral in the form of Old England. Elizabeth's appreciation of the beauties of Derbyshire elevates Darcy in her and her relatives' opinion. In her analysis of landscape in the series, H. Elisabeth Ellington suggests that Darcy's gaze through the window works as a movie screen, projecting Elizabeth's actions for him and the viewer. His participation in the English landscape is his redemption.

== Reception ==
=== Broadcast ===
Between 10 and 11 million people watched the original six-episode broadcast on BBC One on Sunday evenings from 24 September to 29 October 1995. The episodes were repeated each week on BBC Two. The final episode of Pride and Prejudice had a market share of about 40 per cent in Britain, by which time eight foreign countries had bought the rights to the serial. 3.7 million Americans watched the first broadcast on the A&E Network, which aired the serial in double episodes on three consecutive evenings beginning 14 January 1996.

=== Home media and merchandise ===
The serial was released on VHS in the UK in the week running up to the original transmission of the final episode. The entire first run of 12,000 copies of the double-video set sold out within two hours of release. 70,000 copies had been sold by the end of the first week of sales, increasing to 200,000 sold units within the first year of the original airing. A BBC spokeswoman called the initial sale results "a huge phenomenon", as "it is unheard of for a video to sell even half as well, especially when viewers are able to tape the episodes at home for free". The CD soundtrack was also popular, and 20,000 copies of an official making-of book were sold within days. The serial was released on DVD four times, initially in 2000, as a digitally remastered "Tenth Anniversary Edition" in September 2005, and in April 2007 as part of a "Classic Drama DVD" magazine collection. A high-definition transfer was produced from the original negatives and released as a Blu-ray in October 2008. The HD version has not been broadcast on television; the BBC refuses to broadcast anything shot in 16 mm in HD. The same restored version was released on DVD in March 2009. The Blu-ray was released on 14 April 2009.

A 2010 Remastered Edition and a 2014 Keepsake Edition have the same footage, time lengths, and format. The 2014 Keepsake Edition has improved colors. The 2010 Remastered Edition begins with piracy warnings and then movie begins playing. The 2014 Keepsake Edition begins with five compulsory previews which can only be bypassed by skipping forward through each individual preview. The second disc of the Keepsake set also begins with the same five compulsory previews. The 2014 Keepsake Edition has 50" of new bonus materials plus the 1'45" of bonus materials that was presented in the 2010 Remastered Edition. These bonus materials include interviews with the producer, screenwriter, director, musical composer, and cast members. The cast interviews in both editions do not include interviews with the two main characters, Colin Firth (Mr. Darcy) and Jennifer Ehle (Elizabeth Bennet).

In 2010/2011 a restored 4K version was released to streaming and download services such as Amazon. A 4K physical media version has yet to be released.

=== Critical reception ===
The critical response to Pride and Prejudice was overwhelmingly positive. Gerard Gilbert of The Independent recommended the opening episode of the serial one day before the British premiere, saying the television adaptation is "probably as good as it [can get for a literary classic]. The casting in particular deserves a tilt at a BAFTA, Firth not being in the slightest bit soft and fluffy – and Jennifer Ehle showing the right brand of spirited intelligence as Elizabeth." He considered Benjamin Whitrow a "real scene-stealer with his Mr. Bennet", but was undecided about Alison Steadman's portrayal of Mrs. Bennet. Reviewing the first episode for the same newspaper on the day after transmission, Jim White praised Andrew Davies for "injecting into the proceedings a pace and energy which at last provides a visual setting to do justice to the wit of the book. With everyone slinging themselves about at high speed (the dances, in a first for the genre, actually involve a bit of sweat), it looks like people are doing something you would never have suspected they did in Austen's time: having fun."

A few days before the American premiere, Howard Rosenberg of the Los Angeles Times considered the adaptation "decidedly agreeable" despite its incidental liberties with Austen's novel, and named Elizabeth's parents and Mr. Collins as the main source of humour. John O'Connor of The New York Times lauded the serial as a "splendid adaptation, with a remarkably faithful and sensitively nuanced script". He commented on Jennifer Ehle's ability to make Elizabeth "strikingly intelligent and authoritative without being overbearing", and noted how Firth "brilliantly captures Mr. Darcy's snobbish pride while conveying, largely through intense stares, that he is falling in love despite himself". O'Connor praised Barbara Leigh-Hunt's portrayal of Lady Catherine as "a marvellously imperious witch" and considered her scenes with David Bamber (Mr. Collins) "hilarious".

However, O'Connor remarked that American audiences might find the "languorous walks across meadows" and "ornately choreographed dances" of the British production too slow. In one of the most negative reviews, People Magazine considered the adaptation "a good deal more thorough than necessary" and "not the best Austen on the suddenly crowded market". Although the reviewer thought Firth "magnificent", he rebuked the casting of Jennifer Ehle as her oval face made her "look like Anaïs Nin in period clothes, and that ain't right". The official A&E Network magazine summarised a year later that "critics praised the lavish production, audiences adored it, and women everywhere swooned over Darcy. So much, in fact, that newspapers began to joke about 'Darcy fever.'" Commendation for the serial continued in the years following its original transmission.

=== Awards and nominations ===
Pride and Prejudice received BAFTA Television Award nominations for "Best Drama Serial", "Best Costume Design", and "Best Make Up/Hair" in 1996. Jennifer Ehle was honoured with a BAFTA for "Best Actress", while Colin Firth and Benjamin Whitrow, nominated for "Best Actor", lost to Robbie Coltrane of Cracker. Firth won the 1996 Broadcasting Press Guild Award for "Best Actor", complemented by the same award for "Best Drama Series/Serial". The serial was recognised in the United States with an Emmy for "Outstanding Individual Achievement in Costume Design for a Miniseries or a Special", and was Emmy-nominated for its achievements as an "Outstanding Miniseries" as well as for choreography and writing. Among other awards and nominations, Pride and Prejudice received a Peabody Award, a Television Critics Association Award, and a Golden Satellite Award nomination for outstanding achievements as a serial.

== Influence and legacy ==
As one of the BBC's and A&E's most popular presentations ever, the serial was, in Louise Watson's words, "a cultural phenomenon, inspiring hundreds of newspaper articles and making the novel a commuter favourite". With the 1995 and 1996 films Persuasion, Sense and Sensibility and two 1996 adaptations of Emma (one Emma starring Kate Beckinsale and one Emma starring Gwyneth Paltrow), the serial was part of a wave of Jane Austen enthusiasm which caused the membership of the Jane Austen Society of North America to jump fifty per cent in 1996 and to over 4,000 members in the autumn of 1997. Some newspapers like The Wall Street Journal explained this "Austen-mania" as a commercial move of the television and film industry, whereas others attributed Austen's popularity to escapism.

While Jennifer Ehle refused to capitalise on the success of the serial and joined the Royal Shakespeare Company at Stratford-upon-Avon, the role of Mr. Darcy unexpectedly elevated Colin Firth to stardom. Although Firth did not mind being recognised as "a romantic idol as a Darcy with smouldering sex appeal" in a role that "officially turned him into a heart-throb", he expressed the wish to not be associated with Pride and Prejudice forever and was reluctant to accept similar roles. He took on diverse roles and co-starred in productions such as The English Patient (1996), Shakespeare in Love (1998), Bridget Jones's Diary (2001 – although this film is essentially an adaptation of Pride and Prejudice in which Firth effectively reprises the role of Darcy), Girl with a Pearl Earring (2003), Love Actually (2003) and Bridget Jones: The Edge of Reason (2004).

Pride and Prejudice continued to be honoured years later. A 2000 poll of industry professionals conducted by the British Film Institute ranked the serial at 99 in the 100 Greatest British Television Programmes of the 20th century, which the BFI attributed to its "managing to combine faithfulness to the novel with a freshness that appealed across the generations". Radio Times included the serial in their list of "40 greatest TV programmes ever made" in 2003. It was also named by Entertainment Weekly as one of the 20 best miniseries of all time. In 2007, the UK Film Council declared Pride and Prejudice one of the television dramas that have become "virtual brochures" for British history and society. Lyme Hall, Cheshire, which had served as the exterior of Pemberley, experienced a tripling in its visitor numbers after the series' broadcast and is still a popular travel destination.

=== Lake scene ===
A scene with Colin Firth as Mr. Darcy after a swim in a lake is recognised as "one of the most unforgettable moments in British television history".

The adaptation is famous for a scene in its fourth episode where a fully dressed Darcy, having emerged from a swim in a lake at Pemberley, accidentally encounters Elizabeth. While many critics attributed the scene's appeal to Firth's sexual attractiveness, Andrew Davies thought that it unwittingly "rerobed, not disrobed, Austen". When Davies wrote the scene (it was not part of Austen's novel), he did not intend a sexual connection between Elizabeth and Darcy but to create "an amusing moment in which Darcy tries to maintain his dignity while improperly dressed and sopping wet". The BBC opposed Davies's plan to have Darcy naked but the producers discarded the alternative of using underpants as fatuous. According to Davies, Firth had "a bit of the usual tension about getting [his] kit off", the scene was filmed with Firth in linen shirt, breeches and boots. A stuntman, who appears in midair in a very brief shot, was hired because of the risk of infection with Weil's disease at Lyme Park. A short underwater segment was filmed separately with Firth in a tank at Ealing Studios in west London.

The Guardian declared the lake scene "one of the most unforgettable moments in British TV history". The sequence also appeared in Channel 4's Top 100 TV Moments in 1999, between the controversial programme Death on the Rock and the Gulf War. The New York Times compared the scene to Marlon Brando shouting "Stella!" in his undershirt in A Streetcar Named Desire and Firth's projects began alluding to it – screenwriter-director Richard Curtis added in-joke moments of Firth's characters falling into the water to Love Actually and Bridget Jones: The Edge of Reason, and Firth's character from the 2007 film St Trinian's emerges from a fountain in a soaking wet shirt before meeting up with an old love. The creators of the 2008 ITV production Lost in Austen emulated the lake scene in their Pride and Prejudice through their contemporary heroine who cajoles Darcy into recreating the moment.

Cheryl L. Nixon suggested in Jane Austen in Hollywood that Darcy's dive is a "revelation of his emotional capabilities", expressing a "Romantic bond with nature, a celebration of his home where he can 'strip down' to his essential self, a cleansing of social prejudices from his mind, or ... a rebirth of his love for Elizabeth". Linda Troost and Sayre Greenfield wrote that the scene "tells us more about our current decade's obsession with physical perfection and acceptance of gratuitous nudity than it does about Austen's Darcy, but the image carves a new facet into the text".

=== Bridget Jones ===
The fictional journalist Bridget Jones (in reality Helen Fielding of The Independent) wrote of her love of the serial in the paper's Bridget Jones's Diary column during the original British broadcast, mentioning her "simple human need for Darcy to get off with Elizabeth" and regarding the couple as her "chosen representatives in the field of shagging, or rather courtship". Fielding loosely reworked the plot of Pride and Prejudice in her 1996 novel of the column, naming Bridget's uptight love interest "Mark Darcy" and describing him exactly like Colin Firth. Following a first meeting with Firth during his filming of Fever Pitch in 1996, Fielding asked Firth to collaborate in what would become a multi-page interview between Bridget Jones and Firth in her 1999 sequel novel, The Edge of Reason. Conducting the real interview with Firth in Rome, Fielding lapsed into Bridget Jones mode and obsessed over Darcy in his wet shirt for the fictional interview. Firth participated in the editing of what critics called "one of the funniest sequences in the diary's sequel". Both novels make various other references to the BBC serial.

Andrew Davies collaborated on the screenplays for the 2001 and 2004 Bridget Jones films, in which Crispin Bonham-Carter (Mr. Bingley) and Lucy Robinson (Mrs. Hurst) appeared in minor roles. The self-referential in-joke between the projects convinced Colin Firth to accept the role of Mark Darcy, as it gave him an opportunity to ridicule and liberate himself from his Pride and Prejudice character. Film critic James Berardinelli would later state that Firth "plays this part [of Mark Darcy] exactly as he played the earlier role, making it evident that the two Darcys are essentially the same". The producers never found a way to incorporate the Jones-Firth interview in the second film but shot a spoof interview with Firth as himself and Renée Zellweger staying in character as Bridget Jones after a day's wrap. The scene, which extended Bridget's Darcy obsession to cover Firth's lake scene in Love Actually, is available as a bonus feature on the DVD.

=== Other adaptations ===
For almost a decade, the 1995 TV serial was considered "so dominant, so universally adored, [that] it has lingered in the public consciousness as a cinematic standard". Comparing six Pride and Prejudice adaptations in 2005, the Daily Mirror gave 9/10 to the 1995 serial ("what may be the ultimate adaptation") and the 2005 film adaptation, leaving the other adaptations such as the 1940 film behind with six or fewer points. The 2005 film was "obviously [not as] daring or revisionist" as the 1995 adaptation but the youth of the film's leads, Keira Knightley and Matthew Macfadyen, was mentioned favourably over the 1995 cast, as Jennifer Ehle had formerly been "a little too 'heavy' for the role". The president of the Jane Austen Society of North America noted in an otherwise positive review that the casting of the 2005 leads was "arguably a little more callow than Firth and Ehle" and that "Knightley is better looking than Lizzy should strictly be". The critical reception of Macfadyen's Darcy, whose casting had proven difficult because "Colin Firth cast a very long shadow", ranged from praise through pleasant surprise to dislike. Several critics did not observe any significant impact of Macfadyen's Darcy in the following years. Garth Pearce of The Sunday Times noted in 2007 that "Colin Firth will forever be remembered as the perfect Mr. Darcy", and Gene Seymour stated in a 2008 Newsday article that Firth was "'universally acknowledged' as the definitive Mr. Darcy".
