= Pride and Prejudice (1980 TV series) =

1980 British television drama series

- DVD cover
- Written by: Fay Weldon
- Directed by: Cyril Coke
- Starring: Elizabeth Garvie; David Rintoul
- Music by: Wilfred Josephs
- Country of origin: United Kingdom
- No. of series: 1
- No. of episodes: 5

Production
- Producer: Jonathan Powell
- Running time: 55 minutes (per episode)

Original release
- Network: BBC2
- Release: 13 January – 10 February 1980

Pride and Prejudice is a 1980 television serial, adapted by British novelist Fay Weldon from Jane Austen's 1813 novel of the same name. It is a co-production of the BBC and the Australian Broadcasting Corporation. The five-episode dramatisation stars Elizabeth Garvie as Elizabeth Bennet and David Rintoul as Mr. Darcy. In the US, it was broadcast by PBS television as part of Masterpiece Theatre.

The novel has been the subject of a great many television and film adaptations. This was the fifth adaptation for the BBC. Other BBC television versions aired in 1938, 1952, 1958, 1967 and 1995.

== Cast ==
- Elizabeth Garvie as Elizabeth Bennet
- David Rintoul as Fitzwilliam Darcy
- Peter Settelen as George Wickham
- Priscilla Morgan as Mrs. Bennet
- Moray Watson as Mr. Bennet
- Sabina Franklyn as Jane Bennet
- Natalie Ogle as Lydia Bennet
- Tessa Peake-Jones as Mary Bennet
- Clare Higgins as Kitty Bennet
- Osmund Bullock as Charles Bingley
- Marsha Fitzalan as Caroline Bingley
- Jennifer Granville as Mrs. Hurst
- Edward Arthur as Mr. Hurst
- Irene Richard as Charlotte Lucas
- Malcolm Rennie as Mr. Collins
- Elizabeth Stewart as Lady Lucas
- Peter Howell as Sir William Lucas
- Judy Parfitt as Lady Catherine de Bourgh
- Moir Leslie as Anne de Bourgh
- Emma Jacobs as Georgiana Darcy
- Desmond Adams as Colonel Fitzwilliam
- Shirley Cain as Mrs. Phillips
- Barbara Shelley as Mrs. Gardiner
- Michael Lees as Mr. Gardiner

== Episodes ==
No.	Original release date
1	13 January 1980
When Mr. Bingley comes to live in the neighborhood near Meryton, Mrs. Bennet considers him the rightful property of one of her five unmarried daughters. She is desperate for at least one of them to marry well, since there is no son to inherit Mr. Bennet's Longbourn estate. The eldest daughter Jane attracts the attentions of Mr. Bingley. Mr. Darcy gains Elizabeth Bennet's antipathy when she overhears him refer to her as "not handsome enough to tempt me." Mr. Bingley's friend Mr. Darcy is unpopular in local society due to his haughty manners. When Jane is befriended by the Bingley sisters and invited to visit, Mrs. Bennet schemes for Jane to be caught in the rain and thus have to spend the night. When Jane becomes ill, Elizabeth goes to Longbourn to care for Jane, causing censure by Caroline Bingley to the others. Caroline is chagrined when Darcy expresses admiration for Elizabeth's spirit.
2	20 January 1980
The Reverend Mr. Collins, the cousin who will in time inherit Longbourn in the absence of a Bennet son, seeks a reconciliation with the Bennet family after an estrangement dating back to his father's time. He intends to choose one of the five daughters as his wife. The second eldest daughter Elizabeth becomes interested in Mr. Wickham, a recently arrived militia soldier who relates to Elizabeth his grievances against Mr. Darcy, intensifying her prejudice. When Darcy asks Elizabeth to dance at a ball, she verbally spars with him while dancing. When Bingley continues to show marked interest in Jane, Mrs. Bennet indiscreetly remarks that Bingley and Jane will soon be engaged and is overheard by Caroline Bingley and Darcy. Mr. Collins proposes to Elizabeth but is refused, and instead becomes engaged to her friend Charlotte Lucas.
3	27 January 1980
Mr. Bingley abruptly departs to London with Mr. Darcy. This hurts Jane deeply, and Elizabeth is convinced that Miss Bingley is to blame for the separation. When Mr. Wickham becomes engaged to wealthy Miss King, he is criticized as mercenary by neighborhood gossips. Elizabeth goes to stay with her friend Charlotte, now married to Mr. Collins and living in Kent near Rosings, home of his patroness Lady Catherine de Bourgh. Darcy and his cousin, Colonel Fitzwilliam, visit their aunt, Lady Catherine. Elizabeth finds the colonel friendly but cannot resist needling Darcy for his haughty behavior. Elizabeth doubts Charlotte's observation that Darcy is showing an interest in her by calling on her and joining her on walks. Lady Catherine makes it clear that she expects Darcy to marry her daughter, the inhibited Miss Anne de Bourgh. Colonel Fitzwilliam inadvertently discloses that Darcy prevented Bingley's "imprudent marriage," fueling Elizabeth's outrage. Receiving a surprise proposal of marriage from Mr. Darcy, Elizabeth refuses him, finding the manner of his proposal insulting and unworthy of a gentleman. Stung by her refusal, Darcy writes a letter to Elizabeth addressing her accusations against him of influencing Bingley against Jane and ruining Wickham's prospects. When she learns the truth about Wickham, Elizabeth begins to grow ashamed of her former prejudice.
4	3 February 1980
Jane is astonished at the news that Darcy has proposed to Elizabeth and been refused. Jane and Elizabeth agree that Wickham's attempted seduction of Georgina Darcy, revealed by Darcy in confidence, should not be disclosed. Against Elizabeth's advice, Mr. Bennet allows the flirtatious Lydia to stay with friends in Brighton, where the regiment has relocated. After Miss King breaks their engagement, Wickham renews his attentions to Elizabeth, who now expresses skepticism to his grievances against Darcy. Lydia begins to flirt with Wickham. Elizabeth is invited on a trip to Derbyshire with her aunt and uncle Gardiner, where they stop to see Pemberley, the estate of the esteemed Darcy family. Elizabeth reflects privately on how she might have come to Pemberley as its mistress, beginning to regret lost opportunities. Unexpectedly encountering Darcy himself, who has arrived with the Bingleys and his sister, Elizabeth and the Gardiners are greeted warmly by Darcy, received as guests, and introduced to Georgina Darcy.
5	10 February 1980
The elopement of Wickham with youngest sister Lydia Bennet throws everything into disarray for a time. When Darcy excuses himself abruptly on learning of the elopement, Elizabeth fears he is distancing himself from the scandal. Mr. Gardiner and Mr. Bennet pursue Lydia and Wickham to ensure a marriage takes place. Lydia lets slip to Elizabeth that Darcy was at her marriage, and Mrs. Gardiner confirms that Darcy arranged the financial settlement that induced Wickham to marry Lydia. Bingley and Darcy call to pay respects to the Bennet family, and Bingley asks for Jane's hand and is accepted. Hearing rumors of a pending engagement between Darcy and Elizabeth, Lady Catherine de Bourgh calls on Elizabeth and attempts to extract a pledge that she will not marry Darcy. Although doubtful of a second proposal from Darcy, Elizabeth refuses to make such a promise. Elizabeth fears that Darcy will eschew being brother-in-law to Wickham but sees Lady Catherine's anxiety as a hopeful sign. Darcy calls on Elizabeth and again proposes, this time being assured by Elizabeth that her feelings have changed completely and accepting his proposal with gratitude for what he has done for her family. Mrs. Bennet is ecstatic at the promise of having three daughters well married.
