= Pride and Prejudice (1958 TV series) =

1958 British television drama series

- Based on: Pride and Prejudice by Jane Austen
- Written by: Cedric Wallis
- Starring: Jane Downs; Alan Badel
- Country of origin: United Kingdom
- No. of series: 1
- No. of episodes: 6 (all missing)

Production
- Producer: Barbara Burnham
- Running time: 30 minutes (per episode)

Original release
- Network: BBC
- Release: 24 January – 28 February 1958

Pride and Prejudice is a 1958 British television adaptation of the Jane Austen's 1813 novel of the same name, which aired on the BBC. Cast members included Alan Badel, Pamela Binns, Jane Downs, Susan Lyall Grant, Marian Spencer, Vivienne Martin, Hugh Sinclair, William Squire, Joan Carol, Jeanne Elvin, Colin Jeavons, Barbara New, and Greta Watson. Six half-hour episodes were produced, presumably aired live (since that was usually the case with BBC drama of the era), and telerecorded for overseas broadcast. All six episodes were subsequently junked and are believed to be lost. The designer was Stephen Bundy.

== Cast ==
- Jane Downs as Elizabeth Bennet
- Alan Badel as Mr Darcy
- Pamela Binns as Mary Bennet
- Susan Lyall Grant as Jane Bennet
- Marian Spencer as Mrs Bennet
- Vivienne Martin as Lydia Bennet
- Hugh Sinclair as Mr Bennet
- William Squire as Mr Bingley
- Joan Carol as Mrs Gardiner
- Jeanne Elvin as Servant
- Colin Jeavons as Mr Wickham
- Barbara New as Charlotte Lucas
- Greta Watson as Caroline Bingley
- Hamilton Dyce as Mr Gardiner
- Jack May as Mr Collins
- Phyllis Neilson-Terry as Lady Catherine de Bourgh
- Robert Crewsdon as Colonel Fitzwilliam
- Jeremy Geidt as Captain Denny
- Hazel Hughes as Lady Lucas
- Madoline Thomas as Mrs Reynolds

== Episodes ==
Episode No.	Original Broadcast Date
1	24 January 1958
2	31 January 1958
3	7 February 1958
4	14 February 1958
5	21 February 1958
6	28 February 1958

== Reception ==
The series was exported to Australia where it was shown on ABC. A reviewer for The Australian Women's Weekly called it "delightful", said "for out-of-this-world entertainment I'll nominate Jane Austen", and praised the performances of Jane Downs and Alan Badel. A still photograph appeared in an earlier edition of the magazine.
