= Elizabeth Garvie =

British actress

- Born: Elizabeth Garvie; 6 April 1957 (age 69); Bristol
- Occupation: Actress
- Known for: Pride and Prejudice
- Spouse: Anton Rodgers (m. 1983; died 2007)
- Children: 3

Elizabeth Garvie (born 1957) is an English actress known for her role as Elizabeth Bennet in the 1980 BBC dramatisation of Pride and Prejudice. Her other screen roles include Nancy Rufford in The Good Soldier (1981), Lady Elizabeth Montford in The House of Eliott (1992), the later Queen Camilla in Diana: Her True Story (1993), and Diana Rivers in Jane Eyre (1997). She has guest starred on the television series The Agatha Christie Hour, Alas Smith and Jones, Midsomer Murders, and Miss Marple.

Garvie has spent most of her career working as a stage actress; with notable performances including the roles of Cecily in The Importance of Being Earnest and Sofya in Wild Honey at the Royal National Theatre; Joanna in Sweeney Todd and Natalia in A Month in the Country at The Old Vic; Joy Davidman in Shadowlands in the United Kingdom national tour; Kitty in Charley's Aunt for the Cambridge Theatre; Mrs Manningham in Gaslight at Theatr Clwyd; Paulina Salas in Death and the Maiden at the Watermill Theatre; and Sheila in A Day in the Death of Joe Egg at the King's Head Theatre.

== Personal life and family ==
Garvie was born in Bristol, and studied drama at the University of Bristol. She was married to the actor Anton Rodgers from 1983 until his death on 1 December 2007. She survives him with their three sons. The couple appeared together in the Thames Television serial Something In Disguise, written and dramatised by Elizabeth Jane Howard. Garvie is a Trustee of The Actors' Children's Trust, which helps the children of actors.

== Filmography ==
=== Film ===
Year	Title	Role	Notes
1981	The Good Soldier	Nancy Rufford	TV movie
1992	Hostage	Mary Rennie	
2008	Baghdad Express	Interviewer	

=== Television ===
Year	Title	Role	Notes
1980	Pride and Prejudice	Elizabeth "Lizzy" Bennet	5 episodes
1982	Something in Disguise	Liz	6 episodes
1982	The Agatha Christie Hour	Jane Cleveland	one episode
1991	Shrinks	Beth Myers	7 episodes
1992	The House of Eliott	Lady Elizabeth Montford	6 episodes
1992	The Mirror Crack'd from Side to Side	Ella Zeilinsky	TV movie
1993	Diana: Her True Story	Camilla Parker Bowles	TV movie
1997	Jane Eyre	Diana Rivers	TV movie
1997	Alas Smith & Jones		1 episode
1998	Bloodlines: Legacy of a Lord	Veronica Lucan	
1999	Midsomer Murders	Muriel Saxby	1 episode
