= Pride and Prejudice and Zombies (film) =

2016 film by Burr Steers

- Theatrical release poster
- Directed by: Burr Steers
- Screenplay by: Burr Steers
- Based on: Pride and Prejudice and Zombies by Seth Grahame-Smith
- Produced by: Sean McKittrick; Allison Shearmur; Natalie Portman; Annette Savitch; Brian Oliver; Tyler Thompson; Marc Butan
- Starring: Lily James; Sam Riley; Jack Huston; Bella Heathcote; Douglas Booth; Matt Smith; Charles Dance; Lena Headey
- Cinematography: Remi Adefarasin
- Edited by: Padraic McKinley
- Music by: Fernando Velázquez
- Production companies: Screen Gems; Cross Creek Pictures; Sierra Pictures; MadRiver Pictures; QC Entertainment; Allison Shearmur Productions; Handsomecharlie Films; Head Gear Films
- Distributed by: Sony Pictures Releasing (United States); Lionsgate (United Kingdom)
- Release dates: January 21, 2016 (Los Angeles); February 5, 2016 (United States); February 11, 2016 (United Kingdom)
- Running time: 108 minutes
- Countries: United Kingdom; United States
- Language: English
- Budget: $28 million
- Box office: $16.5 million

Pride and Prejudice and Zombies (stylized as Pride + Prejudice + Zombies) is a 2016 action comedy horror film based on the 2009 novel by Seth Grahame-Smith, which parodies the 1813 novel Pride and Prejudice by Jane Austen. The film is directed by Burr Steers, who wrote the adapted screenplay, and stars Lily James, Sam Riley, Jack Huston, Bella Heathcote, Douglas Booth, Matt Smith, Charles Dance, and Lena Headey. The film follows the general plot of Austen's original novel, with elements of zombie, horror, and post-apocalyptic fiction incorporated.

Development of a film adaptation based on Grahame-Smith's novel began in 2009, with Natalie Portman attached to star and produce and Lionsgate to distribute. However, the film went through development hell, with budgetary disputes halting pre-production. Principal photography took place in South East England from September 24, 2014 until November 21.

Pride and Prejudice and Zombies premiered in Los Angeles on January 23, 2016 and was theatrically released by Screen Gems on February 5, 2016 in the United States, and by Lionsgate on February 11 in the United Kingdom. The film received generally mixed reviews from critics, with criticism for the tone, action, and plot, but praise for the production values, acting, and humor. It was a commercial failure, grossing just $16 million worldwide against a budget of $28 million.

== Plot ==
Early 19th century England is besieged by zombies; the Bennet sisters—Elizabeth, Jane, Kitty, Lydia, and Mary—have all been trained in the art of weaponry and martial arts in Qing Dynasty-era China at their father's behest so they can defend themselves. Mrs. Bennet only wants to see her daughters married off to wealthy suitors. The Bennets attend a country dance also attended by newcomers Colonel Darcy, his good friend the amiable Charles Bingley and Bingley's snobbish sister Caroline. There, the young and handsome Bingley falls for lovely, sweet natured Jane. Charles Bingley has inherited £100,000 (£6.0 million today) - attracting Mrs. Bennet's attention as a desirable suitor for her daughter. When zombies attack the ball, the Bennet sisters fight them off, and Colonel Darcy, a skilled zombie killer who was trained in Japanese martial arts - with property that pays him £10,000 annually (£600,000 today) - becomes attracted to Elizabeth after seeing her fighting skills, although his behavior is outwardly aloof. During the ball, Darcy is disgusted to overhear Mrs. Bennet's mercenary delight that Jane has attracted a rich man. On the way to the Bingleys' some days later, Jane is attacked by a zombie and catches a fever. Darcy orders her confined in fear that she may have been bitten, but her illness is not zombie-related, and she recovers.

The Bennets are visited by a cousin, the overbearing Parson Collins, who, as the only surviving male heir in the family, will inherit the Bennet home upon Mr. Bennet's death. Collins proposes to Elizabeth but states that she must give up her life as a warrior, something she refuses to do. Elizabeth meets a charming soldier named George Wickham and arranges to meet him at another ball. She travels with him to a church that is filled with zombies who feed on pig brains instead of human brains, keeping their behaviour relatively normal. Wickham believes that humans can coexist with these new "civilized" zombies. He informs Elizabeth that Darcy convinced the Bingleys to leave the county to keep Bingley away from Jane and then asks her to elope with him, but she refuses. When Darcy proposes to Elizabeth, having fallen in love with her despite his apparent coldness, she expresses outrage at his actions concerning Jane and fights him.

Darcy later writes Elizabeth a letter to apologize. He regrets that he separated Jane and Bingley, fearing that Jane only wanted to marry Bingley for his wealth. He also exposes Wickham's true nature. He and Wickham were childhood friends, but Wickham may have murdered Darcy's father, squandered his inheritance, and tried to elicit additional money from Darcy's estate. When that fails, Wickham tries to elope with Darcy's young sister, Georgiana, for her fortune. Elizabeth learns that Wickham has run off with Lydia and London has been overrun with zombies. Darcy saves Lydia and learns that Wickham is using the "civilized" zombies to create a zombie army, which has overrun London based on Wickham's plan to rule the country. He stops him by giving the zombies human brains, which turns them savage.

While fighting, Darcy stabs Wickham's chest, revealing him to have been undead all along, like the other supposedly tame zombies. Elizabeth saves Darcy from being killed by Wickham, who escapes (though Elizabeth has chopped off his right arm). As the two ride across a bridge, the human army destroys it to keep the zombies from crossing over from London. Darcy is injured in the explosion, and Elizabeth tearfully admits her love for him. After Darcy recovers, he proposes to Elizabeth again, and this time, she accepts. The two have a joint wedding with Bingley and Jane.

In a mid-credits scene, Wickham arrives with his zombie army, along with the four horsemen, to crash the wedding, leaving everyone's fate unknown.

== Cast ==
- Lily James as Elizabeth Bennet
- Sam Riley as Mr. Darcy
- Jack Huston as George Wickham
- Bella Heathcote as Jane Bennet
- Douglas Booth as Mr. Bingley
- Matt Smith as Parson Collins
- Charles Dance as Mr. Bennet
- Lena Headey as Lady Catherine de Bourgh
- Sally Phillips as Mrs. Bennet
- Emma Greenwell as Caroline Bingley
- Ellie Bamber as Lydia Bennet
- Millie Brady as Mary Bennet
- Suki Waterhouse as Kitty Bennet

== Production ==
=== Development ===
The film is based on the 2009 novel of the same name, which was billed as having been co-written by Jane Austen and Seth Grahame-Smith. The project was first announced on December 10, 2009, in Variety, when it was revealed that Natalie Portman would both star in the role of Elizabeth Bennet and produce, and that Lionsgate would finance and distribute. On December 14, David O. Russell was announced as the writer and director of the film. On October 5, 2010, it was revealed that Russell had left the production due to scheduling conflicts. Russell later revealed that he had disputes with Lionsgate over the budget. The next day, it was announced that Portman had quit the role of Elizabeth Bennet, though she would still produce the film. Following Russell's departure, Lionsgate offered Mike Newell and Matt Reeves the chance to take over from him, but both declined. On November 3, 2010, the Los Angeles Times reported that Lionsgate had held meetings with Mike White, Neil Marshall and Jeffrey Blitz as potential directors. White was hired on November 5. On January 19, 2011, it was announced that White had had to leave the film due to scheduling conflicts with a pre-existing commitment at HBO.

In February 2011, Craig Gillespie took over as director. Gillespie revealed he was attracted to the project by the mashing of genres. In May 2011, screenwriter Marti Noxon was hired to rewrite Russell's script. On October 27, 2011, it was announced that Gillespie had left the film. The project then stalled until March 2013, when Panorama Media joined to produce, finance, and handle foreign sales. In May, it was announced that Burr Steers would take over as director. Steers did a rewrite of the script, saying that he had reinserted "all the Pride and Prejudice beats”. On September 23, 2014, Screen Gems picked up distribution rights in the United States; Sierra/Affinity separately sold rights in Latin America, Scandinavia, Eastern Europe and Iceland to Sony Pictures Worldwide Acquisitions.

At one point, Lily Collins, Jennifer Aniston, and Rowan Atkinson were all attached to the project.

=== Filming ===
Principal photography began on September 24, 2014 at West Wycombe House & Park, Buckinghamshire. In early November, crews were filming at Basing House in Old Basing. On November 13, filming shifted to Frensham in Surrey, where they shot until November 21.

== Soundtrack ==
Pride and Prejudice and Zombies: Original Motion Picture Soundtrack

Film score by Fernando Velázquez
- Released: February 5, 2016
- Recorded: 2015
- Genre: Soundtrack
- Length: 58:06
- Label: Varèse Sarabande

The film's soundtrack was released digitally on February 5, 2016, and physically on February 12 by Varèse Sarabande. The soundtrack features the film's original score, composed and conducted by Fernando Velázquez.

Pride and Prejudice and Zombies: Original Motion Picture Soundtrack
No.	Title	Length
1.	"Darcy"	4:00
2.	"An Illustrated History of England 1700-1800"	2:20
3.	"Dressing for the Dance"	0:36
4.	"The Man from Uribe"	2:11
5.	"Dance of the Ponderous Distaff"	1:29
6.	"We Are Under Attack!!"	2:27
7.	"Carriage Ride"	1:05
8.	"Orphans"	1:47
9.	"The Soldiers of Meryton"	1:10
10.	"Menuet Des Mortes Vivants"	1:35
11.	"Orphan Attack"	3:34
12.	"Don’t Go Into the Woods Alone"	1:29
13.	"St Lazarus"	2:43
14.	"Rosings Park"	1:15
15.	"Midnight Walk"	1:08
16.	"Flirt Lovers Fight"	2:45
17.	"The Letter / Siege of London"	4:09
18.	"The In-Between"	5:36
19.	"Darcy Is Saved"	1:59
20.	"Back to St Lazarus"	2:13
21.	"Zombies Are Fed / Attack / Showdown"	5:13
22.	"After the Explosion"	2:40
23.	"Happy Ending?"	4:42
Total length:		58:06

== Release ==
On March 30, 2015, Screen Gems originally set the film a release date for February 19, 2016. However, on April 22, 2015, Screen Gems moved up the film's release date to February 5, 2016. The film was released by Lionsgate in the UK on February 11, 2016.

=== Marketing ===
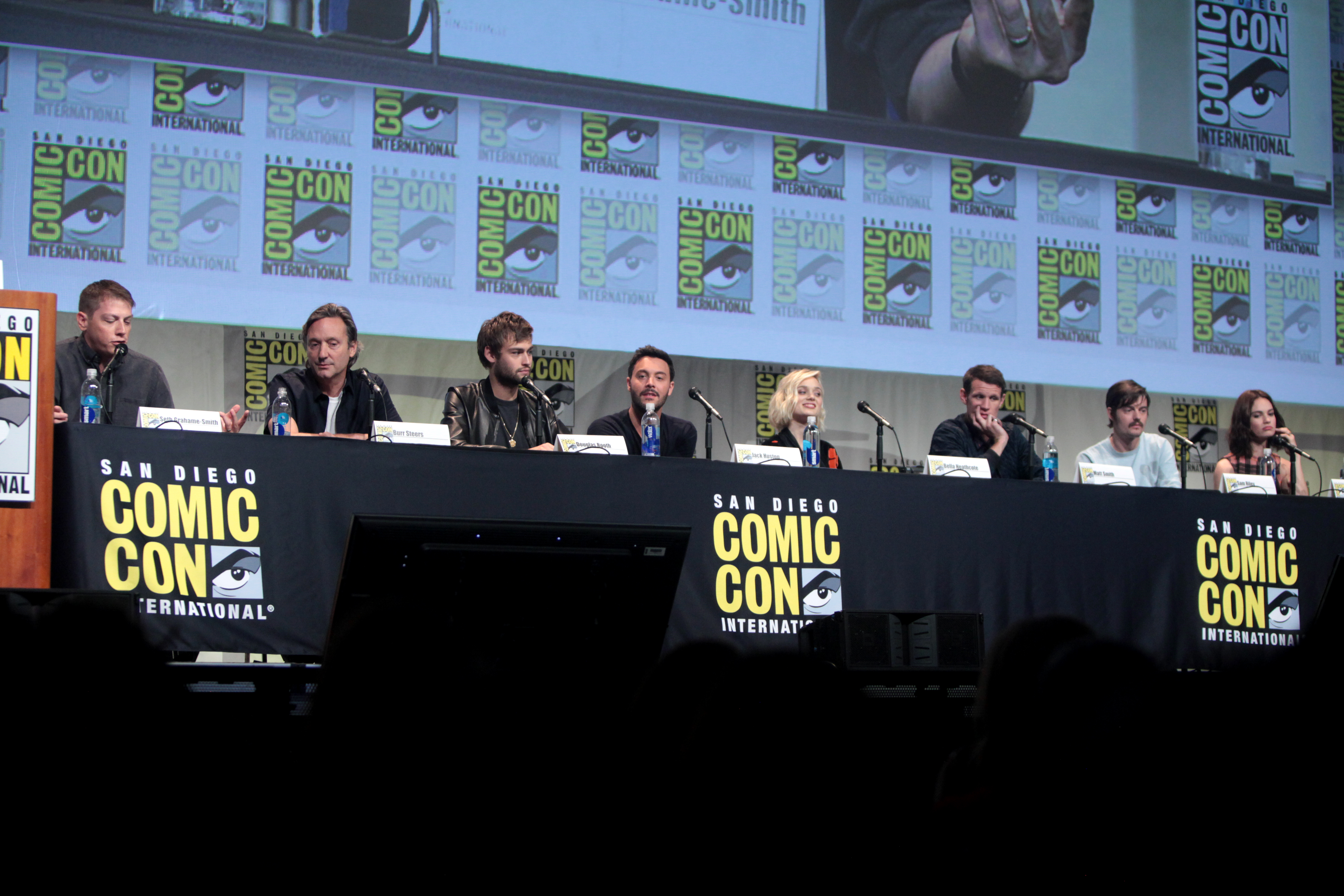
The cast and crew of Pride and Prejudice and Zombies at the 2015 San Diego Comic-Con to promote the film.

In October 2014, Entertainment Weekly published the first photo from the production. In July 2015, Lily James, Sam Riley, Bella Heathcote, Douglas Booth, Jack Huston, Matt Smith, Burr Steers and Seth Grahame-Smith appeared at a panel at Comic-Con to promote the film, where the first trailer debuted. On October 9, 2015, the UK teaser trailer and poster were released. On October 22, 2015, Screen Gems released the first official US trailer and poster. On November 26, 2015, Lionsgate UK released a full-length trailer and the film's first official English poster.

=== Home media ===
Pride and Prejudice and Zombies was released on DVD, Blu-ray, and Ultra HD Blu-ray on May 31, 2016 by Sony Pictures Home Entertainment.

== Reception ==
=== Box office ===
Pride and Prejudice and Zombies grossed $10.9 million in North America and $5.5 million in other territories for a worldwide total of $16.4 million, against a budget of $28 million.

The film was released in North America on February 5, 2016, alongside Hail, Caesar! and The Choice. The film was projected to gross $10-12 million from 2,931 theaters in its opening weekend. It earned $300,000 from previews showing on Thursday night and $5.3 million in its opening weekend, finishing below expectations and 6th at the box office. In its third weekend it was pulled from 2,455 theaters (88%), the third biggest drop in history at the time.

=== Critical response ===
The film received generally mixed reviews from critics, with criticism for the "inconsistent" tone, mediocre action sequences, and unsatisfying plot, though many praised the production values, performances, and humor. The review aggregator website Rotten Tomatoes reported that 47% of critics had given the film a positive review based on 194 reviews, with an average rating of 5.41/10. The site's critics consensus reads: "Pride and Prejudice and Zombies manages to wring a few fun moments out of its premise, but never delivers the thoroughly kooky mashup its title suggests." On Metacritic, the film has a weighted average score of 45 out of 100 based on reviews from 34 critics, indicating "mixed or average reviews". Audiences polled by CinemaScore gave the film an average grade of "B−" on an A+ to F scale.

Rafer Guzmán of Newsday wrote positively about the film, giving the film three out of four stars, calling it "an unexpected and off-kilter treat, thanks to a BBC-quality cast and (un)deadpan humor". Peter Travers of Rolling Stone gave the film 2 out of 4 stars, commenting that "PP&Z is rated PG-13, so the zombie gore is decidedly decorous. But before repetition dulls the party, the movie gets in a few juicy innings." Mick LaSalle of the San Francisco Chronicle gave the film two out of four stars saying "Compared with other Jane Austen movies, it isn't much, but compared with other zombie apocalypse movies, it's an intelligent, literate effort." Jesse Hassenger of The A.V. Club gave the film a C, commenting "That this particular retelling of the Jane Austen novel feels like a Cliffs Notes version is understandable; that its zombie bits are equally rudimentary, though, is more disappointing." Clark Collis of Entertainment Weekly gave the film a B, saying "If more inventive than scary, Pride and Prejudice and Zombies breathes fresh life into the hugely popular, but now desperately predictable, undead genre." Mark Kermode of The Guardian gave the film two out of five stars, saying "Yet torn between Austen and the undead, Steers seems unsure how straight to play either element, blunting comedy, horror and romance alike. The result lacks bite—the one element that zombies and Austen should have in common." Helen O'Hara of The Daily Telegraph also gave two out of five stars, saying "If it had been more elegant in its storytelling, it could have been a fun genre crossover, but the best efforts of Steers and his cast can’t turn the overstuffed book into a film that makes any real sense." Manohla Dargis of The New York Times gave the film a mixed review, saying "Both pride and prejudice still play their parts, but now in service to one tediously repeated joke: the sight of a gentleman or a lady, together or alone, playing cards or ballroom dancing, fatally swarmed by devouring zombies."

Christy Lemire of RogerEbert.com gave the film one and a half out of four stars, saying "Like the novel Pride and Prejudice and Zombies, the movie Pride and Prejudice and Zombies is predicated on a simple, single gimmick: It’s Pride and Prejudice … with zombies. This is a vaguely amusing idea which somehow got stretched out to an entire book, which somehow became a best seller, which inevitably means it had to be made into a film." Keith Uhlich of The Hollywood Reporter gave the film a negative review, calling the film "Lumbering, lifeless and—strange thing to say about a cadaver—almost entirely charmless." Lindsey Bahr of the Associated Press also gave a negative review, saying "This story might have been better suited to a television adaptation. The characters would have been allowed to breathe for a beat in that case. Here, the action and violence take up the space that would have generally been used for character development." Stephen Whitty of New York Daily News gave the film two out of 5 stars, saying "The hungry monsters in Pride and Prejudice and Zombies are looking for nice big brains. Well, they won't find any here." Stephanie Merry of The Washington Post gave the film one and a half stars out of four, commenting ""Pride and Prejudice and Zombies" delivers what its title promises: a little romance and some undead villains, plus a bit of comedy. But this overly busy riff on Austen's winning formula doesn't justify all the tinkering." Britton Peele of The Dallas Morning News gave the film a B−, calling the film "Fun, funny, gory and yet still strangely romantic."

Literary scholar and Austen professor Devoney Looser stated in Entertainment Weekly magazine her opinion that the film's first half, and especially Matt Smith's Mr. Collins, were comic, jarring, and enjoyable. She assessed the film overall with, "I laughed a lot and I shrieked. I was wavering between B+ and A−. I’m willing to bump it up for its originality and live with my grade-inflation reputation: A−." Entertainment Weekly reporter and horror fan Clark Collis did not rate the film quite as high: "I enjoy genre movies that attempt something different - and this does - but I didn't find it all that scary. I'd give it a 'B'".

Rotten Tomatoes lists the film on its 100 Best Zombie Movies, Ranked by Tomatometer.
