= Judy Parfitt =

British actress (born 1935)

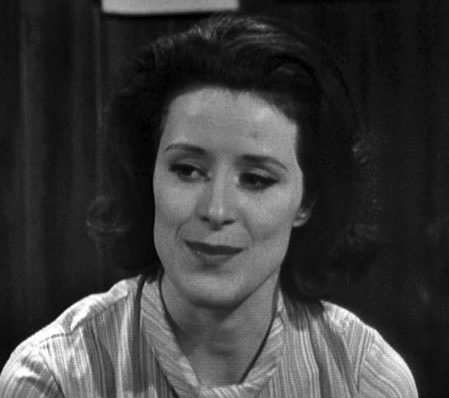
- Parfitt in The Avengers (1968)
- Born: Judy Catherine Claire Parfitt; 7 November 1935 (age 91); Sheffield, Yorkshire, England
- Education: Royal Academy of Dramatic Art
- Occupation: Actress
- Years active: 1954–present
- Spouse: Tony Steedman (m. 1963; died 2001)
- Children: 1

Judy Catherine Claire Parfitt (born 7 November 1935) is an English theatre, film, and television actress. She made her film debut in the 1950s, followed by a supporting role in the BBC television serial David Copperfield (1966). She also appeared as Queen Gertrude in Tony Richardson's 1969 film adaptation of Hamlet.

More notable credits include: Mildred Layton in the 1984 ITV television series The Jewel in the Crown, for which she received her first BAFTA award nomination; Lady Catherine de Bourgh in the 1980 television serial version of Pride and Prejudice; Vera Donovan in the 1995 film adaptation of Stephen King's Dolores Claiborne; and as Maria Thins in the 2003 film Girl with a Pearl Earring, for which she earned another BAFTA award nomination for Best Supporting Actress; and as Sister Monica Joan in the BBC drama series Call the Midwife, (2012-2026).

== Early life ==
Parfitt was born in Sheffield, South Yorkshire in 1935 to Catherine Josephine (née Caulton) and Lawrence Hamilton Parfitt. As a teenager, she attended Notre Dame High School for Girls and later trained at the Royal Academy of Dramatic Art, graduating in 1953.

== Career ==
Parfitt began her career in theatre in 1954, appearing in a production of Fools Rush In at the Amersham Repertory Company.

In 1968, Parfitt appeared in the Hammer television film Journey to The Unknown, opposite Joseph Cotten and hosted by Joan Crawford. In 1978, Parfitt appeared opposite Laurence Olivier, Joan Plowright and Frank Finlay in the episode "Saturday, Sunday, Monday" of Laurence Olivier Presents. In 1981 she created the role of Eleanor in the Royal Shakespeare Company's production of Peter Nichols' Passion Play. In 1984 she played Deidre in Jack Rosenthal's The Chain. In 1987, she appeared in Maurice.

Two of her most notable past roles are Mildred Layton in The Jewel in the Crown (1984), for which she received her first BAFTA nomination, and Lady Catherine de Bourgh in the 1980 TV serial version of Pride and Prejudice. In 1995, she appeared in Dolores Claiborne playing the protagonist's domineering former employer who is dying in present-time, but is seen as a vibrant, glowing woman in flashback sequences.

Parfitt has appeared in some American television shows, beginning with her regular role as Snow White's Stepmother, Evil Queen Lillian "Lily" White in the series The Charmings. Parfitt's real-life husband Tony Steedman guest-starred as Santa Claus in The Charmings' second season Christmas special. She appeared on an episode of Murder, She Wrote in 1989, and as the mother of Dr Elizabeth Corday (played by Alex Kingston) on several episodes of ER in 2002. In 1998, she played the role of Queen Marie in Ever After: A Cinderella Story.

Parfitt played Lady Mount-Temple in the biopic film Wilde, alongside Stephen Fry, Vanessa Redgrave and Gemma Jones in 1997. In 2003, she played Maria Thins in Girl with a Pearl Earring, which earned her a BAFTA nomination for Best Actress in a Supporting Role.

Parfitt played the domineering American dowager, Mrs van Schuyler, opposite David Suchet, James Fox, Frances de la Tour and David Soul in a feature-length episode of Agatha Christie's Poirot in the 2004 edition of Death on the Nile. In 2008, she appeared as the primary villainess in Little Dorrit, as the cruel Mrs Clennam, alongside Alun Armstrong, Sue Johnston and Matthew Macfadyen. At Christmas 2011, she appeared in a small role similar to that which she portrayed in Little Dorrit as Aunt Chastity along with Una Stubbs and Phyllida Law in The Bleak Old Shop of Stuff.

In 2012, Parfitt began appearing in the BBC TV series Call the Midwife as Sister Monica Joan, an elderly nun in early stages of dementia. Sister Monica Joan's strong educational background and knowledge of classical literature are often used in the programme as a way of reflecting on the unfolding drama. Her character died in the season 15 finale, which aired in March 2026 when Parfitt was at the age of 90.

Parfitt has also appeared in BBC's spy tale The Game; a film, Hello Carter; a Radio 4 show, Tom Wrigglesworth's Hang-Ups; and Jessica Hynes's suffragette sitcom Up the Women.

== Personal life ==
In 1963, Parfitt married actor Tony Steedman in Harrow, Middlesex. He died in 2001. The couple had a son.

== Filmography ==
=== Film ===
Year	Title	Role	Notes
1956	A Likely Tale	Ursula Bludgeon	Television film
1964	Hide and Seek	Chauffeur	
1966	David Copperfield	Rosa Dartle	
1967	Angel Pavement	Lilian Matfield	Television film
1969	Hamlet	Queen Gertrude	
1970	The Mind of Mr. Soames	Jenny Bannerman	
1971	Journey to Murder (Do Me a Favor and Kill Me)	Faith Wheeler	Television film
1972	The Edwardians	E. Nesbit	Television miniseries
1974	Alice Through the Looking-Glass	Red Queen	
1974	Galileo	Angelica Sarti	
1979	Secret Orchards	Muriel Perry	Television film
1980	Death of a Princess	Elsa Gruber	
1983	Office Romances	Pam Ivygale	Television film
1983	Champions	Dr. Merrow	
1984	The Chain	Deirdre	
1985	The Covenant	Renata Beck	Television film
1985	Bon Voyage	Lola Widmeyer	Television film, also known as Star Quality: Bon Voyage
1987	Maurice	Mrs. Durham	
1989	Diamond Skulls	Lady Crewne	Also known as Dark Obsession
1989	Getting It Right	Lady Stella Munday	
1991	King Ralph	Queen Katherine	
1993	The Return of the Borrowers	Mrs. Platter	Television film
1995	Dolores Claiborne	Vera Donovan	
1995	Heavy Weather	Lady Constance Keeble	
1996	Element of Doubt	Genevieve	
1996	Goodbye My Love	Ruth	
1996	September	Verena	Television film
1997	Wilde	Lady Mount-Temple	
1998	Ever After	Queen Marie	
2000	Falling Through	Ambassador	
2003	Girl with a Pearl Earring	Maria Thins	Nominated—BAFTA Award for Best Actress in a Supporting Role
2003	Hearts of Gold	Isobel John	Television film
2004	The Aryan Couple	Rachel Krauzenberg	
2005	Asylum	Brenda Raphael	
2008	Dean Spanley	Mrs. Brimley	
2008	My Talks with Dean Spanley	Mrs. Brimley	
2011	The Bleak Old Shop of Stuff	Aunt Chastity	Television film
2011	W.E.	Queen Mary	
2012	The Moth Diaries	Mrs. Rood	
2013	Hello Carter	Aunt Miriam	

=== Television ===
Year	Title	Role	Notes
1962	The Avengers	Miss Ellis	Episode: "Bullseye"
1962	Z-Cars	June Clifford	Episode: "Information Received"
1963	The Odd Man	Lisa Kapp	Episode: "Portrait of Caroline"
1963	The Avengers	Brenda Paterson	Episode: "The White Elephant"
1963	The Sentimental Agent	Sally Clare	Episode: "The Height of Fashion"
1965	Public Eye	Marion Hordern	Episode: "But the Joneses Never Get Letters"
1965	Undermind	Marion Gordon	Episode: “The New Dimension”
1965	Out of the Unknown	Marie	Episode: "Time in Advance"
1965	The Wednesday Play	Dorothy Gorbet	Episode: "Tomorrow, Just You Wait"
1965	Z-Cars	Christina Haines	Episode: "But the Crying..."
1967	The Saint	Anne Liskard	Episode: "The Persistent Patriots"
1967	The Avengers	Vesta	Episode: "Escape in Time"
1967	Adam Adamant Lives!	Ireyna	Episode: "Black Echo"
1967	Les Misérables	Mme. Thenardier	5 episodes
1967	Angel Pavement	Lilian Matfield	4 episodes
1968	Dixon of Dock Green	Mary Dewar	Episode: "The Attack"
1968	The Avengers	Loris	Episode: "Whoever Shot Poor George Oblique Stroke XR40?"
1969	Journey to the Unknown	Faith Wheeler	Episode: "Do Me a Favor and Kill Me"
1970	Villette	Lucy Snowe	5 episodes
1971	Shadows of Fear		Episode: "The Death Watcher"
1973	Play for Today		Episode: "Like the Filmstar"
1973	The Protectors	Lena Hayden	Episode: "Lena"
1974	Shoulder to Shoulder	Lady Constance Lytton	Episode: "Lady Constance Lytton"
1975	Crown Court	Pauline Fanshawe	Episode: "The Healing Hand: Part 1"
1976–82	Crown Court	Gillian Forrest QC	16 episodes
1978	Rumpole of the Bailey	Anna Aspen	Episode: "Rumpole and the Honourable Member"
1978	Laurence Olivier Presents	—N/a	Unknown episodes
1979	Malice Aforethought	Julia Bickleigh	2 episodes
1980	Pride and Prejudice	Lady Catherine de Bourgh	2 episodes
1980	A Tale of Two Cities	Madame Defarge	7 episodes
1981	Yes Minister	Betty Oldham	Episode: "A Question of Loyalty"
1984	The Jewel in the Crown	Mildred Layton	9 episodes Nominated—BAFTA TV Award for Best Actress
1986	Mr Pye	Miss Dredger	4 episodes
1987–88	The Charmings	Queen Lillian White	21 episodes
1989	Murder, She Wrote	Peggy Brooks	Episode: "From Russia...with Blood"
1992	The Blackheath Poisonings	Harriet Collard	3 episodes
1993	The Alleyn Mysteries	Lady O'Callaghan	Episode: "The Nursing Home Murder"
1993	Eye of the Storm	Martha Tabbert	6 episodes
1997	Holding the Baby	Margaret	Episode: "#1.7"
1998	Berkeley Square	Lady Harmonsworth	Episode: "Ladybird, Ladybird"
1999	Midsomer Murders	Angela Wentworth	Episode: "Death's Shadow"
2000, 2001	ER	Isabelle Corday	Episodes: “Abby Road”, “Be Still My Heart” and "April Showers"
2001	Murder in Mind	Margaret Collins	Episode: "Mercy"
2004	Agatha Christie's Poirot	Miss Van Schuyler	Episode: "Death on the Nile"
2004	The Long Firm	Lady Ruth Thursby	Episode: "Teddy's Story"
2005	Funland	Mercy Woolf	11 episodes
2008	Heartbeat	Lady Veronique	Episode: "Danse Macabre"
2008	Little Dorrit	Mrs. Clennam	12 episodes Nominated—Satellite Award for Best Supporting Actress – Series, Miniseries or Television Film
2008	Midsomer Murders	Caroline Halsey	Episode: "Days of Misrule"
2009	Jonathan Creek	Constance Gessler	Episode: "The Grinning Man"
2012–2026	Call the Midwife	Sister Monica Joan	102 episodes Nominated—Satellite Award for Best Supporting Actress – Series, Miniseries or Television Film
2012	The Syndicate	Maureen	Episode: "#1.2"
2012	Vera	Maggie	Episode: "A Certain Samaritan"
2013	Agatha Christie's Marple	Cicely Beauclerk	Episode: "Greenshaw's Folly"
2013	Up the Women	Myrtle	Series regular
2014	The Game	Hester Waterhouse	5 episodes

== Awards and nominations ==
BAFTA Film Awards

- 2003 – Best Actress in a Supporting Role – as Maria Thins in Girl with a Pearl Earring – nominated

BAFTA TV Awards

- 1984 – Best TV Actress – as Mildred Layton in The Jewel in the Crown – nominated

National Television Awards

- 2026 – National Television Award for Drama Performance – as Sister Monica Joan in Call the Midwife – nominated

Other awards

- 2009 – Satellite Award for Best Actress in a Supporting Role in a Series, Mini-Series or Motion Picture Made for Television – as Mrs Clennam in Little Dorrit – nominated
- 2014 – Satellite Award for Best Actress in a Supporting Role in a Series, Mini-Series or Motion Picture Made for Television – as Sister Monica Joan in Call the Midwife – nominated

== Works cited ==
- Cotter, Robert Michael Bobb (2013). The Women of Hammer Horror: A Biographical Dictionary and Filmography. McFarland. ISBN 978-0-7864-7208-6.
