= Lady Catherine de Bourgh =

Austen character

- Pride and Prejudice character
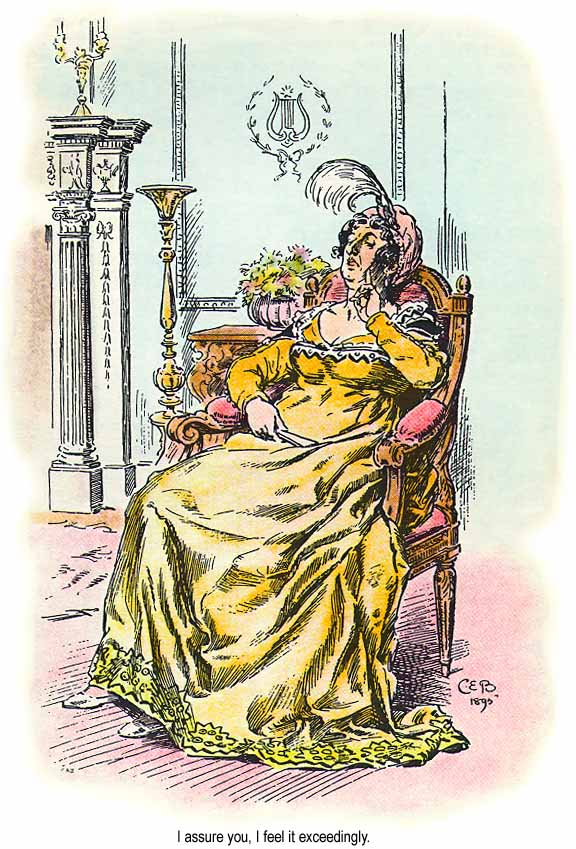
- Illustration by C. E. Brock
- Created by: Jane Austen

In-universe information
- Gender: Female
- Title: Lady
- Class: Gentry
- Spouse: Sir Lewis de Bourgh (deceased)
- Children: Anne de Bourgh
- Relatives: Unnamed Earl (brother); Lady Anne Darcy (sister; deceased); Colonel Fitzwilliam (nephew); Fitzwilliam Darcy (nephew); Georgiana Darcy (niece); Old Mr Darcy (brother-in-law); Elizabeth Bennet (niece-in-law)
- Religion: Church of England
- Home: Rosings Park, in the village of Rosings, town of Hunsford, Kent
- Nationality: English

Lady Catherine de Bourgh (/dəˈbɜːr/ də-BUR; née Fitzwilliam) is a character in the 1813 novel Pride and Prejudice by Jane Austen. Lady Catherine can be seen as a foil to the novel's protagonist Elizabeth Bennet.

== Family ==
Character genealogy

Mr Hurst
Louisa Hurst
Mr Philips
Caroline Bingley
Mrs Philips
Mr Charles Bingley
Mrs Gardiner
Jane Bennet
Mr Edward Gardiner
Elizabeth Bennet
Mrs Bennet
Mary Bennet
Mr Bennet
Catherine "Kitty" Bennet
Mr William Collins
Lydia Bennet
Charlotte Lucas
Mr George Wickham
(Old) Mr Darcy	Mr Fitzwilliam Darcy
Lady Anne Darcy	Georgiana Darcy
Lady Catherine de Bourgh	Anne de Bourgh
Earl _____________	Colonel Fitzwilliam

Lady Catherine was the sister of Lady Anne Darcy, mother of Mr Fitzwilliam Darcy and Georgiana Darcy. The sisters were the daughters of an earl and their brother is the sitting earl during the events of the novel. Thus she and her sister are always styled as Lady Catherine and Lady Anne, as their marriages to a knight and an untitled man, respectively, do not confer upon them a preferable style.

Lady Catherine is the widow of Sir Lewis de Bourgh. If she were not entitled to the courtesy style of an earl's daughter, she would be styled as Lady de Bourgh. The couple had a single daughter, Anne de Bourgh, who is her father's heiress; and so inheritor of Rosings Park, which is not entailed in the male line. Lady Catherine desired to marry her daughter to Mr Darcy.

At the end of the novel, Lady Catherine becomes the aunt-in-law of Elizabeth Bennet after Elizabeth marries Mr Darcy. She considers that Mr Darcy is marrying someone much below him.

== Behaviour ==
In her visit to Hunsford, Elizabeth is able to see how Lady Catherine de Bourgh and Mr Collins behave together, and is shocked. "Elizabeth soon perceived, that though this great lady was not in the commission of the peace for the county, she was a most active magistrate in her own parish, the minutest concerns of which were carried to her by Mr Collins; and whenever any of the cottagers were disposed to be quarrelsome, discontented, or too poor, she sallied forth into the village to settle their differences, silence their complaints, and scold them into harmony and plenty." Meddling in the business of the Overseers of the Poor and the Justices of the Peace are actions of gross impropriety on Lady Catherine's part, and Mr Collins's facilitating these actions through relating to her information given to him by parishioners in confidence amounted to a serious betrayal of trust. Subsequently, of course, Mr Collins will similarly abuse information given in confidence, in sharing with Lady Catherine the contents of a letter received by Charlotte. Lady Catherine will compound the offence by confronting Elizabeth with its revelation of the "patched-up business at the expense of your father and uncles" by which Wickham had been persuaded to make an honest woman of Lydia, though Lady Catherine was not to know that Elizabeth knew this (and more) from Aunt Gardiner already. Elizabeth sees Lady Catherine as a bully, a hypocrite and a gross abuser of trust - both of her immediate family and of those unfortunate enough to be within her power.

== Rosings Park ==
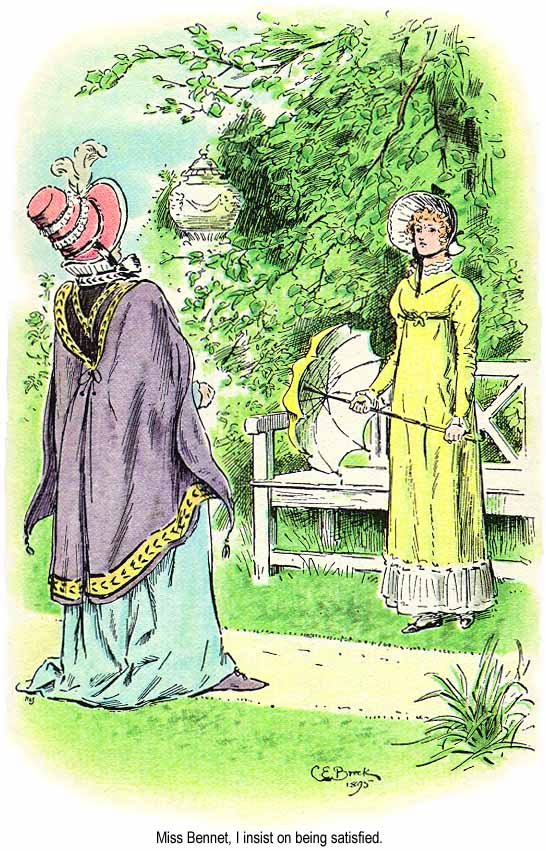
Lady Catherine and Elizabeth in Hertfordshire by C. E. Brock, 1895

Rosings is the residence of Lady Catherine de Bourgh; although, as heiress of Sir Lewis her daughter Anne de Bourgh is strictly its sole owner, and likely tenant in possession under an entail. Mr Collins had put it succinctly: "“She has one only daughter, the heiress of Rosings, and of very extensive property”. Talking to Elizabeth, Lady Catherine had stated that Rosings was not entailed away from the female line, "it was not thought necessary in Sir Lewis de Bourgh's family", but this statement prompts the likelihood that the estate nevertheless had been entailed by strict settlement in the de Bourgh family to the direct descendants of an ancient forbear, not specifying male or female.

Rosings Park, rebuilt anew by Sir Lewis, is noted many times within the novel as a luxurious house with many fine fittings. One such feature is a chimney piece in the second drawing room that is worth £800, as Mr Collins proudly states, with the implication that Lady Catherine is responsible for its purchase. Austen contrasts Lady Catherine's repeated (and unjustified) criticism of Charlotte Collins's household arrangements with her own extravagant misuse of the de Bourgh family estate, of which she is merely a dowager and trustee. Should Anne die unmarried, as was looking increasingly likely, Rosings might presumably pass to another branch of the de Bourgh family under an entail, and Lady Catherine could then be homeless.

Social life among the country gentry consisted primarily of a daily round of calls, introductions, invitations and entertaining; and Lady Catherine drives out frequently on visits. But return calls to Rosings are strangely rare. Mr Collins and Charlotte regularly dine; but otherwise, the only guests noted as attending over the whole six-week Easter period in the novel are Charlotte's friends and relatives from Hertfordshire, and Lady Catherine's relatives from Derbyshire. No other local gentry families apparently cross Lady Catherine's threshold; nor over this period, do any de Bourgh relations.

== Depictions in film and television ==
=== Film ===
Year	Actress	Role	Film
1940	Edna May Oliver	Lady Catherine de Bourgh	Pride and Prejudice
2004	Marsha Mason	Catherine Darcy	Bride and Prejudice
2005	Judi Dench	Lady Catherine de Bourgh	Pride and Prejudice
2011	Cynthia Sharp	Mrs. de Bourgh	A Modern Pride and Prejudice
2016	Lena Headey	Lady Catherine de Bourgh	Pride and Prejudice and Zombies

=== Television ===
Year	Actress	Role	Film
1938	Dorothy Green	Lady Catherine de Bourgh	Pride and Prejudice
1952	Helen Haye	Lady Catherine de Bourgh	Pride and Prejudice
1958	Phyllis Neilson-Terry	Lady Catherine de Bourgh	Pride and Prejudice
1961	Loudi Nijhoff	Lady Catherine de Bourgh	De vier dochters Bennet
1967	Sylvia Coleridge	Lady Catherine de Bourgh	Pride and Prejudice
1980	Judy Parfitt	Lady Catherine de Bourgh	Pride and Prejudice
1995	Barbara Leigh-Hunt	Lady Catherine de Bourgh	Pride and Prejudice
2008	Lindsay Duncan	Lady Catherine de Bourgh	Lost in Austen
2013	Penelope Keith	Lady Catherine de Bourgh	Death Comes to Pemberley
2018	Natália do Vale	Lady Margareth	Orgulho e Paixão
TBA	Fiona Shaw	Lady Catherine de Bourgh	Pride and Prejudice

=== Audio ===
Year	Actress	Role	Television programme	Notes
2025	Glenn Close	Lady Catherine de Bourgh	Pride and Prejudice	An adaptation on Audible
