= Helen Jerome =

Writer (b. 1883, d. 1966)

Helen Jerome (1878–1966) was a British-Australian (naturalised U.S. citizen) journalist, author and playwright most famous for her adaptation of the Jane Austen novel, Pride and Prejudice, for the stage. She is credited with having created the first heartthrob, desire-filled version of Austen's hero, Mr Darcy.

== Early life ==
Helen Jerome (born Helene Ursula Bruton) (10 May 1878 – 1966) was the daughter of William Bruton, born in Clonmel, County Tipperary, Ireland, who arrived in Sydney aged 19 with his parents and two younger siblings on 1 August 1863 as assisted passengers on board the John Temperley. Nine of William and his wife Mary's ten children survived into adulthood and were raised Catholic. In Sydney, Australia William Bruton became a civil servant with the New South Wales postal department. William Bruton's sister was Mother Mary Cecelia (Ellen) Bruton, who was the Foundress of the Sacred Heart Hospice in Darlinghurst, Sydney, and a member of the Sisters of Charity for 53 years. One of Helen's brothers, William Joseph Bruton, would become a solicitor and also publish pieces in The Bulletin magazine.

Helen took up writing, contributing poems and articles to the Catholic Freeman's Journal in Sydney and The Bulletin in the 1890s. She married Armand Jerome, a publisher in Sydney, in June 1900. They travelled to Paris on their honeymoon, and Helen submitted travel stories for Australian newspapers while overseas. They had one child, Carmen. Helen continued to write, under her new name, for The Worker, The Age and other newspapers, in Australia and overseas, writing travel pieces, poems and other news items. She travelled widely to Japan, Russia, the United States and Europe. Armand Jerome died in 1924.

By 1923, Helen Jerome had moved permanently to the United States and published a book, The Secret of Woman in New York. Her daughter Carmen attended university in the U.S. and married Marc Matson of Washington, D.C. Jerome moved into songwriting and adapting novels for the stage in the 1930s. She wrote the book of the play Pride and Prejudice: a sentimental comedy in 1935 and Jane Eyre: a drama of passions in three acts in 1936. The former was produced successfully for the stage in the U.S. and England. Jane Eyre was also successfully staged. Tufts University honoured Jerome with a Master of Arts degree in 1937. Jerome also worked on other adaptations.

Jerome became a naturalised U.S. citizen in 1940. She was married to George D. Ali, an oil company executive, until he died in 1942.

Jerome alternated between living in both Britain and the United States. She died in England in 1966.

== Legacy ==
Jerome's stage adaptation of Pride and Prejudice led to the successful film version of the book in 1940, directed by Robert Zigler Leonard. Her adaptation of the novel fleshed out the character of Elizabeth's suitor Mr Darcy, providing notes to assist the actors and alert the audience to the attraction between the two characters.
