= Shrinks (TV series) =

British television series

- Genre: Drama
- Starring: Bill Paterson; Simon Jones; Elizabeth Garvie; Brian Protheroe
- Composer: Debbie Wiseman
- Country of origin: United Kingdom
- Original language: English
- No. of series: 1
- No. of episodes: 7

Production
- Executive producer: John Hambley
- Producer: Jacky Stoller
- Running time: 75 minutes (x1); 50 minutes (x6)
- Production company: Euston Films for Thames Television

Original release
- Network: ITV
- Release: 13 February – 25 March 1991

Shrinks is a British seven-part television drama series about a group of upmarket London psychiatrists produced for Thames Television by its subsidiary company Euston Films for the ITV network, and that originally aired between 13 February and 25 March 1991.

== Cast ==
- Bill Paterson as Matt Hennessey
- Simon Jones as Jack Cavendish
- Elizabeth Garvie as Beth Myers
- Brian Protheroe as Leo Brompton
- Patricia Kerrigan as Win Bargate
- Diane Bull as Kate Hennessey
- Pauline Black as Lexie
- Mary Maddox as Alison Brompton
- Yvonne Bryceland as Magda Myers
- Jeananne Crowley as Rosie
- Alison Rose as Roberta
- Jane Booker as Pauline Trenchard
- Mary Woodvine as Sarah Neale
- Lucinda Curtis as Libby
- Frankie Jordan as Glenda
- Benedick Blythe as David
- Jennie Stoller as Rachel

== Episodes ==
No.	Title	Directed by	Written by	Original release date
1	"Episode 1"	Stuart Orme	Stephen Lavell & Lester Hollamby	13 February 1991
Special feature length episode introducing the characters who work at the Maximillian Clinic.
2	"Episode 2"	Colin Gregg	Jonathan Rich	18 February 1991
Lexie has to deal with a severe case of claustrophobia and the 'Women Who Love Too Much' group meets for the first time.
3	"Episode 3"	Colin Gregg	Jonathan Rich	25 February 1991
Jack decides that Leo, who is too finding it hard to cope with the demands of his TV show, a peer of the realm and a novelist with writer's block, is setting a bad example.
4	"Episode 4"	Pedr James	Richard O'Keefe	4 March 1991
Jack has to deal with a friend who is taking risks to the point of obsession.
5	"Episode 5"	Michael Winterbottom	Jonathan Rich & Richard O'Keefe	11 March 1991
Leo deals with a man with a Casanova complex, and Magda deals with an elderly film star.
6	"Episode 6"	Colin Gregg	Jonathan Rich	18 March 1991
Scott Kaufman alarms the team at the Max by trying to re-organise it all.
7	"Episode 7"	Colin Gregg	Jonathan Rich	25 March 1991
The cases in this edition include a police motor cyclist behaving oddly and a fashion photographer haunted by the image of his favourite model.
