= Pride and Prejudice (1940 film) =

1940 film by Robert Zigler Leonard

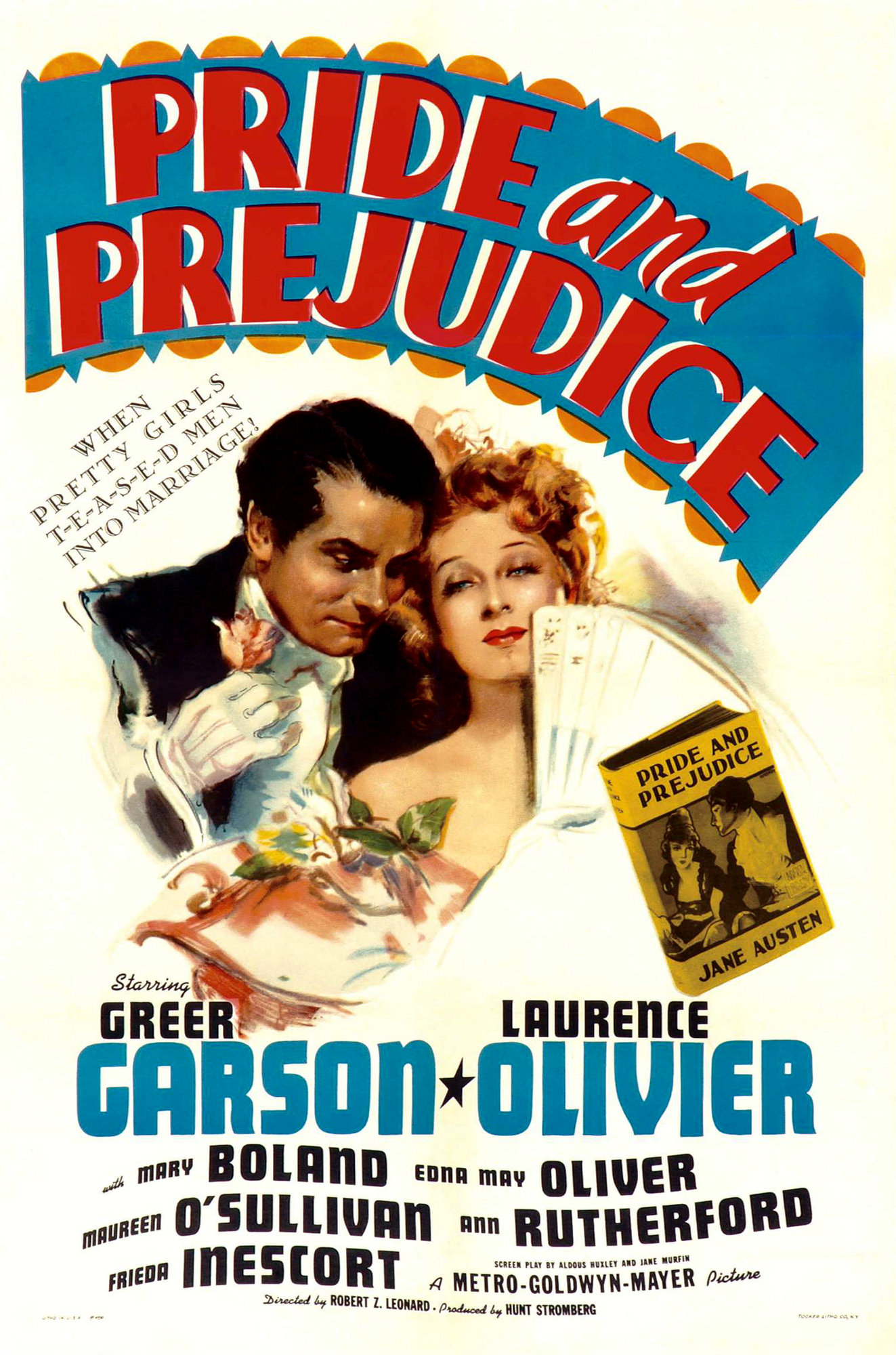
- Theatrical release poster
- Directed by: Robert Z. Leonard
- Written by: Helen Jerome (dramatization)
- Screenplay by: Aldous Huxley; Jane Murfin
- Based on: Pride and Prejudice; 1813 novel by Jane Austen
- Produced by: Hunt Stromberg
- Starring: Greer Garson; Laurence Olivier; Mary Boland; Edna May Oliver; Maureen O'Sullivan; Ann Rutherford; Frieda Inescort
- Cinematography: Karl Freund
- Edited by: Robert Kern
- Music by: Herbert Stothart
- Production company: Metro-Goldwyn-Mayer
- Distributed by: Loew's Inc.
- Release date: July 25, 1940 (Detroit)
- Running time: 117 minutes
- Country: United States
- Language: English
- Budget: $1,437,000
- Box office: $1.8 million

Pride and Prejudice is a 1940 American romance film adaptation of Jane Austen's 1813 novel Pride and Prejudice, starring Greer Garson and Laurence Olivier. Directed by Robert Z. Leonard, the screenplay was written by Aldous Huxley and Jane Murfin, adapted specifically from the stage adaptation by Helen Jerome, in addition to Jane Austen's novel.

The story is about five sisters from an English family of landed gentry who must deal with issues of marriage, morality and misconceptions.

The film was released on July 26, 1940 in the United States by MGM and was critically well received. The New York Times film critic praised the film as "the most deliciously pert comedy of old manners, the most crisp and crackling satire in costume that we in this corner can remember ever having seen on the screen."

== Plot ==
Mrs. Bennet and her two eldest daughters, Jane and Elizabeth, are shopping for new dresses when they notice two gentlemen and a lady arriving outside, exiting from a very expensive carriage. They learn that the men are Mr. Bingley, who has just rented the local estate of Netherfield, and Mr. Darcy, both wealthy eligible bachelors, which excites Mrs. Bennet's interest. Collecting her other daughters, Mrs. Bennet returns home, where she tries to convince Mr. Bennet to visit Mr. Bingley, but he declines, explaining to her minutes later that he has already made his acquaintance.

At the next ball, Elizabeth sees how proud Darcy is when she overhears him refusing to dance with her. Elizabeth also meets Mr. Wickham, who tells her how Darcy did him a terrible wrong. When Darcy does ask Elizabeth to dance with him, she refuses, but when Wickham asks her in front of Darcy, she accepts.

The Bennets' cousin, Mr. Collins, who will inherit the Bennet estate upon the death of Mr. Bennet, arrives looking for a wife, and decides that Elizabeth will be suitable. Invited to a garden party by Charles Bingley at Netherfield Park, Collins keeps following Elizabeth around, who tries her best to avoid him, as he won't leave her alone. Darcy aids her and directs Collins away. Elizabeth surprisingly outshoots Darcy in archery; later he escorts her to the dance floor, but after seeing questionable behavior of her mother and younger sisters, he leaves her again, making Elizabeth angry with him once more. The next day, Mr. Collins asks her to marry him, but she refuses his persistent proposals. Later, Collins becomes engaged to Elizabeth's best friend, Charlotte Lucas.

Elizabeth visits Charlotte in her new home. She is introduced to Lady Catherine de Bourgh, Mr. Collins' "patroness", and during her visit she also encounters Mr. Darcy once again. At Charlotte's insistence, Elizabeth sees Darcy who asks her to marry him, but she refuses, partly because of the story Wickham had told her about Darcy, partly because he broke up the romance between Mr. Bingley and Jane, and partly because of his "character". They get into a heated argument and he leaves.

When Elizabeth returns home, she learns that Lydia has run away with Wickham but they were not married. Mr. Bennet and his brother-in-law unsuccessfully try to find Lydia. Darcy learns of this and returns to offer Elizabeth his services. He tells her that Wickham will never marry Lydia. He reveals that Wickham had tried to elope with his sister, Georgiana, who was younger than Lydia at the time. After Darcy leaves, Elizabeth realizes she loves him but believes he will never see her again.

Lydia and Wickham return to the house married. A short time later, Lady Catherine arrives and tells Elizabeth that Darcy found Lydia and forced Wickham to marry her by providing Wickham with a substantial sum of money. She also tells her that she can strip Darcy of his wealth if he marries against her wishes. She demands that Elizabeth promise that she will never become engaged to Darcy. Elizabeth refuses. Lady Catherine leaves in a huff and meets outside with Darcy, who had sent her to see Elizabeth to find out if he would be welcomed by her. After Lady Catherine's report, Darcy comes in and he and Elizabeth proclaim their love for each other in the garden. Mr. Bingley also meets Jane in the garden and takes her hand, all while Mrs. Bennet spies on both couples.

== Cast ==
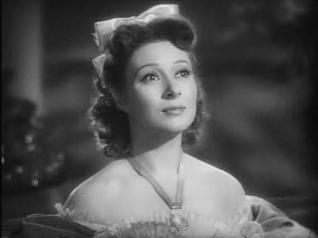
Garson as Elizabeth Bennet

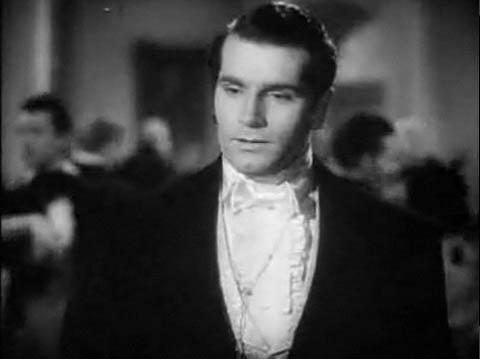
Olivier as Mr. Darcy

- Greer Garson as Elizabeth Bennet
- Laurence Olivier as Mr. Darcy
- Mary Boland as Mrs. Bennet
- Edna May Oliver as Lady Catherine de Bourgh
- Maureen O'Sullivan as Jane Bennet
- Ann Rutherford as Lydia Bennet
- Frieda Inescort as Miss Bingley
- Edmund Gwenn as Mr. Bennet
- Karen Morley as Mrs. Collins
- Heather Angel as Kitty Bennet
- Melville Cooper as Mr. Collins
- Edward Ashley as Mr. Wickham
- Marten Lamont as Mr. Denny
- E. E. Clive as Sir William Lucas
- Marjorie Wood as Lady Lucas
- May Beatty as Mrs. Philips
- Marsha Hunt as Mary Bennet
- Bruce Lester as Mr. Bingley
- Gia Kent as Anne de Bourgh
- Vernon Downing as Captain Carter
- Elspeth Dudgeon as Mrs. King

== Production ==
Filming was originally scheduled to start in October 1936 under Irving Thalberg's supervision, with Clark Gable and Norma Shearer in the leading roles, but pre-production activity was suspended following Thalberg's death on September 13, 1936. In August 1939, MGM had selected George Cukor to direct the film, with Robert Donat now cast opposite Shearer. The studio considered filming in England, but these plans were changed at the start of the war in Europe in September 1939, which caused the closure of MGM's English operations. Cukor was eventually replaced by Robert Z. Leonard due to a scheduling conflict.

The Motion Picture Production Code prompted some changes in the film as well. Because Mr. Collins, a ridiculous clergyman in the novel, could not seem to criticize men of the cloth, the character was changed to a librarian. Some scenes were altered significantly. For example, Mr. Wickham was introduced at the beginning of the movie. The archery scene was a figment of the filmmakers’ imagination. In the confrontation between Lady Catherine de Bourgh and Elizabeth Bennet, near the film's end, the former's haughty demand that Elizabeth promise never to marry Darcy was changed to a hoax to test the mettle and sincerity of Elizabeth's love. (In the novel, the confrontation is an authentic demand, motivated by Lady Catherine's snobbery and her ardent desire that Darcy marry her own daughter.)

== Reception ==
According to MGM records, the film earned $1,849,000, resulting in a loss of $241,000, despite the fact that its budget was $1,437,000.

The film was critically well received. When it premiered at Radio City Music Hall, Bosley Crowther, reviewing for The New York Times, described it as "the most deliciously pert comedy of old manners, the most crisp and crackling satire in costume that we in this corner can remember ever having seen on the screen." He also praised the casting, and noted of the two central protagonists:

Greer Garson is Elizabeth—'dear, beautiful Lizzie'—stepped right out of the book, or rather out of one's fondest imagination: poised, graceful, self-contained, witty, spasmodically stubborn and as lovely as a woman can be. Laurence Olivier is Darcy, that's all there is to it—the arrogant, sardonic Darcy whose pride went before a most felicitous fall.

In the 21st century, TV Guide called the film "an unusually successful adaptation of Jane Austen's most famous novel... Although the satire is slightly reduced and coarsened and the period advanced in order to use more flamboyant costumes, the spirit is entirely in keeping with Austen's sharp, witty portrait of rural 19th century social mores." It continued:

Garson never did anything better than her Elizabeth Bennet. Genteel but not precious, witty yet not forced, spirited but never vulgar, Garson's Elizabeth is an Austen heroine incarnate. Olivier, too, has rarely been better in a part requiring the passion of his Heathcliff from Wuthering Heights but strapping it into the straitjacket of snobbery.

The review aggregator website Rotten Tomatoes reported that 100% of critics have given the film a positive review based on 10 reviews, with an average rating of 7.58/10.

== Awards ==
Pride and Prejudice received an Academy Award for Best Art Direction, Black and White (Cedric Gibbons and Paul Groesse).
