= Lost in Austen =

2008 British television fantasy series

- Lost in Austen intertitle
- Genre: Comedy-drama; Fantasy; Romance
- Written by: Guy Andrews
- Directed by: Dan Zeff
- Starring: Jemima Rooper; Alex Kingston; Hugh Bonneville; Morven Christie; Elliot Cowan; Gemma Arterton
- Music by: Christian Henson
- Country of origin: United Kingdom
- Original language: English
- No. of series: 1
- No. of episodes: 4

Production
- Executive producers: Guy Andrews; Michele Buck; Damien Timmer
- Producers: Kate McKerrell; Vinit Kulkarni
- Running time: 45 mins.
- Production company: Mammoth Screen Ltd

Original release
- Network: ITV
- Release: 3 September – 24 September 2008

Lost in Austen is a four-part 2008 British television series for the ITV network, written by Guy Andrews as a fantasy adaptation of the 1813 novel Pride and Prejudice by Jane Austen. Amanda, a young woman living in modern London, enters the plot of the novel through a portal in her bathroom, to join the Bennet family and affect events, generally disastrously.

In December 2009 the show was placed at 48 in "The Top 50 TV Shows of the Noughties", a list published in The Times.

== Plot ==
=== Episode 1 ===
Amanda Price, a keen Jane Austen fan from present-day Hammersmith, who has just rejected an unromantic marriage proposal from her boozy boyfriend, discovers Elizabeth Bennet, a character from Pride and Prejudice, standing in a nightgown in her bathroom. When Elizabeth disappears, Amanda brushes the incident off as a dream. She explains to her mother that Jane Austen's novel has shown her that she can set higher standards for a husband for herself and has taught her to believe in true love. Elizabeth appears in Amanda's bathroom again, this time dressed for travel.

Amanda steps through the secret doorway in the wall that Elizabeth has shown her, and finds herself at Longbourn, the home of the Bennet family in Hertfordshire, near the beginning of the novel. Amanda is trapped in this world, while Elizabeth is in 21st-century London. Mr Bennet is hospitable, accepting Amanda as his daughter's good friend, while Elizabeth is off visiting "the city".

Amanda tries to ensure that the novel progresses as it should, but when Mr Bingley, newly settled in Netherfield, visits Longbourn, he admires Amanda more than Jane Bennet. At the Meryton Assembly Hall, Amanda tries to reject Bingley's interest by telling him that she cannot dance with him, because Mr Darcy has already asked her to dance. Bingley calls Amanda's bluff, but Darcy coldly lies and confirms Amanda's claim. As Darcy dances with her, Amanda asks why he covered for her, for which he scolds her, believing her to have tried to make a fool out of Bingley, and agreed to dance through wanting to spare him from embarrassment. Amanda gets drunk and kisses Bingley, immediately regretting it.

A furious Mrs Bennet warns Amanda not to interfere with her daughters' marriage prospects. Later, Amanda forces Jane to travel to the Bingleys' home in bad weather, in order to get the novel back on track. But when she learns that this may give Jane a fatal attack of influenza, Amanda follows her to try and save her.

=== Episode 2 ===
While nursing a sick Jane with the then-unknown drug paracetamol at Netherfield Park, Amanda finally puts a stop to Bingley's advances to her. Claiming to be a lesbian, she is able to direct his amorous attentions back to Jane. Darcy, however, argues with Amanda about her bringing Jane to Netherfield Park, while Bingley's sister Caroline takes a dislike to Amanda, seeing her as a potential rival for Darcy, and continually tries to embarrass her. She insists that Amanda play the piano for them, but upon her revelation that she cannot play, Amanda instead sings Petula Clark's song "Downtown" and receives great applause from Darcy and Bingley. Caroline snidely tells Amanda that she will never get the riches she's looking for, but she at least won't starve. Amanda, in retaliation, boasts of her income of 27,000 pounds a year, which is enormous by Georgian standards, and much larger than Darcy's income.

As the Bennet ladies return to Longbourn, their carriage breaks down, but an army officer, George Wickham, plays gallant rescuer. Amanda warns Wickham (who, in the novel, will later run away with Lydia) that she knows what he is up to and is watching him.

Repulsive cousin Mr Collins, a cleric and the heir presumptive to Longbourn under the entail, visits Longbourn to gain a wife, much to the excitement of Mrs Bennet. When he starts a proposal to Jane, Amanda intervenes, offering Elizabeth's best friend (and his fiancée later in the novel), Charlotte Lucas. Mr Collins, however, misunderstands, and proposes to Amanda. She accepts in order to save Jane.

Amanda sends Bingley and Jane on a walk to push them together. When Bingley consents to host a ball, Amanda hopes that events have returned to coincide with the novel. However, at the ball Darcy convinces Bingley not to marry Jane, telling him that her family, influenced by Amanda, are only after his money. Bingley gives Jane the cold shoulder, and she flees in tears.

A mischievous Wickham begins to discredit Amanda, spreading rumours that her vast income comes from her deceased father, a fishmonger. Mr Collins, on hearing of this, breaks off his engagement with Amanda, and she knees him in the groin.

Jane, believing that Bingley no longer loves her, accepts her mother's advice and unhappily marries Mr Collins. Charlotte leaves for Africa. A disgusted Mr Bennet angrily refuses to sleep in the same bed as his wife, believing that she has condemned Jane.

Amanda questions Bingley, who reveals that he does love Jane, but Darcy's stronger will has prevailed over his own. Amanda accuses Darcy of crushing his friend's chance for happiness. She now decides that he does not deserve Elizabeth. Darcy retorts that Amanda repels him, and he walks out.

=== Episode 3 ===
Mrs Bennet finally ejects Amanda from Longbourn for trying to meddle with her daughters' marriage prospects. A sympathetic Mr Bennet gives Amanda some money and advises her to reconcile with Jane. Mr Collins explains to his miserable new wife that he has not yet sought to consummate their marriage because of religious abstinence.

Wickham offers to help Amanda and teaches her how to properly act in upper-class society. He buys her a dress, shows her how to use a fan to hide her true emotions, and invents fictional French nobles for her to name-drop. Amanda realises that Wickham wants to set her up with Darcy so that he can pursue Caroline Bingley, who is believed to be Darcy's ideal social match.

Wickham encourages Amanda to visit Jane, and, though at first reluctant, Jane gratefully accepts Amanda's apology and offer to renew their friendship. Mr Collins refuses to allow Amanda to dinner at Rosings, the home of his patroness Lady Catherine de Bourgh, but Amanda claims to have a message from her fictional noble relations. Lady Catherine, not wanting to appear ignorant and unconnected, goes along with the ploy, pretending to know the relations, and allows Amanda to dine with them.

Lady Catherine is also the aunt of Mr Darcy, and Darcy, Bingley, and Caroline are among her dinner guests. Darcy tries to put Amanda down, but she twistedly agrees with everything he says, wields her fan, and manages to fit in.

Meanwhile, Mrs Bennet argues with Mr Bennet, and decides to see Jane, taking Lydia with her so that she can see a happy marriage. Mr Bennet claims that if she finds a happy marriage at Rosings, he will walk the drawing room naked.

Lady Catherine mentions that she wishes the rest of the Bennet girls to marry Mr Collins's brothers, who are less "favoured" than himself. Despite their disagreements over dinner, Darcy begins to soften towards Amanda when she returns a gold watch that a sad and drunken Bingley wagers and loses at cards. Lady Catherine warns Amanda to stay away from Darcy. Amanda insists that she does not want him, but Lady Catherine disagrees.

Agitated, Darcy comes to see Amanda at the parsonage. He asks her why she sought him out at Rosings, and Amanda denies this, pointing out that he has come to see her. A tormented Darcy, struggling to understand why he is drawn to Amanda, sweeps her up into his arms. A shocked Amanda asks him if he knows what he is doing, and he storms out. Jane witnesses their exchange. She states that Darcy is in love with Amanda, but Amanda insists that Elizabeth is the one for Darcy. Jane tries to convince her otherwise.

Later, Darcy invites Amanda to visit Pemberley, his estate in Derbyshire. Overhearing the invitation, Mrs Bennet misunderstands the invitation as intended for her as well and eagerly accepts, and Darcy politely includes Lydia and Jane. At a shooting party, Jane tearfully pleads with the sinking Bingley to fulfil his moral duty to marry and be happy for them both. Mrs Bennet witnesses this, and finally understands what her husband was talking about.

Amanda admits to herself that she loves Darcy and decides to be an "understudy" while Elizabeth is away. She tells a weeping Mrs Bennet that she will marry Darcy in order to buy Longbourn for them, freeing them from the influence of Mr Collins.

Bingley then seeks out Wickham as a drinking companion, and Wickham eventually returns the unconscious Bingley to Pemberley. At Wickham's arrival, Darcy confines his young sister Georgiana, who has a history with Wickham, to her room. However, Georgiana confesses to Amanda that Wickham did not seduce her, as she reported to her brother. She was angry when Wickham rejected her advances and called her a child. Wickham maintains the falsehood to spare Georgiana's honour, being sure that Darcy would throw her out if he knew the truth. Amanda realises that Wickham is a good person, and that Austen's account of him was one-sided.

Drunk and despairing, Bingley punches Darcy for leading him away from Jane. Caroline, seeing her opportunity, walks up to Darcy, and makes coded insinuations about Amanda.

When Amanda finally confesses her love to Darcy, she inadvertently mentions her old boyfriend back in the present, confirming what Caroline had implied to Darcy: Amanda is not a virgin. Darcy, although still obviously in love, regrets that he cannot marry her because of his station in society.

A distraught Amanda furiously rips up her copy of Pride and Prejudice and throws it out of a window. While she packs to leave, however, Caroline enters her room, and Amanda is stunned when Caroline makes advances, having heard from her brother that Amanda is a secret lesbian, like her. Caroline in fact only wishes to marry Darcy to fulfill social expectations.

Amanda finds Darcy in the garden, reading the tattered remains of her copy of the novel. He assumes that she is its author and expresses his shock that she has exposed private matters, not even concealing the real names of the characters. Amanda angrily tells him that his view of everything is wrong, that he has misjudged everyone, and announces her immediate departure.

=== Episode 4 ===
Darcy announces his expected engagement to Caroline, and Mrs Bennet receives a note telling of Lydia's elopement with, not Wickham, but Bingley. Mrs Bennet blames Amanda for this, while Amanda blames Darcy, and says that he and Caroline deserve each other.

Amanda travels with Mr and Mrs Bennet in pursuit of Lydia and Bingley, and, with help from Wickham, they find them hiding at an inn in then-rural Hammersmith. Darcy arrives too. Lydia and Bingley insist that nothing has happened between them, but an enraged Mr Bennet attacks Bingley with a sword. In self-defence, Bingley inflicts a serious head injury on the older man.

Amanda fears for Mr Bennet's life. Needing Elizabeth, she breaks through a door, and suddenly finds herself back in modern London. Her boyfriend Michael drives her to see Elizabeth, who is now employed as a nanny.

On a busy street, Amanda spots an astonished Darcy in the crowd. He explains that he has followed her for love and will follow her anywhere. Amanda still wants him to meet Elizabeth, but Elizabeth has thoroughly embraced modern life, and is shocked to meet Darcy, having read the novel.

Amanda hurries them back to her bathroom portal for their return to Longbourn, but the door will not open for Elizabeth, only for Amanda. Although Michael threatens to leave Amanda if she goes through the door, she goes anyway, so that Elizabeth can return to her time, see to her father, and marry Darcy.

Mr Bennet returns home to make a full recovery, thanks to Elizabeth's nursing. Lady Catherine, knowing Amanda's hold over Darcy, arrives at Longbourn and bargains for Amanda's departure by promising to have Jane's marriage to Mr Collins annulled on the grounds of non-consummation. Amanda agrees.

Caroline is upset when she learns that her engagement to Darcy is over but appears intrigued when Wickham shows his interest in her. Jane and Bingley plan to marry and leave for America, and Amanda persuades Elizabeth to try to learn to love Darcy. Darcy tells Amanda that he will mind his duty and marry Elizabeth.

However, when Amanda opens the door to return home, she finds a note that Darcy has left for her: "Not one heartbeat do I forget."

Amanda decides to stay in the world of Pride and Prejudice and rushes to Pemberley to be with Darcy. Elizabeth gets her father's blessing to return to Hammersmith and modern times.

== Cast ==
- Jemima Rooper as Amanda Price
- Elliot Cowan as Fitzwilliam Darcy
- Tom Mison as Mr Bingley
- Alex Kingston as Mrs Bennet
- Hugh Bonneville as Mr Bennet
- Morven Christie as Jane Bennet
- Tom Riley as George Wickham
- Perdita Weeks as Lydia Bennet
- Gemma Arterton as Elizabeth Bennet
- Christina Cole as Caroline Bingley
- Florence Hoath as Catherine "Kitty" Bennet
- Lindsay Duncan as Lady Catherine de Bourgh
- Guy Henry as Mr William Collins
- Michelle Duncan as Charlotte Lucas
- Ruby Bentall as Mary Bennet
- Paul Hine as Cymbal Collins
- Pippa Haywood as Frankie, Amanda's mother.
- Gugu Mbatha-Raw as Pirhana, Amanda's friend.
- Daniel Percival as Michael Dolan, Amanda's boyfriend.
- Genevieve Gaunt as Georgiana Darcy
- Sarah Emmott as Elspeth, one of the Bennet household maids

== Production ==
Lost in Austen was produced by Mammoth Screen. The first episode was shown on ITV at 9 pm on 3 September 2008, gaining 4.2 million viewers. The remaining episodes were broadcast on a weekly basis.

The series premiered in America on the Ovation Channel on 11 January 2009. In Australia the series was broadcast in two parts on the ABC beginning on 8 March 2009.

=== Setting ===
Amanda Price's workplace was filmed in Wakefield at the disused Yorkshire Bank building on Westgate. The Beluga Lounge on Market Street, also in Wakefield, was the set of a London wine bar. Several areas inside and outside Cannon Hall at Cannon Hall Museum, near Barnsley, feature in the production, including the oak-panelled ballroom. Leeds-based Screen Yorkshire told production company Mammoth Screen of the potential of some landscapes in the Wetherby district as the setting for Lost in Austen. Filming took place at locations including Bramham Park, parts of York, and Leeds City Markets. Harewood House, near to Leeds, was the setting for Pemberley.

Filming locations for Lost in Austen

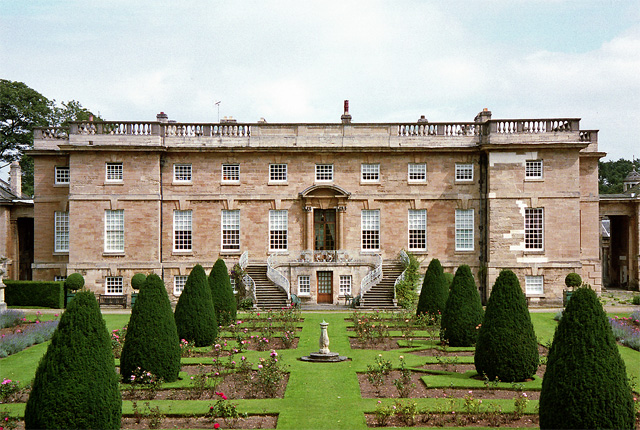
Bramham Park
(The Bennets' Longbourn)

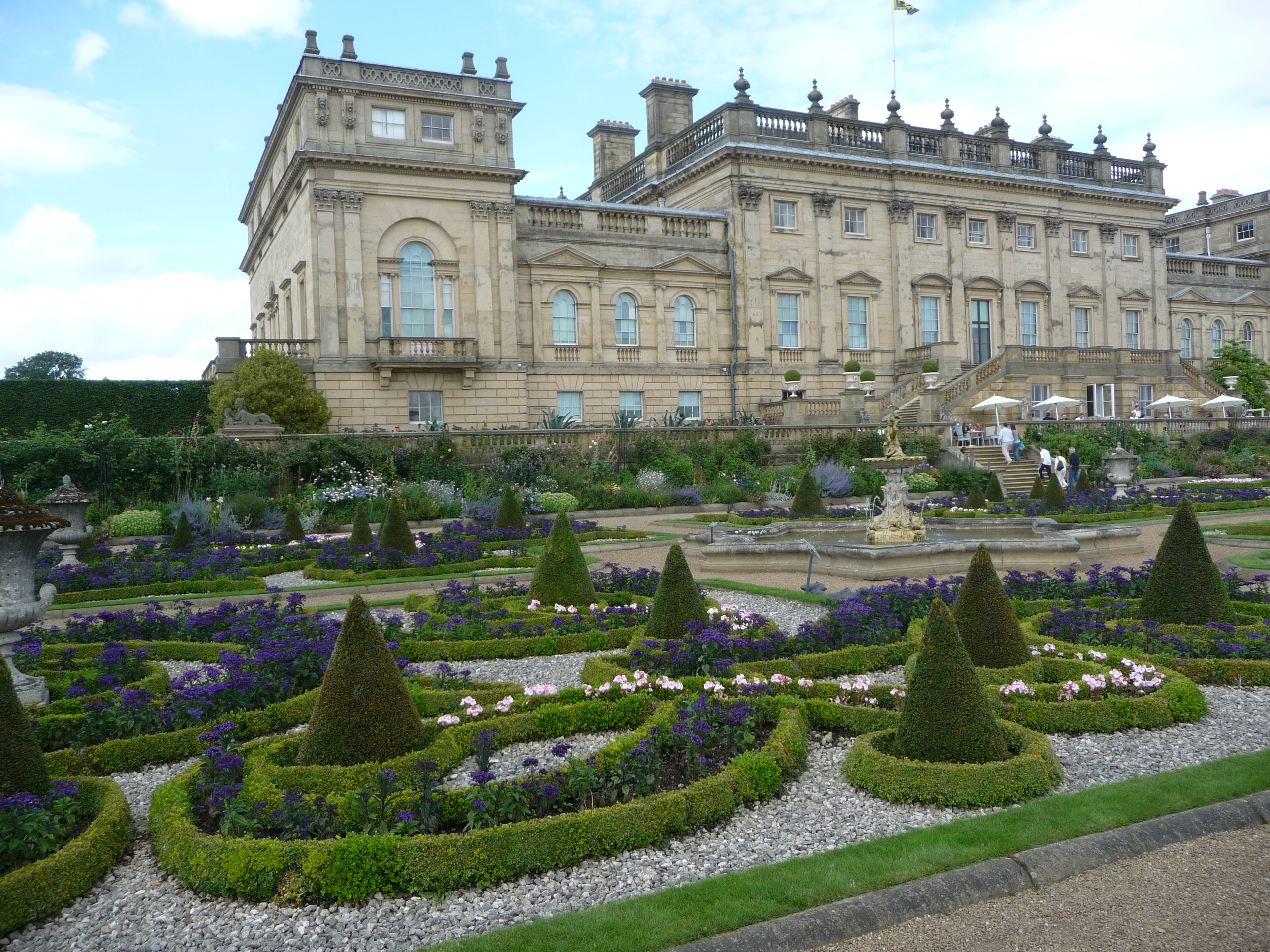
Harewood House
(Mr Darcy's Pemberley)

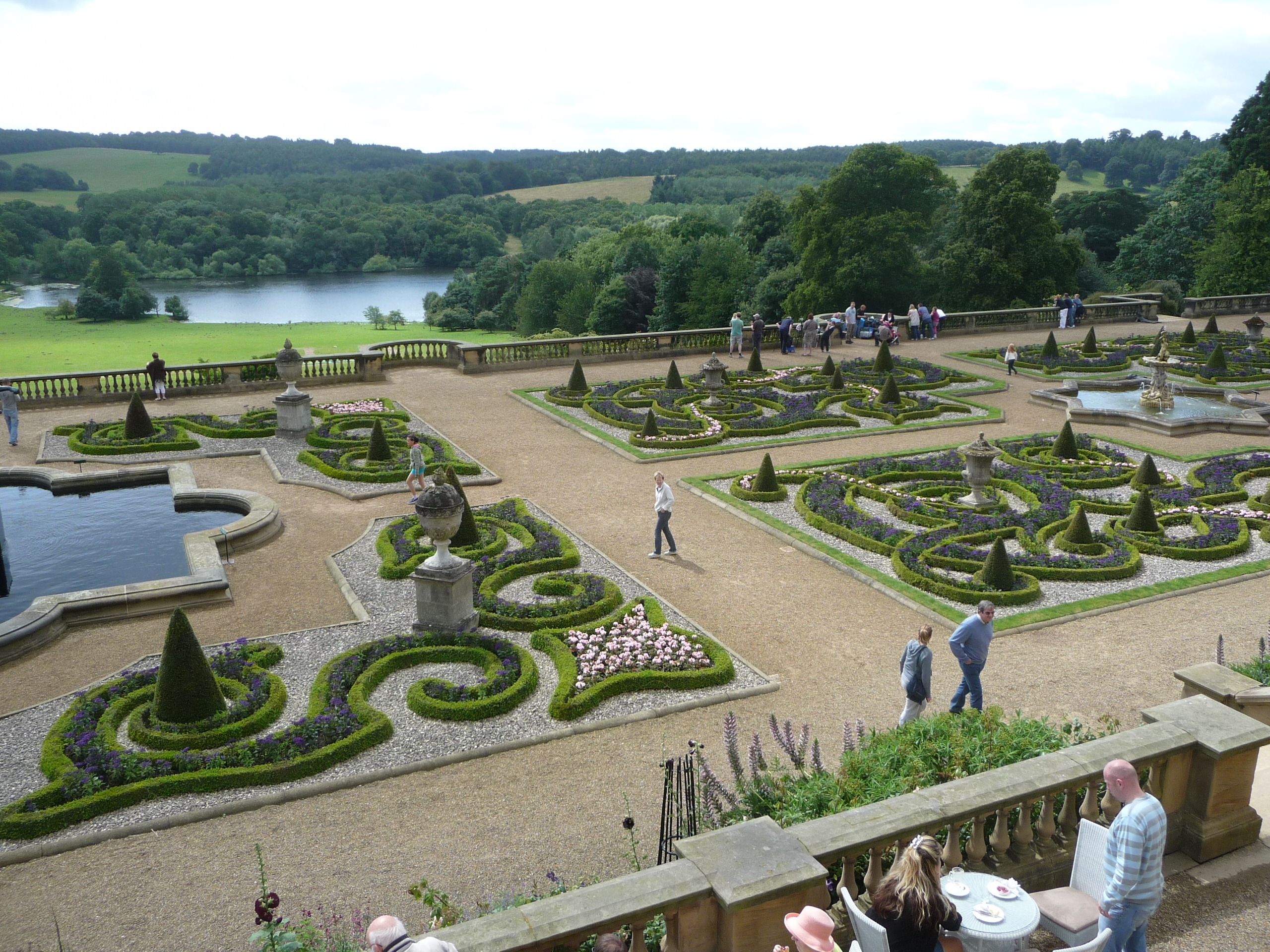
Garden terrace at Harewood

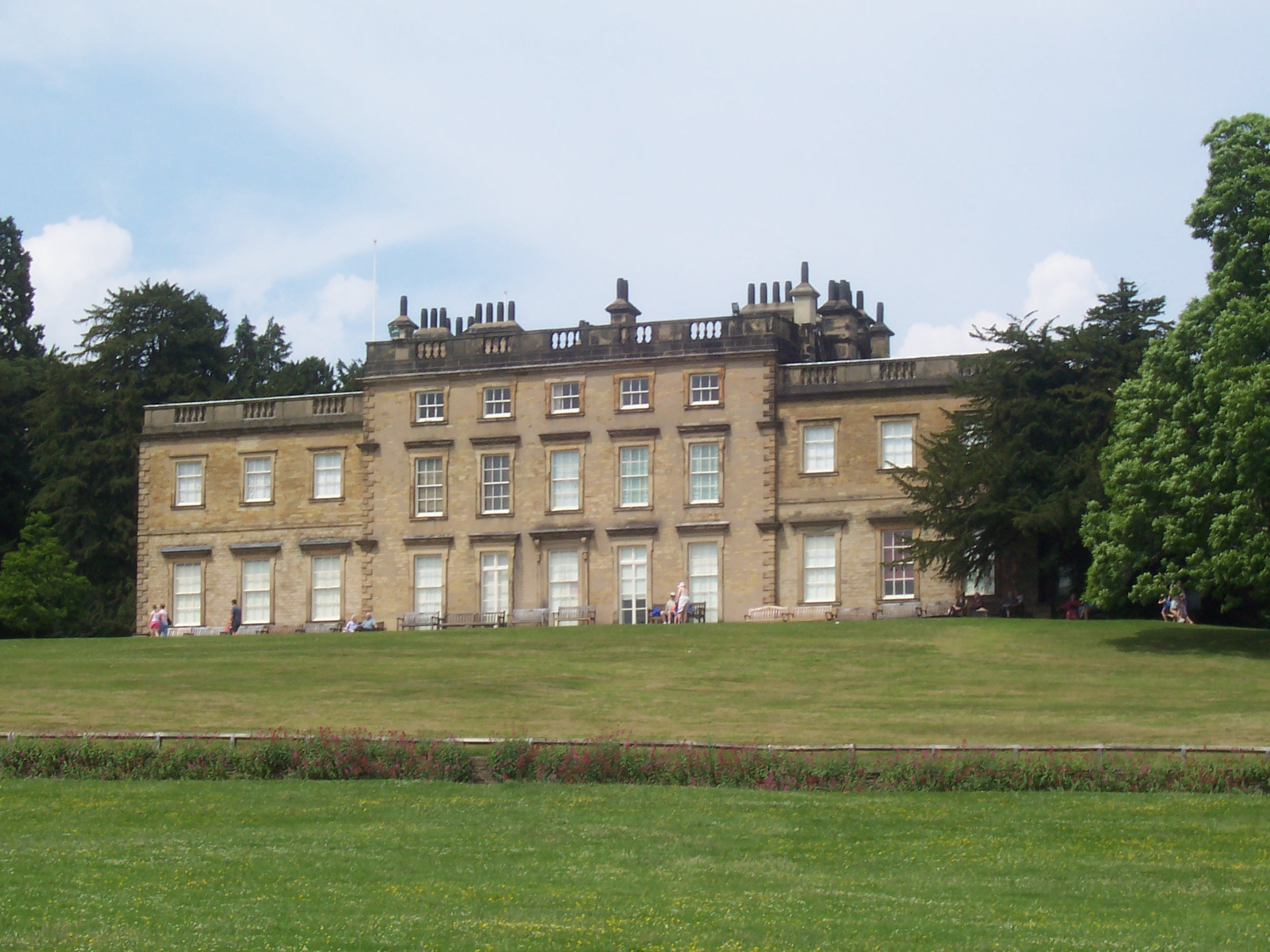
Cannon Hall
(Mr Bingley's Netherfield)

=== Actors ===
Thirty-one-year-old actor Elliot Cowan (Mr Darcy) was offered the part when he was playing Henry V. Because, in his words, the show "has a similar sort of iconography within the theatre canon", he was not worried. Christina Cole and lead actress Jemima Rooper previously starred together in the Sky One supernatural series Hex, whilst Rooper and Mison appeared together shortly afterwards, again on ITV, in the Agatha Christie's Poirot adaptation of Third Girl (first broadcast 28 September 2008).

Alex Kingston (Mrs Bennet) found a sadness in her character and played her as "a woman unhappy in her marital situation. Her husband is, in essence, absent in the marriage and in the family. She tries to keep everything together without the emotional tools. It's this that makes her twittery. I think people can be driven slowly to becoming those people by the unfortunate situations that they're in. ... Mr Bennet is absolutely culpable for his wife's twittering. She's overcompensating for her husband's absence."

== Music ==
The song Miss Bingley is playing and singing on the piano in episode 3 at Rosings was written by Mozart and is entitled "Lied der Freiheit" (K506).

== DVD ==
The DVD was released in the UK on 28 September 2008 and in the United States on 28 April 2009. It contains two discs with the four episodes plus a "Making of" documentary.

== Reception ==
=== Ratings ===
Lost in Austen won critical praise but struggled in the ratings against BBC One's hit series Who Do You Think You Are? Consolidated ratings for the first episode averaged 4,185,000 individuals and a 17.6% share. The consolidated ratings for episode two averaged 3,489,000 individuals and a 14.8% share. The third episode's consolidated figures were 3,256,000 and a 13.2% share.

According to overnight figures, Lost In Austen ended its run with 3.06m and 13.6% share. While the show could not match the slot average for the year of 3.8m (16.1%), it gave a significant boost to the commercial network's upmarket profile. Over the series, 46% of the show's audience came from the ABC1 demographic, an increase of 22.7% on the channel's performance that year of 37.5%.

=== Critical reception ===
Lost in Austen was well received by the press throughout its run. Lost in Austen was the subject of various blogs, including a series by Sarah Dempster writing online in The Guardian.

Reviewing the first episode of the four-parter, a Times writer described Lost in Austen as "a funny, clever breeze". James Walton of The Daily Telegraph noted that "it does triumphantly achieve its main aim of being enormously good-natured fun."

The Guardian's reviewer wrote "I loved it". Hermione Eyre in The Independent on Sunday wrote "This a sweet and foamy guilty pleasure, the advocaat on the TV cocktail list."

Reviewing episode two, Nancy Banks-Smith in The Guardian wrote it was "Amazingly good for ITV. Surely some mistake here?". Under the headline "creative revival is not enough to reverse ITV's historic low", Janine Gibson wrote in The Guardian that the show is "flawed, but ambitious; a big ask, but answered with verve; polarising and a bit controversial. It is, in short, the sort of thing we've come to expect of BBC1". Reviewing episode three, Tim Teeman in The Times wrote "it was fun to have Amanda ask Mr Darcy to emerge from the water so that she could indulge a fantasy she had only read on the page".

Reviewing the final episode, Tim Teeman in The Times continued his praise, giving the show five stars. Readers of the Media Guardian voted Lost in Austen their 16th favourite TV show of 2008, the first time an ITV drama has made the poll.

== Planned movie version ==
On 11 February 2009, The Guardian newspaper reported that a movie version of the series was under development. Oscar-winning director Sam Mendes was attached as an executive producer. Nora Ephron was working on the project at the time of her death in 2012. Two years after Ephron's death, Carrie Brownstein was asked to finish the script.

The four parts of the miniseries were put together as a movie and released on DVD. The North American version differs in that the scene with Amanda Price singing "Downtown" was eliminated, as was a ringtone using the music from the 1995 BBC version of Pride and Prejudice.
