= List of literary adaptations of Pride and Prejudice =

Adaptations of Jane Austen's 1813 novel

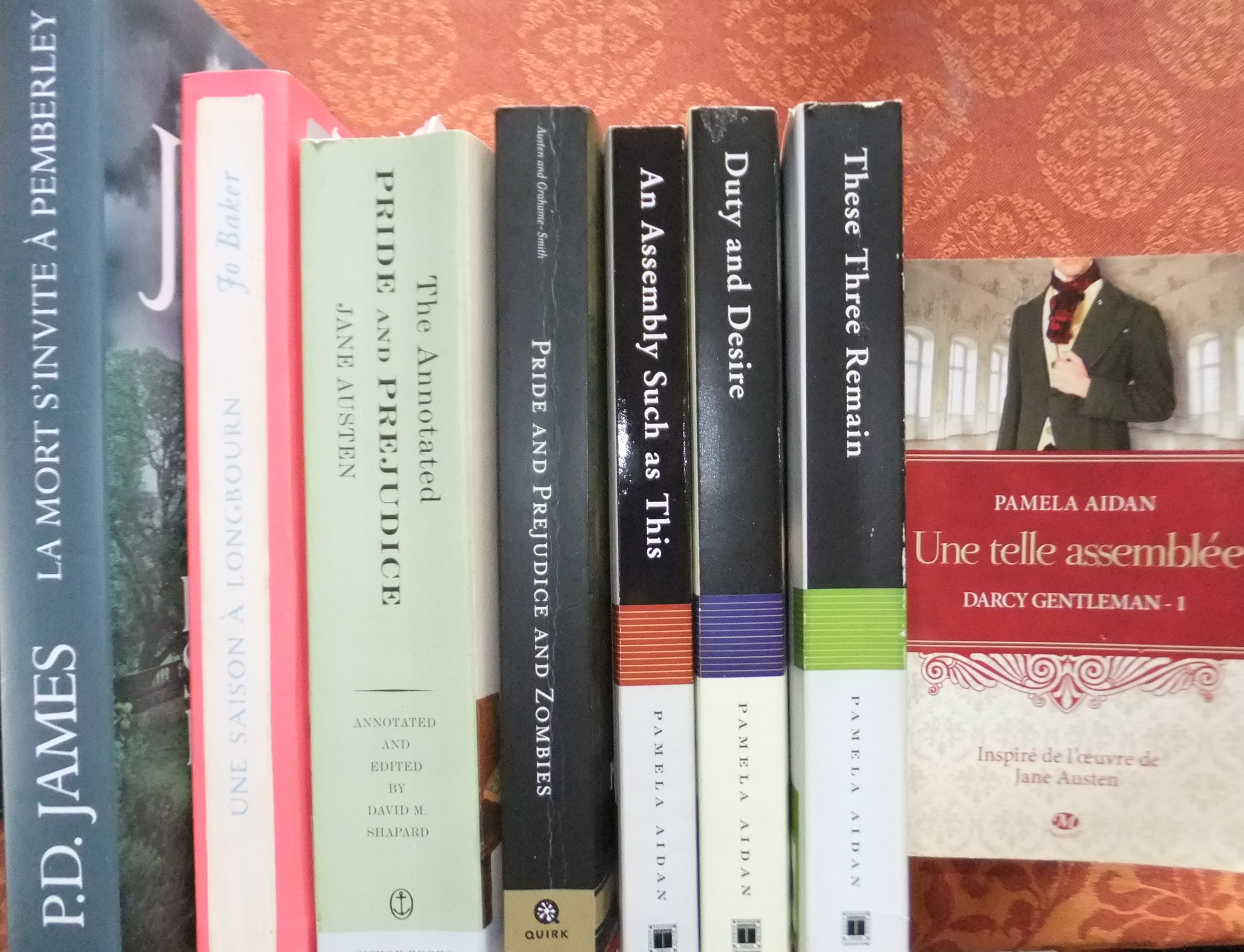
Pride & Prejudice-fiction

The following is a list of literary adaptations of the 1813 novel Pride and Prejudice by Jane Austen. The first sequel to Austen's novel was Old Friends and New Fancies from 1913. In 2018 the Cincinnati Enquirer noted, "It seems that Janeites – diehard lovers of Jane Austen’s works – can’t get enough of the author’s characters", although it was argued in Cosmopolitan that "our Mr. Darcy obsession needs to die."

== Literature ==
=== Works by Pamela Aidan ===
- An Assembly Such as This (2006)
- Duty and Desire (2006)
- These Three Remain (2007)
- Young Master Darcy – A Lesson in Honour (2010)
- A Proper Darcy Christmas (2022)

=== Works by Eden Appiah-Kubi ===
- The Bennet Women (2021)

=== Works by Elizabeth Aston ===
- Mr. Darcy's Daughters (2003)
- The Exploits & Adventures of Miss Alethea Darcy (2005)
- The True Darcy Spirit (2006)
- The Second Mrs. Darcy (2007)
- The Darcy Connection (2008)
- Mr. Darcy's Dream (2009)
- The Darcy Legacy (2012)

=== Works by Janet Aylmer ===
- Darcy's Story (UK 1996, US 2006)
- The New Illustrated Darcy's Story (1999)
- Dialogue with Darcy (2010)
- The Complete Dialogue with Darcy (2013)

=== Works by Jo Baker ===
- Longbourn (2013)

=== Works by Carrie Bebris ===
- Pride and Prescience: or, A Truth Universally Acknowledged (2004)
- Suspense and Sensibility: or, First Impressions Revisited (2005)
- North By Northanger: or, The Shades of Pemberley (2006)
- The Matters of Mansfield: or, The Crawford Affair (2008)
- The Intrigue at Highbury: or, Emma's Match (2010)
- The Deception at Lyme: or, The Peril of Persuasion (2011)
- The Suspicion at Sanditon: or, The Disappearance of Lady Denham (2015)

=== Works by Jennifer Becton ===
- Charlotte Collins: A Continuation of Jane Austen's Pride and Prejudice (2010)
- Mary Bennet: A Novella in the Personages of Pride & Prejudice Collection (2014)
- Live, Love, Longbourn: A Bennet Sisters Novel (2020)
- Infatuation & Independence: A Modern Austen Short Story (2018)
- Maria Lucas: A Short Story in the Personages of Pride & Prejudice Collection (2010)
- Caroline Bingley: A Continuation of Jane Austen's Pride & Prejudice (2011)

=== Works by Linda Berdoll ===
- The Bar Sinister (1999)
- Mr. Darcy Takes a Wife (2004)
- Darcy & Elizabeth: Nights and Days at Pemberley (2006)
- The Darcys: The Ruling Passion (2011)
- The Darcys: New Pleasures (2016)

=== Works by Diana Birchall ===
- Mrs. Darcy's Dilemma (2008)
- In The Shrubbery: Part of Jane Bennet In January (2016)
- The Scenes Jane Austen Never Wrote: First Anniversaries (2015)
- Anniversary February (2016)

=== Works by Cheryl Bolen ===
- Miss Darcy's New Companion (2016)
- Miss Darcy's Secret Love (2016)
- The Liberation of Miss de Bourgh (2016)

=== Works by D. A. Bonavia-Hunt ===
- Pemberley Shades (1949)

=== Works by Sybil G. Brinton ===
- Old Friends and New Fancies (1913) (the first sequel to Jane Austen's novels, also including characters from all other five novels)

=== Works by Jessica Bull ===
- Miss Austen Investigates (2025)

=== Works by Katherine J. Chen ===
- Mary B (2018)

=== Works by Katherine Cowley ===
- The Secret Life of Miss Mary Bennet (2021)
- The True Confessions of a London Spy (2022)
- The Lady's Guide to Death and Deception (2022)

=== Works by Karen M. Cox ===
- 1932 (2010)
- A Nightmare on Grosvenor Street: A Mr. Darcy Short Story (2010)
- The Journey Home: A 1932 Sidequel (2017)
- Undeceived: Pride & Prejudice in the Spy Game (2016)
- The Darcy Monologues (2017) (one of many authors).

=== Works by Amy Elizabeth Davis ===
- Darcy Bites: Pride and Prejudice with Fangs (2015)

=== Works by Jane Dawkins ===
- Letters from Pemberley: The First Year (2007)
- More Letters from Pemberley: 1814-1819: A Further Continuation of Jane Austen's Pride and Prejudice (2003)

=== Works by Melissa de la Cruz ===
- Pride and Prejudice and Mistletoe (2017)

=== Works by Sonali Dev ===
- Pride, Prejudice, and Other Flavors (2019)

=== Works by Jude Deveraux ===
The Girl from Summer Hill (2016)

=== Works by Anna Elliott ===
- Georgiana Darcy's Diary (2011)
- Pemberley to Waterloo (2011)
- Kitty Bennet's Diary (2014)

=== Work by Elizabeth Eulberg ===
- Prom and Prejudice (2011)

=== Works by Philip José Farmer ===
- Tarzan Alive! (1972) – "include[s] numerous nineteenth-century literary characters including Elizabeth Bennet and Fitzwilliam Darcy from Jane Austen's Pride & Prejudice, by means of an elaborate genealogical table."

=== Works by Natasha Farrant ===
- The Secret Diary of Lydia Bennet (2016)

=== Works by Helen Fielding ===
- Bridget Jones's Diary (1996)
- Bridget Jones: The Edge of Reason (1999)
- Bridget Jones: Mad About the Boy (2013)
- Bridget Jones's Baby: The Diaries (2016)

=== Works by Terri Fleming ===
- Perception (2018)

=== Works by Katherine Furman ===
- Emoji Pride and Prejudice: Epic Tales in Tiny Texts (2016)

=== Works by Grace Gibson ===
- The Winter of Our Discontent: A Pride and Prejudice Variation (2025)
- A Practical Man: A Pride and Prejudice Variation (2026)
- The Last House in Lambton: A Pride and Prejudice Variation (2025)
- The Zephyr: A Pride and Prejudice Variation (2025)
- Reckless, Headstrong Girl: A Pride and Prejudice Variation (2021)
- Silver Buckles: A Pride and Prejudice Variation (2020)
- Old Boots: A Pride and Prejudice Variation (2021)

=== Works by Seth Grahame-Smith ===
- Pride and Prejudice and Zombies (2009) – this work transposes the undead into Jane Austen's work, and is technically co-authored by Jane Austen

=== Works by Amanda Grange ===
- Mr. Darcy's Diary (2007)
- Mr Darcy, Vampyre (2009)
- Dear Mr. Darcy (2012)
- Wickham's Diary (2011)
- Pride and Pyramids (2012)

=== Works by Claudia Gray ===
- The Murder of Mr. Wickham (2022)
- The Late Mrs. Willoughby (2023)
- The Perils of Lady Catherine de Bourgh (2024)
- The Rushworth Family Plot (2025)
- The Fatal Unpleasantness at Netherfield (2026)

=== Works by Janice Hadlow ===
- The Other Bennet Sister (2020)

=== Works by Shannon Hale ===
- Austenland (2007) – deals with a woman obsessed with finding her own Mr. Darcy.

=== Works by Ann Herendeen ===
- Pride/Prejudice (2010) slash fiction work imagines Darcy and Elizabeth as bisexuals.

=== Works by Steve Hockensmith ===
- Pride and Prejudice and Zombies: Dawn of the Dreadfuls (2010)
- Pride and Prejudice and Zombies: Dreadfully Ever After (2011)

=== Works by P. D. James ===
- Death Comes to Pemberley (2011)

=== Works by Uzma Jalaluddin ===
- Ayesha at Last (2019)

=== Works by Soniah Kamal ===
- Unmarriageable (2019)

=== Works by Camille Kellogg ===
- Just as You Are (2023)

=== Works by Claire LaZebnik ===
- Epic Fail (2011)

=== Works by Sharon Lathan ===
- Mr. and Mrs. Fitzwilliam Darcy: Two Shall Become One (2007)
- Loving Mr. Darcy: Journeys Beyond Pemberley (2009)
- My Dearest Mr. Darcy: An Amazing Journey into Love Everlasting (2010)
- In the Arms of Mr. Darcy (2010)
- A Darcy Christmas (2010)
- The Trouble with Mr. Darcy (2011)
- Miss Darcy Falls in Love (2011)
- The Passions of Dr. Darcy (2013)
- Darcy & Elizabeth: A Season of Courtship (2014)
- Darcy & Elizabeth: Hope of the Future (2017)

=== Works by Rachael Lippincott ===
- Pride and Prejudice and Pittsburgh (2023)

=== Works by Ophelia London ===
- Definitely, Maybe in Love (2013)
- London Holiday: A Pride & Prejudice Romantic Comedy (2018)

=== Works by Judy McCrosky ===
- Miss Bingley Requests (2016)

=== Works by Colleen McCullough ===
- The Independence of Miss Mary Bennet (2009)

=== Works by Melissa Nathan ===
- Pride, Prejudice and Jasmin Field (2000) (Republished in 2008 under the title Acting Up)

=== Works by Vera Nazarian ===
- Pride and Platypus: Mr. Darcy's Dreadful Secret (2012)

=== Works by Gabe Cole Novoa ===
- Most Ardently (2024)

=== Works by Jane Odiwe ===
- Lydia Bennet's Story (2008)
- Mr. Darcy's Secret (2011)

=== Works by Jennifer Paynter ===
- Mary Bennet (2014)

=== Works by Angourie Rice and Kate Rice ===
- Stuck Up and Stupid (2025)

=== Work by Heather Lynn Rigaud ===
- Fitzwilliam Darcy, Rock Star (2011)

=== Works by Patrice Sarath ===
- The Unexpected Miss Bennet (2011)

=== Works by Curtis Sittenfeld ===
- Eligible (2016)

=== Works by Bernie Su and Kate Rorick ===
- The Secret Diary of Lizzie Bennet: A Novel (Lizzie Bennet Diaries) (2014)
- The Epic Adventures of Lydia Bennet: A Novel (Lizzie Bennet Diaries) (2015)

=== Works by Emma Tennant ===
- Pemberley: Or Pride & Prejudice Continued (1993)
- An Unequal Marriage: Or Pride and Prejudice Twenty Years Later (1994)

=== Works by Jack Wang, Holman Wang, and Jane Austen ===
- Cozy Classics: Pride and Prejudice (a board book for infants) (2016)

=== Works by Lee Welch ===
- Mr Collins in Love (2025)

=== Works by Elle Katharine White ===
- Heartstone (2017)

=== Works by Ibi Zoboi ===
- Pride (2018)

== See also ==
- Jane Austen in popular culture
- Jane Austen fan fiction
