= Jane Austen fan fiction =

Fan-made stories inspired by Jane Austen

Cover of Old Friends and New Fancies, by Sybil Brinton, considered to be the first work of Austen fan-fiction. (1913)

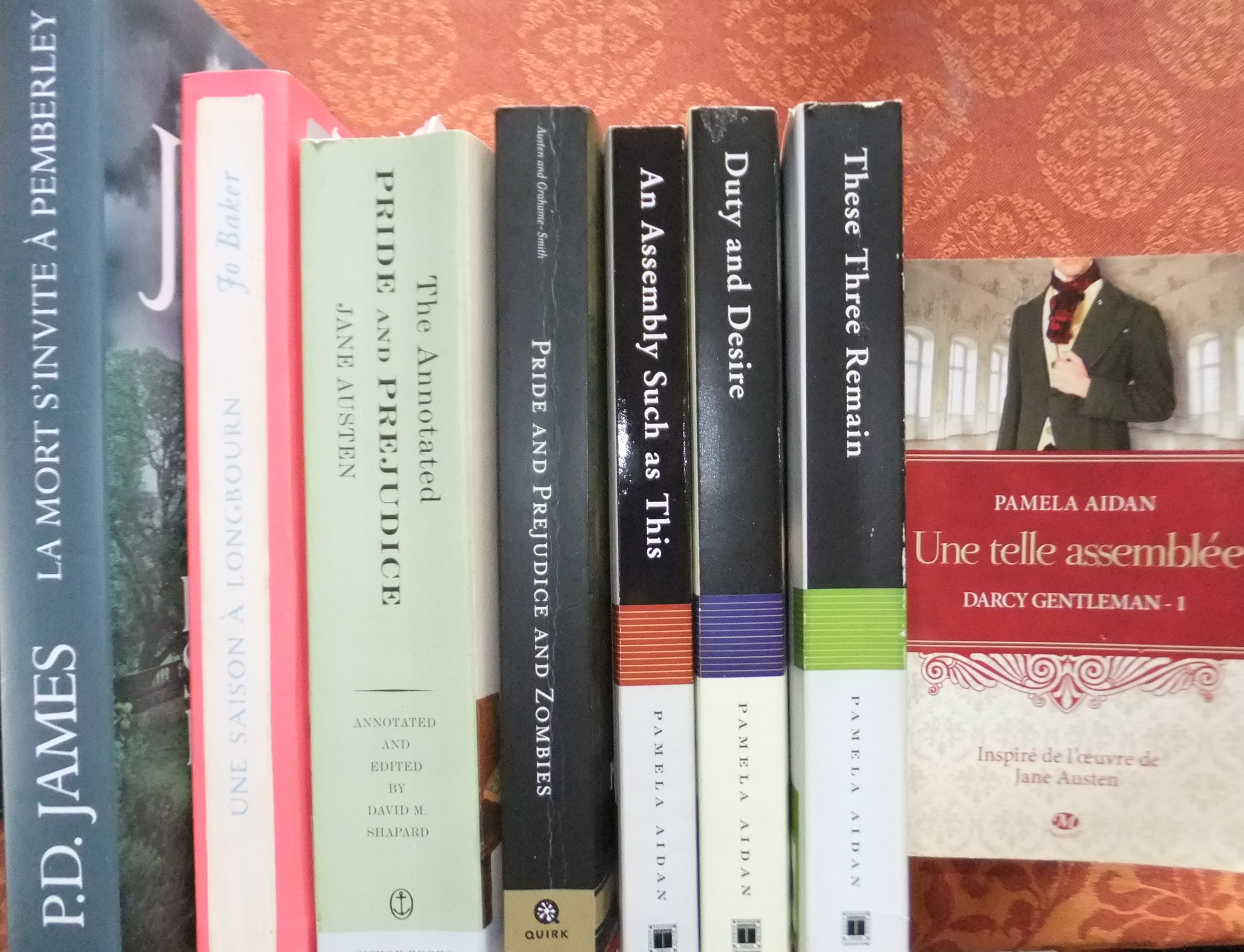
Pride and Prejudice fiction

Jane Austen fan fiction is the collection of numerous sequels and spin-offs produced by authors who have either used the plot of Austen's original novels, or have extended them, to produce new works of fiction. Austen's posthumous popularity has inspired fan fiction that runs the gamut through numerous genres, but the most concentrated medium has remained the novel. According to Pucci and Thompson in their 2003 survey on the contemporary evolution of Jane Austen's work, at the turn of the 20th century (over 150 years after the final publication of her first collected works), over one hundred sequels, rewritings, and continuations of her novels had been published.

Pride and Prejudice accounted for the majority of published Austen-inspired books, at 900 total, and all six novels and three minor works are represented in published Jane Austen fan fiction (JAFF). The number of unpublished Austen-inspired stories on various JAFF sites at least doubles that number. They have continued to remain popular well into the 21st century, with modern adaptations reaching as high as third on The New York Times Best Seller list However, opinions remain mixed in regard to the liberties taken by authors when modifying or adding to the existing canon of Austen literature. While audiences have responded well commercially to various novels, critics have argued that transposing new work onto of the frame provided by Austen adulterates the genre. For example, while Dr. Lynda A. Hall is wary of how JAFF and adaptations of Jane Austen's novels distort the public's understanding of the original texts, she also believes that there is value in studying popular culture's representations of Austen's works.

== Notable works ==
Old Friends and New Fancies: An Imaginary Sequel to the Novels of Jane Austen – by Sybil Brinton (1913)

- Generally acknowledged to be the first sequel to the work of Jane Austen, Old Friends and New Fancies incorporates characters from each of Austen's six major novels into one unified story, alongside characters of Brinton's own invention. The novel generally focuses on various pairings of lovers and the challenges that their unions create.

Margaret Dashwood, or, Interference (1929) and Susan Price, or, Resolution (1930) – by Edith Charlotte Brown

- Two of the earliest Jane Austen sequels; of, respectively, Sense and Sensibility and Mansfield Park. Brown was Jane Austen's great-great-niece and had earlier published a completion of Austen's unfinished novel The Watsons. Both sequels received respectable reviews.

Pemberley: Or Pride and Prejudice Continued – by Emma Tennant (1993)

- Set approximately a year after the marriage of Elizabeth Bennet and Mr. Darcy, Pemberley: Or Pride and Prejudice Continued deals with the difficulties Elizabeth is having producing an heir for Mr. Darcy. When she sees Mr. Darcy walking in town with a young boy, she assumes he has had an affair, and decides to flee and become a governess. However, after leaving, she realises she is in fact with child. She eventually finds out that her husband has in fact been faithful to her, and they are reunited.

Mr. Darcy's Daughters – by Elizabeth Aston (2003)

- Set in 1818, twenty years after the conclusion of Pride and Prejudice, Mr. Darcy's Daughters deals with fleshing out the stories of Mr. Darcy's five daughters during their leave from Pemberley for London while their parents are out of the country. Much of the novel involves the romantic lives and coming of age adventures of the young women, but numerous subplots bring back former characters from Austen's original work, such as the Gardiner family, as well as their mother Elizabeth's rival Caroline Bingley.

Confessions of a Jane Austen Addict – by Laurie Viera Rigler (2007)

- A young woman named Courtney is transported in her sleep out of her apartment in Los Angeles, and into the body of an English woman in the year 1813. As a ravenous fan of Austen's work in her own life, she quickly assimilates into the world around her. Her love for the romantic ideals of her new-found environment clashes with the reality of everyday life in 19th-century England, stock full of chamber pots and economically driven marriage.

Mr. Fitzwilliam Darcy: The Last Man in the World – by Abigail Reynolds (2009)

- In this variation of Austen's Pride and Prejudice, Elizabeth Bennet is forced to marry Mr. Darcy after they are discovered in a seemingly compromising position when he makes his first proposal to her, and without the chance to learn that her dislike of him was based on lies. She tries to make the best of her situation by behaving in ways she thinks will please Darcy. As his frustration grows over the change in her behaviour, Elizabeth gradually discovers that her new husband is not the ill-tempered man she believed him to be, and is the best husband in the world for her.

Pride and Prejudice and Zombies – by Seth Grahame-Smith (2009)

- A work in which a modern tale of zombie fiction is overlaid on the original story of Pride and Prejudice by Jane Austen. In this alternate universe, zombies have come to inhabit the landscape of Austen's original novel, and provide new wrinkles and twists to the plot, as well as a great deal of comedic relief such as portraying Elizabeth Bennet and her four sisters as masters of martial arts. The novel was well received by readers, and was third on the New York Times Best Seller list. In 2016, a film based on Pride and Prejudice and Zombies was released starring Lily James as Elizabeth and Sam Riley as Mr. Darcy.

Sense and Sensibility and Sea Monsters – by Ben H. Winters (2009)

- In a similar vein as Pride and Prejudice and Zombies, Sense and Sensibility and Sea Monsters lays numerous allusions and motifs commonly associated with tales of sea monsters on top of Jane Austen's original tale, Sense and Sensibility. The sea monster elements are woven into the story as an alternate means of driving plot events such as the deaths of certain characters.

Death Comes to Pemberley – by P D James (2011)

- A sequel to Pride and Prejudice, this continues the story of Darcy and Elizabeth and some of the other characters from the original novel six years later, within the framework of a mystery story based on a murder at Pemberley.

Longbourn -- by Jo Baker (2014)

- As a New York Times best selling novel, Longbourn follows the story of an orphaned girl named Sarah who is one of the housemaids to the Bennett family from Jane Austen's Pride and Prejudice.

The Other Bennet Sister – by Janice Hadlow (2020)

- The novel begins retells events from Pride and Prejudice from Mary Bennet’s perspective. Unlike her sisters, Mary is socially awkward, bookish and overshadowed by her sisters. The novel was adapted into a television series of the same name which premiered in March 2026.
