= Old Friends and New Fancies =

Unauthorized sequel to the novels of Jane Austen

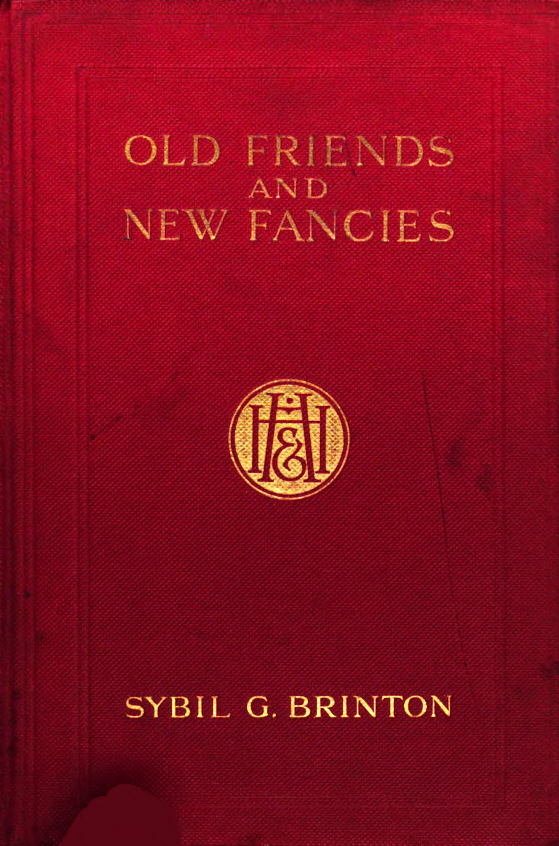
- Author: Sybil G. Brinton
- Genre: Fan fiction; Romance
- Publisher: Holden & Hardingham
- Publication date: 1914

Old Friends and New Fancies: An Imaginary Sequel to the Novels of Jane Austen (1913) is a novel by Sybil G. Brinton that is often acknowledged to be the first sequel to the works of Jane Austen and as such is possibly the first piece of published Austen fan fiction, although earlier examples have been described by Sarah Glosson. It incorporates characters from each of Austen's six major novels into one unified story, alongside characters of Brinton's own invention. Keeping to the spirit of the source novels, its major theme is the difficulties faced by assorted pairs of lovers placed within the class structure of early 19th century Britain.

== Plot ==
Old Friends and New Fancies brings together characters from all six of Jane Austen's major novels, placing them within a single extended social world. In this setting, figures such as Elizabeth (Bennet) Darcy, Elinor (Dashwood) Ferrars, and Anne (Elliot) Wentworth are depicted as friends who move in the same social circles. The narrative begins several years after the marriage of Elizabeth and Fitzwilliam Darcy, who are now settled at Pemberley with their two young children. Darcy's sister Georgiana Darcy has been engaged for six months to their cousin Colonel Fitzwilliam, but the engagement proves unhappy, and the two mutually agree to end it.

The Darcys and Colonel Fitzwilliam travel to Bath to visit Lady Catherine de Bourgh. During the visit, Colonel Fitzwilliam meets Mary Crawford and soon falls in love with her. However, Lucy Ferrars and Robert Ferrars, who have been cultivating Lady Catherine's favor, hope that the colonel will instead marry Lucy's sister Anne. To achieve this, they slander Mary to Lady Catherine, resulting in Mary's abrupt exclusion from Lady Catherine's circle. Feeling isolated, Mary begins spending time with Sir Walter Elliott, leading to rumors that the two intend to marry. Believing that his limited income and lack of title make him an unsuitable match for her, Colonel Fitzwilliam withdraws by traveling to Ireland. The pair are only reconciled after the colonel is severely injured in a hunting accident.

Meanwhile, Kitty Bennet is in London as a protégé of Emma (Woodhouse) Knightley. Though mellowed from her once flighty behavior, Kitty becomes infatuated with William Price, a naval officer and the younger brother of Fanny (Price) Bertram. When Georgiana visits Kitty in London, she meets William at a ball hosted by the Knightleys. Later, Kitty stays with the Darcys at Pemberley, where her expectation of a proposal from William grows. At a grand Pemberley ball, however, William instead declares his love for Georgiana. Out of concern for Kitty's feelings and uncertainty about her own, Georgiana initially rejects him, but she and William later become engaged. Kitty, chastened but wiser, accepts the attentions of James Morland, a clergyman placed in a Derbyshire parish through Darcy's influence (an ending that echoes a possibility mentioned in Austen's letters)

Toward the end of the novel, Tom Bertram forms an attachment to Isabella Thorpe.

== Source novels of key characters ==
- Pride and Prejudice: Kitty Bennet, Elizabeth Bennet (here Elizabeth Darcy), Fitzwilliam Darcy, Georgiana Darcy, Colonel Fitzwilliam, Lady Catherine de Bourgh
- Mansfield Park: Mary Crawford, William Price, Tom Bertram
- Sense and Sensibility: Elinor Dashwood (here Elinor Ferrars), Robert Ferrars, Lucy Steele (here Lucy Ferrars), Anne Steele
- Emma: Emma Woodhouse (here Emma Knightley), George Knightley
- Persuasion: Anne Elliot (here Anne Wentworth), Sir Walter Elliott
- Northanger Abbey: Isabella Thorpe, James Morland

== Author and style ==
Very little is known about Sybil Grace Brinton. She was born in 1874 at Stourport-on-Severn in Worcestershire and suffered from ill health throughout her life. She married in 1908 and died in 1928. "Old Friends and New Fancies", which she described as her “little attempt at picturing the after-adventures of some of Jane Austen's characters,” was her only book. Only a few editions were published during her lifetime, and the novel remained relatively obscure until it was reprinted in 1998, after it had passed into the public domain. Brinton notes in her preface that she drew on a memoir by Jane Austen's nephew James Austen-Leigh as one source for her plot elements.

Critics have commented on Brinton's ambitious narrative strategy: she brings together characters from all six of Austen's major novels, creating an extensive network of friends, relations, and acquaintances. Despite a provided list of characters sorted by source novel, readers often find the large cast difficult to track, particularly as many characters appear only briefly or in passing. Most familiar Austen characters are recognizable, though some are significantly altered: Kitty Bennet and Tom Bertram are generally considered “improved,” while George Knightley is somewhat sourer and Mary Crawford less lively than in their original depictions. The most notable divergence from Austen's canon is the death of Colonel Brandon prior to the novel's opening, leaving Marianne Dashwood a widow.

Some critics find Brinton's prose flat and the novel overburdened with minor characters; overall, it is often regarded as less successful than later Austen sequels. Although less sharply satirical than Austen, Brinton's style remains recognizably Austenian in spirit and tone:

The Rosings' card-parties lacked variety. Mr. and Mrs. Collins remained admirable listeners, but their conversation, like their civilities, occasionally wore a little thin. Lady Catherine, would she but have admitted it, thought that Mr. Collins was too much interested in his own asparagus-beds and too little in her peach-houses.

— Sybil G. Brinton, Old Friends and New Fancies

Brinton sometimes slips into anachronism, for instance using the adjective 'nice' in ways not employed in Austen's time. She uses less dialogue and banter than Austen, focusing more on her characters’ inner thoughts and motivations. Several plot elements resemble or echo Austen's originals—for example, charades at Pemberley (instead of Mansfield Park), a severe reprimand from Lady Catherine de Bourgh to Mary Crawford (instead of to Elizabeth Bennet), and Kitty Bennet’s illness (instead of Marianne Dashwood) caused by unrequited love. While these may be deliberate homages, some readers interpret them as a lack of inventiveness.

Although "Old Friends and New Fancies" is generally considered the first sequel to Jane Austen's works, a few earlier publications have competing claims. These include an 1815 French translation of "Sense and Sensibility" by Isabelle de Montolieu that altered the original ending, and the 1850 transformation of Austen's unfinished novel "The Watsons" into "The Younger Sister" by Austen's niece, Catherine Anne Hubback. As reworkings of existing manuscripts, these works are generally considered to have a weaker claim than Brinton's novel, which features an entirely original plot, even though nearly all characters are borrowed.
