= Mr. Darcy's Daughters =

2003 novel by Elizabeth Aston

- Author: Elizabeth Aston
- Language: English
- Genre: Novel
- Publisher: Simon & Schuster (US)
- Publication date: 2003
- Publication place: United Kingdom
- Followed by: The Exploits & Adventures of Miss Alethea Darcy

Mr. Darcy's Daughters is a 2003 novel by the English author Elizabeth Aston, published by Simon & Schuster in the United States. Set in 1818, Mr. Darcy's Daughters is written as a sequel to Jane Austen's 1813 novel Pride and Prejudice. It features the five daughters of Fitzwilliam Darcy and Elizabeth Bennet – aged 21 to 16 – as they navigate London society in the absence of their parents, who have embarked on a diplomatic post to Constantinople. In London, the sisters meet new friends and find themselves in various romantic entanglements, all while learning what is acceptable behaviour among the city's elite.

== Plot summary ==
Set in 1818, the story is a sequel to the events seen in Jane Austen's novel Pride and Prejudice. Fitzwilliam Darcy embarks for Constantinople to begin a diplomatic post, accompanied by his wife Elizabeth Bennet. In their absence, the couple's five wealthy daughters stay in London with their cousin, Mr Fitzwilliam. Aged 21 to 16, the sisters are prim and proper Letitia, witty Camilla, frivolous twins Georgina and Isabelle, and musical prodigy Alethea. Two younger brothers remain behind at the Darcy estate, Pemberley.

Letitia is dismayed to learn that her former fiancé, a man she thought dead for three years, is alive and married but apparently with no memory. Her emotional reaction, highly unfashionable, attracts unwanted gossip among London's elite. Meanwhile, Camilla befriends Sir Sidney Leigh and believes herself in love. Perceiving that he is not attracted to her, Camilla is shocked when he asks Fitzwilliam for her hand in marriage. However, she breaks off the engagement when a friend warns her that Leigh is a homosexual. Leigh flees the country for Italy due to laws banning sodomy, while negative rumours spread about Camilla's too obvious attachment to the man.

Camilla meets Mr Wytton, the fiancé of her rich cousin Sophie Gardiner. Wittily sarcastic, he enjoys archaeology and travelling to the continent, interests Sophie cares little for. Camilla finds him intelligent but saturnine, and intolerant of clever women. Over time it becomes clear that he and Sophie are ill-matched, as she prefer frivolous subjects like fashion.

Alethea begins learning from an Italian maestro, to the dismay of Letitia who believes her sister is going too far with her musical interests. Later, Camilla catches Alethea among musicians at a ball, dressed as a boy and playing the flute. With the help of Wytton, they are able to avoid scandal by quietly sending Alethea home in a carriage.

Caroline Bingley, now known as Lady Warren, spreads the malevolent rumour that Camilla desires to marry Wytton herself. Soon after, Georgina elopes to France with Sir Joshua Mordaunt, causing Camilla and Mr Gardiner to follow in the hopes of bringing Georgina home before scandal arises. They are surprised to encounter Wytton, who helps them find the eloping couple, now married. Camilla and Gardiner return home, only to discover that Isabelle has also eloped. Sophie angrily assumes that Isabelle is going to marry a Captain Allington, revealing that she is in love with Allington. Sophie releases Wytton from the engagement, leaving him free to marry Camilla whom he has gradually come to love throughout the story.

== Development ==
The release of the popular TV serial Pride and Prejudice (1995) led to a resurgence in interest for Jane Austen's works. Many writers were inspired by Austen, leading to a variety of novelizations and other adaptations being produced. Elizabeth Aston became one of the most prolific authors of Austen-related fiction. She had studied the author at St Hilda's College, Oxford under Lord David Cecil, a biographer of Austen. Aston felt that Austen's novels were "as fresh today as when they were written," and compared the novelist's genius with Mozart for "speak[ing] to the soul while it enchants and delights." When crafting her story, Aston opted not to prominently feature Austen characters such as Mr Darcy. Her stories instead feature newly invented characters related to those seen in Austen's works, such as members of the Darcy, Bingley, and Collins families.

== Reception ==
Mr. Darcy's Daughters was published in 2003 by Simon & Schuster. Its success encouraged the publisher to release other novels adapted from Austen's stories, including Pamela Aidan's Fitzwilliam Darcy, Gentleman series. A Dutch translation was released in 2003, followed by a Czech edition in 2009. It was followed by The Exploits & Adventures of Miss Alethea Darcy, released in 2004.

In a review of the novel, Publishers Weekly opines that it "reads more like a beach book for historical fiction fans than a literary homage to Austen's masterpiece," and feels the daughters were predictably written. The reviewer also critiques Aston for having little success at imitating Austen's style, believing the novel's prose to be "stilted and anachronistic". Paige Wiser, writing for the Chicago Sun-Times, notes that Aston pens her story in Austen's style, with a respectable result of "great characters, great comic moments, great romance". In 2013, Aja Romano of The Daily Dot listed it among the best Austen adaptations. It has been classified as fan fiction by several commentators.

== See also ==
- List of literary adaptations of Pride and Prejudice
