= Sara Wheeler =

English travel author (born 1961)

Sara Wheeler FRSL
- Born: Sara Diane Wheeler; 20 March 1961 (age 65) Bristol, United Kingdom
- Occupation: Travel writer and biographer
- Education: Oxford University (BA)
- Subject: Polar expeditions

Sara Diane Wheeler FRSL (born 20 March 1961) is an English travel author and biographer, noted for her accounts of polar regions.

== Biography ==
Sara Wheeler was born and brought up in Bristol, England, and studied Classics and Modern Languages at Brasenose College, University of Oxford. After writing about her travels on the Greek island of Euboea and in Chile, she was accepted by the US National Science Foundation as their first female writer-in-residence at the South Pole, and spent seven months in Antarctica.

In her resultant book, Terra Incognita: Travels in Antarctica, she mentioned sleeping in the captain's bunk in Scott's Hut. While in Antarctica, Wheeler read The Worst Journey in the World, an account of the Terra Nova Expedition, and she later wrote a biography of its author, Apsley Cherry-Garrard.

In 1999, Wheeler was elected a Fellow of the Royal Society of Literature. From 2005 to 2009, she served as Trustee of the London Library.

She was frequently abroad for two years, travelled to Russia, Alaska, Greenland, Canada and North Norway to write her book The Magnetic North: Travels in the Arctic. A journalist at the Daily Telegraph in the UK called it a "snowstorm of historical, geographical and anthropological facts".

In a 2012 BBC Radio 4 series titled To Strive and Seek, she told the personal stories of five members of the Terra Nova Expedition.

O My America!: Second Acts in a New World records the lives of women who travelled to America in the first half of the 19th century: Fanny Trollope, Fanny Kemble, Harriet Martineau, Rebecca Burlend, Isabella Bird, and Catherine Hubback, and the author's travels in pursuit of them.

In 2023, Wheeler published Glowing Still, a collection of essays based on her travels, and her reflections on how the world has changed in her lifetime.

== Travel books ==
- Evia: Travels on an Undiscovered Greek Island (1992), ISBN 0-356-20367-0
- Chile: Travels in a Thin Country (1994), ISBN 0-375-75365-6
- Terra Incognita: Travels in Antarctica (1997), ISBN 0-375-75338-9
- The Magnetic North: Travels in the Arctic (2010), ISBN 0-374-20013-0
- Access All Areas: Selected Writings 1990–2010 (2011), ISBN 0-224-09071-2
- Mud and Stars: Travels in Russia with Pushkin, Tolstoy, and Other Geniuses of the Golden Age (2019), ISBN 9-781-5247-48012
- Glowing Still:A Woman's Life on the Road (2023), ISBN 9-781-408716748

== Biographies ==
- Cherry: A Life of Apsley Cherry-Garrard (2002), ISBN 0-375-50328-5
- Too Close to the Sun: The Life and Times of Denys Finch Hatton (2006), ISBN 0-8129-6892-1
- O My America!: Second Acts in a New World (2013), ISBN 978-0-22409-070-4
- Jan Morris: A Life (2026)

== Children's book ==
- Dear Daniel: Letters from Antarctica (1997), ISBN 0-416-23690-1
