= Sonali =

Sonali is a popular Indian female given name.

== People ==
- Sonali Bendre (born 1975), Indian actress
- Shonali Bose (born 1965), Indian filmmaker
- Sonali Bhattacharyya (born 1978), British playwright
- Shonali Bhowmik (born 20th century), Indian-American musician
- Sonali Chakravarti Banerjee, Indian academician
- Sonali Chowdhury, Indian actress
- Sonali De Rycker, British-Indian venture capitalist
- Sonali Deraniyagala, Sri Lankan memoirist and economist
- Sonali Dev (born 1972), Indian American novelist
- Sonali Guha (born 1968), Indian politician
- Sonali Gulati, Indian-American filmmaker
- Sonali Khare (born 1982), Indian actress
- Sonali Kulkarni, Indian actress
- Sonali Kulkarni (businesswoman) (born 1965), Indian businesswoman
- Sonalee Kulkarni (born 1988), Indian actress
- Sonali Majumdar (born 2005), Indian salsa dancer
- Sonali Mukherjee (born 1985), Indian acid-attack victim
- Shonali Nagrani (born 1981), Indian actress
- Sonali Nikam, Indian actress
- Sonali Rao (born 1997), Indo-Fijian footballer
- Sunali Rathod, Indian singer
- Sonali Rastogi (born 1954), Indian architect
- Sonali Raut (born 1990), Indian actress
- Sonali Sachdev (born 1965), Indian actress
- Sonali Shah, British-Indian presenter and newsreader
- Sonali Verma, Indian actress
- Sonali Vishnu Shingate (born 1995), Indian Kabaddi player
- Indu Sonali (born 1980), Indian singer

== See also ==
- Sonal
- Sonali Bank, bank in Bangladesh
- Sonali Bag
- Sonali Cable, 2014 Indian drama film by Charudutt Acharya
