= Anselm Audley =

British fantasy writer

- Born: 1981 or 1982 (age 43–44)
- Education: Millfield School; St John's College, Oxford
- Occupation: Author
- Relatives: Elizabeth Aston (mother)
- Writing career
- Genre: Fantasy
- Notable work: The Aquasilva Trilogy (2002–2003)
- Website: anselmaudley.com

Anselm Audley (born 1982) is a British fantasy writer.

== Early life and career ==
Anselm Audley was born to Paul and Elizabeth Aston, and has a sister. His mother was also a novelist. He was educated at Millfield School and St John's College, Oxford, where he studied Ancient and Modern History. He started writing his epic Aquasilva novels when still a pupil at school and finished his first novel at the age of 17.

The Aquasilva Trilogy has been translated into German, French, Italian, Spanish and Dutch. Library Journal announced that, from Simon & Schuster UK, Audley received one of the largest advances ever paid to a new British fantasy author.

Vespera, a sequel to the Aquasilva Trilogy, was released on 13 November 2007 and electronically published in English. Envoy, a short story happening during Attila the Hun's invasion of the Roman Empire, published as part of the Foreworld Saga. It was released on 26 June 2013. The Day Democracy Died, his first non-fiction piece. This narrative history work tells how hysteria doomed Athens' democracy. It was released on 28 October 2014.

== The Aquasilva Trilogy ==
- Heresy (2001) is set within the stormy waterworld of Aquasilva. Aquasilva is controlled by the Domain, a religious power dedicated to the element fire. The Domain, however, is confronted by many forces of change. One of these unknowing change agents is Cathan, son of the count from Lepidor. Upon discovering iron on their territory, Cathan leaves his home to inform his father of this important find. During his journey Cathan stumbles upon a plot to unleash a new age of fundamentalism. New friends and new powers enable Cathan to confront this extremism.
- Inquisition (2002) is the second volume in the Aquasilva Trilogy. After the battle that restored Lepidor to freedom, Cathan sets off on his travels again to find an answer to the storm-magic he used to save his clan. In the process he soon discovers a new secret that will change his life forever.
- Crusade (2003) is the final work in the Aquasilva Trilogy. In this book Cathan finally discovers who he is. At the same time, religious fanatics of the Domain continue to seek out heresy and Cathan in particular.

== Bibliography ==
Audley has published the following books:

- Aquasilva Trilogy
  - Heresy (2001)
  - Inquisition (2002)
  - Crusade (2003)
- Vespera (2007)
- Envoy (2013)
- The Day Democracy Died (2014)
