= Elizabeth Aston =

English author (1948–2016)

- Born: Elizabeth Edmondson; 21 February 1948; Santiago, Chile
- Died: 11 January 2016 (aged 67); Oxford, England
- Resting place: Wolvercote Cemetery, Oxford
- Education: St Hilda's College, Oxford
- Occupation: Author
- Spouse: Paul Aston
- Children: Eloise Aston; Anselm Audley
- Writing career
- Pen name: Elizabeth Pewsey; Elizabeth Aston; Elizabeth Edmondson; Gally Marchmont
- Genres: Historical fiction, contemporary fiction, mystery
- Notable works: Mr. Darcy's Daughters; A Man of Some Repute; A Question of Inheritance

Elizabeth Edmondson (21 February 1948 – 11 January 2016), also known under the names Elizabeth Aston and Elizabeth Pewsey, was an English author who wrote primarily in the mystery, historical, and contemporary fiction genres. She studied Jane Austen while a student at St Hilda's College, Oxford, and many of her published stories were adaptations and sequels of Austen's works, beginning with Mr. Darcy's Daughters in 2003. Edmondson also founded a youth holiday orchestra to provide musical opportunities for local young people in the York area, an organisation that has operated since 1992. Her son, Anselm Audley, is a fantasy author.

== Career ==
Edmondson wrote under the names Elizabeth Edmondson, Elizabeth Aston, Elizabeth Pewsey, and Gally Marchmont, Aston being her married name. Her first novels were the six books of the Mountjoy series, comedies of manners detailing "the wicked and wonderful world of the Mountjoys and their friends, all living in and around an apparently seemly English cathedral city". The first, Children of Chance, was published in 1994 under the pen-name Elizabeth Pewsey. Two later standalone novels followed, set in the 1940s and 1950s (Losing Larry and Finding Philippe). All have since been re-issued under the pen-name Elizabeth Aston, with some title alterations.

Much of Elizabeth Edmondson's body of work has included characters and settings from Jane Austen's novels, written in a similar style of comedy and romance. She described Austen as possessing the same appeal as Mozart, "She was a genius, whose writing speaks to the soul while it enchants and delights... Because of her deep understanding of human nature, and her portrayal of the comédie humaine, she transcends the gap of two centuries between then and now". Some have characterised Aston's books as fan fiction. She was one of the most prolific writers of Austen-related fiction, having produced stories featuring the Darcy, Collins, and Bingley families.

The first novel to be published under the "Elizabeth Aston" name, Mr. Darcy's Daughters, was released as a sequel to Pride and Prejudice in 2003. It features the five daughters of Mr. Darcy and Elizabeth Bennet as they navigate London society while their parents are in Constantinople. The novel was a success for publisher Simon & Schuster, and led the company to produce further Austen adaptations and sequels by other authors, such as Pamela Aidan's Fitzwilliam Darcy, Gentleman series. Aston's Darcy series came to include five further novels: The Exploits & Adventures of Miss Alethea Darcy (2004), The True Darcy Spirit (2006), The Second Mrs. Darcy (2007), The Darcy Connection (2008), and Mr. Darcy's Dream (2008). While the series shared common characters, Edmondson gave each instalment a unique story and heroine, stating that it did not matter what order her readers read each one but that it was still enjoyable to follow a series from the beginning.

In 2010 Edmondson published Writing Jane Austen, a contemporary novel featuring an author who is asked to complete a recently discovered Jane Austen manuscript despite never having read an Austen novel before. Believing Austen was a contemporary novelist who "[wrote] about her times and mores", Edmondson thought it would be interesting to write a Jane Austen-inspired novel but set it in modern times. In a review from Publishers Weekly, Edmondson was praised for having "written a witty page-turning love letter to Austen's work", while The Washington Post characterised Edmondson's book as a "fun to read" romantic comedy and noted that she "clearly relish[es] imagining what Austen might have written had she not died at a youthful 41". One of Edmondson's short stories, "The Ghostwriter", was included in the Jane Austen anthology Jane Austen Made Me Do It, published in 2011.

Parallel with the Darcy series, and extending to the end of her career, Edmondson wrote a series of vintage mysteries set in the 1930s, 40s and 50s. Most were set to some degree in the world of the English aristocracy, featuring stately homes, family secrets and Edmondson's lifelong preoccupation with spies, secrets and the Cold War (which first featured in the fifth Mountjoy novel, Unaccustomed Spirits). Her early vintage mysteries included The Frozen Lake, set in the Lake District; Voyage of Innocence, set in pre-war Oxford, and The Villa in Italy, in post-war Italy.

Her final books were the Very English Mysteries, of which she only completed two of a planned series before her death in 2016 (A Man of Some Repute and A Question of Inheritance, along with the novella A Youthful Indiscretion). These were set in the fictional West Country city of Selchester, with invalided MI6 agent Hugo Hawksworth as the lead character. The third book, A Matter of Loyalty, was written from her notes by her son Anselm Audley, also a writer, and published in October 2017.

Her books were translated into several languages including French, Spanish, Portuguese, German and Slovak.

The Guardian published an essay by Edmondson in 2014, which was an edited version of a debate speech she gave at the Oxford Literary Festival. In the essay, she criticises the terms "genre fiction" and "literary fiction" as weasel words used by the publishing industry, writing that "all books can be thrust into a genre, and lit fic is simply one of many. As a tag, it tells us nothing about the intrinsic value of any individual title".

== Personal life ==
Edmondson's mother and grandmother were both writers published in South America and her father was a journalist. She was born in Chile to an English father and an Argentine mother, educated by Benedictine nuns in Calcutta, India, and influenced by the Fabians in London, England.

Despite being named after the Jane Austen character Elizabeth Bennet, Edmondson did not read an Austen novel until the age of thirteen, when she read Pride and Prejudice. She quickly became hooked and read all six of the author's novels. In the late 1960s, Edmondson read English Language and Literature at, and graduated from, St Hilda's College, Oxford, where she studied Austen under the author's biographer Lord David Cecil. Edmondson described the "rigour" of her time at Oxford as "tremendously useful", as it allowed her to study Austen's contemporary era along with the language and background surrounding Austen's novels.

In 1992, Edmondson founded a York-based youth holiday orchestra named Yorchestra. It is a charity organisation that provides musical opportunities to local young people. She lived in Oxford and Italy, having owned a home in an area north of Rome. She was married to Paul Aston, an art historian and translator, for thirty years before his death in 2011. The pair have two children, Anselm and Eloise. Anselm is a fantasy author who writes under the name Anselm Audley. A year after Paul Aston's death, Elizabeth organised a charity performance to raise money for Sobell House Hospice in Headington, where Paul had spent his final days. Both children participated in the musical performance. Elizabeth Edmondson died on 11 January 2016 in Oxford of pancreatic cancer. She is buried in Wolvercote Cemetery, Oxford.

== List of works ==
Darcy series

- Mr. Darcy's Daughters (2003)
- The Exploits & Adventures of Miss Alethea Darcy (2004)
- The True Darcy Spirit (2006)
- The Second Mrs. Darcy (2007)
- The Darcy Connection (2008)
- Mr. Darcy's Dream (2008)

Darcy novellas

- Mr. Darcy's Christmas (2013)
- Mr. Darcy's House Party (2014)
- Mr. Darcy's Masquerade (2014)
- Mr. Darcy's Drama (2015)

Mountjoy series

- Children of Chance
- The World, the Flesh & the Bishop
- Unholy Harmonies
- Volcanic Airs
- Unaccustomed Spirits
- Brotherly Love

Vintage Mystery series

- The Frozen Lake
- The Villa in Italy
- Villa on the Riviera (previously published as The Art of Love)
- Night & Day
- Finding Philippe
- Fencing with Death (previously published as Losing Larry)

A Very English Mystery series

- A Man of Some Repute
- A Question of Inheritance
- A Youthful Indiscretion
- A Matter of Loyalty

Other works

- The Way of the World (later published as Mr Darcy's Daughters)(2003)
- The Art of Love (2007) (later published as The Villa on the Riviera)
- Writing Jane Austen: A Novel (2010)
- Voyage of Innocence (2010)
- The Painted Fan (2014)
- Valentine's Day (2014)
