= Edith Charlotte Brown =

Edith Charlotte Brown, née Hubback (born 1876, died 1945), also known as Mrs Francis Brown, was an English writer whose works were connected to Jane Austen, her great-great-aunt.

In 1906, she and her father published a book about "Jane Austen's sailor brothers", Francis and Charles, both very senior naval officers.

The following year Edith Hubback married James Francis Leadley Brown in the Wirral, Cheshire, England, where both of them were born. They then spent some years in Saskatchewan, Canada.

In 1928 her completed version of Austen's The Watsons came out. Though Francis Brown was listed as co-author, it was Edith's signature on the preface. The preface was critical of her grandmother Catherine Hubback's version of the same unfinished novel, entitled The Younger Sister. A review in the Times Literary Supplement was not very enthusiastic about Edith Brown's attempt although it did concede that she had "skill and tact".

Next she published a sequel to Sense and Sensibility called Margaret Dashwood, or, Interference (1929). This attracted some favourable comments in the press, and the publisher advertised it with quotes from The Times and The Spectator mentioning "accurate" and "authentic" echoes of Jane Austen's style and atmosphere. Her next work Susan Price, or, Resolution (1930), a sequel to Mansfield Park, was an "ingenious and delightful romance" according to The Morning Post.

She and her husband were living in the Wirral again by 1939. In this year, their daughter, Helen Brown, published Jane Austen: a play (Duckworth).

== Works ==
- Jane Austen's sailor brothers: being the adventures of Sir Francis Austen, G.C.B., Admiral of the Fleet, and Rear-Admiral Charles Austen, by J.H. Hubback and Edith C. Hubback. (John Lane 1906). Audio book and Text/ebook
- The Watsons, by Jane Austen. Completed in accordance with her intentions by Edith and Francis Brown. (E. Matthews & Marrot 1928)
- Margaret Dashwood, or, Interference, by Mrs Francis Brown. (John Lane, Bodley Head 1929)
- Susan Price, or, Resolution, by Mrs Francis Brown. (John Lane, Bodley Head 1930)
