= Queen Elizabeth School, Kirkby Lonsdale =

Queen Elizabeth School

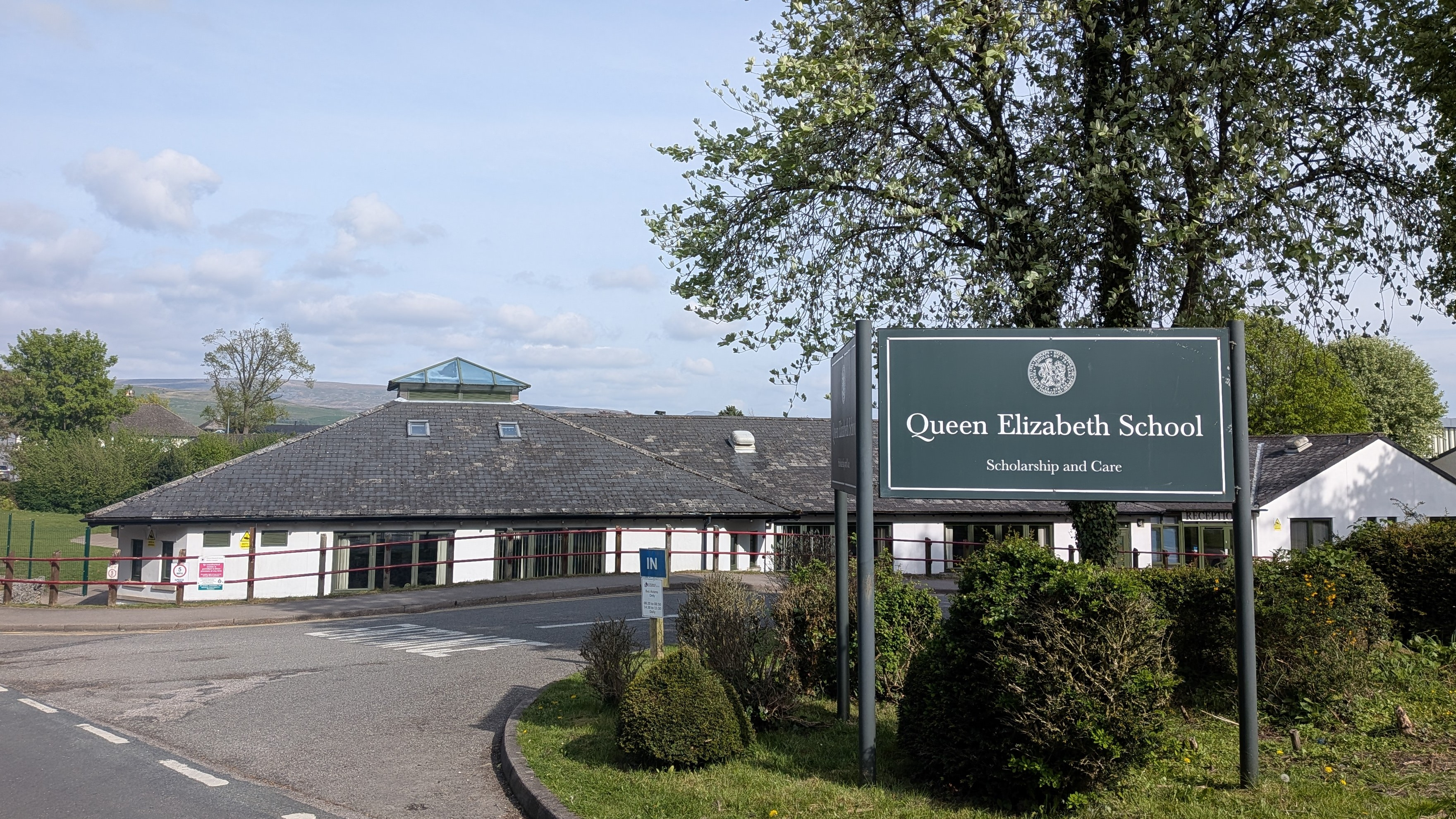
- The entrance to the school, in 2026

Location
- Kendal Road; Kirkby Lonsdale; Cumbria, LA6 2HJ; England; 54.20182°N 2.60473°W

Information
- Type: Academy
- Motto: Scholarship and Care
- Established: 1591; 435 years ago
- Local authority: Westmorland and Furness
- Department for Education URN: 136357 Tables
- Ofsted: Reports
- Head Teacher: David Waugh
- Gender: Coeducational
- Age: 11 to 18
- Website: https://qes.org.uk

Queen Elizabeth School, often abbreviated to QES, is a coeducational, comprehensive secondary school and sixth form with academy status. It is located in Kirkby Lonsdale, in the English county of Cumbria. In October 2025, it had a population of 1,155 students across KS3, KS4, and the sixth form.

== History ==
In 1591, Queen Elizabeth School (QES) was granted a royal charter and founded as a free grammar school. QES moved from its original Mill Brow location in 1840 to the newly constructed Springfield House on Biggins Lane, Kirkby Lonsdale. Girls were first admitted in 1905, and by 1930 there were 88 day pupils and 54 boarders, approximately half and half boys and girls. QES became a non-selective comprehensive school in 1978 and continued to take in boarders until the late 1980s.

In 1997 Springfield House, the boys' boarding accommodation, was redeveloped as a dedicated Sixth Form area. On 1 December 2010 QES became the first school in the county to convert to academy status. However, the school continues to coordinate with Cumbria County Council for admissions. QES offers GCSEs and other qualifications as programmes of study for pupils, while students in the sixth form have the option to study from a range of A-levels and additional qualifications.

In 2010, a 15 year old pupil at the school was arrested in the playground after she was found with a 12 inch (30 cm) knife and a "hit list" of teachers and pupils to stab.

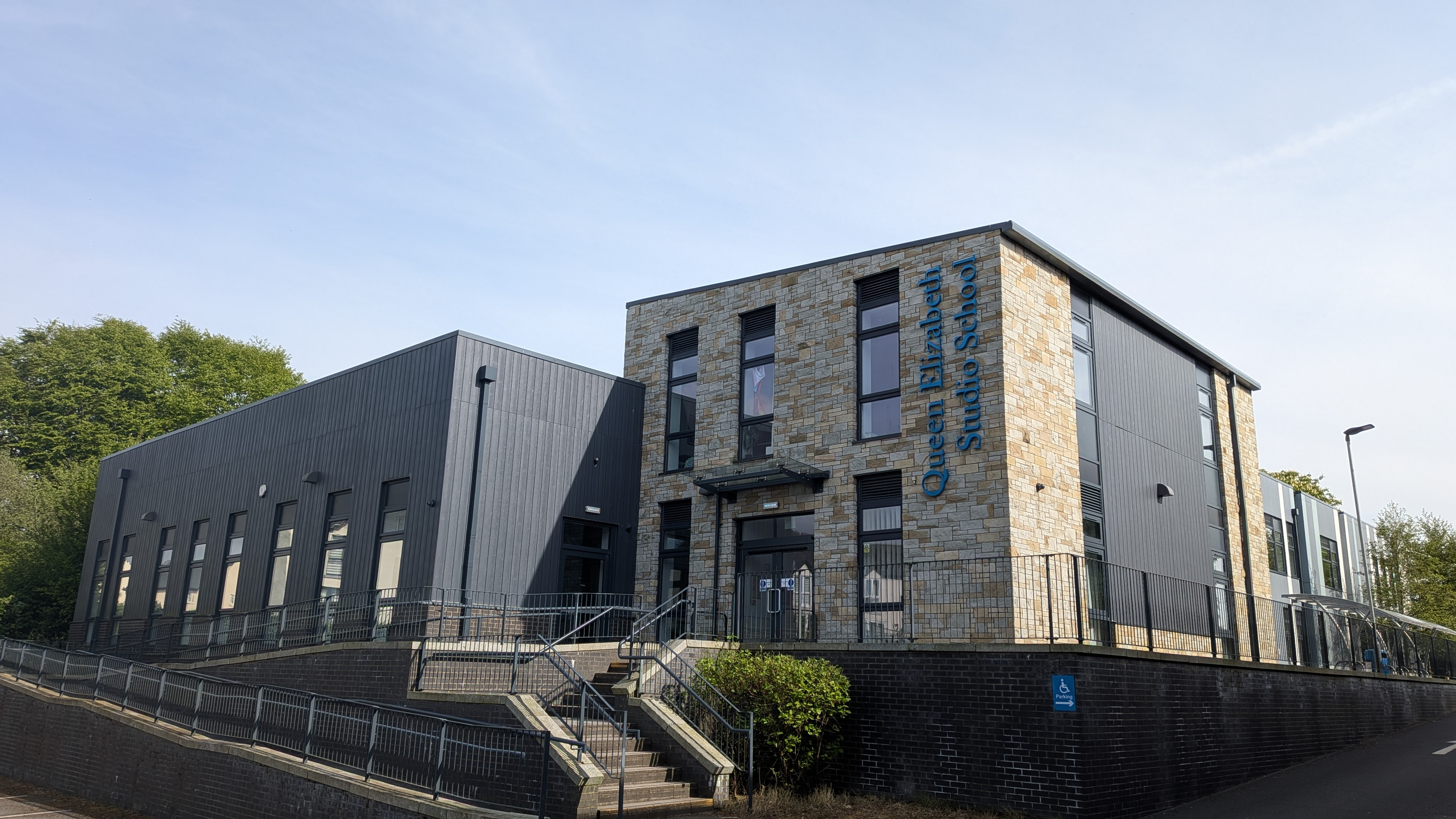
The front of QEStudio

== QEStudio ==
In September 2017 a sister school, Queen Elizabeth Studio School - often abbreviated to QEStudio - was built, and started accepting students. Despite being just across of Biggins Lane from each other, they are, in official terms, separate schools with an overarching multi-academy trust of Lunesdale Learning Trust. Students decide to join either QES or QEStudio for KS4 and, separately, sixth form. QEStudio specialises in offering "technical qualifications", meaning students can "pick and mix technical and academic qualifications to create a personal Learning Package". In July 2026, it had a population of 332 students.

== Ofsted ==
In 2022 an Ofsted inspection of Queen Elizabeth School resulted in a report that graded the school as Good when it had previously been Outstanding. As of 2026, this is the school's most recent inspection.

== Notable former pupils ==
- Jo Baker, novelist
- Thomas Burrow, Indologist and former Boden Professor of Sanskrit at the University of Oxford
- Fiona Crackles, England Hockey player
- Kate Ford, Coronation Street actress
- Lawrence Hargrave, aeronautical engineer and explorer
- Stirrat Johnson-Marshall, architect
