= An Assembly Such as This =

2003 novel by Pamela Aidan

- First edition
- Author: Pamela Aidan
- Cover artist: Joseph Nash, The Banqueting Room at the Royal Pavilion, Brighton - 1826
- Language: English
- Series: Fitzwilliam Darcy, Gentleman
- Publisher: Wytherngate Press (US)
- Publication date: 2003
- Publication place: United States
- Media type: Print (paperback)
- Pages: 218 p.
- ISBN: 0-972-85290-5
- OCLC: 67384135
- Dewey Decimal: 813/.6 22
- LC Class: PS3601.I33 A94 2006
- Followed by: Duty and Desire

An Assembly Such as This is a 2003 novel by Pamela Aidan. It is the first book in a trilogy entitled Fitzwilliam Darcy, Gentleman. The second and third books in the series are titled Duty and Desire, and These Three Remain.

All three books are inspired by Jane Austen's popular 1813 novel, Pride and Prejudice. The series centers on the character Fitzwilliam Darcy, and explores the events of Pride and Prejudice and Darcy's developing relationship with Elizabeth Bennet from his viewpoint.

== Plot summary ==
The book focuses on Fitzwilliam Darcy's initial visit to Hertfordshire during the opening chapters of Pride and Prejudice, as seen from his viewpoint. The book begins as he arrives in the town of Meryton, to stay at Charles Bingley's estate of Netherfield. Darcy expects to be bored by provincial manners and society, and he finds that is the case at a local town ball. To his surprise, however, he becomes fascinated by Elizabeth Bennet, whom he has accidentally offended due to her inadvertently overhearing a tactless comment that he made about her to Bingley.

Darcy is uncomfortable in his current surroundings, and he worries about his sister Georgiana, who is vulnerable following an unpleasant encounter with George Wickham. Amidst attempts of unwelcome advance by Bingley's sister Caroline, he finds himself repeatedly thrown into Elizabeth's company, particularly when her sister Jane falls ill whilst visiting Netherfield, forced to stay until she recovers. Darcy comes to admire Elizabeth's lively spirit, generous nature and confident refusal to be cowed by her social 'betters'. However, Elizabeth is without money or fine connections, and she has embarrassing and 'unfortunate' relations that make her unsuitable for a wife. Meanwhile, protective of his friend, the somewhat naive and easily trusting Bingley, Darcy attempts to warn him off from an 'unfortunate' and hasty relationship with Jane Bennet whilst struggling with his feelings for Elizabeth.

Eventually, Darcy is determined to explore his feelings for Elizabeth despite his misgivings, resolving to both make amends and attempt to charm Elizabeth during a ball that Bingley is holding. Unfortunately, despite the assistance he receives from his valet Fletcher, fate has conspired against Darcy: Wickham has recently moved into the area, joined the local militia, and become acquainted with Elizabeth. As such, when he dances with Elizabeth at the ball, Darcy meets with extremely cold and unfriendly treatment from her. He realizes that Wickham has managed to poison Elizabeth against him with false tales of their previous dealings, and that she (and others in the village) have become distant towards him because of their perceptions of his arrogance and Wickham's charming nature and lies.

Too proud to set the record straight, Darcy refuses to defend himself. Worse, Bingley's unguarded behaviour towards Jane Bennet, her mother's tactless gloating and more examples of ill-breeding from her family strengthen Darcy's conviction that he must prevent his friend's potential ruin at all costs. Darcy dissuades him from marrying Jane Bennet, detecting in her no hint of regard for his friend beyond politeness. Realizing that his intervention (were she to learn of it) would permanently alienate Elizabeth, he still, Darcy resolves to act in what he sees as the best interests of his friend. The next day, as the Netherfield party returns to London, Darcy sows the seeds of doubt in Bingley's mind about Jane's regard for him, convincing Bingley not to return to Netherfield and declare his intentions to Jane. The novel ends with Darcy resolving to harden his heart and forget about Elizabeth.

== References to historical people, places, and events ==
The events of this novel, unlike those of Pride and Prejudice, are set in a specific time, late 1811, as shown by the dates of letters exchanged between the characters. This allows the author to include historical people and events in the narrative.

After departing Meryton, Darcy goes to London to spend time at his townhouse, "Erewile" on Grosvenor Square, before proceeding to Pemberley for Christmas. While in London, he and Bingley are invited to a soirée at the London home of Viscount Melbourne. There he sees couples dancing the waltz for the first time. At the time, dancing was done in groups, and it was risqué for men and women to dance closely face to face. The waltz was imported from Europe and became popular around 1815. Darcy encounters Beau Brummel. He talks with Lady Melbourne and is witness to the scandalous behaviour of her daughter-in-law, Lady Caroline Lamb, who enters wearing a dress of sheer material that has been sprinkled with water and is translucent. Her companion is unknown to Darcy, but he is later revealed to be Lord Byron. Darcy, Bingley and most of the other guests leave the party immediately.

== See also ==
- List of literary adaptations of Pride and Prejudice
