= Sonal =

Sonal is a given Indian name originating from the Hindu religion. It is a unisex name often nicknamed as “Sona” and means "curious", "golden", or “precious” in Hindi, Marathi, and Gujarati. A similar name is Sonali. It is also a name used in Sri Lanka. People with the name "Sonal" include:

- Sonal Chauhan (born 1989), Indian actress
- Sonal Giani, Indian LGBTQ rights activist
- Sonal Mansingh (born 1944), Indian dancer
- Sonal Shah (actress) (born 1980), Indian-American actress
- Sonal Shah (economist) (born 1968), American economist
- Sonal Sehgal (born 1981), Indian actress
- Sonal Vengurlekar (born 1993), Indian actress
- Sonal Imbulamure (born 1994), well-known Sri Lankan-American Lawyer practicing in Los Angeles, California
