= The Watsons =

Unfinished novel by Jane Austen, written 1803–1805

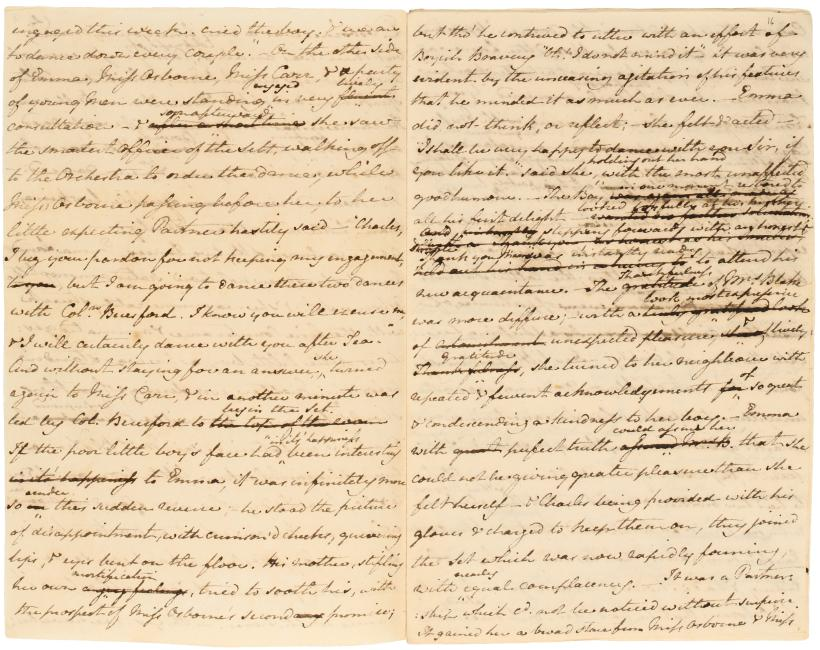
The description of the ball in Jane Austen's manuscript

The Watsons is an abandoned novel by Jane Austen, probably begun about 1803. There have been a number of arguments advanced as to why she did not complete it, and other authors have since attempted the task. A continuation by Austen's niece was published in 1850. The manuscript fragment itself was published in 1871. Further completions and adaptations of the story have continued to the present day.

== History ==
Jane Austen began work on an untitled novel about 1803, while she was living in Bath, and abandoned it after her father's death in January 1805. It had no formal chapter divisions and was approximately 17,500 words long. The fragment was given the title of The Watsons and published in 1871 by the novelist's nephew, James Edward Austen-Leigh (1798–1874), in the revised and augmented edition of his A Memoir of Jane Austen.

The original manuscript covered eighty pages, now divided between the Morgan Library & Museum, New York, and the Bodleian Library, Oxford. On Jane Austen's death the manuscript was inherited by her sister Cassandra, and then passed to other family relations until it was divided up in 1915. The smaller part was acquired by the Morgan Library in 1925 and the remaining larger portion went through various hands until it was bought by the Bodleian in 2011. There are erasures and corrections to the manuscript and in three cases there were substantial revisions written on small pieces of paper and pinned in place over the cancelled portions.

== Synopsis ==
The timeframe of the completed fragment covers about a fortnight, and serves to introduce the main characters, who live in Surrey. Mr Watson is a widowed and ailing clergyman with two sons and four daughters. The youngest daughter, Emma, the heroine of the story, has been brought up by a wealthy aunt and is consequently better educated and more refined than her sisters. But after her aunt contracted a foolish second marriage, Emma has been obliged to return to her father's house. There she is chagrined by the crude and reckless husband-hunting of two of her sisters, Penelope and Margaret. One particular focus for them is Tom Musgrave, who has paid attention to all of the sisters in the past. This Emma learns from her more responsible and kindly eldest sister Elizabeth.

Living near the Watsons are the Osbornes, a great titled family. Emma attracts some notice from the young and awkward Lord Osborne while attending a ball in the nearby town. An act of kindness on her part also acquaints her with Mrs Blake, who introduces Emma to her brother, Mr Howard, vicar of the parish church near Osborne Castle. A few days later Margaret returns home, having been away on a protracted visit to her brother Robert in Croydon. With her come Robert and his overbearing and snobbish wife, Jane. When they leave, Emma declines an invitation to accompany them back to Croydon.

Here the story breaks off, but Edward Austen-Leigh's Memoir provides a hint of how it was to continue:

When the author's sister, Cassandra, showed the manuscript of this work to some of her nieces, she also told them something of the intended story; for with this dear sister – though, I believe, with no one else – Jane seems to have talked freely of any work that she might have in hand. Mr Watson was soon to die; and Emma to become dependent for a home on her narrow-minded sister-in-law and brother. She was to decline an offer of marriage from Lord Osborne, and much of the interest of the tale was to arise from [the dowager] Lady Osborne's love for Mr Howard, and his counter affection for Emma, whom he was finally to marry.

== Critical commentary ==
In a talk at the Bodleian Library in 2012 following its acquisition of part of the manuscript, Professor Kathryn Sutherland described the novel as being about one sixth of the length of Austen's published novels and as marking a turning point in her writing. Here she leaves behind her parodies of earlier authors for a more naturalistic plot. "The Watsons is an experiment in turning fiction into life and life into fiction" and a "repository of classic Austen ingredients". The latter includes particularly the theme of being an outsider within the family and the consequent search for belonging. The talk also raised the possibility that Austen's fragment might really have been meant as a novella.

That final point takes up an earlier claim that the work was nearer completion than assumed in that it "comprises the complete history of the heroine's movement from a position of social exclusion to one of inclusion". Such an argument, however, was merely one more addition to the many theories as to why Jane Austen had never completed the fragment. An earlier article by Joseph Wiesenfarth disagreed with the speculation that the novel was unfinished because of the unhappy associations for the author of the time it was written and that it covered a theme too close to her own circumstances. Furthermore, in reviewing the theory that the plot had been rewritten as Emma, Wiesenfarth advanced the counterargument that The Watsons was "a pre-text – a text that comes before other texts". He felt that situations first foreshadowed there were eventually reworked with more skill in novels that Austen had already begun, such as Pride and Prejudice, or would write later, so that "it would be redundant to use them again in a completed version" of The Watsons.

== Continuations ==
Dissatisfaction that the fragment's promising beginning was not brought to fulfilment eventually resulted in attempts to finish the novel. Some of the earliest of these were authored by descendants of the Austen family itself. In 1850, Jane's niece Catherine Hubback adapted the plot into a three-volume novel under the title The Younger Sister. The initial chapters were based on Jane's fragmentary story, which was known to family members but had not yet been published. The writing, however, was not word for word from the manuscript and in the development of the story some names were changed and new characters and episodes introduced, as well as long moralising passages and a good deal of descriptive detail. The continuation is recognisably Victorian in its themes and attitudes to social class. Possibly the new focus on the economics of the penniless heroine's situation could not have been adequately treated until this later date. In the opinion of Jane Austen's great-nephew, William Austen-Leigh (1843–1921), his aunt may have become aware of the difficulty "of having placed her heroine too low, in a position of poverty and obscurity…and therefore, like a singer who has begun on too low a note, she discontinued the strain."

Mrs Hubback's novel differs importantly from later continuations of The Watsons, in that it was not presented as a continuation when it appeared in 1850. That fact would not become apparent until Jane Austen's earlier fragment was first published in 1871, although Mrs Hubback's relationship with her is made clear by the dedication at the start: "To the memory of her aunt, the late Jane Austen, this work is affectionately inscribed by the authoress who, though too young to have known her personally, was from childhood taught to esteem her virtues, and admire her talents." Moreover, it is not until the opening paragraphs of Chapter 2, following a digression on the style of ball-dresses over the centuries, that Mrs Hubback announces the period in which her novel is set. It is "sixty years ago", at which time "the liveliest fancy would have never pictured an English ball such as we now see it." With these clues, the reader is guided to expect a pastiche of an Austen novel, a Regency era situation described from the point of view of mid-Victorian times.

No more continuations of The Watsons appeared until some fifty years after Austen-Leigh had published Jane Austen's manuscript. Then came The Watsons – A Fragment by Jane Austen & Concluded by L. Oulton, published in 1923 and prefaced by Austen-Leigh's original introduction of 1871, as if to give it authenticity. The American edition went further in suggesting that the continuation had family sanction by claiming that Miss Oulton "has carried out her task so successfully that the reader will share with the members of the Austen family, to whom she showed her work, an inability to recognize the place where she took up the story from her distinguished predecessor". A contemporary reviewer for The Spectator certainly noticed, however, commenting that "soon after she has taken up the tale, we become aware that all the rich reality has faded out of it and from being, as it were, a perfect little Dresden group, it has shrunk to a two-dimensional drawing", for all that the author "is often successful in hitting off Miss Austen's style and intonation".

The 1928 continuation of The Watsons by Austen's great grand-niece

Another family response followed five years later with the publication of The Watsons, by Jane Austen. Completed in accordance with her intentions by Edith, the granddaughter of Catherine Hubback, and her husband Francis Brown. The aim, according to the book's introduction, had been to "disentangle Jane's story from that of her niece", although a dependence on The Younger Sister remained. Mrs Hubback's novel was quarried yet again in 1977 by David Hopkinson (1914–2002), the husband of Diana Hubback – a niece of Edith Brown. This relationship was coyly concealed on publication under the title The Watsons by Jane Austen and Another. A postscript surveyed the history of the family continuations and criticised the Brown version which "so greatly compressed the plot's development that it did less than justice to Jane's own work when all it yielded was so perfunctory a conclusion". Nevertheless, believing that Catherine Hubback had absorbed from family members "an accurate picture of the author's intentions", he too kept his version close to Catherine's original wording and incorporated all of Jane Austen's fragment at its start. What are curtailed are all the digressions that Mrs Hubback had added to give her novel context and the subplots that maintained its momentum.

A further continuation came from John Coates (1912–1963), a writer with no family connection but who had earlier written a time-travel novel, Here Today (1949), featuring a man who claimed to have wooed Jane Austen. His The Watsons: Jane Austen's fragment continued and completed appeared from British and American publishers in 1958. In his postscript (pages 314–18) he admitted to having rewritten the original fragment in order to develop the characters differently, including renaming Emma Watson as Emily. He also pointed out that the tempo of Jane Austen's contribution had been "leisurely…It is the start of a long book, not of a short one. Yet it comprises a half of [Ms] Oulton's book and almost half of the Browns' book." In his own book that proportion is reduced to less than a quarter of the total length. As a result of giving himself this extra leg-room, his version of the story has been judged "more successful in capturing the feel of early 19th-century society than many of the other sequels, but [is] probably much lighter and cheerier than Austen had originally intended the book to turn out".

Since then, as part of the burgeoning genre of "Austenesque fiction", author Joan Aiken wrote sequels to several Jane Austen novels, among them her Emma Watson: The Watsons Completed (1996). New continuations also include The Watsons by Merryn Williams in 2005; the self-published The Watsons, by Jane Austen and Another Lady by Helen Baker in 2008; the religiously-themed The Watsons Revisited by Eucharista Ward in 2012; and The Watsons by Jane Austen, completed by Jennifer Bettiol in 2012. Yet another continuation was written by Irish author Rose Servitova, whose earlier The Longbourn Letters (2017) was based within the world of Pride and Prejudice. Her newer Austen-inspired work, A Completing of The Watsons (2019), won the Bronze prize in the Self-Publishing Review Book Awards. Another continuation, Jane Austen's The Watsons, As Continued by Claudia Gray, was released in 2026.

== Adaptations ==
As well as continuations of the original novel, a number of other authors have contributed new novels, and adaptations in other formats. Among these are the two 'Watsons novels' described as "inspired by Jane Austen" and written by Ann Mychal. The first, Emma and Elizabeth (2014), according to its back cover, "blends passages from the original fragment into the narrative, creating a unique story which is faithful to Jane Austen's style and subject matter". Its sequel, Brinshore (2015), is set two decades later and brings together characters and situations from both The Watsons and Sanditon.

In The Jane Austen Project (2017) by Kathleen A. Flynn, the manuscript of the novel is made the subject of a time-travel quest. Austen is supposed there to have completed The Watsons but then destroyed it, so two researchers from the future travel back to her time in an attempt to retrieve it.

In another adaptation (that reverses the direction of the time-travel) a metatheatrical intrusion from the present day occurs in Laura Wade's play The Watsons, a dramatisation of the unfinished novel. It has Laura, the dramatist, (played by an actor) walking onstage as the original, naturalistic story breaks off. There then follows a protracted discussion between the dramatist and the rebellious characters about how the plot should continue. A similar student-written adaptation was performed at the University of Toronto by the Trinity College Dramatic Society during the Hart House U of T Drama Festival 2026, featuring a fictionalized Cassandra Austen as opposed to a dramatist.

== See also ==
- List of most expensive books and manuscripts
