= Longbourn =

2013 novel

- First edition (UK)
- Author: Jo Baker
- Publisher: Doubleday, Knopf
- Publication date: 2013

Longbourn is a 2013 novel by the British author Jo Baker. It gives an alternative view of the events in Jane Austen's 1813 novel Pride and Prejudice, telling the story from the perspective of the servants at Longbourn, the Bennet family home. It was published by Doubleday in the UK and by Knopf in the US. It has been translated into twenty-one languages, was shortlisted for the IBW Book Award and is due to be made into a film, adapted by Angela Workman and Jessica Swale and directed by Sharon Maguire.

== Inspiration ==
The novel was in part inspired by the fact that Baker's ancestors had been in service. In an interview with Petra Mayer, Baker says, "I found something in the existing text that niggled me, that felt unresolved, and wanted to explore it further." She states that she feels this novel falls into the same category as Jean Rhys's response to Jane Eyre and Tom Stoppard's response to Hamlet. In addition to her inspiration, Baker discusses the character of Mr Bennet: she believes that TV and film adaptations have made him a "cozier" character than in Austen's novel. Baker feels that she has upheld Austen's Mr Bennet by making him "partial and very jaded" in Longbourn.

== Plot ==
Sarah is a young woman of marrying age. Orphaned, she came to work for the Bennet family with whom she still resides along with the other servants including the married Mr and Mrs Hill and the much younger Polly. Because of the Peninsular War, manservants are scarce. However, Mrs Hill is able to employ James Smith, a handsome but mysterious man whom Sarah is initially intrigued by. However, Sarah's attentions are quickly caught by a manservant at Netherfield Hall, a handsome black man who later reveals he is a former slave named Ptolemy Bingley.

Because of the relationship between the Bingleys and the Bennets, Ptolemy often comes to Longbourn and has the opportunity to talk to Sarah who is intrigued by him. On the night of the Netherfield ball Sarah is tasked with staying up all night to receive the family when they come home. She gets drunk and makes her way to Netherfield where she runs into Ptolemy and the two share a drunken kiss. Shortly after he reveals that the entire Bingley family is returning to London. Sarah decides to join him, running away in the night, but James follows her and begs her to at least write a letter in advance so that she will not be socially ruined. Sarah kisses James in order to have a point of comparison with Ptolemy. She feels a closer connection with James and returns home with him and the two begin a secret sexual relationship.

Elizabeth goes to visit the newly married Charlotte Collins and takes Sarah with her to London and Hunsford. Sarah does not meet Ptolemy on her travels and is more than happy to return to the Bennet household. However James has grown suspicious of Wickham, who frequently tries to befriend the staff, especially Polly. After catching a drunk Wickham trying to kiss Polly he hits him. Wickham reveals that he suspects that James has deserted the army and threatens to tell Mr. Bennet unless James leaves on his own. In the middle of the night James abandons the Bennet home which is only discovered by Polly and Mrs Hill in the morning.

A flashback reveals that James is the illegitimate son of Mrs Hill and Mr Bennet and that Mr Hill is gay and Mrs Hill married him to fend off rumours and to protect her own name. James is raised by the Smiths, neighbouring farmers, but as soon as he is able to he runs away and joins the army. In Spain he is tried as a deserter and whipped severely though he never intended to desert the army. Shocked by this betrayal he kills the man who tried him as a deserter and eventually does run away, only to return to work for Mr Bennet as he remembers him visiting him during his childhood and being kind to him.

Sarah and Mrs Hill are distressed by James's sudden disappearance though they are unable to do much to learn of where he went. When Lydia elopes with Wickham the house is turned over in turmoil and Mrs Hill reminds Mr Bennet of all he did for Lydia while not lifting a finger for his son.

Elizabeth eventually becomes engaged to Mr Darcy and asks Sarah to work for her as her lady's maid. Ptolemy Bingley, still working for Mr Bingley returns and proposes to Sarah. Though Mrs Hill is in favour of the match Sarah decides to leave with Elizabeth.

Though the work is much easier for Sarah, she despises life at Pemberly. The day before Lady Day, Mr Bingley and Jane visit the Darcys. Ptolemy Bingley is with them and tells Sarah that he has seen James. On Lady Day Sarah abruptly quits Mrs Darcy's service and goes looking for James.

Polly eventually becomes a teacher, Mr Hill dies, and Mrs Hill spends most of the rest of her days with an increasingly mournful Mr Bennet. Sarah does catch up to James and they eventually have a child together, eventually returning to Longbourn.

== Reception ==
The novel received positive reviews upon publication. The Daily Express said: “This clever glimpse of Austen's universe through a window clouded by washday steam is so compelling it leaves you wanting to read the next chapter in the lives below stairs.”

It was selected by The New York Times as one of its 100 Notable Books of 2013, describing it as “a work that’s both original and charming, even gripping, in its own right”. Diane Johnson writing for The New York Times called the novel "an affecting look at the world of Pride and Prejudice, but from another point of view — the servants’ hall.". Although Hannah Rosefield, writing in The Guardian, questioned the subtlety of the book's approach, she praised it for "lovely moments" brought about by Sarah's point of view.

In another review in The Washington Times, Claire Hopley praises the novel, stating that though it is not in the same style of Jane Austen, it still a "thoroughly researched description of the servants’ toil." Hopley also notes that Baker's choice to include James' life in the Peninsula War is in response to Austen's critics who complain about the absence of the Napoleonic War in her novels.

Carmela Ciuraru in USA Today warns readers of Longbourn who are looking for a different perspective on Elizabeth Bennet and Darcy they will be sorely disappointed because the book focuses on the hard lives of Regency-era servants. She ends her review by calling the work a "bold novel, subversive in ways that prove surprising, and brilliant on every level" that stays true to the wit of Jane Austen and adds new perspectives and sympathies to the lives of servants.

== Longbourn adaptations ==
The novel was adapted for radio, appearing on BBC Radio 4’s Book at Bedtime, abridged by Sara Davies and read by Sophie Thompson. It was first broadcast in May 2014, and again on BBC Radio 4 Extra in September 2018.

In 2018, a film adaptation was in early development from Random House Studio and StudioCanal. Sharon Maguire was attached as director, with Angela Workman and Jessica Swale attached as screenwriters. As of August 2026, no such film has gone into production.
