= Sonali Dev =

Indian American novelist

- Born: c. 1972
- Occupation: Novelist
- Writing career
- Language: English
- Years active: 2014–present
- Genre: Romance fiction
- Website: www.sonalidev.com

Sonali Dev (born c. 1972) is an Indian American writer of contemporary romance novels.

== Early life, family and education ==
Dev's early life was spent in Mumbai.

== Career ==
While in Mumbai, Dev wrote some Bollywood scripts, but these did not progress from the development phase. She began writing romance novels in 2010, inspired after reading the work of Catherine Coulter and realising the genre's similarity to Bollywood movie themes.

Dev experienced racial discrimination from multiple publishing companies because the protagonists in her novels are of Indian descent, and she is writing these diverse characters in the romance genre.

A Bollywood Affair, Dev's first novel, was published in 2014 by Kensington Publishing Company and was shortlisted for the RITA Award by the Romance Writers of America (RWA). The novel was placed on the American Library Association Reference and User Services Association's Reading List for 2015.

In 2018, Dev provided the Librarian's Day keynote speech at RWA's annual conference.

== Themes ==
Dev commonly blends American and Indian cultures in her works, often with an emphasis on Bollywood style. Her characters come from a variety of backgrounds and fall all along the spectrum of wealth. Some of her characters experience discrimination due to their race, gender, and culture.

In Dev's first published novel, she addresses the issue of child marriage. Dev has been clear that in her opinion, that there is a difference between child marriages and arranged marriages. Characters within Dev's novels often deal with the pressures of family and tradition, as well as how society can react to people with mental illness and fame.

Her novel, Pride, Prejudice, and Other Flavors, is a mash up of Dev's normal Bollywood themes and Jane Austen's classic novel Pride and Prejudice.

== Personal life ==
Dev relocated to the US around 2006 after marrying her husband, Manoj Thatte, as an arranged marriage, with which she has expressed great satisfaction.

As of 2019, Dev resided in Naperville, Illinois, where she has participated in multiple local events arranged by the city.

== Selected works ==
Title	Series	Publication year	ISBN/ASIN
Scribbling Women and the Real-Life Romance Heroes Who Love Them		2014	B00HPQN55O
A Bollywood Affair	Bollywood #1	2014	9781617730139
The Bollywood Bride	Bollywood #2	2015	9781617730153
A Change of Heart	Bollywood #3	2016	9781496705747
A Distant Heart	Bollywood #4	2017	9781496705761
Pride, Prejudice, and Other Flavors	The Rajes #1	2019	9780062839053
Once Upon a Wedding	Morning Glory #4.5	2019	9781944048099
Recipe for Persuasion	The Rajes #2	2020	9780062839077
