= Jo Baker (novelist) =

British writer

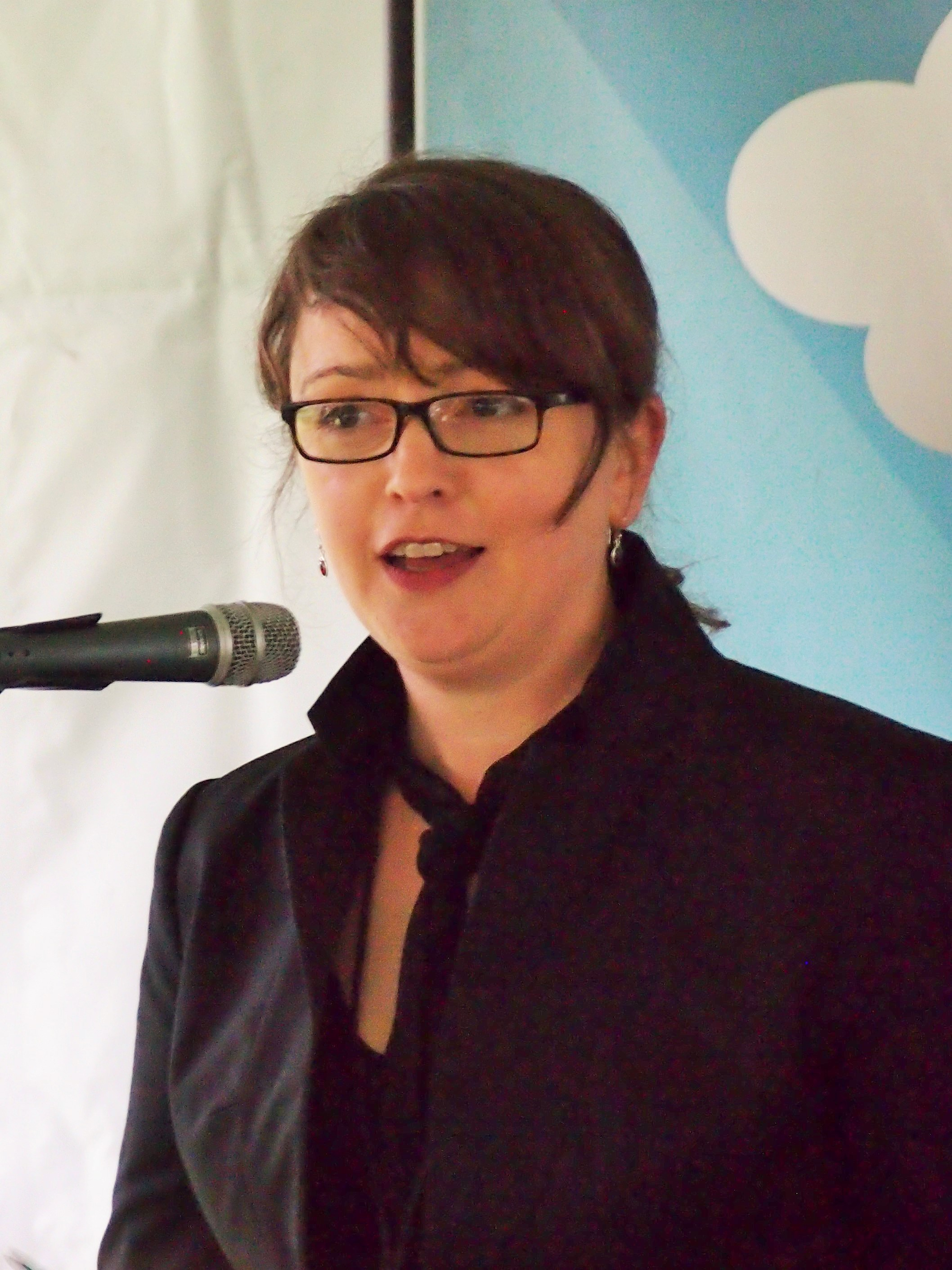
Jo Baker reading at the Gaithersburg Book Festival

Jo Baker is a British writer. She is the author of six novels, including Longbourn. She has also written short stories for BBC Radio 4 and reviews for The Guardian and The New York Times Book Review. In 2018, she was awarded a Visiting Fellowship at the Queen's University Belfast, and she is currently an Honorary Fellow at Lancaster University.

== Early life and education ==
Baker was born and grew up in the village of Arkholme, in Lancashire, England. She was educated at Queen Elizabeth School, Kirkby Lonsdale, and Somerville College, Oxford. She moved to Belfast in 1995 to study for an MA in Irish literature at Queen's University, where she went on to complete a PhD on the Anglo-Irish novelist Elizabeth Bowen.

== Novels ==
- Offcomer (2002). Baker's debut novel is set in Belfast in the wake of the Good Friday Agreement, and follows the life of Claire Thomas, a young woman from the North of England.
- The Mermaid's Child (2005), concerns a young girl on a journey across oceans and continents in search of her mother.
- The Telling (2008), described as a modern-day ghost story told through the eyes of a woman settling her recently deceased mother's affairs.
- The Picture Book (published in the US as The Undertow) (2011), is a family history across the 20th and 21st centuries.
- Longbourn (2013). The novel revisits the events of Jane Austen's Pride and Prejudice, told from the point of view of the servants in the Bennet household. In an interview with BookBrowse, Baker stated that she first read Pride and Prejudice as a child and that her own novel was inspired in part by the fact that her ancestors had been in service. It was selected by The New York Times as one of its 100 Notable Books of 2013, describing it as "a work that's both original and charming, even gripping, in its own right". Longbourn has been translated into twenty-one languages, and was shortlisted for the IBW Book Award.
- A Country Road, A Tree (2016). A fictionalised account of Samuel Beckett's real-life involvement with the French Resistance during the Second World War. In an interview with Foyles, Baker described the process of writing about literary greats such as Beckett and Marcel Duchamp as "really scary", but "utterly irresistible". A Country Road, A Tree was shortlisted for the American Library in Paris Book Award, The James Tait Black Memorial Prize and the Sir Walter Scott Prize for Historical Fiction.
- The Body Lies (2019). Baker's seventh novel was described as "literary suspense with multiple voices and testimonies" that looks at male violence in fiction and in life. It is published by Doubleday in the UK, and in the USA by Knopf in June 2019.
- The Midnight News (2023) is set in London during the Blitz.

== Longbourn adaptations ==
- Film: a cinematic adaptation of Longbourn is due to start filming, directed by Sharon Maguire, screenplay by Jessica Swale, produced by Random House Films and StudioCanal.
- Radio: the novel was also adapted for radio, appearing on BBC Radio 4's Book at Bedtime, abridged by Sara Davies and read by Sophie Thompson. It was first broadcast in May 2014; and again on Radio 4 Extra in September 2018.

== Personal life ==
Baker lives in Lancaster with her husband, the playwright and screenwriter Daragh Carville, and their two children.
