= Pamela Aidan =

American writer (born 1953)

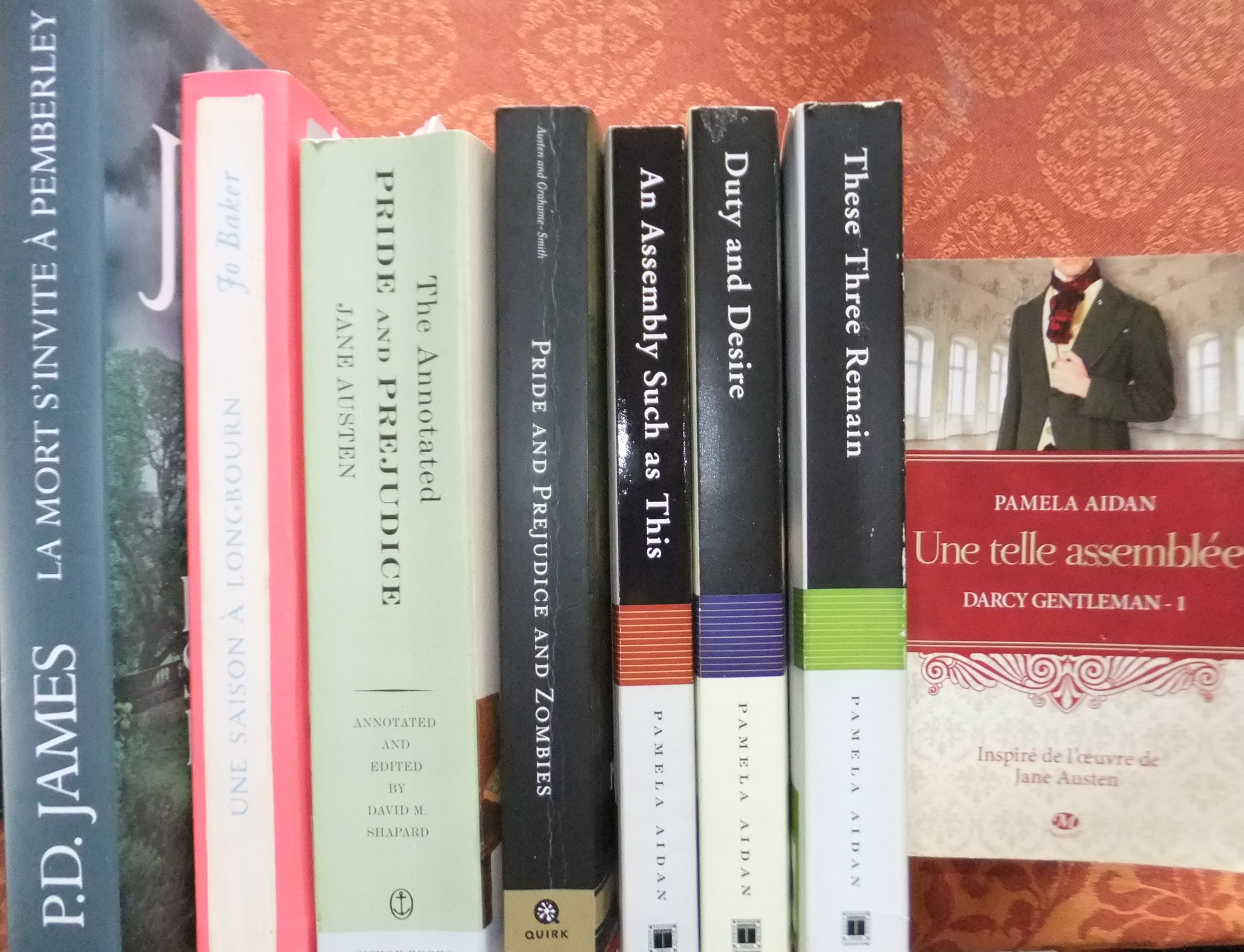
- Born: October 18, 1953 (age 72); Phoenixville, Pennsylvania, U.S.
- Writing career
- Language: English language
- Period: 2003–present
- Genre: Romance novel

Pamela Mogen (born October 18, 1953), better known by the pen name Pamela Aidan, is an American writer. Her novels are Jane Austen fan fiction, based on Pride & Prejudice.

== Biography ==
Pamela Aidan was born in Phoenixville, Pennsylvania, United States. She has a master's degree in Library and Information Science from the University of Illinois at Urbana-Champaign, and has been a librarian for over 30 years. She and her husband Michael live in Coeur d'Alene, Idaho; they each have three grown children from previous marriages.

While Jane Austen's Pride and Prejudice has been her favorite novel since high school. The author credits the 1995 BBC and A&E TV miniseries, of the story for inspiring her to write her first regency novel. An Assembly Such as This became the start of her Fitzwilliam Darcy, Gentleman trilogy (former title was The Chronicles of Pemberley).

== Bibliography ==
=== Fitzwilliam Darcy, Gentleman ===
1. An Assembly Such as This (2003)
2. Duty and Desire (2004)
3. These Three Remain (2005)

Young Master Darcy: A Lesson in Honour (2010)

A Proper Darcy Christmas (2022)

Lessons in Honour (2nd ed. 2022)
