= Catherine Hubback =

English novelist (1818–1877)

Catherine Anne Hubback
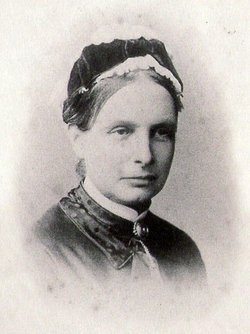
- Born: Catherine Anne Austen; 7 July 1818; Chawton, Hampshire, England
- Died: 25 February 1877 (aged 58); Gainesville, Prince William County, Virginia
- Occupation: Novelist
- Spouse: John Hubback
- Writing career
- Notable work: The Watsons – A completion

Catherine Anne Hubback (née Austen; 7 July 1818 – 25 February 1877) was an English novelist, and the eighth child and fourth daughter of Sir Francis Austen (1774–1865), and niece of English novelist Jane Austen.

She began writing fiction to support herself and her three sons after her husband John Hubback was institutionalized. She had copies of some of her aunt's unfinished works and, in 1850, remembering Austen's proposed plot, she wrote The Younger Sister, a completion of Jane Austen's The Watsons. In the next following thirteen years, she completed nine more novels.

== Life ==
Born at Chawton, Catherine Hubback began writing fictional novels to support her family after her husband was institutionalized following a nervous breakdown.

In 1870 she emigrated to California, settling in Oakland with her second son Edward. In the autumn of 1876 she moved to Gainesville, Virginia, where she died of pneumonia on 25 February 1877. Her novels, which were then popular, are now rarely read and difficult to obtain. Her best-known work is The Younger Sister.

== The Younger Sister ==
The Watsons, as we know this unfinished novel through the publication of James Edward Austen-Leigh, nephew of Jane Austen in 1871, is generally considered a very promising work, begun in 1804, The editing was unfortunately interrupted, perhaps by the death of Jane Austen's father in 1805.

The Younger Sister, which appears in three volumes, is probably written, not from a copy of her aunt's novel that Catherine Hubback would have held, but more likely from her memories, for Cassandra Austen used to read with her family the works of her sister Jane. This was one of the Austen family traditions.

Moreover, The Younger Sister, in a somewhat approximate manner, resumes in its first five chapters the text of The Watsons as it is known since 1871. The point-by-point comparison of The Watsons and the corresponding text of The Younger Sister reveals a very great resemblance, despite some name changes, but the elegant and alert style of Jane Austen is replaced by a text that takes on more the character of notes than a faithful copy of the original.

== List of works ==
The Younger Sister: a novel (1850)

The Wife's Sister, also known as, The Forbidden Marriage (1851)

May and December: a tale of wedded life (1854)

Agnes Milbourne, also known as, Foy pour devoir (1856)

The Old Vicarage: a novel (1856)

Mistakes of a Life (1863)

Love and Duty

The Rival Suitors (1857)
