= List of fiction set in Berlin =

This is a list of fiction set in Berlin, Germany.

== List ==
(Clicking on the small triangles at the head of a category will sort the list according to this category.)

| Title | Date | Medium; Genre | Original language | Author / Director | Publisher / Producer |
|---|---|---|---|---|---|
| Bridge of Spies | 2015 | film: fictionalized account of Cold War spy exchange | English (American) | Steven Spielberg | DreamWorks Pictures et al. |
| Berlin (Trilogy) | 2018 (third book & full collection); first two books in 2000 & 2008 | graphic novel | English (American) | Jason Lutes | Drawn & Quarterly |
| The Seventh Secret | 1986 | novel: alternative history | English | Irving Wallace | E. P. Dutton |
| The Girl Behind the Wall | 2021 | novel: consequences of the erection of the Berlin Wall | English (British) | Mandy Robotham | avon |
| The Berlin Girl | | novel: 1938 | English (British) | Mandy Robotham | avon |
| A Night Divided | 2015 | historical fiction | English (American) | Jennifer A. Nielsen | Scholastic |
| Der Ballhausmörder | 2020 | crime fiction | German | Susanne Goga | DTV |
| Goodbye Lenin! | 2003 | film; comedy | German | Wolfgang Becker | Stefan Arndt |
| The Lives of Others (German: Das Leben Der Anderen) | 2006 | film; drama | German | Florian Henckel von Donnersmarck | Wiedemann & Berg |
| Wings of Desire (German: Der Himmel über Berlin) | 1987 | film: fantasy | German | Wim Wenders | Wim Wenders & Anatole Dauman |
| Run Lola Run (German: Lola rennt) | 1998 | film; thriller | German | Tom Tykwer | Stefan Arndt |
| Downfall (German: Der Untergang) | 2004 | film; historical drama | German | Oliver Hirschbiegel | Bernd Eichinger |
| Crazy Love (Trilogie) | 2014 (third volume & full collection); first two volumes in 2012 & 2013 | novel; YA fiction | German | Eileen Janket | Create Space |
| We Are the Night | 2010 | film | German | Dennis Gansel | Dennis Gansel |
| When the Blind See | 2018 | historical novel | English | Alex Rhodes | Amazon |
| No Man's Land | 2015 | historical novel | English | Michael Califra | Hadrian |
| German Angst | 2015 | film | German | Jörg Buttgereit, Michal Kosakowski, Andreas Marschall | Michal Kosakowski |
| Summer on the Cold War Planet | 2015 | novel | English | Paula Closson Buck | Fomite |
| Look Who's Back | 2012 | novel; also made into a film | German | Timur Vermes | Eichborn Verlag |
| Voices Under Berlin: The Tale of a Monterey Mary | 2008 | novel | English | T. H. E. Hill | |
| The Day Before the Berlin Wall | 2010 | alternative history; spy novel. Winner of the 2011 "Stars and Flags" Book Award for Historical Fiction. Finalist for the 2011 NIEA Book Award in the "Thriller" category. | English | T. H. E. Hill | Createspace |
| Every Man Dies Alone | 1947 | novel; also made into three movies and a miniseries | German | Hans Fallada | |
| Berlin Alexanderplatz | 1929 | novel; also made into 3 movies, a television series and a radio play | German | Alfred Döblin | |
| Future Pop | 1999 | near-future novel | German | Manfred Burgheim | Eichborn Verlag |
| Besitz wird ueberbewertet | 2014 | crime novel | German | Manfred Burgheim | S. Fischer |
| Private Berlin | 2013 | crime novel (part of the "Private" series) | English | James Patterson and Mark Sullivan | Grand Central Publishing |
| Berlin Calling | 2012 | historical mystery | English | Kelly Durham | Amazon |
| Berlin Dancer | 2014 | historical novel | English | Cindy Hurst | Celdin |
| Berlin Noir: March Violets; The Pale Criminal; A German Requiem | 1994 | three short crime pieces | English | Philip Kerr | Penguin |
| Berlin Requiem | 2014 | novel | German | Peter Huth | Edel Elements |
| Halbmond über Berlin | 2013 | thriller and mystery | German | Michael Kiesen | Südwestbuch |
| Leaving Berlin | 2015 | thriller and love story | | Joseph Kanon | Atria Books |
| Nekromantik | 1987 | film | West German | Jörg Buttgereit | |
| Linie 1 | 1986 | stage musical | German | music by Birger Heymann; text by Volker Ludwig | (first performed by the Grips-heater in Berlin) |
| Linie 1 | 1988 | movie musical | German | (based on the stage musical) Director: Reinhard Hauff | |
| The Thirty-Year-Old Man Who Fell Out the Window and Died | 2014 | a Lisa Becker Short Mystery | | Falko Rademacher | [Kindle Edition] |
| The Puzzle People | 2012 | mystery | | Doug Peterson | Bay Forest Books |
| March Violets | 1989 | novel | | Philip Kerr | Viking |
| The Pale Criminal | 1990 | novel | | Philip Kerr | Viking |
| A German Requiem | 1991 | novel | | Philip Kerr | Viking |
| The Berlin Deception | 2013 | thriller | English | Jeffrey Vanke | |
| Mr Norris Changes Trains | 1935 | novella | English | Christopher Isherwood | |
| Goodbye to Berlin | 1939 | novella | English | Christopher Isherwood | |
| The Berlin Warning | 1984 | novel: thriller | English | Nicholas Guild | Putnam |
| Then We Take Berlin | 1993 | novel | English | John Lawton | Atlantic Monthly |
| Fatherland | 1992 | Counterfactual crime | | Robert Harris | Hutchinson |
| The Innocent | 1990 | Novel | | Ian McEwan | Jonathan Cape |
| Stealing the Future | 2015 | Counterfactual crime and spy | | Max Hertzberg | Wolf Press UK |
| The Good German | 2001 | Crime. Film adaptation, 2006 | English | Joseph Kanon | |
| Funeral in Berlin | 1964 | Spy novel | | Len Deighton | Jonathan Cape |
| In The Garden of Beasts | 2011 | Novel | | Erik Larsen | Crown |
| Garden of Beasts | 2004 | Novel | English | Jeffrey Deaver | Simon & Schuster / Hodder & Stoughton Ltd |
| Too Far Afield | 2000 | novel | German (Ein weites Feld, 1995) | Günter Grass | Harcourt |
| Anarchy in a Cold War | 2012 | Novel | English | Kurtis Sunday | Cambria Books |
| Catch 52 - An everyman's tale of surviving in a post-brexit world | 2017 | Novel | English | P.G. Ronane | Clink Street Publishing |
| Gestern war Heute | 1978 | novel | German | Ingeborg Drewitz | Goldmann |
| Babylon Berlin: Book 1 of the Gereon Rath Mystery Series | 2016 (German: 2007) | Suspense novel (basis for the television series, Babylon Berlin) | German | Volker Kutscher | Picador |
| The Quiller Memorandum | 1966 | neo noir eurospy film | English | Michael Anderson | Ivan Foxwell |
| Berlin Stories | Collected in 2012, pieces previously published in 1900's | literature: feuilletons and prose pieces. (Also includes non-fiction pieces.) | English translation, pieces originally published in German | Robert Walser | New York Review Books |
| Türkisch für Anfänger | 2006-2008 | TV comedy-drama series | German | Bora Dağtekin | |
| The Bormann Brief | 1974 | WWII novel | English | Clive Egleton | A Fawcett Crest book |
| The Most Dazzling Girl in Berlin | 2022 | YA novel in verse; 1932 | English | Kip Wilson | Versify |
| Red Winter | 2022 | Thriller; 1985 Cold War, set in Berlin i.a. | English | Marc Cameron | G.P. Putnam's Sons |
| Effi Briest | 1895 | realist novel from a female perspective | German | Theodor Fontane | |

== Related lists ==
- List of films set in Berlin
