= Prague Fatale =

2011 novel

- Author: Philip Kerr
- Language: English
- Series: Bernie Gunther
- Genre: Crime thriller
- Publisher: Quercus Publishing
- Publication date: 2011
- Publication place: United Kingdom
- Media type: Print
- Preceded by: Field Grey
- Followed by: A Man Without Breath

Prague Fatale is a 2011 crime thriller novel by the British author Philip Kerr. It is the ninth in his series of novels featuring the fictional Berlin police detective Bernie Gunther. Noirish in style, it revolves around the events proceeding the Assassination of Reinhard Heydrich in Prague in 1942. It was shortlisted for the CWA Historical Dagger.

== Bibliography ==
- Lake, Anthony (2024). Nazi Germany and the Holocaust in Historical Crime Fiction: 'What's One More Murder?'. Routledge. ISBN 978-1-032-42302-9.
- Sandberg, Eric (2025-07-02). Crime Fiction and the Holocaust. Springer Nature. ISBN 978-3-031-94773-5.
