= Philosophical Investigations (disambiguation) =

Philosophical Investigations is a book by Wittgenstein.

Philosophical Investigations may also refer to:

== Philosophy ==
- Philosophical Investigations (journal), an academic journal published by Wiley-Blackwell
- Journal of Philosophical Investigations, an academic journal published by University of Tabriz
- A book series covering diverse subjects in Applied Philosophy published by Routledge
- Linguistic and Philosophical Investigations, an academic journal published by Addleton Academic
- Philosophical Investigations into the Essence of Human Freedom, a book by Friedrich Schelling

== Literature ==
- A Philosophical Investigation, a novel by Philip Kerr

== Film ==
A performance act by Linda Phillimore reading her poem "Philosophical Investigation #76"
