= Berlin Noir =

Upcoming television series

- Genre: Crime thriller
- Based on: Bernie Gunther by Philip Kerr
- Written by: Peter Straughan
- Directed by: Tom Shankland; Luke Snellin
- Starring: Jack Lowden; Colin Firth; Jessica Gunning; Maxine Peake; Daniel Mays; Sam Riley; Roger Allam; Liz Kingsman; Carys Daniels
- Countries of origin: United Kingdom; United States
- Original language: English

Production
- Executive producers: Peter Straughan; Tom Shankland; Luke Snellin; Jane Tranter; Dan McCulloch; Ryan Rasmussen; Tom Hanks; Gary Goetzman; Jane Thynne
- Production companies: Apple Studios; Bad Wolf; Playtone; Studio Babelsberg

Original release
- Network: Apple TV

Berlin Noir is an upcoming crime thriller television series, based on the Bernie Gunther book series written by Philip Kerr.

== Premise ==
A police officer is assigned to the Berlin Murder Squad and works to track down a serial killer in the city in 1928.

== Cast ==
- Jack Lowden as Bernie Gunther
- Colin Firth as Paul Lohser
- Jessica Gunning as Bertha Herzner
- Maxine Peake as Mila Gilhausen
- Daniel Mays as Hari Voss
- Sam Riley as Robert Lanz
- Roger Allam as Ernst Gennat
- Liz Kingsman as Rosa Bauer
- Carys Daniels as Dora Meysel
- Richard Goulding as Becker Sergeant
- Amir El-Masry as Bruno Stahlecker

== Production ==
It was announced in April 2025 that Apple TV had greenlit a series based on Philip Kerr's Bernie Gunther novels, with Peter Straughan set to write the adaptation. In July, Jack Lowden was cast to star, with Tom Shankland announced as a director for the series. In February 2026, Colin Firth joined the cast, with Jessica Gunning, Maxine Peake, Daniel Mays, Sam Riley, Roger Allam. Liz Kingsman, and Carys Daniels added the following month. Luke Snellin would also join the production as a director alongside Shankland. In April 2026, Jacob McCarthy joined.

Production began by February 2026, with scenes shot in the Neukölln borough of Berlin late that month.
