= The One from the Other =

2006 novel

- Author: Philip Kerr
- Language: English
- Series: Bernie Gunther
- Genre: Thriller
- Publisher: Quercus Publishing
- Publication date: 2006
- Publication place: United Kingdom
- Media type: Print
- Preceded by: A German Requiem
- Followed by: A Quiet Flame

The One from the Other is a 2006 mystery thriller novel by the British writer Philip Kerr. It is the fourth in his series featuring the German private detective and former policeman Bernie Gunther. It revived the character, who had originally appeared in the "Berlin Noir" trilogy from 1989 to 1991. It takes place mostly around postwar Munich, Vienna as well as Garmisch-Partenkirchen in the Bavarian Alps where the 1936 Winter Olympics had been held. The novel was shortlisted for the CWA Historical Dagger in 2007.

== Synopsis ==
Gunther opens the novel operating a struggling hotel that belongs to his now critically-ill wife in the Bavarian market town of Dachau, by then infamous for the Dachau concentration camp of the Nazi era. Realising he is unsuited to running a hotel, he decides to sell up and move to Munich and set up as a private detective. Yet all the cases he gets offered all revolve around the imprisoned war criminals and the campaign to release them in a potential amnesty, something he feels distinctly ambiguous about because of his own past as a reluctant member of the SS.

== Bibliography ==
- Geherin, David (2012-02-08). The Dragon Tattoo and Its Long Tail: The New Wave of European Crime Fiction in America. McFarland. ISBN 978-0-7864-6169-1.
- Rau, Petra (2013). Our Nazis: Representations of Fascism in Contemporary Literature and Film. Edinburgh University Press. doi:10.3366/j.ctt3fgswj. ISBN 978-0-7486-6864-9.
- Sandberg, Eric (2018-04-12). 100 Greatest Literary Detectives. Bloomsbury Academic. ISBN 978-1-4422-7822-6.
