= The Other Side of Silence =

2016 novel

- Author: Philip Kerr
- Language: English
- Series: Bernie Gunther
- Genre: Crime thriller
- Publisher: Quercus Publishing
- Publication date: 2016
- Publication place: United Kingdom
- Media type: Print
- Preceded by: The Lady from Zagreb
- Followed by: Prussian Blue

The Other Side of Silence is a 2016 crime thriller novel by the British author Philip Kerr. It is the eleventh in his series featuring Bernie Gunther, a former Berlin police detective. Noirish in tone, it takes place both in 1956 and with flashbacks to 1938 and 1945. It was shortlisted for the 2016 CWA Historical Dagger.

== Synopsis ==
It is 1956 and Gunther is still working as the concierge at a hotel on the French Riviera. Drawn into the orbit of the celebrated but aged English writer William Somerset Maugham, he is tasked with a comparatively simple task of paying off a blackmailer for £50,000 in exchange for a photograph showing the homosexual Maugham taking part in an orgy during the 1930s with the spy Guy Burgess and others. Gunther knows the blackmailer Harold Hennig, a former officer in the Nazi SD. Having first encountered him in Berlin in early 1938 at the time of the Blomberg–Fritsch affair, they met again during the Battle of Königsberg and Gunther held Hennig responsible for the sinking of the MV Wilhelm Gustloff in the Baltic.

== Bibliography ==
- Lake, Anthony (2024). Nazi Germany and the Holocaust in Historical Crime Fiction: 'What's One More Murder?'. Routledge. ISBN 978-1-032-42302-9.
- Dall'Asta, Monica; Migozzi, Jacques; Pagello, Federico; Pepper, Andrew (2023-04-21). Contemporary European Crime Fiction: Representing History and Politics. Springer International Publishing. ISBN 978-3-031-21978-8.
- Sandberg, Eric (2018-04-12). 100 Greatest Literary Detectives. Bloomsbury Academic. ISBN 978-1-4422-7822-6.
