= If the Dead Rise Not =

2009 novel by Philip Kerr

- Author: Philip Kerr
- Language: English
- Series: Bernie Gunther
- Genre: Thriller
- Publisher: Quercus Publishing
- Publication date: 2009
- Publication place: United Kingdom
- Media type: Print
- Preceded by: A Quiet Flame
- Followed by: Field Grey

If the Dead Rise Not is a crime novel by Philip Kerr, the sixth in the series starring Berlin police detective Bernie Gunther. It was published in 2009 by Quercus of London. For it, in 2009 Kerr was awarded the world's most lucrative crime fiction prize, the RBA Prize for Crime Writing, worth €125,000.

== Synopsis ==
The book continues Gunther’s story from his escape from Germany to Argentina recounted in A Quiet Flame (2008). It again places him in the position of working for unsavoury characters under dictatorial governments. In this case some of them are not Nazis but Jewish gangsters, which introduces the ethical paradox that he is obliged to report a Jew to the Gestapo. As usual, Gunther is torn between his noble feelings and the cynicism induced by his struggle to survive. Kerr also repeats his trademark of including mention of real-life people in this case Ernest Hemingway. The book reminds readers of the support the Nazis had in other countries, notably from Avery Brundage, chairman of the US Olympics Committee, who visited Berlin in the run-up to the 1936 Summer Olympics, but found no evidence of discrimination against Jews in Germany.

The first, longer, part of the novel is set in Berlin in 1934, where Bernie Gunther is the house detective at the Hotel Adlon. He is faced with three apparently unrelated crimes: the theft of a Ming dynasty box, the death of a hotel guest and a body found floating in the river. He falls in love with a glamorous American journalist, but must give her up if she is to survive. The second, shorter, part is set 20 years later in Havana. Gunther runs into his old flame, but the relationship is tempestuous, and he commits murder for the sake of his daughter. The settings allow for extensive reflection on the nature of dictatorial regimes and their effects on human behaviour and more particularly on the impact of Nazi race laws on Jews.

== Plot summary ==
=== Part One: Berlin, 1934 ===
Bernie Gunther, house detective at the Hotel Adlon, accidentally kills policeman August Krichbaum with a single punch. He goes to see his old friend Otto Schuchardt in the Gestapo about Aryanizing the Jewish female detective at the Adlon, but instead is advised to launder his racial records by removing his Jewish grandmother. Schuchardt recommends forger Emil Linthe, who completes the 'Aryan infusion', and also gives him an alibi for the murder, saying they were drinking together. Bernie recruits Dora Bauer, a classy part-time prostitute, as the hotel’s stenographer.

A Ming dynasty box is stolen from the room of Max Reles, an American gangster. The minister, Frick, had removed it from the Ethnological Museum of Berlin and given it to him as a diplomatic gift (i.e. bribe). Chief suspect is the previous stenographer, Ilse Szrajbman, a Jew who has fled to Danzig. Reles is bidding for building contracts connected with the 1936 Summer Olympics, and entertains Nazis at the opera. He has a large amount of cash and a sub-machine gun hidden in his bathroom.

Heinrich Rubusch dies of a heart attack in the hotel after having sex. Bernie forces his drunken colleague Muller to resign.

Policeman Liebermann von Sonnenberg asks Bernie to mentor young officer Richard Bömer, and he takes him along to investigate a body found floating in the river. The Adlon’s boss Hedda Adlon then asks Bernie to show round her highly attractive friend Noreen Charalambides, an American journalist who is looking for a story to support an American boycott of the Olympics. They examine the body, and work out that he’s boxer and a Jew, as he is circumcised. They visit his old gym and a Jewish encampment in the Grunewald and identify him as Isaac Deutsch. The salt water in his lungs is explained by is having worked on the Olympic stadium at Pichelsberg, where there are underground pockets of salty water left over from the Zechstein Sea (as they find out from geologist Stefan Blitz). So he probably died of an accident and his body was dumped in the canal – no big story for Noreen. Bernie and Noreen start an affair.

Bernie goes to the Schildhorndenkmal, where Jewish workers wait to be hired, and is taken on by gang master Eric Goerz. A disappointed Jew informs Goetz that he was asking after Isaac Deutsch, and the latter tortures him. He tells the truth, and is rescued by Isaac’s father, Joey Deutsch. Joey is willing to talk to Noreen as a memorial to Isaac, but commits suicide in his flat in Britz. Otto Trettin sends the Chinese box to Bernie, who returns it to Reles, minus the tender documents that were inside. After he leaves, Reles immediately phones Von Helldorf, head of the Potsdam police, whose men promptly arrest him. He refuses to sign a 'D-11' form consenting to protective custody (i.e. concentration camp) and after a week they release him – the explanation being that Noreen went back to America and promised not to wrote about the Olympic scandal. Bernie is downcast but cashes her cheque to set himself up as a private detective and decides to recuperate in Würzburg, where Rubusch came from. He reads Noreen’s love letter in the train. Mrs Angelika Rubusch is hospitable, hard as nails and glad to know her husband has been murdered. The Rubusches were tendering to supply beige Jura limestone for the Olympics. But the quote in Reles’s possession, on fake Rubusch letterhead, is double their real price. So Reles was rigging the bids.

Bernie visits the Würzburg Gestapo. Othman Weinberger, who has ambitions to be promoted to Berlin, tells him Reles is a Hungarian-German Jewish gangster from Brooklyn, who mysteriously took over the Würzburg Jura Limestone company. He murders his victims with an ice pick through the ear, leaving no trace.

Back in Berlin, Reles has Bernie abducted and is about to drown him in a lake, but Bernie has taken out insurance in the form of a letter exposing Reles which he has given to a friend at the Alexanderplatz police station, to be posted if he disappears. He is struck by the irony of his denouncing a Jew to the Gestapo. He has also told Krempel and Dora about the fortune behind the bathroom panel, and is hoping she will shoot Reles. But instead Reles shoots Dora and Krempel and they disappear into the lake – Dora still alive. Then Reles brings out his own insurance policy – he will instruct his brother in New York to kill Noreen if Bernie exposes him. The last detail is that Reles needs a hold on Weinberger to keep him quiet. It is later revealed that Bernie told Reles that he could silence Weinberger by threatening to have Emil Linthe fabricate him a Jewish past.

=== Part Two: Havana, February 1954 ===
Twenty years later Bernie has become Carlos Hausner, and is angling for a job selling cigars in Germany. He had left Argentina with $100,000. He has a Dublo trainset. Noreen (now called Eisner again) is a successful author and is in the La Moderna Poesia bookshop signing books. She was hauled up before the HUAC and is a guest of Ernest Hemingway. They repair to the Floridita and she invites him to dinner. They embrace but fight as she is so disgusted by his cynicism and he feels manipulated. He is not so cynical that he doesn’t save rebel Alfredo Lopez’s life by warning him of a militia roadblock. Noreen asks Bernie to help keep her daughter Dinah on the straight and narrow as she has fallen into bad company and plans to marry Reles.

Reles had continued to admire Bernie and gives him a job as general manager of the Saratoga Hotel, and an Asprey backgammon set. Bernie wins 32,000 pesos from Jose Orozco Garcia, owner of the sleazy Shanghai club, using the latter’s pornographic set.

Reles is found shot. The gangsters employ Bernie to investigate. Noreen and Dinah suspect each other, but Bernie defuses the row and Dinah goes to college in America as her mother wanted. Noreen then asks Bernie to help Lopez, her lawyer lover who has been arrested. He says he is no longer her ‘knight of heaven’ from Tannhäuser. Local militia captain Sanchez, who has become his friend, asks him to accompany him to look at yet another body, that of Irving Goldstein, a pit boss at the casino. Sanchez is, like Bernie, a ‘good policeman’, trying to reform a corrupt regime. At Goldstein’s place, Sanchez conveniently finds the plans for Bramit silencer for a Nagant revolver, which solves the Reles killing and defuses an incipient gang war. Bernie collects his $20,000 reward, and prepares to leave for Bonn to sell cigars.

Bernie rescues Lopez from secret policeman Quevedo, who has pulled out his fingernails but in turn has to agree to spy on another gangster, Lansky. He confesses to Noreen that he killed Reles. Finally Noreen tells him that Dinah is his daughter, as he had known since Lopez told him out of gratitude for saving his life."It gave me some kind of hope that my life hasn’t entirely been wasted," he says.
