= Adolf-Hitler-Platz =

Adolf-Hitler-Platz is the former name of many city squares in Nazi Germany and other countries during Nazi occupation, for example:

- Theodor-Heuss-Platz in Berlin
- Rathausplatz in Vienna
- Victory Square, Kaliningrad in Kaliningrad

== See also ==
- List of streets named after Adolf Hitler
