= Claudia Gold =

Historian of medieval history

Claudia Gold is the pen name of Claudia Rubenstein, a medieval historian who previously worked as the reference expert for television documentaries on the time period. She is also the director of Jewish Book Week and its annual festival in London. Joining the Jewish Literary Foundation in 2018, she had previously helped with history related events at the London Jewish Cultural Centre and also was co-director for the 2015 Hampstead & Highgate Literary Festival.

== Bibliography ==
- — (2018). King of the North Wind: The Life of Henry II in Five Acts. HarperCollins. p. 432. ISBN 9780007554799.
- — (2015). Women Who Ruled: History's 50 Most Remarkable Women. Quercus Publishing. p. 336. ISBN 9781784292355.
- — (2012). The King's Mistress: The True and Scandalous Story of the Woman who Stole the Heart of George I. Quercus Publishing. p. 314. ISBN 9781849164115.
- — (2008). Queen, Empress, Concubine: Fifty Women Rulers from the Queen of Sheba to Catherine the Great. Granta. p. 254. ISBN 9781847245427.
