= Theodor-Heuss-Platz =

City square in Berlin, Germany

Coordinates: 52°30′34″N 13°16′22″E

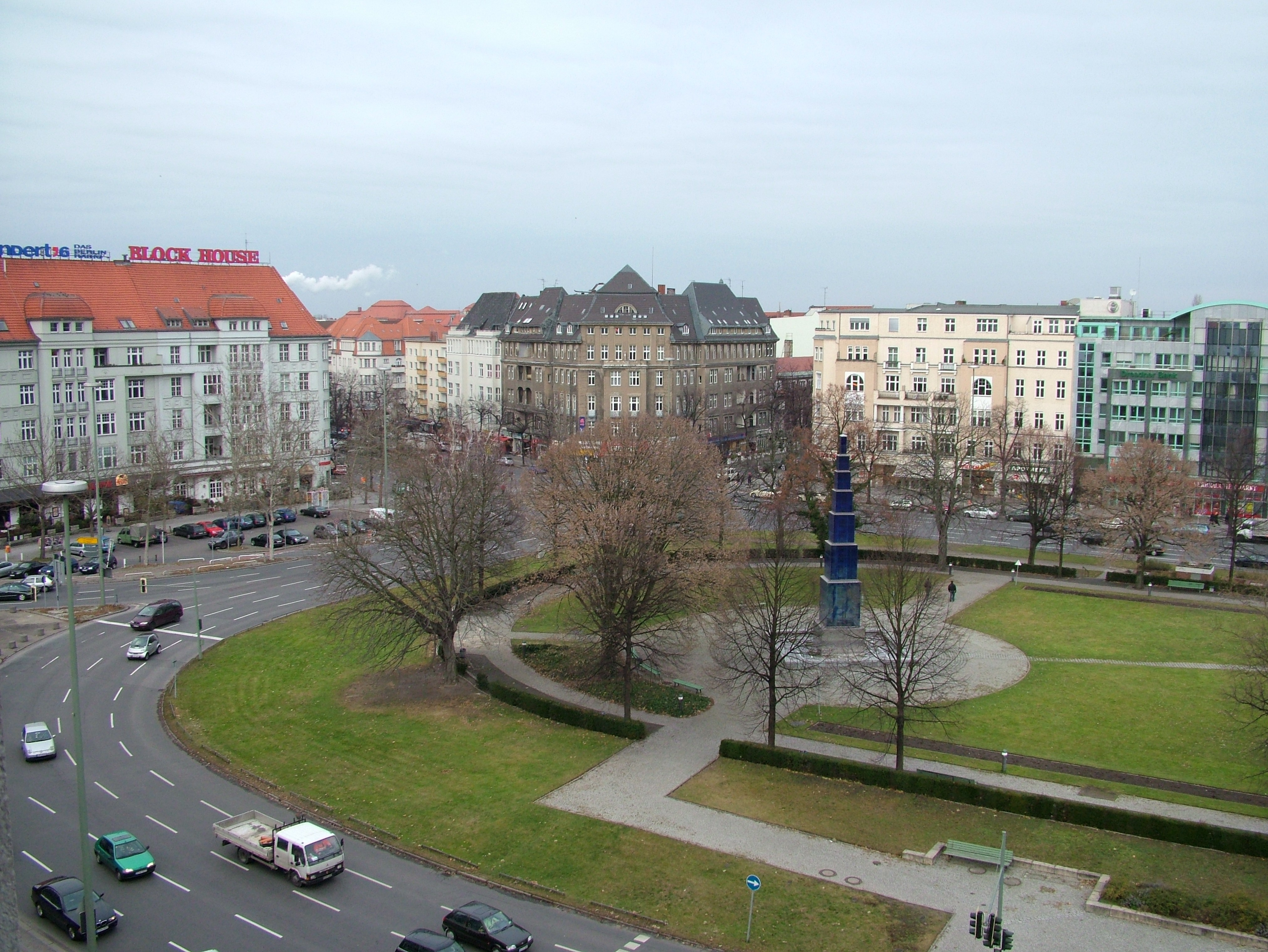
Theodor-Heuss-Platz with Blue Obelisk

Theodor-Heuss-Platz (German pronunciation: [ˈteːodoːɐ̯ ˈhɔʏsˌplats]; colloquially called Theo by locals, pronounced [ˈteːo]) is a large city square in the Westend district of Berlin, Germany. It is named after Theodor Heuss (1884–1963), the first President of Germany after World War II.

== Location ==
The square is located at the western end of the wide Kaiserdamm boulevard, leading via Bismarckstraße, Straße des 17. Juni with the Berlin Victory Column and Brandenburg Gate in a direct line to Pariser Platz, Unter den Linden and the site of the City Palace in Berlin-Mitte. The axis is continued to the west by the Heerstraße up to Scholzplatz and further towards Spandau and the Berlin city limits. Underneath the square is the U-Bahn station Theodor-Heuss-Platz.

== History ==
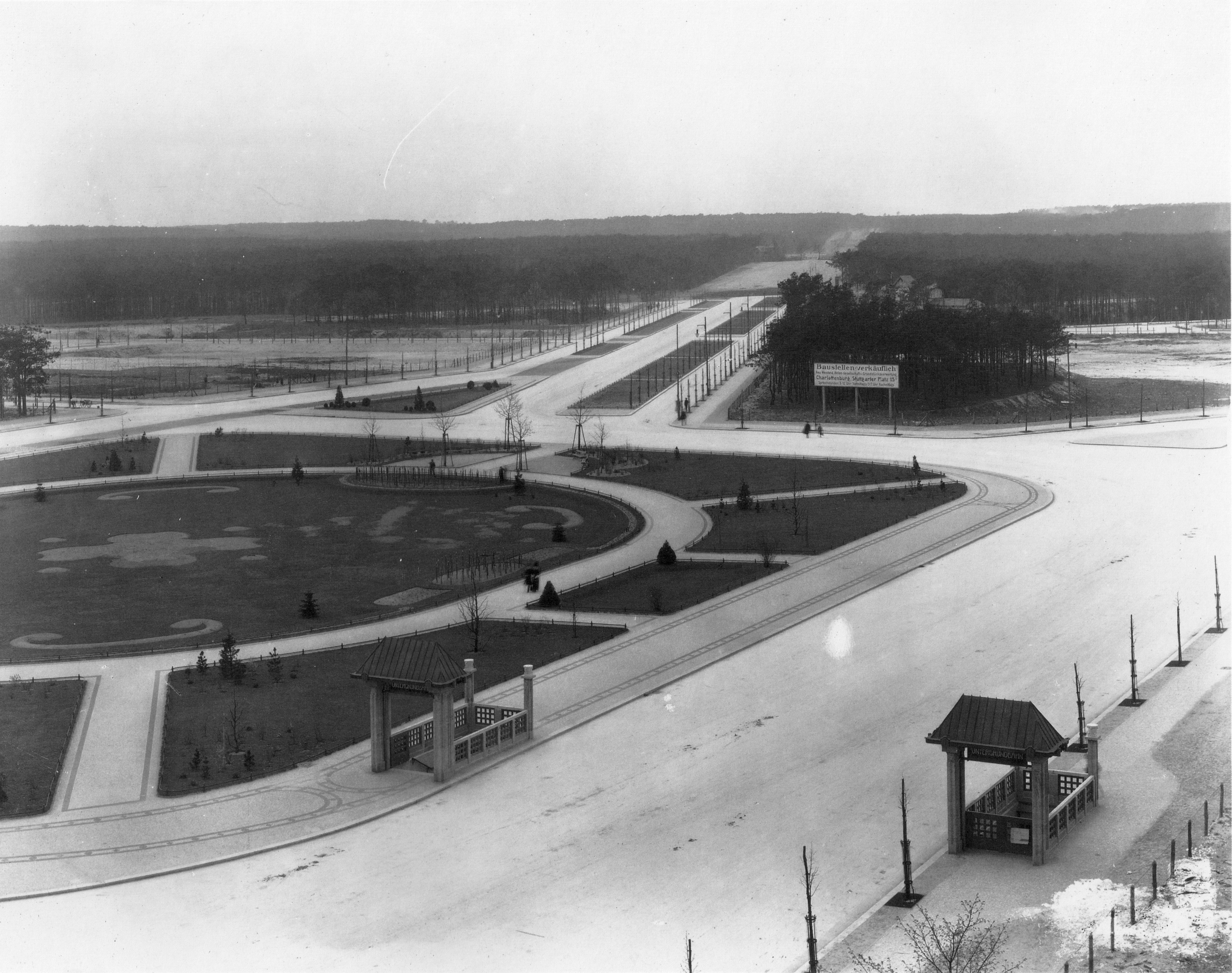
Reichskanzlerplatz with U-Bahn entrances, 1907

The square was laid out as part of the development of the new Westend district between 1904 and 1908 and then named Reichskanzlerplatz after the office of the Imperial Chancellor. When the eponymous U-Bahn station was inaugurated by Emperor Wilhelm II on 29 March 1908, the square was still without any houses.

After the Nazi seizure of power, the square was renamed Adolf-Hitler-Platz on 21 April 1933. According to the Welthauptstadt Germania plans by Hitler and his architect Albert Speer, it was to have an important role at the western end of the monumental east–west axis, including a vast heroes' memorial. It was also planned to rename the square after Benito Mussolini. After World War II, its name officially returned to Reichskanzlerplatz on 31 July 1947. Only six days after the death of President Theodor Heuss on 18 December 1963, the square was given its present name.

In 2014, Google apologized after labeling Theodor-Heuss-Platz as Adolf-Hitler-Platz on its Google Maps service.

== Buildings ==
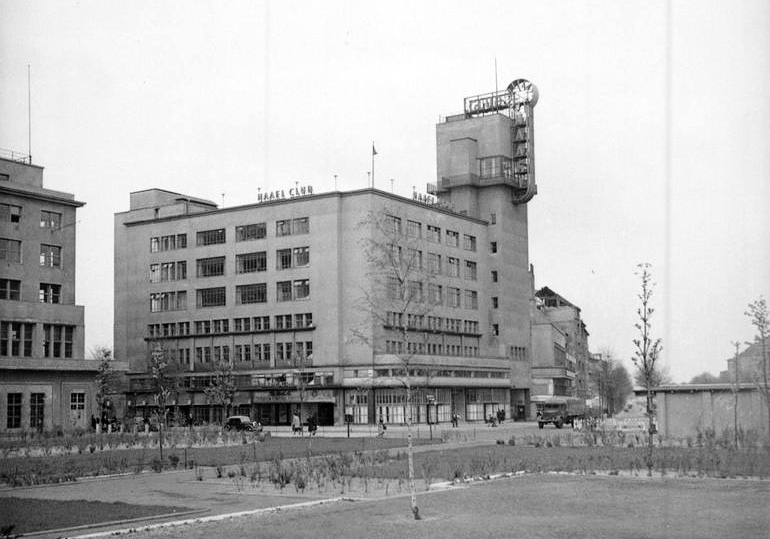
NAAFI Club, Amerikahaus

At the south of the square is the former Edinburgh House, the Deutschlandhaus and the Amerikahaus (clockwise). The Edinburgh House, was erected from 1960 to 1962 as a British Forces guest house and officers' hotel. It is today run as a boarding house by the Berlin Studentenwerk. The adjacent Deutschlandhaus and Amerikahaus were built from 1928 to 1930, including a hotel, a coffee house and a cinema. Since 1937 the studios of TV Station Paul Nipkow were located in the Deutschlandhaus. The Amerikahaus at the corner of Heerstraße was known as the Summit House, Jerboa Cinema and NAAFI centre after the war until the British Forces left Berlin in 1994. Today it is used as the cabaret theatre Die Wühlmäuse.

In 1970, on the eastern edge of the square located 18-story high TV centre of the former Sender Freies Berlin (SFB) broadcaster was finished. After the merger with the ORB on 1 May 2003 it became the Berlin home of the now created Rundfunk Berlin-Brandenburg (RBB). Close by in Masurenallee is the historic Haus des Rundfunks, finished 1930, which was seat of the Reichs-Rundfunk-Gesellschaft and the East German Berliner Rundfunk before the founding of the SFB. It is located straight across the exhibition ground and the Funkturm.

== Memorials and art ==
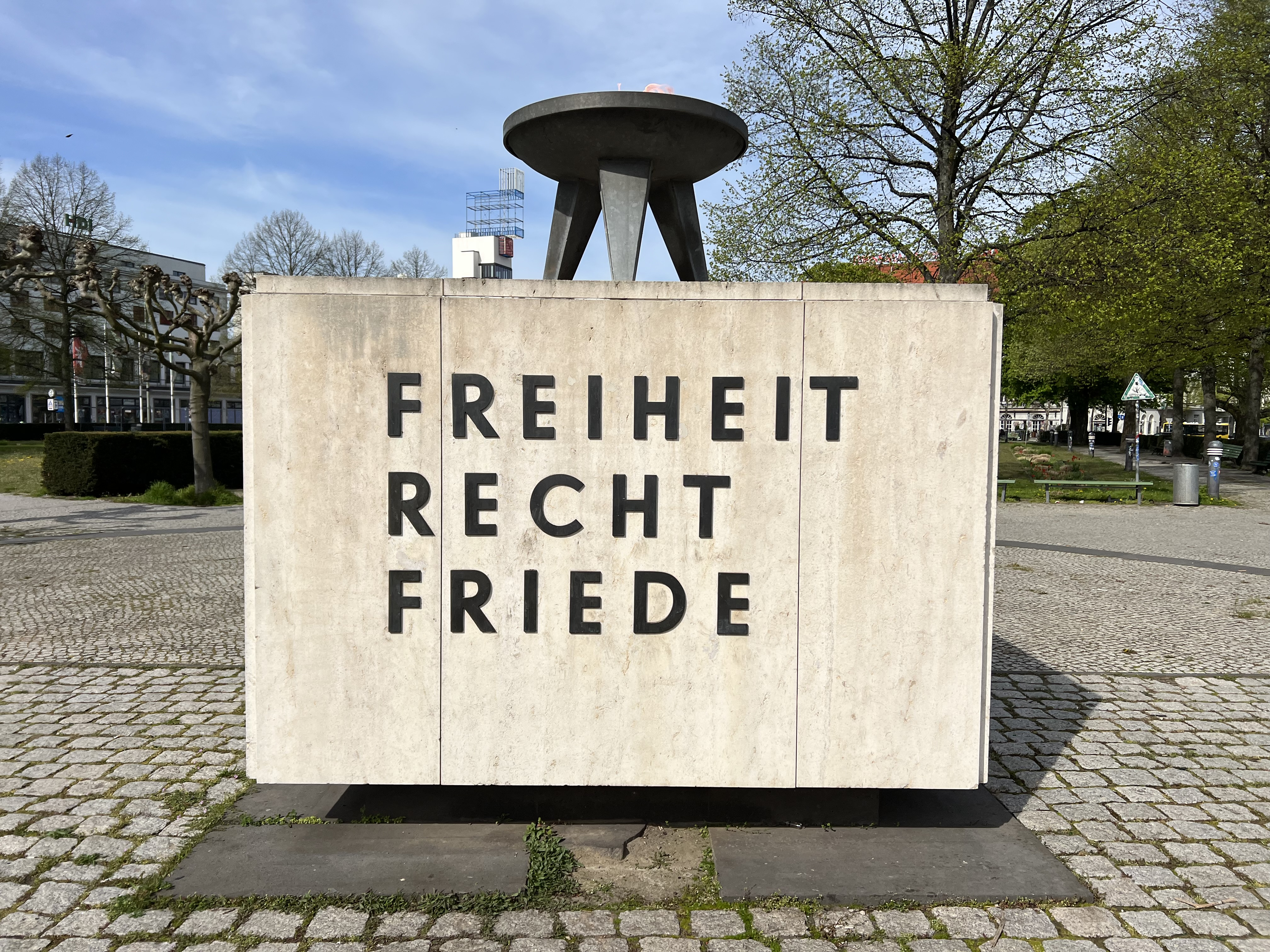
Eternal Flame

In 1955 an eternal flame monument was erected by compatriot groups organised in the Federation of Expellees to commemorate the Flight and expulsion of Germans (1944–50) during and after World War II. The flame was extinguished in the day of German reunification on 3 October 1990, but again lit three months later on Human Rights Day 10 December.

In 1989 the sculpture duo Two Heads was erected at the eastern edge of the square. The Blue Obelisk (Blauer Obelisk) was placed opposite the eternal flame monument in 1995.

== Notable residents ==
- Richard Strauss (1864–1949), composer, lived in Heerstraße 2 at the corner of Reichskanzlerplatz from 1913 to 1917
- Magda Quandt (1901–1945) lived in Reichskanzlerplatz 3 after her divorce in 1929, where she received Hitler and her future husband Joseph Goebbels

== In popular culture ==
The novel In the Presence of Mine Enemies by Harry Turtledove has several crucial scenes set in Adolf Hitler Platz, in an alternate history where the Third Reich rules much of the world at the dawn of the 21st century. The address plays an important role in the novel A Quiet Flame, one of the Bernie Gunther crime novels written by Philip Kerr, where information is retrieved by breaking into the home of Magda Qundt which is located in this street.
