= A German Requiem =

A German Requiem may refer to:

- A German Requiem (Brahms), a large-scale work for chorus, orchestra, and soloists, composed by Johannes Brahms and completed in 1869
- A German Requiem (novel), a 1991 novel set in post-war Germany by Philip Kerr
- German Requiem in G minor, composed by Franz Schubert

== See also ==
- "Deutsches Requiem" (short story), a 1949 short story by noted Argentine author, Jorge Luis Borges
