= Dornum Synagogue =

Museum in Germany

Coordinates: 53°38′52″N 7°25′44″E

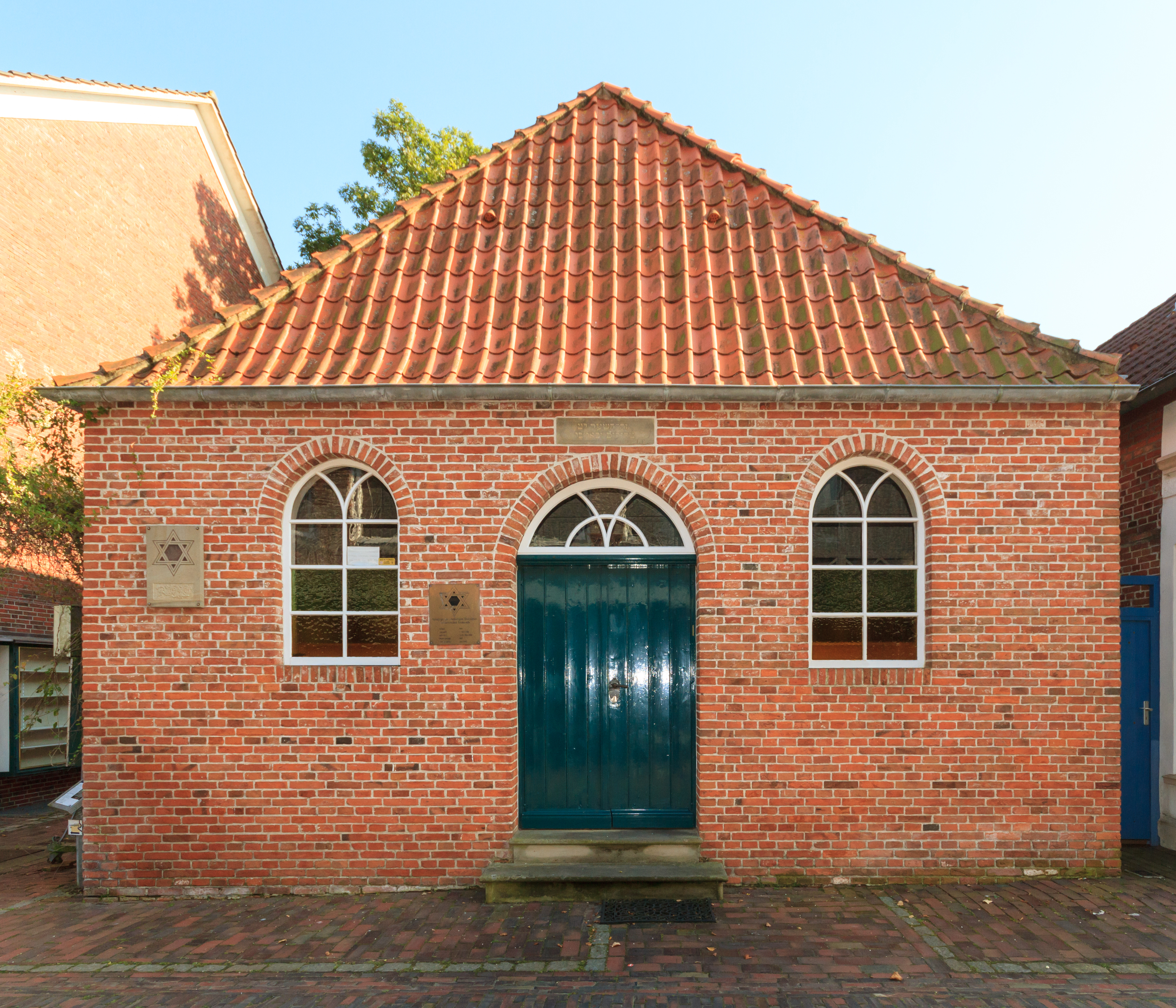
Former Synagogue Dornum (façade reconstructed 1991)

The former synagogue of Dornum is the only synagogue building in East Frisia that has survived largely in its original condition. The Jewish community used it from 1841 until 7 November 1938. The last Jewish residents left Dornum in 1940. Today the building serves as a memorial site and Jewish museum. It is run by the Förderverein Synagoge Dornum (Friends of Dornum Synagogue Association).

== Description ==
The synagogue, located at Kirchstraße 3 in Dornum, is a single-storey brick building with a hipped roof. It is approximately 7.75 m wide and 10.5 m long. The main entrance on Kirchstraße leads into a hallway, from which two roughly square areas for women are reached to the north and south; these are separated by a wooden partition with a closed balustrade and lattice-work above. The prayer hall itself lies in the rear part of the building. It measures approximately 6.80 × 7.30 m and has a wooden barrel-vaulted ceiling. The floor is laid with stoneware tiles.

== History ==
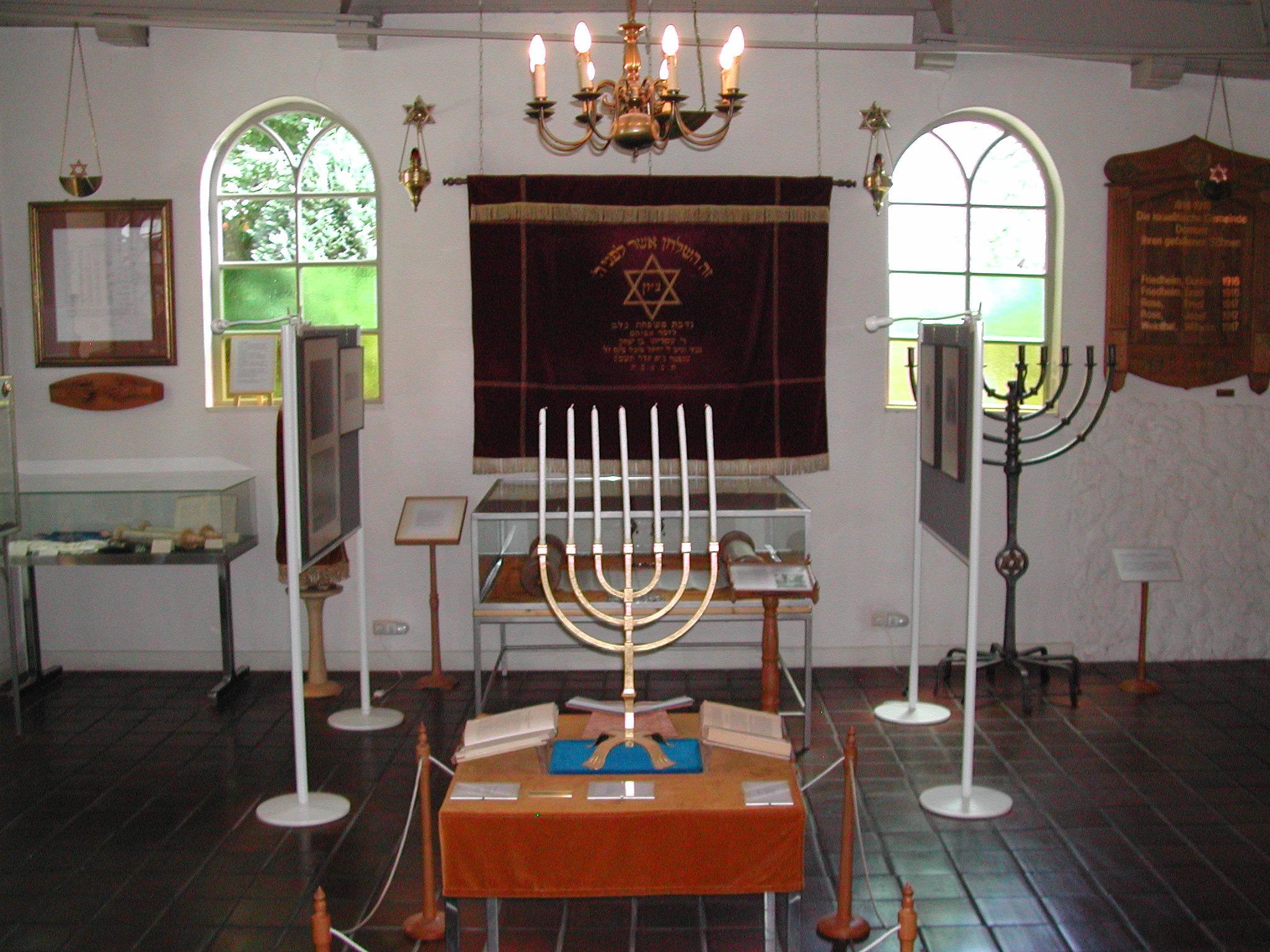
Memorial and information site, Dornum Synagogue

After the number of Jews in the area rose sharply following the Christmas Flood of 1717, the factor Samuel Aarons set up a prayer room in a building on Hohe Straße (today Kirchstraße), first mentioned around 1730. The house containing this prayer room presumably stood on the plot where the synagogue was later built. It may also have had a mikveh; this is suggested by a shaft found in the northern part of the women's area during construction work in 1991, which could be the remains of a Jewish ritual bath. The shaft measured about 2.50 m × 3.50 m and was 2.40 m deep, with side walls painted blue on the inside, though the steps were no longer complete. The shaft was filled in again after the work was finished.

The synagogue still standing in Dornum today was built by the local Jewish community in 1841. The funds for this were borrowed by Dornum's Jews from a Christian moneylender, with houses and valuables of Jewish families pledged as security. Around 1860 the building was renovated, and in 1895/96 pews were installed. In 1904 the mikveh was relocated from the synagogue to the annex of the Jewish elementary school. In 1912 the community decided to sell the synagogue and planned a new building; this could not be carried out due to the outbreak of the First World War. Instead, the old synagogue was modernized once again, receiving electric light in 1920. However, heating was never installed, which was a problem during the winter months, as the floor consisted only of packed clay. In the following years many Jews left the town for economic reasons. After 1922, services were held only on high holidays, due to the reassignment of the cantor.

The Nazi seizure of power intensified this trend; by the end of 1933 a third of Dornum's Jews had already left. In August 1933 Hohe Straße, on which the synagogue and many Jewish homes were located, was renamed Adolf-Hitler-Straße. After 1933 the Dornum synagogue was hardly used any more, as the required quorum of ten male worshippers for a minyan could no longer be reached. Wilhelm Rose, the last head of the community, finally sold the synagogue on 7 November 1938 for 600 Reichsmarks to the local master carpenter August Teßmer, whose house adjoined the synagogue directly. Teßmer subsequently used the building as a furniture warehouse. Rose transferred the proceeds of the sale, which were intended for the Jewish relief association, to the regional rabbinate in Emden. During the November pogroms of 1938, local SA members broke into the building and stole furnishings, which they then burned in the marketplace.

After the Second World War, the former Jewish house of worship served as a furniture warehouse, a fuel store, and commercial premises. In 1954 the district of Norden approved converting the synagogue into a shop and exhibition space. In the course of this, the street-facing west façade was removed in 1957, shifted about half a metre to the east, and fitted with shop windows and two windows on the upper floor. The sandstone block bearing the Hebrew inscription of Psalm 118:20 ("This is the gate of the Lord, into which the righteous shall enter") above the entrance was preserved and put into storage at that time.

In 1990, the "Synagoge Dornum" support association (Förderverein) was founded, with the goals of preserving and restoring the Dornum synagogue, maintaining and caring for the Jewish cemetery, and creating a permanent exhibition on the Jewish history of Dornum. In 1991 the synagogue was restored using funds from the heritage preservation authority and the municipality of Dornum. In the process, the west façade was also rebuilt using reclaimed bricks from an old Gulfhof farmhouse, and the inscribed stone above the entrance was reinstated. Since then, the former synagogue, with its three rooms covering about 75 square metres, has served as an exhibition on Jewish life in Dornum, which also documents the persecution and murder of its Jewish residents.

== Exhibition ==
The permanent exhibition is divided into the sections History, Culture, and Religion. Changing annual exhibitions are also held.
