= Otto Rahn =

German SS officer and writer (1904–1939)

- Born: 18 February 1904; Michelstadt, German Empire
- Died: 13 March 1939 (aged 35); Kufstein, State of Austria, Nazi Germany
- Education: University of Giessen (BA)
- Known for: Crusade Against the Grail; Lucifer's Court in Europe
- Scientific career
- Thesis: To the Research of Master Kyot of Wolfram von Eschenbach
- Military career
- Branch: Allgemeine SS
- Years: 1936–1939
- Rank: Obersturmführer

Otto Wilhelm Rahn (18 February 1904 – 13 March 1939) was a German medievalist, Ariosophist, and SS officer who researched Holy Grail myths.

== Early life and work ==
Rahn was born on 18 February 1904 to Karl and Clara (née Hamburger) in Michelstadt in the Hesse region of the German Empire. From an early age, Rahn's mother introduced him to the stories and legends of the Holy Grail, Parzival, Lohengrin and the Nibelungenlied. While attending the University of Giessen, he was inspired by his professor, Baron von Gall, to study the Albigensian (Catharism) movement and the massacre that occurred at Montségur. In 1924, he gained a degree in philology, specializing in the literary history of the language and romances of France.

In 1931, he travelled to the Pyrenees region of southern France where he conducted research. Aided by the French mystic and historian Antonin Gadal, Rahn argued that there was a direct link between Wolfram von Eschenbach's Parzival and the Cathars. Rahn further believed that the Cathars were associated with the Holy Grail and that the keys to this mystery lay beneath the mountain where the fortress of Montségur stood, the last Cathar fortress to fall during the Albigensian Crusade.

== SS ==
In 1934, Rahn published his first book, Kreuzzug gegen den Gral ("Crusade Against the Grail"), which attempted to link the medieval romance of Parzival with the persecution of the Cathars by Pope Innocent III. The book came to the attention of Karl Maria Wiligut, head of the Department for Pre- and Early History of the SS Race and Settlement Main Office. Wiligut was impressed by the work and passed it to Heinrich Himmler, the head of the SS, who, from an early age, had a marked interested in ancient history, chivalry and the occult, especially ariosophy. Rahn received a telegraph from Himmler in 1933, expressing his interest in Rahn's work. Rahn joined Himmler's staff as a junior, non-commissioned officer and became a full member of the SS in March 1936, attaining the rank of SS-Unterscharführer the following month. In an interview with Rüdiger Sünner for the 1998 documentary Schwarze Sonne, Adolf Frisé, a confidante of Rahn's, said of him: "He was only devoted to one person in the SS, and that was Himmler... to him, Himmler was a saint, and he protected him". On joining the SS, Rahn himself said: "A man has to eat. What was I to do? Turn Himmler down?"

Research for his second book Lucifer's Court led Rahn to sacred sites across Nazi Germany, France, Italy, and Iceland, and during this time he maintained frequent correspondence with Himmler who was interested in Rahn's research and, through the SS, funded his expeditions.

== Decline and death ==
Rahn was assigned guard duty at the Dachau concentration camp in order to "toughen him up".

Deeply concerned by what he had witnessed in Dachau, Rahn confided in a friend; "I have much sorrow for my country... impossible for tolerant, liberal man like me to live in a nation that my native country has become". Rahn offered his resignation from the SS in February 1939, which was accepted by Himmler. On 13 March, Rahn's body was found by local children in a ravine near Söll (Kufstein, Tyrol), in Austria. Sixty years later, in an interview with Sünner, one of those who found Rahn's body described finding "two empty bottles" next to it. Rahn's death was privately ruled a suicide but was presented by Himmler to the SS as having occurred following a "mountaineering accident". Rahn has been the object of many rumours and strange stories, including that his death had been faked, although all such speculation is unsubstantiated.

== Rahn in popular culture ==
- In the Italian comic book Martin Mystère, Rahn fakes his death and joins the United States Secret Service "Elsewhere".
- The Pale Criminal (1990), part II of Philip Kerr's Berlin Noir trilogy, has Rahn as a secondary character.
- Richard Stanley made a documentary about Rahn and his fixation on the Holy Grail titled The Secret Glory in 2001.
- The 2013 Snog album Babes in Consumerland features the song "Otto Rahn".
- The band Civil War, in the album "Killer Angels", features the song "Lucifer's Court" about Rahn.
- Sorcerer's Feud (2014) by Katharine Kerr is another novel that has Rahn as a character.

== Works ==
- Kreuzzug gegen den Gral. Die Geschichte der Albigenser (Broschiert) (in German), 1934, ISBN 3-934291-27-9; ISBN 978-3-934291-27-0.
- Croisade contre le Graal: Grandeur et Chute des Albigeois (Broché) (French translation), 1934, ISBN 2-86714-184-2; ISBN 978-2-86714-184-3.
- Crusade Against the Grail: The Struggle between the Cathars, the Templars, and the Church of Rome (First English Translation by Christopher Jones), 1934–2006, ISBN 1-59477-135-9; ISBN 978-1-59477-135-4.
- Luzifers Hofgesind, eine Reise zu den guten Geistern Europas (in German), 1937, ISBN 3-934291-19-8; ISBN 978-3-934291-19-5.
- Lucifer's Court: A Heretic's Journey in Search of the Light Bringers (English translation), 1937–2008, ISBN 1594771979; ISBN 978-1594771972.

== Sources ==
- Nicholas Goodrick-Clarke. 1985. The Occult Roots of Nazism: Secret Aryan Cults and Their Influence on Nazi Ideology: The Ariosophists of Austria and Germany, 1890-1935; p. 188-189
- Otto Rahn and the Quest for the Holy Grail
- Sabeheddin, M (July–August 1997). "Otto Rahn & the Quest for the Holy Grail (New Dawn No. 43)". New Dawn Magazine. New Dawn International News Service. Archived from the original on 2009-10-27.
- Biography at Jones' Celtic Encyclopedia
