= March Violets =

1989 novel by Philip Kerr

- First edition
- Author: Philip Kerr
- Language: English
- Series: Berlin Noir
- Genre: Crime, Detective, Historical mystery
- Publisher: Viking Press, London
- Publication date: 1989
- Publication place: United Kingdom
- Media type: Print (Hardback & Paperback)
- Pages: 256 pp (Hardback edition)
- ISBN: 978-0-670-82431-1
- OCLC: 20427383
- Dewey Decimal: 823/.914 20
- LC Class: PR6061.E784 M37 1989
- Followed by: The Pale Criminal

March Violets is a historical detective novel and the first written by Philip Kerr featuring detective Bernhard "Bernie" Gunther. March Violets is the first of the trilogy by Kerr called Berlin Noir. The second, The Pale Criminal, appeared in 1990 and the third, A German Requiem in 1991.

== Plot ==
Bernhard Gunther, a 38-year-old Berlin ex-cop turned private investigator, is hired in the summer of 1936 by rich industrialist Hermann Six to recover a diamond necklace stolen from his daughter Grete's house. As part of the robbery, it appears both his daughter and her husband, Paul Pfarr, were murdered and the house was torched.

Through various informants, Gunther discovers that Paul Pfarr was an SS officer and at odds with his father-in-law Six, and was working to eradicate corruption in the government administration under orders from SS and Gestapo leader Heinrich Himmler. He also uncovers a link between Six's private secretary Hjalmar Haupthändler and Kurt Jeschonneck, a shady diamond dealer.

The investigation then centers around a certain Von Greis, an aristocrat collecting blackmail material on important personalities for Hermann Göring, which Göring uses for political means. During the investigation Gunther meets Inge Lorenz, who becomes his assistant and, eventually, romantic interest. With Inge, Gunther follows various clues to try to find Kurt Mutschmann, the criminal who allegedly cracked the safe of the Pfarr house. This leads them to a dilapidated pension where they find Von Greis's decaying body. Eventually they learn that Mutschmann did the robbery for "Red" Dieter, head of the German Strength crime syndicate. Gunther then meets Paul's assistant, Marlene Sahm, at the Reich Sports Field during races that are part of the 1936 Olympic games. From Sahm, Gunther learns that Paul had discovered Six was corrupt and was about to indict him. To do that, he tried to convince Von Greis to release what he had on Six, but Von Greis refused, so Paul got the Gestapo to obtain the documents for him. Von Greis later was killed by Dieter's men.

Following his meeting with Sahm, Gunther takes a taxi to Haupthändler's beach house. There he sees Haupthändler, Jeschonnek, and a woman, and confronts them. In the scuffle he kills Jeschonnek and knocks out Haupthändler and the woman, but is then knocked out himself by an assailant from Dieter's crew. In the meantime, Inge disappears.

Once recovered from the beach house event, Gunther goes to Six's place to get answers to some pending questions. Six tries to pay to get him off the case, but Gunther confronts him with the facts at his disposal. During the exchange Gunther realizes that the woman he saw at Haupthändler's beach house was Six's daughter, not Paul's girlfriend. It turns out Grete Pfarr, Six's daughter, had killed her husband and his mistress and, with the help of Haupthändler, stole the necklace to generate some cash for an escape, then burned down the house. But by then the safe had already been deprived of the papers by Mutschmann, and their theft of the necklace just made Red Dieter look bad to his employer, Hermann Six. Six comes to the terrible realization that Red Dieter holds his daughter and Haupthändler, and he and Gunther retrieve a motor boat to go to the headquarters of the German Strength ring.

At the German Strength headquarters, Six and Gunther explain the case to Red Dieter, who helps them retrieve Haupthändler and Grete, who were being tortured based on the false belief that they must know the location of the von Greis papers since they have the necklace which was in the safe with the papers. In retrieving the two prisoners, Red Dieter has to shoot one of his own surly men and things heat up. Gunther tries to escape from the island with Grete in a boat but they are intercepted by a Gestapo raid. In the action, Grete catches a stray bullet and dies.

Gunther awakens to find out he has been taken in by the Gestapo and he is left to rot in a cell for a week. Eventually, a top Gestapo officer, Reinhard Heydrich, forces him to agree to go to the Dachau concentration camp to try to covertly befriend Mutschmann, who is a prisoner there, and obtain from him the location of the Von Greis papers. Gunther is sent to Dachau and has various unfortunate camp experiences there, which land him at the hospital. In the hospital he discovers Mutschmann, who is dying of hepatitis. In the end Mutschmann yields the location of the papers before dying. It is implied that Gunther gives the papers to the Gestapo, who let him go. He never finds Inge.

== Major themes ==
The major themes of the novel include corruption among the civil servants of the Third Reich, the everyday violence and anti-Semitism of the Nazi regime and the inability or unwillingness of ordinary Germans to act in the face of the coming war.

=== Historical elements ===
Although most of the characters are fictitious, the novel's plot also involves historical figures, including Goering, Himmler, Heydrich, Arthur Nebe, and Walther Funk. A scene in Chapter 15 takes place at the Reich Sports Field during an Olympic track and field event in which Jesse Owens participates.

Many place names of 1936 Berlin are referred to. However, a historical error is present in Chapter 7, where Kerr refers to a street on the edge the Dahlem section of Berlin as "Clayallee". This street, originally Kronprinzenallee, was renamed in 1949 in honor of the American General Lucius D. Clay, Military Governor of the U.S. Occupation Zone and organizer of the Berlin Airlift in relief of the Soviet blockade of West Berlin. In chapter 11, the reference to Reichswerke Hermann Göring is inaccurate since this corporate entity was created only in July 1937.

== Development history ==
=== Publication history ===
- 1989, UK, Viking, ISBN 978-0670824311, Pub date 23 March 1989, Hardcover
- 1990, UK, Penguin, ISBN 978-0140114669, Pub date 14 May 1990, Paperback
- 1993, UK, Penguin, ISBN 978-0140231700, Pub date 29 April 1993 (as the first part of the "Berlin Noir" paperback)

=== Explanation of the novel's title ===
"March violets" were opportunist late-comers to the Nazi Party after the passage of Hitler's Enabling Act rendering him dictator, on March 23, 1933.

== Awards ==
- 1993 Le Prix du Roman d'Aventures
- 1994 Prix Mystère de la critique, in the foreign novel category
- 2011 Named by The Guardian as one of the ten best books set in Berlin
