= The Akhenaten Adventure =

2004 novel by P.B. Kerr

- First edition
- Author: P.B. Kerr
- Cover artist: Petar Meseldžija
- Language: English
- Series: Children of the Lamp
- Genre: Fantasy
- Publisher: Orchard Books/Scholastic
- Publication date: 2004
- Publication place: United Kingdom
- Media type: Print (Hardback)
- Pages: 355
- ISBN: 0-439-67019-5
- OCLC: 55000688
- LC Class: PZ7.K46843 Ak 2004
- Followed by: The Blue Djinn of Babylon

The Akhenaten Adventure is a novel by the Scottish writer P.B. Kerr. It is the first book of the Children of the Lamp series. It tells the story of John and Philippa Gaunt and their adventures when they find that they are djinn, or mystical genies. The book was on the New York Times Best Seller list for children's books and received generally favorable reviews. The novel's sequel is The Blue Djinn of Babylon, the second book in the seven part series.

== Writing ==
Kerr wrote The Akhenaten Adventure after worrying that his oldest son was spending too much time playing video games and not enough time reading. The book was sold as part of a trilogy to Scholastic Publishing for a then record 1 million GBP.

== Plot ==
John and Philippa Gaunt are two young children who live an upper class life in New York City, New York. Their uncle Nimrod appears to them in a dream and tells them about their magical powers as djinn. They are then sent to spend the summer with him, where he teaches them how to use their powers.

Nimrod, John, and Philippa encounter various adventures while trying to discover where the Seventy Lost Djinn of Akhenaten are hidden. After travelling around the world looking for clues, the book concludes with a battle in the British Museum, where the children must free their uncle by taking a trip to the North Pole. They learn many different life lessons on their spectacular trip.

== Movie ==
DreamWorks optioned The Akhenaten Adventure in 2003 before it was published.
