= Blauer Obelisk =

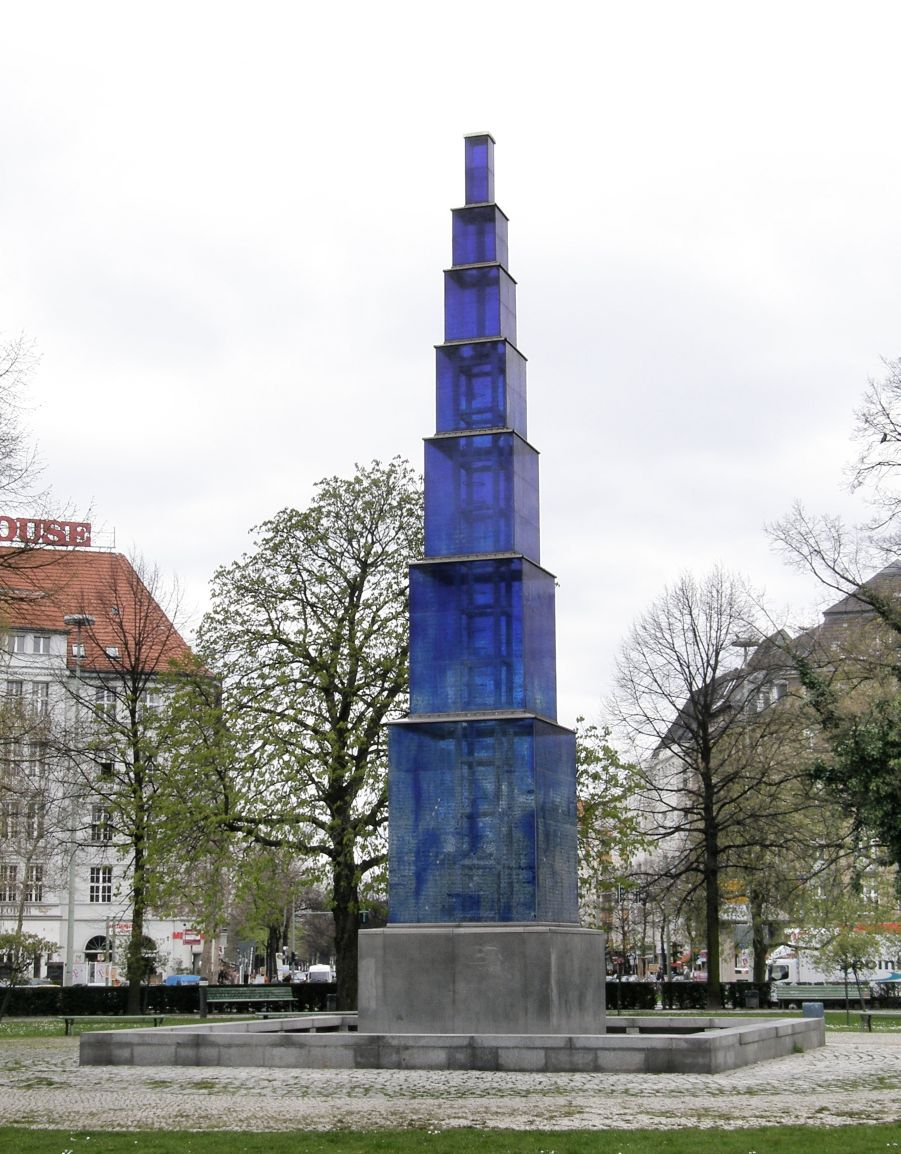
- Artist: Hella Santarossa
- Year: 1995
- Medium: blue glass, stainless steel, granite
- Subject: fountain and installation artwork
- Location: Berlin; 52°30′33.68″N 13°16′19.76″E

The Blauer Obelisk (lit. 'Blue Obelisk') is a public artwork located in Westend, Berlin. It was designed by Hella Santarossa.

== History ==
The 15-meter-high fountain was conceived as a fountain installation. It is made of glass and steel. The stands on the central island of Theodor-Heuss-Platz in Charlottenburg. In September 2024, the obelisk was vandalised. It is now out under restoration.

== See also ==
- List of public art in Berlin
