= Field Grey =

2010 novel

- Author: Philip Kerr
- Language: English
- Series: Bernie Gunther
- Genre: Crime thriller
- Publisher: Quercus Publishing
- Publication date: 2010
- Publication place: United Kingdom
- Media type: Print
- Preceded by: If the Dead Rise Not
- Followed by: Prague Fatale

Field Grey is a 2010 crime thriller novel by the British author Philip Kerr. It is the seventh in his series of novels featuring the Berlin detective Bernie Gunther. The title refers to Feldgrau, the colour of the uniforms of the German Wehrmacht during the Second World War. It provides a retrospective look across Gunther's service in during the war. As with other books in the series it features the fictional Gunther alongside a number of real historical figures and incidents. In the United States it was published as Field Gray.

== Synopsis ==
The story jumps between several time periods. In Havana in 1954, Gunther plans to flee the country rather than being pressed into the service of the secret police of the Cuban dictator Fulgencio Batista. However his escape is thwarted when his vessel is stopped by a US Navy patrol vessel and he is taken to the base at Guantanamo Bay. Realising that they have got hold of Bernie Gunther, suspected as a potential war criminal he flown back to West Germany via New York.

In Germany he is incarcerated by the American authorities at Landsberg Prison near Munich, filled with war criminals. Under interrogation, he relates his experiences in 1941 during Operation Barbarossa around Minsk where he committed a retaliatory massacre of Soviet NKVD agents. It soon becomes clear that the CIA are more interested in his complex history with Erich Mielke dating back to 1931 and the dying days of the Weimar Republic. As an officer of the Berlin police he had rescued the German Communist militant from likely death at the hands of Nazi Party stormtroopers, a few months later Gunther tried to arrest him following the murder of two Berlin policemen but Meilke has fled the country.

The two encountered each other again in 1940 when Gunther went to Vichy France with orders to identify and Meilke. Having been sent there by Reinhard Heydrich of the SS, Gunther is reluctant to have Meilke arrested and summarily executed rather than the judicial trial he believes he deserves for his killing of the police officer and he pretends not to recognise him, sparing his life again. At the end of the Second World War with Gunther now a prisoner in an East German concentration camp following his capture at the Battle of Königsberg, Meilke pretends to return the favour by helping Gunther escape. In fact Meilke plans to have Gunther killed by an assassin on the journey, believing he knows too much about his dirty linen now he is a rising figure in the East German secret police.

Back in 1954 Gunther finds himself in a complex game between the CIA and French Intelligence as they hope to lure Meilke across the border into West Berlin and seize him.

== Bibliography ==
- Lake, Anthony (2024). Nazi Germany and the Holocaust in Historical Crime Fiction: 'What's One More Murder?'. Routledge. ISBN 978-1-032-42302-9.
- Rau, Petra (2013). Our Nazis: Representations of Fascism in Contemporary Literature and Film. Edinburgh University Press. doi:10.3366/j.ctt3fgswj. ISBN 978-0-7486-6864-9.
- Sandberg, Eric (2018-04-12). 100 Greatest Literary Detectives. Bloomsbury Academic. ISBN 978-1-4422-7822-6.
