= A Quiet Flame =

2008 novel

- Author: Philip Kerr
- Language: English
- Series: Bernie Gunther
- Genre: Crime
- Publisher: Quercus Publishing
- Publication date: 2008
- Publication place: United Kingdom
- Media type: Print
- Preceded by: The One from the Other
- Followed by: If the Dead Rise Not

A Quiet Flame is a 2008 crime novel by the British author Philip Kerr. It is the fifth in his series featuring Bernie Gunther and takes place in Peronist Argentina in 1950. It follows directly on from the previous novel The One from the Other in which Gunther had fled West Germany in 1949 following a difficult case, using the ODESSA escape route for wanted Nazis and war criminals.

The plot takes place in the post-war Argentine presidency of Juan Peron, flashbacks to 1932 and the last months of the Weimar Republic before the Nazi takeover, when Gunther was working as part of the homicide squad of the Berlin Police on Alexanderplatz. A number of real figures appear in the story including Ernst Gennat, Bernhard Weiss, Otto Skorzeny and Eva Perón.

== Bibliography ==
- Lake, Anthony (2024). Nazi Germany and the Holocaust in Historical Crime Fiction: 'What's One More Murder?'. Routledge. ISBN 978-1-032-42302-9.
- Rau, Petra (2013). Our Nazis: Representations of Fascism in Contemporary Literature and Film. Edinburgh University Press. doi:10.3366/j.ctt3fgswj. ISBN 978-0-7486-6864-9.
