= List of streets named after Adolf Hitler =

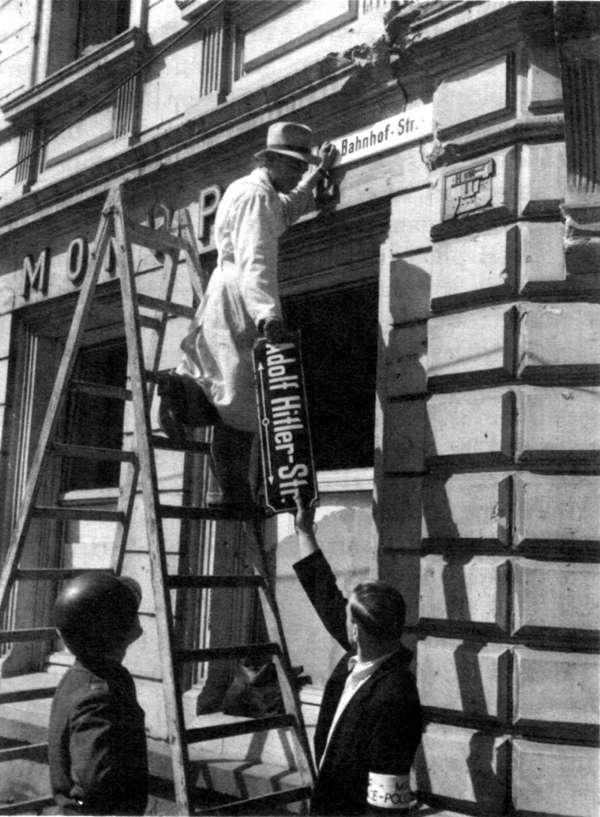
Adolf Hitler street sign being taken down in Trier during denazification

This is a partial list of streets and squares named after Adolf Hitler during the era of Nazi Germany.

The zeal with which German municipal authorities attempted, immediately after the seizure of power, to play their part in the "National Rising" (Nationale Erhebung) is shown by the practice of conferring honorary municipal citizenship on Hitler, and even more by naming a street (Straße), a square or place (Platz), a promenade (Anlage), an avenue (Damm or Allee), a stadium (Kampfbahn), or a bridge (Brücke) after the new chancellor. As early as March and April 1933, a wave of renamings swept through Germany's cities. There was a decree from the Reich Ministry of the Interior requiring that the most important street or central square in every city was to bear Hitler's name. Most of the examples in the list come from this period.

The renaming of streets and squares was part of the personality cult surrounding Hitler and served as propaganda and a demonstration of power. In addition, many streets and squares were systematically renamed in the spirit of the regime during the Nazi era, by systematically removing names that were associated with criticism of the regime or the Weimar Republic.

After 1945, all streets and squares in Germany bearing Hitler's name were renamed as part of denazification.

== Places in Europe ==
City	Modern Country	Name	From	To	Pre-1933/Post-1945 name	Source
Augsburg	Germany	Adolf-Hitler-Platz			Königsplatz	
Andernach	Germany	Adolf-Hitler-Straßen			Aktienstraße	
Amberg	Germany	Adolf-Hitler-Straßen	1933	1945	Untere Nabburger Straße	
Berlin (Charlottenburg)	Germany	Adolf-Hitler-Platz (Note: further renamings were planned for after the "Final Victory")	April 21, 1933	July 31, 1947	Reichskanzlerplatz (1904–1933, 1947–1963); Theodor-Heuss-Platz (1963-)	
Berlin	Germany	Adolf-Hitler-Sport-Platz			At the Ostpreussendamm and Krahmerstrasse, opposite of Schlosspark Lichterfelde. Now a football pitch. Still a stadium next to it.	
Bad Wildungen	Germany	Adolf-Hitler-Straße			Brunnenstraße	
Bratislava (Pressburg)	Slovakia	Hitlerovo námestie	1938	1945	Masarykovo námestie (1918–1938, 1945–1953); Námestie 4. Apríla (1953–1989); Hlavné námestie (1989–present)	
Bremen	Germany	Adolf-Hitler-Brücke	April 1, 1933	July 1, 1939	Große Weserbrücke (1895 bis 1933); Lüderitzbrücke (1939, 1961) torn down	
Bremen	Germany	Adolf-Hitler-Brücke	July 1, 1939	March 30, 1945	Westbrücke; Stephanibrücke	
Bremen (Hemelingen)	Germany	Adolf-Hitler-Platz			Rathausplatz	
Bremen (Lesum)	Germany	Adolf-Hitler-Platz			An der Lesumer Kirche	
Bremen (Aumund)	Germany	Adolf-Hitler-Straße			Hammersbecker Straße	
Bremen (Lesum)	Germany	Adolf-Hitler-Straße			Kellerstraße	
Bromberg (now Bydgoszcz)	Poland	Adolf-Hitler-Straße			Gdańska	
Breslau (now Wrocław)	Poland	Adolf-Hitler-Platz			Plac Mongolski	
Breslau (now Wrocław)	Poland	Adolf-Hitler-Straße			Friedrich-Ebert-Straße; Mickiewicza	
Budapest VI.	Hungary	Hitler Adolf tér	1938	1945	Kodály körönd	
Cilli (now Celje)	Slovenia	Adolf-Hitler-Platz			Prešernova ulica	
Cologne	Germany	Adolf-Hitler-Platz			Platz der Republik/Deutscher Platz; Ebertplatz (after 1950)	
Dortmund	Germany	Adolf-Hitler-Allee			Hainallee	
Düsseldorf	Germany	Adolf-Hitler-Platz			Graf-Adolf-Platz	
Düsseldorf	Germany	Adolf-Hitler-Straße			Haroldstraße	
Engerau (now Bratislava)	Slovakia	Adolf-Hitler-Straße	1938	1945	Masarykova (1918–1938); Benešova (1945–1948); Stalinova (1948–1989); Zadunajská cesta (1989–present)	
Eppingen	Germany	Adolf-Hitler-Straße			Brettener Straße	
Erlangen	Germany	Adolf-Hitler-Straße			Hauptstraße	
Erftstadt	Germany	Adolf-Hitlerstrasse			Niederweg	
Essen	Germany	Adolf-Hitler-Platz			Burgplatz	
Essen	Germany	Adolf-Hitler-Straße			Kettwiger Straße; Viehofer Straße	
Esslingen	Germany	Adolf Hitlerplatz			–; Marktplatz	
Euskirchen	Germany	Adolf-Hitler-Straße			Hochstraße	
Festenberg (now Twardogóra)	Poland	Adolf Hitler Platz			Plac Piastów	
Frankfurt am Main	Germany	Adolf-Hitler-Anlage			Gallus-Anlage	
Freising	Germany	Adolf-Hitler-Straße			Obere Hauptstraße	
Gera	Germany	Adolf-Hitler-Platz				
Gotenhafen (now Gdynia)	Poland	Adolf-Hitler-Straße			Świętojańska	
Graz	Austria	Adolf-Hitler-Platz			Hauptplatz	
Groß Glienicke (since 1945 Berlin-Kladow)	Germany	Adolf-Hitler-Allee			Seekorso	
Hagen	Germany	Adolf-Hitler-Straße		1945	Ebertstraße (1945–1960); function as main street and B7 taken over by nearby Graf-von-Galen-Ring and half of the street being destroyed in 1960; Am Hauptbahnhof (1960–present)	
Hagendingen (now Hagondange)	France	Adolf-Hitler-Straße	1940	1944	rue de la gare	
Hamburg	Germany	Adolf-Hitler-Platz			Rathausmarkt	
Hamburg (Winterhude)	Germany	Adolf-Hitler-Straße			Bebelallee	
Hamburg (Altona)	Germany	Adolf-Hitler-Platz			Platz der Republik	
Hamburg (Wandsbek)	Germany	Adolf-Hitler-Damm			Friedrich-Ebert-Damm	
Hamburg (Wilhelmsburg)	Germany	Adolf-Hitler-Straße			Wilhelmsburger Reichsstraße	
Hanover	Germany	Adolf-Hitler-Platz		September 15, 1933	Hermann-Göring-Platz (1933–1945); Corvinusplatz (1945 - )	
Hanover	Germany	Adolf-Hitler-Platz			Theaterplatz	
Hanover	Germany	Adolf-Hitler-Straße			Bahnhofstraße	
Hattingen	Germany	Adolf-Hitler-Platz	March 28, 1933	May 1, 1945	Rathausplatz	
Idar-Oberstein	Germany	Adolf-Hitler-Straße			Hauptstraße	
Hauptstraße Iglau (now Jihlava)	Czech Republic	Adolf-Hitler-Platz			Masarykovo náměstí	
Jägerndorf (now Krnov)	Czech Republic	Adolf-Hitler-Platz			Hlavní náměstí (Main Square)	
Karlsruhe (Neureut)	Germany	Adolf-Hitler-Straße			Welschneureuter Straße	
Karlsruhe (Durlach)	Germany	Adolf-Hitler-Straße			Pfinztalstraße	
Karlsruhe (Hagsfeld)	Germany	Adolf-Hitler-Straße			Schwetzinger Straße	
Karlsruhe (Knielingen)	Germany	Adolf-Hitler-Straße			Neufeldstraße	
Karlsruhe (Grötzingen)	Germany	Adolf-Hitler-Straße			Eugen-Kleiber-Straße	
Kiel	Germany	Adolf-Hitler-Platz			Neumarkt/Rathausplatz	
Königsberg (now Kaliningrad)	Russia	Adolf-Hitler-Platz			Hansaplatz; Ploshchad Pobedy (Victory Square) (now)	
Kassa (now Košice)	Slovakia	Hitlerova ulica			Národná trieda	
Kolozsvár (now Cluj-Napoca)	Romania	Hitler Adolf-tér	1941	1945	Avram Iancu Square, Cluj-Napoca	
Krainburg (now Kranj)	Slovenia	Adolf-Hitler-Platz	1941	1945	Glavni trg (Note: Main Square)	
Krakau (now Kraków)	Poland	Adolf-Hitler-Platz	1939	1944	Rynek Główny (Note: Main Square)	
Leipzig	Germany	Adolf-Hitler-Straße	1933	1945	Karl-Liebknecht-Straße	
Leslau (now Włocławek)	Poland	Adolf-Hitler-Platz			Plac Wolności (Note: Freedom Square)	
Linz	Austria	Adolf-Hitler-Platz	1938	1945	Hauptplatz	
Lippstadt	Germany	Adolf-Hitler-Straße			Lange Straße	
Litzmannstadt (now Łódź)	Poland	Adolf-Hitler-Straße	1939	1944	Piotrkowska Street	
Loon op Zand	Netherlands	Adolf-Hitler-Straße	1942	1944	Hooispoor (partial) The stretch east of the Horst which was part of the M.A.St (Munitions Ausgabe Stelle)	
Luxemburg (now Luxembourg City)	Luxembourg	Adolf-Hitlerstraße			Avenue de la Liberté	
Lemberg (now Lviv)	Ukraine	Adolf-Hitler Platz	1941	1944	Prospekt Svobody	
Memel (now Klaipėda)	Lithuania	Adolf-Hitler-Straße	1939	1945	Präsident Smetona Allee (Note: Prezidento Smetonos alėja) (before 1939); Liepų gatvė(post 1945)	
Mülhausen (now Mulhouse)	France	Adolf-Hitler-Straße			rue du Sauvage (Note: ger: Wildemannstraße)	
Mülhausen (now Mulhouse)	France	Adolf-Hitler-Platz			place de la Réunion	
Munich (Pasing)	Germany	Adolf-Hitler-Platz			Avenariusplatz	
Munich (Solln)	Germany	Adolf-Hitler-Allee			Diefenbachstraße	
Munich (Obermenzing)	Germany	Adolf-Hitler-Straße			Verdistraße	
Munich(Untermenzing)	Germany	Adolf-Hitler-Straße			Eversbuschstraße	
Munich (Allach)	Germany	Adolf-Hitler-Straße			Vesaliusstraße	
Munich (Aubing)	Germany	Adolf-Hitler-Straße			Limesstraße	
Munich (Lochhausen)	Germany	Adolf-Hitler-Straße			Schussenrieder Straße	
Nitra (Neutra)	Slovakia	Hitlerova ulica			Leninova trieda; Hitlerova ulica; Wilsonova ulica; Masarykova ulica; Erzsébet út; Tóth Vilmos utcza; Hosszú utcza; Štefánikova trieda (current)	
Neuburg an der Donau	Germany	Adolf-Hitler-Straße		1945	Luitpoldstraße/Luitpoldstraße (1945–2014); Adolf-Hitler-Straße (2014–2016, inadvertently restored); Luitpoldstraße (since 2016)	
Neumünster	Germany	Adolf-Hitler-Platz			Großflecken	
Neumünster	Germany	Adolf-Hitler-Straße			Kuhberg	
Nuremberg	Germany	Adolf-Hitler-Platz			Hauptmarkt	
Osnabrück	Germany	Adolf-Hitler-Platz			Neumarkt	
Osnabrück	Germany	Adolf-Hitler-Straße			Bramstraße	
Potsdam	Germany	Adolf-Hitler-Allee			Allee nach Glienicke	
Potsdam	Germany	Adolf-Hitler-Platz			Green space between Althoffstraße and Yorckstraße (today Kopernikusstraße)	
Považská Bystrica (Waagbistritz)	Slovakia	Adolf-Hitler-Straße	1939	1945	Továrenská (-1939); Stalinova (1945–1989); Robotnícka (from 1990)	
Reichenberg (now Liberec)	Czech Republic	Adolf-Hitler-Platz	1938	1945	Altstädter Platz (-1938); Náměstí bojovníků za mír (1945–1989); nám. Dr. E. Beneše (from 1990)	
Riga	Latvia	Adolf-Hitler-Allee	1942	1944	Brīvības bulvāris	
Riga	Latvia	Adolf-Hitler-Straße	1942	1944	Brīvības iela	
Rome	Italy	Piazzale Adolf Hitler			Piazzale dei Partigiani	
Rome	Italy	Viale Adolf Hitler			Viale delle Cave Ardeatine	
Saarbrücken	Germany	Adolf-Hitler-Straße	1935	1945	Bahnhofstraße	
Schönwalde-Glien	Germany	Adolf-Hitler-Straße			Straße des Westens; Straße der Jugend (today)	
Sofia	Bulgaria	Adolf Hitler blvd.			Булевард Евлоги и Христо Георгиеви (Evlogi and Hristo Georgievi Boulevard)	
Sulz unterm Wald (now Soultz-sous-Forêts)	France	Adolf-Hitler-Platz			rue des Barons-de-Fleckenstein	
Straßburg (now Strasbourg)	France	Adolf-Hitler-Platz			place Broglie	
Stuttgart	Germany	Adolf-Hitler-Straße			Planie	
Stuttgart (Birkach)	Germany	Adolf-Hitler-Platz			Bei der Linde	
Stuttgart (Stammheim)	Germany	Adolf-Hitler-Platz			–	
Stuttgart (Feuerbach)	Germany	Adolf-Hitler-Straße			Stuttgarter Straße	
Stuttgart (Plieningen)	Germany	Adolf-Hitler-Straße			Paracelsusstraße	
Stuttgart (Möhringen)	Germany	Adolf-Hitler-Straße			Laustraße	
Stuttgart (Vaihingen)	Germany	Adolf-Hitler-Straße			Böblinger Straße; Hauptstraße	
Stuttgart (Bad Cannstatt)	Germany	Adolf-Hitler-Kampfbahn			Neckarstadion	
Tallinn (Reval)	Estonia	Adolf-Hitler-Straße	1942	1944	Narva maantee	
Tarnowitz (now Tarnowskie Góry)	Poland	Adolf-Hitler-Straße	1939	1944	ul. Parkowa; ul. Stanisława Wyspiańskiego	
Dorpat (now Tartu)	Estonia	Adolf-Hitler-Platz	1942	1944	Raekoja plats	
Thorn (now Toruń)	Poland	Adolf-Hitler-Straße	1940		Aleja Świętego Jana Pawła II	
Treuburg (now Olecko)	Poland	Adolf-Hitler-Platz			Freedom square (Note: plac Wolności)	
Trier	Germany	Adolf-Hitler-Straße (Note: see picture above)			Nordallee (Western part) and Bahnhofstraße; now Theodor-Heuss-Allee and Bahnhofstraße	
Trnava (Tyrnau)	Slovakia	Hitlerova ulica	1939	1945	Masarykova ulica (1918–1938, 1945–1948); Ulica Februárového víťazstva (1953–1990); Hlavná ulica (1990–present)	
Újvidék, Hungary (now Novi Sad)	Serbia (Vojvodina)	Hitler Adolf utca (Note: Улица Адолфа Хитлера)	1941	1944	Улица краља Александра (Note: King Alexander street) (1918–1941); Стаљинова улица (Note: Stalin's street) (1944–1948); Улица Александра Ранковића (Note: Aleksandar Ranković street) (1948–1966); Улица народних хероја (Note: National heroes street) (1966–1992); Улица краља Александра (Note: King Alexander street) (1992–present)	
Valkenburg aan de Geul	Netherlands	Adolf Hitler-Allee	1942	1944	Kloosterweg	
Varnsdorf	Czech Republic	Adolf-Hitler-Straße	1939	1945	ulice Generalisima Stalina; Leninova ulice; Národní ulice	
Warschau (now Warsaw)	Poland	Adolf-Hitler-Platz	1939	1944	Piłsudski Square, formerly Plac Saski (Saxon Square, named after the Saxon Palace) 1818–1928, 1939–40, 1945–46	
Weimar	Germany	Adolf-Hitler-Straße			Karl-Liebknecht-Straße	
Vienna	Austria	Adolf-Hitler-Platz	1938	April 30, 1945	Rathausplatz	
Wilhelmshaven	Germany	Adolf-Hitler-Straße			Paul-Hug-Straße	
Zittau	Germany	Adolf-Hitler-Straße				

== Places in the Americas ==
City	Modern Country	Name	From	To	Later name	Source
Yaphank, New York	United States	Adolf Hitler Street	1930s	1941	Park Boulevard	
Santo Amaro, São Paulo	Brazil	Rua Adolpho Hitler		1931	Rua Almirante Barroso (1931-1935); Rua Gil Eanes (1935-)	

The planned community German Gardens in Yaphank, New York, was built on the former site of Camp Siegfried, which was owned and operated by the pro-Nazi German-American Bund. Until 1941, several local streets were named after prominent Nazis, such as Adolf Hitler Street (renamed Park Boulevard), Goering Street (renamed Oak Street), and Goebbels Street (renamed Northside Avenue).

Before 1931, there are records of a street named Rua Adolpho Hitler in the Campo Belo district of Santo Amaro, São Paulo, Brazil – notably at a time when the Nazis had not yet come to power in Germany. Its name was changed in 1931 to Rua Almirante Barroso, but when Santo Amaro was merged into the city of São Paulo four years after, the street was again renamed Rua Gil Eanes, due to a homonymous street in Brás. The street still retains Gil Eanes's name today.

== See also ==
- Adolf-Hitler-Platz (disambiguation)
