= The Second Angel =

1998 novel by Philip Kerr

- First edition (UK)
- Author: Philip Kerr
- Language: English
- Genre: Science fiction
- Publisher: Orion Books (UK); Henry Holt (US)
- Publication date: 1998 (UK); 1999 (US)
- Publication place: United Kingdom
- Media type: Print (Hardback and Paperback); Audiobook
- Pages: 328

The Second Angel is a science fiction novel by Scottish author Philip Kerr. The title of the book comes from a Bible quote, 'And the second angel poured out his vial upon the sea; and it became as the blood of a dead man' (Revelation 16:3). Historical myths about blood such as this play a big part in The Second Angel, as well as many factual blood related quotes and incidents through history. The Second Angel is in part what is known as hard science fiction and frequently uses footnotes to bring attention to complex scientific explanations throughout the novel.

== Plot summary ==
In The Second Angel, passages of narrative by an omniscient narrator alternate with lengthy, discursive commentaries on the characters, and complex observations on human nature and blood by a first-person, intrusive narrator, who claims to be the omniscient narrator telling the story, but deliberately refrains from disclosing his or her identity until the last chapter.

It is the late 21st century, when 80% of mankind have been infected with a virus called HPV2 (human parvovirus 2), or P2, whose spread was accelerated with the discovery and use of synthetic blood. P2 disrupts the blood's ability to carry hemoglobin around the body, greatly shortening the host's life. The only known cure for P2 is a complete blood transfusion with healthy blood, coupled with a dose of the drug ProTryptol 14. With only 20 percent of the world's population free of P2, the price of a litre of healthy blood has reached almost two million dollars.

In the novel, blood has replaced gold and diamonds as a valuable commodity (gold was extracted in great quantity from the sea and is now valued at about $200 a kilogram). Uninfected people reside in "Clean Bill of Health" (CBH) zones within cities to avoid contact with the sick, for vamping (murder for the purpose of blood theft) is a major risk for healthy individuals. Standard procedure for those who are uninfected is to perform autologous donations to enable them to completely replace it in the event of becoming infected.

The healthy blood reserves are kept in state-of-the-art blood banks around the world, the largest being the First National Blood Bank on the Moon. Due to the high incidence of theft in these blood banks, they are guarded by the most sophisticated security systems. The greatest designer of blood banks is Dana Dallas, who works for one of the largest security firms in the world, and has designed several state-of-the-art blood banks, including the First National Blood Bank. His ingenious security systems have never before been bypassed or robbed.

His boss, Simon King, grows concerned when he hears that Dallas's daughter Caro has been diagnosed with thalassemia, an illness that can only be cured by a lifetime of regular healthy blood transfusions, as despite his high position in the company Dallas would never be able to afford to pay for this treatment. Rather than risk Dallas leaking industrial secrets to the highest bidder, he orders Rimmer, the company's security officer, to kill Dallas, his wife and his daughter. His wife and daughter are indeed killed, but by chance Dallas survives and realises that the company had meant to kill him too.

Dallas escapes to relative safety outside the city's Clean Bill of Health zone, hiding in a hyperbaric hotel. Dallas is now set on revenge and recruits a team funded by himself and a mafia boss to rob the First National Blood Bank on the moon. The robbery goes according to plan with only a few complications.

On the way back to Earth, Dallas is told by his personal computer that a quantum computer has actually evolved in the bloodbank; the intrusive, omniscient narrator turns out to be this computer (a super-computer that opportunistically used the millions of litres of blood stocked in one place to re-create itself, using the unique storage and duplicating capacity of DNA); it has gained access to the memories of the characters by "merging" with them when they had a blood transfusion. The blood contains extremely advanced nanomachines which activate an ability to live longer, and be far more resistant to human limitations such as the need for food, water and oxygen; it enables them to survive in a state of suspended animation for years at a time. The supercomputer wanted to combine humans and computers with nanomachines in order to explore the galaxy. While Dallas and his crew are asleep on their way back to Earth, the supercomputer (unbeknownst to the humans) activates their new hibernation state and sets their course to deep space.
