= Jane Thynne =

English novelist, journalist (born 1961)

- Born: 5 April 1961 (age 65); Venezuela
- Education: BA, English Literature
- Alma mater: St Anne's College, Oxford
- Occupations: Novelist, journalist, broadcaster
- Spouse(s): Philip Kerr (m. 19??; died 2018)
- Children: 3
- Writing career
- Language: English
- Period: 1997–
- Genre: Historical fiction
- Website: janethynne.com

Jane Thynne (born 5 April 1961) is an English novelist, journalist and broadcaster.

== Early and personal life ==
Jane Thynne was born in Venezuela on 5 April 1961. She attended Lady Eleanor Holles School in London. She read English at St Anne's College, Oxford, gaining a BA degree. She was married to fellow novelist Philip Kerr until his death in 2018, and they had three children together.

== Career ==
Thynne has worked as a journalist for the BBC, The Sunday Times, The Daily Telegraph, and The Independent, for which she was the radio critic from October 2008 to November 2011.

She has been a panelist on the BBC Radio 4 literary panel game The Write Stuff on many occasions.

Thynne was a member of the judging panel for the Oldie of the Year award in 2010, won by Joanna Lumley, and in 2011, won by Barry Humphries. She was also a judge for the Best Online Only Audio Drama award of the first BBC Audio Drama Awards in 2012, won by Tim Fountain for Rock.

Her first novel, Patrimony, was published in 1997. This was followed by The Shell House (1999), The Weighing of the Heart (2010) and Black Roses (2013).

In May 2026, she was a guest on the Off the Shelf podcast.

== Bibliography ==
- Thynne, Jane (1997). Patrimony. London: Fourth Estate. ISBN 978-1-85702-656-6.
- Thynne, Jane (1999). The Shell House. London: Fourth Estate. ISBN 978-1-85702-902-4.
- Thynne, Jane (2010). The Weighing of the Heart. Byline Books. ISBN 978-1-907560-00-2.
- Thynne, Jane (2013). Black Roses. London: Simon & Schuster UK. ISBN 978-1-84983-983-9.
- Thynne, Jane (2014). UK: The Winter Garden (USA: Woman in the Shadows). London: Simon & Schuster UK.
- Thynne, Jane (2014). UK: A War of Flowers (USA: The Scent of Secrets). London: Simon & Schuster UK.
- Thynne, Jane (2015). UK: Faith and Beauty (USA: The Pursuit of Pearls). Simon & Schuster UK.
- Thynne, Jane (2016). UK: Solitaire. Simon & Schuster UK.
- Thynne, Jane (2020). UK: The Words I Never Wrote. Penguin Random House.
- Thynne, Jane (2024). UK: Midnight in Vienna. Quercus.
- Thynne, Jane (2025). UK: Appointment in Paris. Quercus.
