= A Man Without Breath =

2010 novel

- Author: Philip Kerr
- Language: English
- Series: Bernie Gunther
- Genre: Crime thriller
- Publisher: Quercus Publishing
- Publication date: 2013
- Publication place: United Kingdom
- Media type: Print
- Preceded by: Prague Fatale
- Followed by: The Lady from Zagreb

A Man Without Breath is a 2013 crime thriller novel by the British author Philip Kerr. It is the ninth in his series featuring Bernie Gunther, a Berlin police detective. It is set during the Second World War when Gunther has been enlisted into the SD. The plot focuses on Gunther's involvement in the uncovering the Katyn massacre of 1940 by the Soviet Union.

== Synopsis ==
In February 1943 Germany is reeling from the defeat at the Battle of Stalingrad. Gunther narrowly escapes death during a bombing raid on Berlin by the Royal Air Force. He is now employed by the Wehrmacht War Crimes Bureau, investigating war crimes committed by Allied Forces against Germany. He is sent to Smolensk, occupied by Germany as part of Operation Barbarossa, where reports of unexplained corpses have been found in Katyn Forest. Although the ground is frozen and therefore cannot be dug, he quickly deduces that there has been a massacre of officers of the Polish Army by the Soviet NKVD in 1940. Returning to Berlin Gunther is ordered by the Reich Minister of Propaganda Joseph Goebbels to head back to Smolensk and spearhead operations to excavate the burials as soon as the ground has thawed enough to allow it. Goebbels anticipates a major propaganda coup that can drive a wedge between the Allies. In the meantime, Gunther encounters both an aristocratic Prussian Junker plot to assassinate Hitler, and a series of unexplained murders of German soldiers in Smolensk.

== Bibliography ==
- Lake, Anthony (2024). Nazi Germany and the Holocaust in Historical Crime Fiction: 'What's One More Murder?'. Routledge. ISBN 978-1-032-42302-9.
- Dall'Asta, Monica; Migozzi, Jacques; Pagello, Federico; Pepper, Andrew (2023-04-21). Contemporary European Crime Fiction: Representing History and Politics. Springer International Publishing. ISBN 978-3-031-21978-8.
- Rau, Petra (2013). Our Nazis: Representations of Fascism in Contemporary Literature and Film. Edinburgh University Press. doi:10.3366/j.ctt3fgswj. ISBN 978-0-7486-6864-9.
