= Children of the Lamp =

Series of novels by P. B. Kerr, 2004–2011

- Author: P. B. Kerr
- Country: UK
- Language: English
- Genre: Fantasy
- Published: 2004-2011
- No. of books: 7

Children of the Lamp is a series of contemporary children's fantasy novels written by British author P. B. Kerr. It tells the story of twins John and Philippa as they discover how to act in the world of djinn.

== Volumes ==
Volume list
No.	Title	Release year
1	The Akhenaten Adventure	2004
2	The Blue Djinn of Babylon	2006
3	The Cobra King of Kathmandu	2006
4	The Day of the Djinn Warriors	2007
5	The Eye of the Forest	2009
6	The Five Fakirs of Faizabad	2010
7	The Grave Robbers of Genghis Khan	2011

== Reception ==
Writing about the first book, a critic Matt Berman stated, "Like many other adult novelists trying to make the transition, [Kerr] will need to learn that different rules apply – the pacing is different, and kids prefer warm passion to cool detachment. There's a lot of potential here for future books in the series, but to be really successful, he will need to bring John and Philippa to life."

== The series ==
=== The Akhenaten Adventure ===
John and Philippa Gaunt are twelve-year-old twins with a remarkably gifted mother, a very kind father, and two dogs that are not who they seem to be. The family lives a life of luxury in New York. One day, their wisdom teeth all appear at once. During an operation to get the wisdom teeth removed, they have the same dream in which their uncle, Nimrod, asks that they come to London. He tells them that they are djinn. They begin the adventure of a lifetime, going from Cairo to London, using pink Ferraris, and riding camels. From New York to Egypt to London, the twins' adventures are filled with excitement as they undergo training in the use of their newly discovered powers but are also fraught with danger as they battle the evil Ifrit tribe of djinn and its leader, Iblis. They must preserve the balance of good and bad luck in the world and free seventy ancient djinn.

=== The Blue Djinn of Babylon ===
John and Philippa Gaunt, twelve-year-old twins who recently discovered themselves to be descended from a long line of djinn and who are now in possession of great powers, have only just returned from their adventures battling evil djinn in Cairo and London. Now the mystery surrounding a powerful book of djinn magic named Solomon's Grimoire lures the twins straight into their next extraordinary adventure.

When the Solomon Grimoire is reported missing, John and Philippa are called upon to retrieve this book of power. They travel across the globe, from New York City to Istanbul, Berlin to Budapest, but little do they know, a trap has been set and the djinn twins are about to walk right into it. Soon, John must embark on an epic journey to save his sister from the fate of eternal hard-heartedness before it is too late.

Kirkus Reviews describe the book as, "Solidly entertaining despite jokes that try a little too hard."

=== The Cobra King of Kathmandu ===
Fiery magic in a land of ice, midnight intruders, and murder by snakebite sweep John and Philippa Gaunt into their third fantastic adventure. After their friend Dybbuk Sachertorte sends an email pleading for help, the twins go save him. Dybbuk gives a mysterious painting leading them to Nepal. In snowy Kathmandu, the children face the ultimate test of their djinn powers.

=== The Day of the Djinn Warriors ===
The Day of the Djinn Warriors is the fourth novel and deals with a race against time for John and Philippa Gaunt to outwit the wicked Iblis. John and Philippa attempt to rescue their mother from her fate as the Blue Djinn of Babylon and discover that an aging curse has been placed on their father and if the twins are gone too long, he will rapidly become an old man. As the twins and their friends travel around the globe on their rescue mission, they notice an evil force has awakened the terracotta warriors created by an ancient Chinese emperor, and someone with very bad intentions has cast a spell possessing the soldiers with wicked spirits.

=== The Eye of the Forest ===
John and Philippa Gaunt find themselves tangled up in a spellbinding mystery that takes them deep into the heart of the Amazon jungle. When a collection of Incan artifacts goes missing, the Blue Djinn of Babylon dispatches the twins and Uncle Nimrod to recover them.

=== The Five Fakirs of Faizabad ===
John and Phillipa Gaunt are in search of an ancient fakir, who is a holder of one of the world's greatest secrets given by Tirthankara. A fakir comes out only when the world is full of misfortune.

=== The Grave Robbers of Genghis Khan ===
Djinn twins John and Philippa are off on another enchanting, and dangerous, adventure in the last book in the series. As volcanoes begin erupting all over the world, spilling golden lava, the twins must go on a hunt for the wicked djinn who wants to rob the grave of the great Genghis Khan.

== Use of djinn power in the series ==
The djinn are the guardians of luck, so they derive their power from luck or fate. Much of the narrative thus comes from those who promote good luck, who are attempting to combat those who promote bad luck. The djinn power that all djinn possess is directly linked to their own lifelines, fueled by fire. Every wish granted costs the djinn a portion of their life force and shortens their lifespan. The energy lost cannot be regained and the older a djinn is, the more force is drained from them. Because of their connection with fire, djinn are immune to it and can not be burnt or killed by it.

The exact limits of djinn power vary with age and experience, but what all djinn have in common is that when they use their power they must picture and think about what exactly they will use their power for, be it making an object appear and disappear or granting a wish. Djinn power has limits, as djinn cannot bring back anything from the dead. Djinn power cannot affect the flow of time and cannot create copies of themselves; it also generally cannot undo the spells of another djinn.

== Characters ==
=== Philippa Gaunt ===
Philippa Gaunt is the twin of John Gaunt. Philippa is shorter with red hair and glasses, like her father. She prefers to be called Phil rather than Philippa. Like her brother John, she is claustrophobic and dislikes loud noises. Philippa is described as the more intellectual twin.

=== John Gaunt ===
John Gaunt is the twin of Philippa Gaunt. John is described as tall and dark, and previously pimply. John, like most djinn, is claustrophobic but as seen in The Akhenaten Adventure, John panics more than Philippa does. He has a strong dislike of vegetables, as revealed in The Blue Djinn of Babylon. He is quite athletic, and acquired more strength in the second book in order to fight off a bully physically.

=== Dybbuk Sachertorte ===
Dybbuk Sachertorte is a djinn friend of John and Philippa who prefers to go by the name of Buck. His mother is the djinn Doctor Sachertorte, who helps John and Philippa recover from their illness in The Blue Djinn of Babylon. He goes with them on their adventures in The Cobra King of Kathmandu. His favorite things are treasure hunts and old war movies. He, his mother, and his pet coyote, Colin, live in Palm Springs, California. He is romantically interested in Philippa.

=== Uncle Nimrod ===
Nimrod Plantagenet Godwin is the powerful djinn uncle of John and Philippa and de facto leader of the Marid. Nimrod is depicted as a loud djinn who enjoys the color red, and a near-expert at all things relating to djinn. Apparently, he has a strong dislike of jade as well as rubies. He is always seen with a cigar, and is talented in creating shapes with his cigar smoke which then turn real. Nimrod's companion is Mr. Rakshasas, who he always keeps in his pocket. He first appeared in a dream of John's and Philippa's simultaneously, when their wisdom teeth or "dragon teeth" were extracted.

=== Mr. Harry Groanin ===
Mr. Harry Groanin is Nimrod's one-armed butler. Groanin freed Nimrod from confinement and won three wishes. After wasting his first two wishes, he became Nimrod's butler so he could properly consider how to use his third wish, and to make sure Nimrod does not trick him. He uses his third wish to help locate a trapped Nimrod and feels quite liberated afterwards.

=== Mr. Rakshasas ===
Mr. Rakshasas is Nimrod's djinn friend. Mr. Rakshasas has an Irish accent which he got from watching Irish shows in order to learn English. He feels more at home in his lamp than outside of it, following a long period of forced confinement in a milk bottle thanks to a djinn from the Ghul tribe. He is afraid of large and open spaces. He is considered a leading djinn expert on the Baghdad Rules, a series of conventions regulating wishes and wish granting. In the fourth book of the series, he is absorbed by one of the Terracotta warriors. In Hindi, the word Rakshasas generally means 'monster', 'greedy', or even 'demon'. However, he mostly resembles one of the rare "good Rakshasa", Vibhishana.

=== Layla Gaunt ===
Layla Gaunt is an extremely tall and glamorous woman, the eccentric mother of John and Philippa, and sister to Nimrod. She first appears as a very nice and allowing mother, telling John that naming one of the dogs Elvis would be a nice change. From then and through the series, she is depicted as an extremely tall djinn who had the media clamouring for her. She had cut herself off from the djinn world, including dropping the use of her powers right after turning her husband's murderous brothers into pet dogs. She finally began using her powers again to turn an assassin, hired to kill John and Phillipa, into a cat, who they took in as a pet and named Monty. She had renounced the use of her djinn powers after she attempted to save her daughter Philippa from her mother Ayesha. Ayesha wished her to become the new Blue Djinn of Babylon, a position Layla did not desire, resulting in the kidnapping of Philippa in order to force Layla to take the position. In The Cobra King of Kathmandu, Layla Gaunt leaves her family forever in order to become the next Blue Djinn.

=== Edward Gaunt ===
The father of the twins Philippa and John Gaunt. He is fearful of the twins' powers after their mother turned his two brothers into dogs. Described as absentminded, but a brilliant and a good father, he is quite fond of antiques and is a successful banker. During the end of the third book he becomes a victim of the Methuselah Binding (which causes him to age several years), cast by Layla Gaunt to prevent John and Philipa from attempting to stop her from being the next Blue Djinn after Ayesha. He is short and has glasses.

== The Six Tribes of Djinn ==
=== Good Tribes ===
Marid

- John Gaunt
- Philippa Gaunt
- Layla Gaunt
- Nimrod Godwin
- Mr Rakshasas
- Ayesha Godwin
- Dybbuk Sachertorte (Dybbuk is listed under Marid and Ifrit; his mother, Jenny, had Dybbuk with Iblis who had inhabited Jenny's husband)
- Jenny Sachertorte
- Faustina Sachertorte

Jinn

- Rabbi Joshua

Jann

- Frank Vodyannoy
- Zadie Eloko
- Baron Reinhold von Reinnerassig

=== Evil tribes ===
Ifrit

- Iblis Teer (former leader of the evil Djinn tribe)
- Rudyard Teer (Iblis Teer's son)
- Jonathan Teer
- Palis the Footlicker
- Dybbuk Sachertorte
- Jirjis Ibn Rajmus (current leader of the evil Djinn tribe)

Shaitan

- No Shaitans are seen in the series.

Ghul

- Lilith de Ghulle (she is in the djinverso tournament against Philippa)
- Mimi de Ghulle (Mother to Lilith)

== Planned adaptation ==
In 2007 DreamWorks acquired the rights for a film adaptation to be produced by Nina Jacobson. Later DreamWorks dropped the project and Paramount signed the film to distribute with Disney. Writers Michael Handelman, Lee Hall, and Dave Guion were all, at one point, involved in developing a script. In April 2013, Paramount was in talks with director/writer Robert Rugan to direct the film. However, the film was never produced after the release of the final book.
