= Journal of Philosophical Investigations =

- Discipline: Philosophy
- Language: Persian, English
- Edited by: Mohammad Asghari, Yahya Yasrebi

Publication details
- History: 2007–present
- Publisher: University of Tabriz (Iran)
- Frequency: Quarterly
- ISO 4: Find out here

Indexing
- ISSN: 2251-7960 (print); 2423-4419 (web)

Links
- Journal homepage; Online access; Online archive

Journal of Philosophical Investigations (Persian: مجله پژوهش‌های فلسفی) is a quarterly open access peer-reviewed academic journal of philosophy established in 2007 and published by the Department of Philosophy of the University of Tabriz.

== Abstracting and indexing ==
As of 2023 the journal has been indexed by Scopus, Academic Search Ultimate, Directory of Open Access Journals, Arab World Research Source, Al Masdar (EBSCO), ERIH Plus and JUFO Portal. The journal was selected as the top humanities journal in Iran in the year 2024 by the Ministry of Science, Research and Technology.
