= Bernie Gunther =

Fictional detective

- First appearance: March Violets (1989)
- Last appearance: Metropolis (2019)
- Created by: Philip Kerr
- Portrayed by: Jack Lowden

In-universe information
- Gender: Male
- Occupation: Policeman, private investigator
- Nationality: German

Bernhard "Bernie" Gunther is a fictional German detective created by the Scottish author Philip Kerr. Throughout the series of fourteen novels, he serves as both a homicide investigator of the Berlin Police and later a private detective. During the Nazi era he is enlisted back into the service of Kriminalpolizei at the order of Reinhard Heydrich.

Kerr originally produced the "Berlin Noir" trilogy of novels between 1989 and 1991. After a fifteen year hiatus the character returned in The One from the Other. In the following entry A Quiet Flame Kerr shifted the setting of the later novels away from postwar Germany. In 1949 after a complex case, Gunther escapes West Germany to Argentina by an underground network assisting Nazi figures. His later cases take him to Havana and Athens. The final entry in the series was the prequel Metropolis (2019) which took Gunter back to his roots as an officer of the murder squad in Berlin under Ernst Gennat in 1928.

== Novels ==
Original Berlin Noir trilogy

- March Violets (1989)
- The Pale Criminal (1990)
- A German Requiem (1991)

Later "Bernie Gunther" novels

- The One from the Other (2006)
- A Quiet Flame (2008)
- If the Dead Rise Not (2009)
- Field Grey (2010)
- Prague Fatale (2011)
- A Man Without Breath (2013)
- The Lady from Zagreb (2015)
- The Other Side of Silence (2016)
- Prussian Blue (2017)
- Greeks Bearing Gifts (2018)
- Metropolis (2019)

== Television ==
An Apple TV+ adaptation entitled Berlin Noir was announced in 2025, with Jack Lowden starring as Gunther. Filming began in 2026.

== Bibliography ==
- Geherin, David (2012-02-08). The Dragon Tattoo and Its Long Tail: The New Wave of European Crime Fiction in America. McFarland. ISBN 978-0-7864-6169-1.
- Kniesche, Thomas W. (2025-04-12). Investigating Crime in a Time of War: Historical Crime Fiction and the Representation of Fascism. Springer Nature. ISBN 978-3-031-87232-7.
- Rau, Petra (2013). Our Nazis: Representations of Fascism in Contemporary Literature and Film. Edinburgh University Press. doi:10.3366/j.ctt3fgswj. ISBN 978-0-7486-6864-9.
- Sandberg, Eric (2018-04-12). 100 Greatest Literary Detectives. Bloomsbury Academic. ISBN 978-1-4422-7822-6.
