= The Pale Criminal =

1990 novel by Philip Kerr

- First edition
- Author: Philip Kerr
- Language: English
- Series: Berlin Noir
- Genre: Crime, Detective, Historical mystery
- Publisher: Viking Press, London
- Publication date: 1990
- Publication place: United Kingdom
- Media type: Print (Hardback & Paperback)
- Pages: 274 pp (Hardback edition)
- ISBN: 0-670-82433-X
- OCLC: 21653181
- Dewey Decimal: 823/.914 20
- LC Class: PR6061.E784 P3 1990
- Preceded by: March Violets
- Followed by: A German Requiem

The Pale Criminal is a historical detective novel and the second in the Berlin Noir trilogy of Bernhard Gunther novels written by Philip Kerr.

== Plot ==
Set in 1938, two years after the events of March Violets, Bernhard (Bernie) Gunther has taken Bruno Stahlecker, another ex-police officer, as his partner. The two are working on a case where a Frau Lange, owner of a large publishing house, is being blackmailed for the homosexual love letters her son Reinhardt sent to his psychotherapist Dr. Kindermann. Gunther and Stahlecker discover the blackmailer to be Klaus Hering, a disgruntled employee of Kindermann. Bruno is killed during a stakeout at Hering's apartment, and shortly thereafter Hering is found hanging in the apartment. Around that time, Gunther is summoned to the Gestapo offices by Arthur Nebe and there Reinhard Heydrich forces Gunther to look for a serial sex murderer, who is killing blond and blue-eyed teenage girls in Berlin and making fools of the police. Gunther has no choice but to accept the temporary post of Kriminalkommissar in Heydrich's state Security Service, with a team of policemen working underneath him.

Gunther and his team then follow a number of dead end leads: A Jewish man held on suspicion, Joseph Kahn, is determined to be too improbable a suspect by an expert on psychotherapy, but dies in custody. Officially he committed suicide. However, Arthur Nebe suggests that he had been killed; A violent sexual deviant, Gottfried Bautz, is captured but when an anonymous caller reveals the location of a fifth victim while he is in jail, he must also be let go.

Gunther and a colleague then make a trip to Nuremberg, where they plan to investigate publisher and government administrator Julius Streicher, whom they suspect might be connected to the murders because of the similarity between the imagery depicted in his newspaper Der Stürmer and the murders. They have the well-known depravity of Streicher confirmed to them by the local police chief, but fail to formally connect him to the murders. While they are there, they also learn of the sixth murder and promptly return to Berlin.

Gunther and his team then focus their investigation on the family of the latest victim, Emmeline Steiniger, who lived along with her stepmother Hildegard. In the meantime another girl, Lisa Ganz, disappears. About two weeks later, a second anonymous tip leads to the discovery of her body. When Gunther interrogates the Ganz parents, they act strangely and eventually reveal they had hired a private detective, Rolf Vogelmann, to help them find their daughter. Vogelmann is known by name to Gunther from his biweekly newspaper ads which, as Gunther later finds out, are bankrolled by the Lange publishing house.

Following up on his suspicion of Vogelmann, Gunther teams up with Hildegard Steiniger and, pretending to be a couple, call on Vogelmann to hire him to help them find their daughter. A few days after the meeting, Vogelmann shows up with a Dr. Otto Rahn at Steiniger's apartment when Gunther luckily happens to be there. Claiming his searches have yielded no clues, Vogelmann and Rahn encourage the Steinigers to attend a séance as another option to try to find Emmeline. They accept, after which Gunther learns that Rahn is in the SS.

Gunther and Steiniger keep up their deception and attend the séance at the house of the medium, Karl Maria Weisthor. Also in attendance are Vogelmann, Heinrich Himmler, Reinhardt Lange, and Dr. Kindermann. During the séance, Weisthor pretends to summon the spirit of Emmeline Steiniger and that it reveals its location. Afterward the "Steinigers" leave but Gunther doubles back to investigate Weisthor's house. There he espies Weisthof, Rahn, and Kindermann, and hears them comment on how they set up the bogus séance to control Himmler for political means, including to excite the population of Berlin against the Jews through propaganda to the effect that they must be responsible for the murders. He also discovers a series of letters confirming the plot mentioned by Weisthor and company as "Project Krist", and one letter convening many top-ranking SS officers to a "Court of Honour" at a castle in the village of Wewelsburg.

As expected, Emmeline Steiniger's body is "discovered" a few days later. Gunther picks up Reinhardt Lange and extracts a confession that reveals Kindermann and Rahn killed Stahlecker and confirms how he, Lange, funded Vogelmann as a device to recruit the parents of murder victims to séances and give credibility to the depraved occultist apparatus of Weisthor, Kindermann, and Rahn. He then drives with Lange to Kindermann's clinic to retrieve the case file of Wiesthor as evidence. There, he finds Kindermann's files, including one describing Weisthor as a lunatic, one referring to Lange as a "neurotic effeminate" and, he is surprised to discover, a file on Inge Lorenz, to whom Gunther was previously attached (see March Violets). When Kindermann shows up, a fight ensues in which Kindermann kills Lange, and Gunther knocks Kindermann out. Gunther then packs Kindermann in a car and heads out to Wewelsburg to attend the SS Court of Honor.

Kindermann comes to in the car and arrogantly volunteers additional background information related to Project Krist. This way, Gunther also learns that Kindermann was treating Inge Lorenz for depression using cocaine and that she became addicted and eventually overdosed in his clinic. Further on the way to Wewelsburg, Gunther stops the car, kills Kindermann in cold blood, and moves on.

At the Court of Honor, Gunther manages to explain everything to Heydrich, and eventually Weisthor and Rahn are exposed as criminals. Himmler, whose plan against the Jewish population has apparently failed, holds his peace after a brief outburst against Gunther. The pogrom against the Jews still proceeds, however.

== Major themes ==
Similar to March Violets, The Pale Criminal is permeated by an atmosphere of Nazi brutality, arbitrariness, and anti-Semitism. In addition, the plot also involves many more philosophical and psychological themes including homosexuality, drug addiction, mental health, psychotherapy, and spiritualism.

=== Historical elements ===
The story takes place between 26 August and 10 November 1938, a time when Hitler is setting the stage for his European war. Although they are not material to the plot, some important geopolitical events are on the narrator's mind and explicitly referred to in the novel, in particular the Munich Agreement and the Kristallnacht.

== Development History ==
=== Publication history ===
- 1990, UK, Viking, ISBN 978-0670824335, Pub date 14 May 1990, Hardback
- 1991, UK, Penguin, ISBN 978-0140114676, Pub date 28 March 1991, Paperback
- 1993, UK, Penguin, ISBN 978-0140231700, Pub date 29 April 1993 (as the second part of the "Berlin Noir" paperback)

=== Explanation of the novel's title ===
There is no explicit mention in the novel of who the "pale criminal" actually is. Many characters are at one point or another described as "pale", including Weisthor, one of the main architects of Project Krist ("[Weisthor] seemed listless and pale, almost as if he really had been in contact with the spirit world."). The expression pale criminal also notably refers to an enigmatic passage in Nietzsche's book Thus Spoke Zarathustra.
