= A Philosophical Investigation =

- First edition (UK)
- Author: Philip Kerr
- Language: English
- Genre: Thriller
- Publisher: Chatto and Windus (UK); Farrar Straus & Giroux (US)
- Publication date: 1992 (UK), 1993 (US)
- Publication place: United Kingdom
- Media type: Print (Hardcover) & Paperback
- Pages: 330 pp
- ISBN: 0-7011-4553-6
- OCLC: 314182622

A Philosophical Investigation is a 1992 techno-thriller by Philip Kerr.

== Plot summary ==
In a near-future, a British neuroscientist named Professor Burgess Phelan has discovered a portion of the brain, the VMN, that is typically twice the size in men as it is in women. In certain men, however (approximately 1 in 100,000), it is the same size as a woman's, and that abnormality is an exceptionally accurate indicator of violent sociopathy. Professor Phelan developed an imaging device called L.O.M.B.R.O.S.O. (Localisation of Modullar Brain Resonations Obliging Social Orthopraxy) used to help diagnose men with the VMN deficiency.

In the interests of public safety, the Lombroso institute is set up to test all the men in Britain. Males are enticed with ad campaigns to submit for testing; those who are VMN-negative are given confidential treatment, including counselling and drugs, and assigned a code name out of the Penguin book of Great Thinkers (e.g., Shakespeare, Plato, etc.). The police aren't given the names of the VMN-negative, but they are allowed to confirm whether or not a particular person is in the Lombroso Institutes system as VMN-negative.

"Wittgenstein" is the code name of a VMN-negative who, until he was made aware of his status, was living a well-adjusted, if solitary, life, venting his sociopathic tendencies harmlessly through virtual reality entertainment systems. Upon discovering his pathology, though, he undertakes a public service of his own: after hacking into the Lombroso Institute's systems and obtaining a list of all VMN-negative men in Britain, he undertakes to kill them all.

The narrative unfolds from a dual perspective: Wittgenstein's, and the female police lieutenant, Isadora "Jake" Jakowicz, assigned to catch him. Wittgenstein's portion is told from the first person as a diary of his assassinations and subsequent downfall; the detective's portion is told in a more traditional third-person perspective.

== Themes ==
In the novel's setting, the national government was elected partly on a platform of "retributive justice", rather than rehabilitative, and punitive coma has replaced the death penalty (and, to a lesser extent, incarceration) as punishment for extreme crimes. In its favour, punitive coma is safely reversed, should someone later prove innocent; as well, prison costs have plunged since the inmates are sentenced to years of sleep rather than restraint, and require much less guarding and care. Opponents of punitive coma (of whom Jake is one) argue that the state is now stealing years from people's lives, and giving the guilty no opportunity to rehabilitate themselves; thus, punitive coma is inhumane. This position is defeated, however, by proponents who observe that any long-term space travel will necessarily involve long-term medically induced comas of the same kind, so the process itself is not inhumane; furthermore, criminals are not subject to the dangerous criminal environment of prison, so punitive coma may be considered a more, rather than less, humane punishment.

A portion of the narrative involves the use of a Cambridge philosophy professor to engage Wittgenstein in a debate on the morality of his actions. Since the killer comes to see his whole act through the lens of the real Wittgenstein's philosophy (including his mid-career reversal following Tractatus Logico-Philosophicus), it's hoped that he will be amenable to philosophical persuasion. However, as Wittgenstein's killings continue, the government presses the Cambridge don to talk Wittgenstein into committing suicide, a position with which the philosopher agrees, much to Jake's dismay.
