= Rebecca Wait =

British author

Rebecca Wait is a British writer. She has written five novels, selling her debut, The View On The Way Down, to Picador at the age of 24. She has contributed to New Statesman and The Independent. As of 2026 she lives in Buckinghamshire.

== Novels ==
- The View On The Way Down (2013)
- The Followers (2015)
- Our Fathers (2020)
- I'm Sorry You Feel That Way (2022)
- Havoc (2025)
