= A German Requiem (novel) =

1991 novel by Philip Kerr

- First edition
- Author: Philip Kerr
- Language: English
- Series: Berlin Noir
- Genre: Crime, Detective, Historical mystery
- Published: 1991 (Viking Press, London)
- Publication place: United Kingdom
- Media type: Print (Hardback and Paperback)
- ISBN: 978-0-670-83516-4
- OCLC: 23903789
- Dewey Decimal: 823/.914 20
- LC Class: PR6061.E784 G47 1991
- Preceded by: The Pale Criminal

A German Requiem is a 1991 historical detective novel and the last in the Berlin Noir trilogy of Bernhard Gunther novels written by Philip Kerr.

== Plot ==
After spending the latter part of World War II in a Soviet prisoner-of-war camp, 1947 sees Bernhard Gunther now married to a wife who is trading sex with U.S. Army officers for scarce goods. Berlin and Vienna were captured by the Red Army, so Germans, former Nazis, Allied occupiers, and Gunther have the Russians to contend with. An old colleague from Gunther's days in Berlin, a dirty cop, war criminal, and smuggler named Emil Becker, has been accused and jailed in Vienna for the killing of an American officer called Linden. A high-ranking MVD officer named Poroshin, who claims to be a friend of Becker, tries to recruit Gunther to investigate the case and get Becker exonerated in exchange for a large fee. According to Poroshin, after acting as a secret Vienna-Berlin courier for a certain König, Becker was framed for the murder of Linden, who Becker had met through König.

Gunther takes a train to Vienna and visits Becker in jail, where he learns that Becker's henchmen had been killed trying to find König and his girlfriend Lotte Hartmann at Becker's request. Gunther starts his investigation in Vienna, by attending Linden's funeral, where he is accosted by Roy Shields, an American MP. At approximately the same time, Gunther rescues a recent acquaintance, Veronika, a local prostitute he met as part of the investigation, from rape by two Russian soldiers. As part of the intervention, Gunther gets knocked down and is himself rescued in extremis by John Belinsky, a man bearing identification associating him with the American Counter-Intelligence Corps (CIC) that had been covertly tailing him. They fraternize, Belinsky admits to also investigating the murder of Linden, and they agree to collaborate.

When Gunther discovers the whereabouts of Lotte Hartman, he teams up with Belinsky to organize a scheme in which Gunther and Lotte would be somehow about be arrested and jailed by the Russians, so that Gunther could ingratiate himself with her by obtaining her freedom. The scheme works and Gunther is eventually approached by König, who wants to repay him from springing Lotte. After they meet, König is impressed by Gunther's past credentials and eventually, recruits him in a secret organization of former Nazis called the "Org", which Gunther accepts to infiltrate with the knowledge of Belinsky. Gunther soon finds out that Becker was also in the Org, for which he was acting as a double agent for his friend Poroshin.

One night, Veronika finds Gunther to ask for his help getting rid of the body of a "client", Heim, who died of a heart attack in her bed. Gunther, with the help of Belinsky, oblige and as part of the operation discover that Heim was a dentist specializing in teeth extractions, visibly for the purpose of making Nazis escape identification through dental records. At that point Belinsky reveals that he is actually looking for Heinrich Müller, the former head of the Gestapo, who faked his death and is suspected of having killed Linden. Belinsky asks Gunther to find Müller, which would allow him to free Becker. As Gunther's infiltration of the Org progresses, he eventually gets to meet Arthur Nebe, who was also presumed dead. It now becomes clear that the members of the Org had all received new identities to hide their Nazi past, which involved the removal of their teeth. To catch Müller, Gunther and Belinsky organize a sting operation at the vineyard estate of Nebe in Grinzing on the occasion of a formal meeting of the Org.

Gunther shows up to the meeting early to look for Veronika, who had disappeared in the meantime, but gets intercepted by a murderous Latvian guard before being rescued by Nebe. He nevertheless gets to meet with Müller, who ends up believing his cover. As he moves around the house to signal from a window for Belinsky to storm the property, Gunther discovers that Veronika is being tortured in the cellar by König. He frees her but is taken down by the Latvian again. His cover blown, Gunther gets interrogated by Müller under threat that they will crush Veronika in a wine press. Gunther admits everything he knows but Veronika gets crushed anyway. Later, Nebe visits Gunther in his cell and tells him the complete story of Linden so he can feed it back to Müller to avoid further torture. During their conversation Nebe eats a cake poisoned by Gunther and dies, allowing Gunther to escape the property in a car which he later crashes during the pursuit. The novel ends as Gunther recovers and learns from Shield that Becker had been hanged and Belinsky was not a CIC officer, but an agent of Poroshin.

== Major themes ==
The major themes of the novel includes the hardship of post-war conditions in Germany and Austria, occupation by the Allied Powers, espionage activities between them, and the secret post-war resurgence of Nazi war criminals.

=== Historical elements ===
Bernhard Gunther's investigation parallels the filming of The Third Man by a British film crew in the city and what happens to him mirrors the plot of the film in subtle ways.

== Development History ==
=== Publication history ===
- 1991, UK, Viking, ISBN 978-0670835164, Pub date 28 March 1991, Hardback
- 1992, UK, Penguin, ISBN 978-0140175615, Pub date 24 September 1992, Paperback
- 1993, UK, Penguin, ISBN 978-0140231700, Pub date 29 April 1993 (as the third part of the "Berlin Noir" paperback)

=== Explanation of the novel's title ===
The novel's front matter includes an excerpt from the poem "A German Requiem" by James Fenton.
