= Philip Kerr =

Scottish novelist (1956–2018)

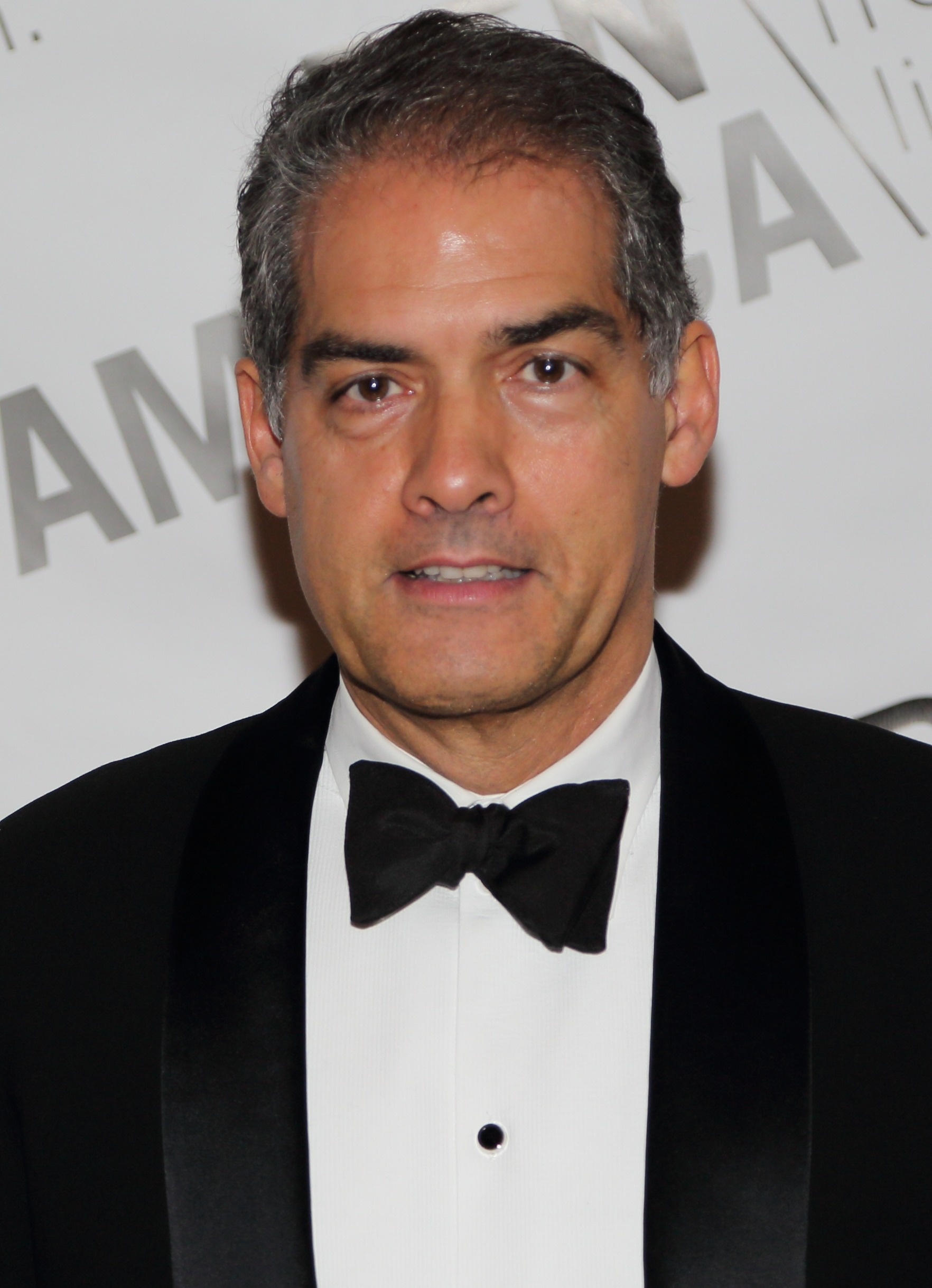
- Kerr at PEN American Center in 2014
- Born: Philip Ballantyne Kerr; 22 February 1956; Edinburgh, Scotland
- Died: 23 March 2018 (aged 62); London, England
- Occupation: Author
- Spouse: Jane Thynne (m. 19??)
- Children: 3
- Writing career
- Pen name: P. B. Kerr
- Website: philipkerr.org

Philip Ballantyne Kerr (22 February 1956 – 23 March 2018) was a Scottish author, best known for his Bernie Gunther series of historical detective thrillers.

== Early life ==
Kerr was born in Edinburgh, Scotland, where his father was an engineer and his mother worked as a secretary. He was educated at a grammar school in Northampton. He studied at the University of Birmingham from 1974 to 1980, gaining a master's degree in law and philosophy. Kerr worked as an advertising copywriter for Saatchi & Saatchi before becoming a full-time writer in 1989. In a 2012 interview, Kerr noted that he began his literary career at the age of twelve by writing pornographic stories and lending them to classmates for a fee.

== Career ==
A writer of both adult fiction and non-fiction, he is known for the Bernhard "Bernie" Gunther series of 14 historical thrillers set in Germany and elsewhere during the 1930s, the Second World War and the Cold War. He also wrote children's books under the name P. B. Kerr, including the Children of the Lamp series. Kerr wrote for The Sunday Times, the Evening Standard, and the New Statesman. He was married to fellow novelist Jane Thynne; they lived in Wimbledon, London, and had three children. While fighting cancer, he completed the fourteenth Bernie Gunther novel, Metropolis, which was published after his death, in 2019.

== Awards and honours ==
In 1993, Kerr was named in Granta's list of Best Young British Novelists. In 2009, If the Dead Rise Not won the world's most lucrative crime fiction award, the RBA Prize for Crime Writing worth €125,000. The book also won the British Crime Writers' Association's Ellis Peters Historic Crime Award that same year. His novel, Prussian Blue, was longlisted for the 2018 Walter Scott Prize.

== Death ==
Kerr died at age 62 from bladder cancer on 23 March 2018.

== Publications ==
=== Novels ===
==== Bernie Gunther series ====
- "Berlin Noir" trilogy, republished 1993 by Penguin Books in one volume. ISBN 978-0-14-023170-0.
  - March Violets. London: Viking, 1989. ISBN 0-670-82431-3, set in 1936
  - The Pale Criminal. London: Viking, 1990. ISBN 0-670-82433-X, set in 1938
  - A German Requiem. London: Viking, 1991. ISBN 0-670-83516-1, set in 1947–48
- Later "Bernie Gunther" novels
  - The One from the Other. New York: Putnam, 2006. ISBN 978-0-399-15299-3, set in 1949 (intro set in 1937)
  - A Quiet Flame. London: Quercus, 2008. ISBN 978-1-84724-356-0, set in 1950 and 1932–33
  - If the Dead Rise Not. London: Quercus, 2009. ISBN 978-1-84724-942-5, set in 1934 and 1954
  - Field Grey. (Field Gray in USA) London: Quercus, 2010. ISBN 978-1-84916-412-2, set in 1954 with flashbacks from 1941, 1931, 1940, & 1945/46.
  - Prague Fatale. London: Quercus, 2011 ISBN 978-1-84916-415-3, set in 1941
  - A Man Without Breath. London: Quercus, 2013. ISBN 978-1-78087-624-5, set in 1943
  - The Lady from Zagreb. London: Quercus, 2015. ISBN 978-1-78206-582-1, set in 1942–3, with framing scenes in 1956.
  - The Other Side of Silence. London: Quercus, 2016. ISBN 978-1-78429-514-1, set in 1956
  - Prussian Blue. London: Quercus, 2017. ISBN 978-1-78429-648-3, set in 1939, with framing scenes in 1956
  - Greeks Bearing Gifts. London: Quercus, 2018. ISBN 978-1-78429-652-0, set in 1957
  - Metropolis. London: Quercus, 2019. ISBN 978-1-78747-321-8, set in 1928

==== Scott Manson novels ====
- January Window. London: Head of Zeus, 23 October 2014. ISBN 1784082538, 978-1784082536 ASIN B00KX96D3G
- Hand of God. London: Head of Zeus, 4 June 2015. ASIN B00PULYUSW
- False Nine. London: Head of Zeus, 5 November 2015. ASIN B00UVK10AS

==== Stand alone novels ====
- A Philosophical Investigation. London: Chatto & Windus, 1992. ISBN 0-7011-4553-6
- Dead Meat. London: Chatto & Windus, 1993. ISBN 0-7011-4703-2
- Gridiron (variant title, US: The Grid). London: Chatto & Windus, 1995. ISBN 0-7011-6248-1
- Esau. London: Chatto & Windus, 1996. ISBN 0-7011-6281-3
- A Five Year Plan. London: Hutchinson, 1997. ISBN 0-09-180165-6
- The Second Angel. London: Orion, 1998. ISBN 0-7528-1443-5
- The Shot. London: Orion, 1999. ISBN 0-7528-1444-3
- Dark Matter: The Private Life of Sir Isaac Newton. New York: Crown, 2002. ISBN 0-609-60981-5
- Hitler's Peace. New York: Marian Wood, 2005. ISBN 0-399-15269-5
- Prayer. London: Quercus, 2013. ISBN 978-1782-06573-9
- The Winter Horses. New York: Knopf, 2014. ISBN 978-0-385-75543-6
- Research. London: Quercus, 2014. ISBN 978-1782-06577-7
- 1984.4. Hamburg: Rowohlt Verlag, 2021. ISBN 978-3499218576

==== Non fiction ====
- The Penguin Book of Lies. 1991;1996
- The Penguin Book of Fights, Feuds and Heartfelt Hatreds: An Anthology of Antipathy. 1992;1993

=== Children's fiction (as P. B. Kerr) ===
==== Children of the Lamp ====
- The Akhenaten Adventure. London: Scholastic Press, 2004. ISBN 0-439-96365-6
- The Blue Djinn of Babylon. London: Scholastic Press, 2005. ISBN 0-439-95950-0
- The Cobra King of Kathmandu. London: Scholastic Press, 2006. ISBN 0-439-95958-6
- The Day of the Djinn Warriors. London: Scholastic Press, 2007. ISBN 978-1-4071-0365-5
- The Eye of the Forest. London: Scholastic Press, 2009. ISBN 978-0-439-93215-8
- The Five Fakirs of Faizabad. London: Scholastic Press, 2010.
- The Grave Robbers of Genghis Khan. London: Scholastic Press, 2011.

==== Stand alone fiction ====
- One Small Step. London: Simon & Schuster, 2008 (paper). ISBN 978-1-84738-300-6
- The Most Frightening Story Ever Told. New York: Alfred A. Knopf, 2016. ISBN 978-0-553-52209-9
- Friedrich der Große Detektiv (Frederick the Great Detective). Rowohlt Verlag, 2017. ISBN 978-3-499-21791-3
