= Quercus (publisher) =

Independent publishing house

Quercus Publishing
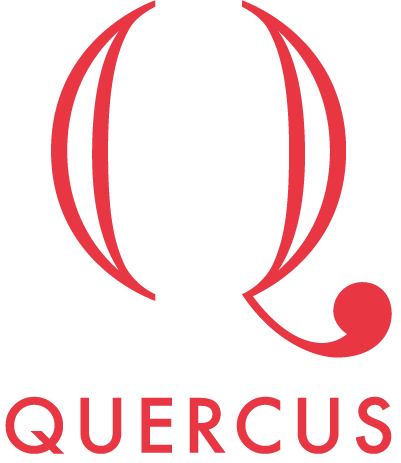
- Parent company: Hodder & Stoughton
- Status: acquired company
- Founded: 2004
- Founder: Mark Smith and Wayne Davies
- Country of origin: United Kingdom
- Headquarters location: London
- Publication types: Books
- Imprints: MacLehose Press, Jo Fletcher Books, riverrun
- Official website: www.quercusbooks.co.uk

Quercus is a formerly independent publishing house, based in London, that was acquired by Hodder & Stoughton in 2014. It was founded in 2004 by Mark Smith and Wayne Davies.

Quercus is known for its lists in crime (publishing such authors as Elly Griffiths, Philip Kerr, Peter May, Peter Temple), its MacLehose Press imprint (formerly headed by Christopher MacLehose), which publishes translated (often prize-winning) works by authors such as Philippe Claudel, Stieg Larsson, and Valerio Varesi, its literary fiction titles (including by Kimberley Freeman, Prajwal Parajuly) and its Jo Fletcher Books imprint, which publishes science fiction, fantasy and horror.

In 2023, Jo Fletcher Books was renamed to Arcadia.

== Details ==
Smith and Davies had previously worked together at the Orion Publishing Group.

In 2011, Quercus was chosen as the Bonnier Publishing Publisher of the Year at the Bookseller Industry Awards in London.

American imprint SilverOak was co-owned with Sterling Publishing. In March 2016, Quercus launched fiction and non-fiction imprint riverrun.

== Modern and contemporary fiction authors ==
- Lucy Diamond
- Laura Kay
- Beth O'Leary
- Rebecca Wait
- Adrienne Young
