= Small Island =

Small Island may refer to:

- Small Island (novel), a 2004 novel by Andrea Levy
  - Small Island (TV series), a 2009 British two-part television drama based on the novel
  - Small Island (play), a 2019 play by Helen Edmundson based on the novel
- Small Island (Antarctica), island in the Antarctic
- Small Island, one of the Wadham Islands in Newfoundland, Canada

== See also ==
- Notes from a Small Island, a 1995 travel book by Bill Bryson
- Small Isles, an archipelago part of the Inner Hebrides, Highland, Scotland
