= Jack Lowden =

Scottish actor (born 1990)

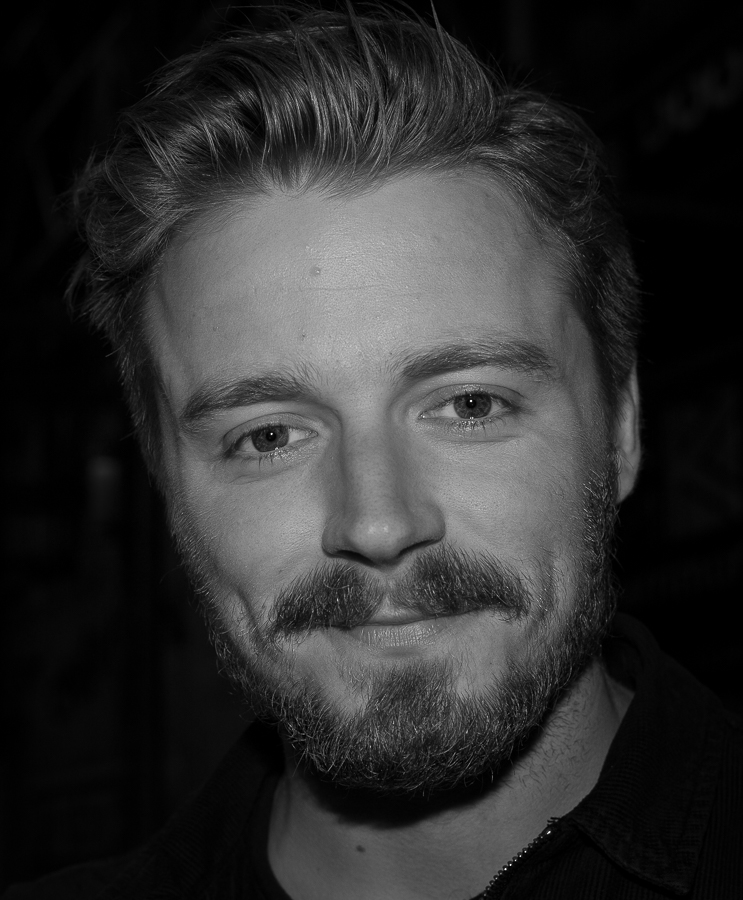
- Lowden at an England Is Mine Q&A in 2017
- Born: Jack Andrew Lowden; 2 June 1990 (age 36); Essex, England
- Education: Royal Scottish Academy of Music and Drama (BA)
- Occupations: Actor; producer
- Years active: 2010–present
- Spouse: Saoirse Ronan (m. 2024)
- Children: 1
- Relatives: Paul Ronan (father-in-law)

Jack Andrew Lowden (born 2 June 1990) is a Scottish actor. Known for his roles on stage and screen, he has received two BAFTA Awards and a Laurence Olivier Award as well as nominations for two Primetime Emmy Awards and a Golden Globe Award.

Lowden has portrayed River Cartwright in the Apple TV crime series Slow Horses (2020–present), for which he has received nominations for two Primetime Emmy Awards and a Golden Globe Award. He has also acted in the miniseries The Passing Bells (2014), War & Peace (2016), and The Long Song (2018). On film, he won two BAFTA Scotland Awards for his roles in Calibre (2018) and Benediction (2021). Other films include '71 (2014), Tommy's Honour (2016), England Is Mine (2017), Dunkirk (2017), Mary Queen of Scots (2018), and Fighting with My Family (2019).

On stage, Lowden played Eric Liddell in the play Chariots of Fire (2012) and Oswald in Richard Eyre's adaptation of Henrik Ibsen's Ghosts (2013), the latter of which earned him a Laurence Olivier Award and an Ian Charleson Award.

== Early life and education ==
Jack Lowden was born in Essex in 1990 to Scottish parents. His parents went to England to have IVF treatment for the pregnancies and births of Jack and his younger brother Calum. He grew up in the Scottish village of Oxton. As a child, he attended dance classes but found that he was more suited to acting.

At the age of 10, Lowden's parents enrolled him in the Scottish Youth Theatre in Edinburgh. As a 12-year old, he played John in a Peter Pan pantomime at the King's Theatre, Edinburgh.

Lowden attended Earlston High School, where he starred as Buddy Holly in Buddy – The Buddy Holly Story and performed in various concerts. He was inspired to pursue acting professionally after seeing the play Black Watch on its first run in 2007. While in high school, he studied during summer school at the Royal Academy of Dramatic Arts in London. He also performed regularly at the Galashiels Amateur Operatic Society, where he played the lead in a 2008 production of The Boy Friend.

Lowden received a BA in acting from the Royal Scottish Academy of Music and Drama in Glasgow in 2011.

== Career ==
=== Early beginnings (2009–2011) ===
In 2009, at the age of 18, Lowden appeared in a television advertisement for Irn-Bru, sending up High School Musical. In 2010, he had a small part as the character Nick Fairclough on an episode of the Glasgow-set television series Being Victor.

In 2010–11, Lowden was the lead character, Cammy, in the National Theatre of Scotland's revival production of the Olivier Award-winning play Black Watch. The play is an incisive and topical look at the harsh reality of war, and depicts soldiers of the legendary historic Scottish Black Watch regiment serving in Iraq. He and the rest of the cast underwent gruelling physical training during the rehearsals period to get into military shape.

The Black Watch production toured to London (Barbican), Glasgow, Aberdeen, and Belfast, and in the U.S. to New York City, Washington, Chicago, Austin, and Chapel Hill. UK reviewers deemed Lowden "a clearly hugely promising young actor" "who carries off this amazing start to his career with assurance and maturity". In the U.S., The Washington Post described him as "quietly charismatic" and a "stand-out"; this was echoed by the Chicago Sun-Times, which called him "easily charismatic"; and the Chicago Tribune noted his "rich and finely detailed work".

=== Increased recognition on stage (2012–2015) ===
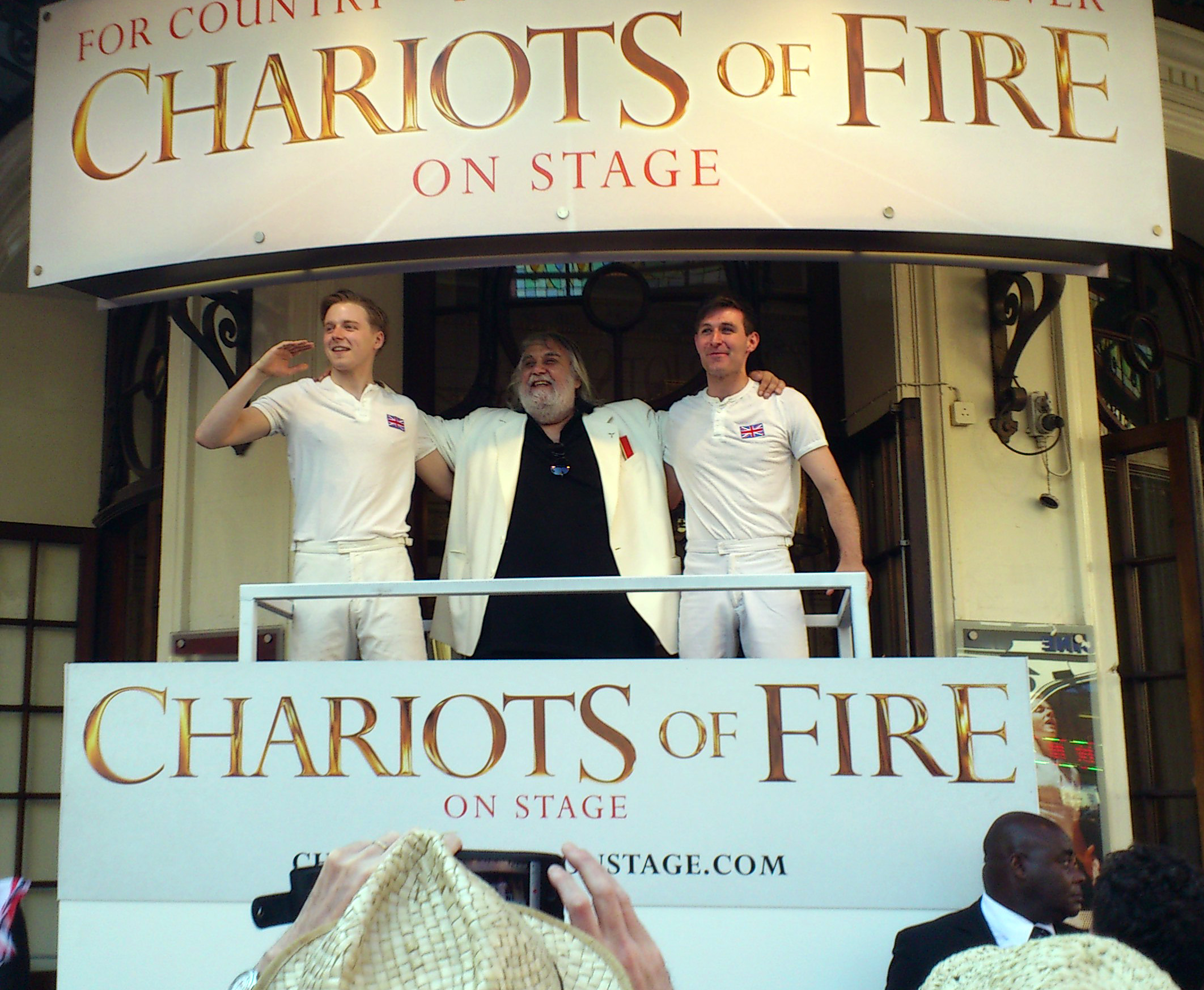
Lowden, Vangelis, and co-star James McArdle (r) at the Gielgud Theatre for the stage adaptation of Chariots of Fire (2012)

From 9 May 2012 to 5 January 2013, Lowden starred as Scottish runner and missionary Eric Liddell in Chariots of Fire, the stage adaptation of the film of the same name. The Olympic-themed play, created and produced specifically in honour of the 2012 London Summer Olympics, opened at London's Hampstead Theatre and transferred to the Gielgud Theatre in the West End in June 2012. Lowden's performance was widely praised, including by Libby Purves in The Times.

Onscreen, in 2012, he appeared in the ITV drama Mrs Biggs as Alan Wright, who has an affair with Charmian Biggs and gets her pregnant. In 2013, he played the pivotal role of the lead character's son, Adam, in the television series The Tunnel. The series is a British/French crime-drama co-production, and aired in the UK and in France; in the summer of 2016 it aired on PBS in the U.S. He also had a sizable role as a young British soldier in the 2014 film '71, which takes place in Belfast in 1971 during the Northern Ireland conflict.

In 2014, Lowden received both the Olivier Award for Best Actor in a Supporting Role, and also the Ian Charleson Award, for his role as Oswald in Richard Eyre's adaptation of Ibsen's Ghosts. The production ran from September 2013 to March 2014, opening at the Almeida Theatre and then transferring in December to the West End at Trafalgar Studios. A filmed February 2014 performance of the production screened in more than 275 UK and Irish cinemas on 26 June 2014. The entire filmed performance is viewable online.

In June 2014, Screen Daily named Lowden one of the UK Stars of Tomorrow.

He performed Orestes in Electra at the Old Vic in the autumn of 2014. The production starred Kristin Scott Thomas as his sister Electra, and Diana Quick played their mother Clytemnestra. Previews began 22 September, the official opening was 1 October, and the run continued in a limited engagement through to 20 December 2014.

On television, he starred as one of the two leads in the 2014 World War I BBC drama series The Passing Bells. It is the story of two youths, one from Germany and one from the UK, who enlist as soldiers at the beginning of the war.

=== Breakthrough (2016–2019) ===
Lowden portrayed Nikolai Rostov, one of the main characters, in the 2016 BBC miniseries War & Peace. The 6-part miniseries, which was broadcast around the world and positively reviewed, garnered Lowden the most exposure he had had thus far in his career.

In film he played the title role in Tommy's Honour (2016), about legendary Scottish golfing champion Old Tom Morris, played by Peter Mullan, and his complex and bittersweet relationship with his son Tom "Tommy" Morris Jr.; Lowden was nominated for Best Film Actor at the 2016 BAFTA Scotland Awards for his performance. He also portrayed British politician Tony Benn in a supporting role in A United Kingdom, a 2016 film about Seretse Khama and Ruth Williams Khama. In another supporting role, he was one of star Rachel Weisz's character's attorneys in Denial (2016), a fact-based legal-drama film about Holocaust denial which also starred Andrew Scott.

In April 2016, he was a finalist in the entertainment category at the 11th Young Scot Awards. In November 2016, the UK arts and entertainment magazine The List featured Lowden as one of The Hot 100 2016.

He played a Royal Air Force fighter pilot, one of the leading roles, in Christopher Nolan's World War II film Dunkirk, released in July 2017. And he portrayed Morrissey in a biopic of the singer titled England Is Mine, written and directed by Mark Gill; the film, which co-stars Jessica Brown Findlay, premiered at the closing gala of the Edinburgh International Film Festival on 2 July 2017 and went into wide release in August 2017.

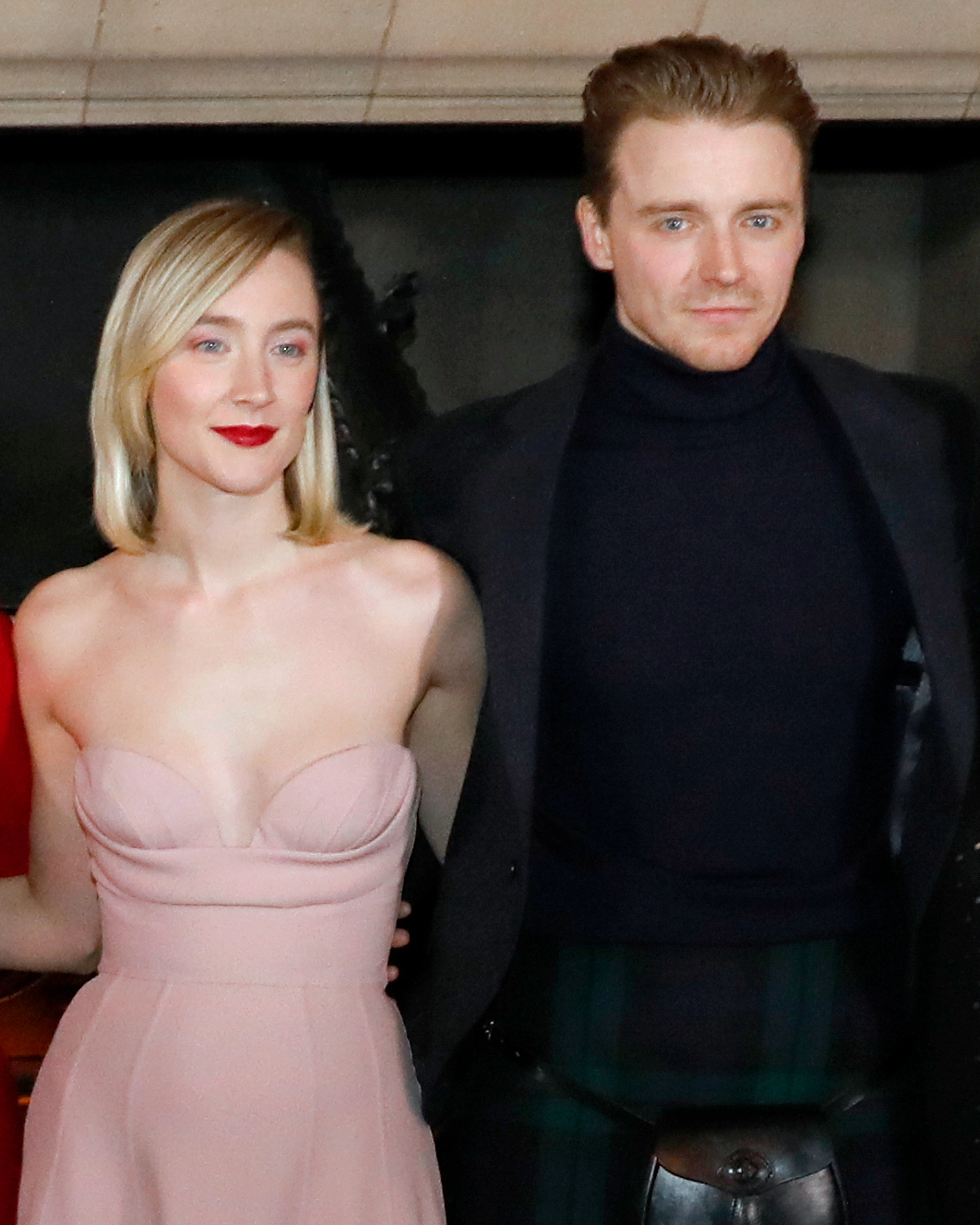
Lowden and actress Saoirse Ronan (left) co-starred together in Mary Queen of Scots (2018) and co-produced The Outrun (2024). They also married in 2024.

He co-starred with Martin McCann in a Scottish thriller, Calibre (2018), which began filming in November 2016, debuted at the 2018 Edinburgh International Film Festival, and was released globally on Netflix on 29 June 2018. Guy Lodge in Variety wrote of his performance, "[A] lead performance of through-the-wringer commitment by rising Scots star Jack Lowden. ... An Olivier Award-winning stage actor now settling into a quietly potent, empathetic screen presence, Lowden impressively holds it together through all these key changes, even when his character emphatically does not." Lowden won the 2018 British Academy Scotland Award for Best Film Actor for the performance.

On stage, from 28 September to 24 November 2018, Lowden starred opposite Hayley Atwell in Shakespeare's Measure for Measure, at the Donmar Warehouse in London, directed by Josie Rourke. It was a unique gender-reversal production of the work, and he and Atwell alternated the roles of Angelo and Isabella during the play. On television, in December 2018 he co-starred with Tamara Lawrance and Hayley Atwell, in a three-part BBC adaptation of Andrea Levy's novel The Long Song, about a slave on a sugar plantation in 19th-century Jamaica; the piece was filmed on location in the Dominican Republic.

He portrayed Lord Darnley in Mary Queen of Scots (2018), opposite Saoirse Ronan and directed by theatre director Josie Rourke, and Zak "Zodiac" Bevis in the 2019 comedy-drama WWE film Fighting with My Family, opposite Florence Pugh and directed by Steve Merchant. He appeared as FBI agent Crawford in the Al Capone biopic Capone (2020), starring his Dunkirk co-star Tom Hardy.

In February 2019, Lowden teamed up with Beta Cinema to form his own production company, Reiver Pictures, based in Edinburgh. This led to the production of a psychological thriller, Kindred, in which Lowden also starred alongside Tamara Lawrance and Fiona Shaw. He portrayed Siegfried Sassoon in the 2022 biopic Benediction and won the 2022 BAFTA Scotland Award for Best Actor for his performance.

=== Slow Horses and beyond (2020–present) ===
Lowden was announced to star in the Apple TV series Slow Horses in December 2020. He reprised his role for seasons two, three, four, five, and six. He was nominated at the 76th Primetime Emmy Awards in 2024 as Outstanding Supporting Actor in a Drama Series.

He joined Duncan Jones' upcoming film Rogue Trooper. In April 2025, it was announced that Lowden was cast as Mr. Darcy in Netflix's adaptation of Pride and Prejudice, to be released in 2026. Lowden will star as Bernie Gunther in Apple TV's period detective series Berlin Noir, based on Philip Kerr's novels.

In September 2026, his Slow Horses co-star Gary Oldman suggested that Lowden had been shortlisted to star as the next James Bond. Lowden did a screen test for the role in October 2026 in London, although it ultimately went to Robert Pattinson.

== Personal life ==
From 2019 to 2021, Lowden lived in Leith, Edinburgh, before moving back to the Scottish Borders in May 2021. He supports Scottish independence.

Since 2018, Lowden has been in a relationship with Irish actress Saoirse Ronan, his co-star in Mary Queen of Scots. In July 2024, Irish Independent reported that the couple had married in Edinburgh. Ronan gave birth to their first child in September 2025.

Lowden is a supporter of Broxburn Athletic Football Club and occasionally attends their matches. He presented a man of the match award to Broxburn player Calum Heath after a win away at Crossgates Primrose.

== Acting credits ==
Key
†	Denotes projects that have not yet been released

=== Film ===
Year	Title	Role	Notes
2013	U Want Me 2 Kill Him?	Henry	
2014	Ghosts	Oswald Alving	Filmed performance of West End play
2014	'71	Thompson "Thommo"	
2016	Tommy's Honour	Tom Morris Jr.	
2016	A United Kingdom	Tony Benn	
2016	Denial	James Libson	
2017	England Is Mine	Morrissey	
2017	Dunkirk	Collins	
2018	Calibre	Vaughn	
2018	Mary Queen of Scots	Lord Darnley	
2019	Fighting with My Family	Zak "Zodiac" Bevis	
2020	Capone	Stirling H. Crawford	
2020	Kindred	Thomas	Also co-producer
2021	Benediction	Siegfried Sassoon	Also executive producer
2024	The Outrun	—N/a	Producer
2025	Tornado	Little Sugar	
2025	The Fifth Step	Luka	Filmed performance of West End play
2025	Ella McCay	Ryan Newell	
2026	Vote Gavin Lyle	Gavin Lyle	Short film
2026	Rogue Trooper	Gunnar (voice)	

=== Television ===
Year	Title	Role	Notes
2010	Being Victor	Nick Fairclough	Episode: "Episode 3"
2012	Mrs Biggs	Alan Wright	2 episodes
2013	The Tunnel	Adam Roebuck	10 episodes
2014	The Passing Bells	Michael Lang	Television miniseries
2015	Wolf Hall	Thomas Wyatt	Episode: "Anna Regina"
2016	War & Peace	Nikolai Rostov	Television miniseries
2017	The Dreams of Bethany Mellmoth	Hunter	Television pilot
2018	The Long Song	Robert Goodwin	Television miniseries
2020	Small Axe	Ian Macdonald	Anthology film series; episode: "Mangrove"
2022–present	Slow Horses	River Cartwright	36 episodes
2023–2025	The Gold	Kenneth Noye	10 episodes
2024	The Lord of the Rings: The Rings of Power	Forodwaith Sauron	Episode: "Elven Kings Under the Sky"
2026	Pride and Prejudice †	Fitzwilliam Darcy	Post-production
TBA	Berlin Noir †	Bernhard "Bernie" Gunther	Post-production

=== Theatre ===
Year	Title	Role	Director	Playwright	Theatre
2010–2011	Black Watch	Cammy	John Tiffany	Gregory Burke	National Theatre of Scotland; UK/U.S. Tour
2012	Chariots of Fire	Eric Liddell	Edward Hall	Mike Bartlett; Colin Welland	Hampstead Theatre; Gielgud Theatre
2013–2014	Ghosts	Oswald Alving	Richard Eyre	Henrik Ibsen	Almeida Theatre; Trafalgar Studios
2014	Electra	Orestes	Ian Rickson	Sophocles	Old Vic
2018	Measure for Measure	Angelo; Isabella	Josie Rourke	William Shakespeare	Donmar Warehouse
2024–2025	The Fifth Step	Luka	Finn Den Hertog	David Ireland	National Theatre of Scotland @sohoplace

=== Audio ===
Year	Title	Role	Writer	Notes
2020	Weir of Hermiston	Archibald "Archie" Weir	Robert Louis Stevenson	BBC Radio 4
2023	An Eye for a Killing	Narrator	Colin MacDonald	BBC Radio 4
2023	David Copperfield	Uriah Heep	Charles Dickens	Audible
2025	Pretender Prince	Narrator	Colin MacDonald	BBC Radio 4
2025	Muckle Flugga	Narrator	Michael Pedersen	Audible

=== Video games ===
Year	Title	Role	Notes
2016	Battlefield 1	T. E. Lawrence	

== Awards and nominations ==
Year	Award	Category	Work	Result	Ref.
2014	Laurence Olivier Awards	Best Actor in a Supporting Role	Ghosts	Won	
2014	Ian Charleson Awards		Ghosts	Won	
2016	Young Scot Awards	Entertainment	War & Peace	Nominated	
2016	British Academy Scotland Awards	Best Actor in Film	Tommy's Honour	Nominated	
2017	Washington D.C. Area Film Critics Association Awards	Best Ensemble	Dunkirk	Nominated	
2018	Critics' Choice Awards	Best Acting Ensemble	Dunkirk	Nominated	
2018	British Academy Scotland Awards	Best Actor in Film	Calibre	Won	
2019	British Academy Scotland Awards	Best Actor in Film	Mary Queen of Scots	Nominated	
2020	British Academy Film Awards	EE Rising Star Award	Himself	Nominated	
2021	British Academy Scotland Awards	Best Actor in Television	Small Axe: Mangrove	Nominated	
2022	Trophée Chopard	Honouree	Himself	Honoured	
2022	British Academy Scotland Awards	Best Actor in Film	Benediction	Won	
2023	British Academy Television Awards	Best Supporting Actor	Slow Horses	Nominated	
2024	British Academy Television Awards	Best Supporting Actor	Slow Horses	Nominated	
2024	Primetime Emmy Awards	Outstanding Supporting Actor in a Drama Series	Slow Horses (for "Hard Lessons")	Nominated	
2024	British Academy Scotland Awards	Favourite Scot on Screen	Slow Horses	Nominated	
2024	British Independent Film Awards	Best British Independent Film	The Outrun	Nominated	
2025	Golden Globe Awards	Best Performance by an Actor in a Supporting Role on Television	Slow Horses	Nominated	
2025	British Academy Film Awards	Outstanding British Film	The Outrun	Nominated	
2025	Screen Actors Guild Awards	Outstanding Performance by an Ensemble in a Drama Series	Slow Horses	Nominated	
2025	British Academy Scotland Awards	Best Feature Film	The Outrun	Nominated	
2026	RTS Scotland Awards	Best Actor – Male	The Gold	Nominated	
2026	National Film Awards	Best Supporting Actor in a TV Series	Slow Horses	Nominated	
2026	Primetime Emmy Awards	Outstanding Supporting Actor in a Drama Series	Slow Horses (for "Circus")	Nominated	
2026	British Academy Scotland Awards	Best Actor in Television	Slow Horses	Nominated	
2026	GQ Men of the Year	Honouree	Himself	Honoured	
