= The Long Song (TV series) =

British television mini-series

- Genre: Historical drama
- Created by: Andrea Levy
- Based on: The Long Song by Andrea Levy
- Screenplay by: Sarah Williams
- Directed by: Mahalia Belo
- Starring: Tamara Lawrance; Hayley Atwell; Jack Lowden; Jordan Bolger; Sharon Duncan-Brewster; Gordon Brown; Ayesha Antoine; Leo Bill; Lenny Henry; Madeleine Mantock
- Composer: Jonathan Rhys Hill
- Country of origin: United Kingdom
- Original language: English
- No. of seasons: 1
- No. of episodes: 3

Production
- Producer: Roopesh Parekh
- Production location: Dominican Republic
- Production company: Heyday Television

Original release
- Network: BBC One
- Release: 18 December 2018 – 2018

The Long Song is a three-part BBC television serial, which is an adaptation of Andrea Levy's 2010 historical novel of the same name.

Produced by Heyday Television, its three episodes were adapted by Sarah Williams and directed by Mahalia Belo. It premiered on BBC One on 18 December 2018 and aired in the US on PBS on January 31, 2021, as part of the network's long-running series Masterpiece.

== Synopsis ==
The story is set in early-nineteenth-century colonial Jamaica, focusing on the final years of slavery on the island, including the Christmas Rebellion of 1831, and the transition to freedom that took place after its abolition in 1833. It follows the life of July (Tamara Lawrance), an enslaved woman on a sugarcane plantation. The adaptation explores many of the novel's themes, including colonialism, slavery, racism, violence and love.

== Cast ==
Tamara Lawrance plays July, the series' main character. Hayley Atwell plays Caroline Mortimer, the owner of the plantation, who eventually marries an idealistic overseer, Robert Goodwin (Jack Lowden). The cast also included Jordan Bolger, Sharon Duncan-Brewster, Gordon Brown, Ayesha Antoine, Leo Bill, Lenny Henry, and Madeleine Mantock in supporting roles.

== Reviews ==
It received generally favourable reviews from critics. The Guardian's Lucy Mangan awarded it four stars out of five, calling it "a beautiful, moving, horrifying adaption of [July's] unsimple tale, that honours the source and its subject." The Independent offered similar praise in a four-out-of-five-star review, which called it a "moving reminder of the cruelty of slavery." Stuart McGurk in GQ praised the acting, characterisation and story, but found the narration distracting and unnecessary. For a review in The Radio Times, Eleanor Bley Griffiths concluded that "With wonderful acting from Lawrance and Atwell, a brilliant story from Andrea Levy, and sensitive screenwriting from Sarah Williams, this drama may be airing right at the end of the year—but it truly deserves a spot on the list of best dramas of 2018."
