= Tamara Lawrance =

British actress (born 1994)

- Born: 15 July 1994 (age 32); London, England
- Education: St Dominic's Sixth Form College; Royal Academy of Dramatic Art
- Occupation: Actress

Tamara Lawrance (born 1994) is a British actress. She is known for her performances as Prince Harry's republican girlfriend in the 2017 BBC television film King Charles III, and as Viola in the 2017 production of Twelfth Night at the National Theatre cinecast internationally on NT Live. In 2018 she received the second prize at the Ian Charleson Awards for this performance as Viola.

WhatsOnStage named her one of "10 theatre faces to look out for in 2017" and The Guardian listed her in "20 talents set to take 2017 by storm".

In December 2018 she starred as Miss July, a former slave on a sugar plantation in 19th-century Jamaica, in the three-part BBC adaptation of Andrea Levy's novel The Long Song. In October 2023 she appeared in the BBC's prison drama Time, playing the role of Abi, who is serving a life sentence. In 2024, she played the title role in the miniseries Get Millie Black.

== Early life and education ==
She began acting in school plays at the age of six. When her secondary school did not offer theatre as an option until year 10, she convinced the drama teacher to set up a theatre club for younger students. At the Shakespeare Schools Festival, she played Puck in A Midsummer Night's Dream and the title role in Macbeth.

As a teenager, she lived in Enfield, and attended St Dominic's Sixth Form College in Harrow, London. In 2012, at the age of 17, she was one of eight winners in the Poetry Society's nationwide poetry competition SLAMbassadors UK.

Attending RADA, she graduated in 2015.

== Career ==
Lawrance began her professional career filming in the 2016 BBC miniseries Undercover, starring Adrian Lester and Sophie Okonedo; she played their eldest daughter Clem. She was then on stage, as Ma Rainey's girlfriend Dussie Mae in the 2016 revival of August Wilson's play Ma Rainey's Black Bottom at the National Theatre. The New Statesman noted her "electrifying presence and vocal nuance", and The Guardian called her "eye-catching".

She subsequently co-starred opposite Matt Smith at the Royal Court Theatre in Anthony Neilson's new play Unreachable (2016), about an obsessive film director. The experimental play received somewhat mixed reviews but Lawrance was widely praised, described as "extraordinary" (WhatsOnStage), "superb" (The Stage), and having "astonishing candour and directness" (The Guardian). The Hollywood Reporter wrote that Lawrance was "required to switch fluidly among different accents and emotional registers, with the most weighty dramatic monologues resting on her young shoulders. Bigger, brighter roles will surely follow." At year's end WhatsOnStage named her one of "10 theatre faces to look out for in 2017" and The Guardian listed her in "20 talents set to take 2017 by storm".

In 2017 she was Viola in Twelfth Night at the National Theatre, and a performance of the production was cinecast live around the world on NT Live. Reviewers called her performance "compelling" and "passionate", and Time Out called her "charismatic and loveable". She won second prize at the Ian Charleson Awards for the performance. She was Cordelia opposite Ian McKellen's Lear in the Chichester Festival Theatre's 2017 production of King Lear; critics praised her "heartfelt simplicity" and called her a "rising star".

On television, following Undercover (2016), she had a leading role as Prince Harry's revolutionary girlfriend in the 2017 BBC television film King Charles III. The work is a Shakespearean-style future history imagining of the current British royal family; The Guardian noted that "It's Lawrance who makes the blank verse sound least theatrical and most natural." Her next television appearance was as the client in one of the six episodes of the 2018 legal drama The Split. She also has a recurring role as Bonnie Sands in series 3 of the crime drama No Offence.

In film, in 2017 she had a supporting role in On Chesil Beach.

In December 2018 Lawrance starred as a slave on a sugar plantation in 19th-century Jamaica in the three-part BBC adaptation of Andrea Levy's novel The Long Song; her co-stars were Jack Lowden and Hayley Atwell. She also co-starred in Anthony Neilson's adaptation of Poe's The Tell-Tale Heart at the National Theatre beginning in December 2018 through 8 January 2019.

== Acting credits ==
=== Film ===
Year	Title	Role	Notes
2017	On Chesil Beach	Molly	
2020	Kindred	Charlotte	
2022	The Silent Twins	Jennifer Gibbons	
2025	The Man in My Basement	Bethany	
2026	Love of Your Life	Kali	

=== Television ===
Year	Title	Role	Notes
2016	Undercover	Clem Johnson	Miniseries
2017	King Charles III	Jess	TV movie
2018	The Split	Jaynie Lee	Episode: #1.3
2018	No Offence	Bonnie Sands	Series 3 (Recurring)
2018	The Long Song	July	3-part TV movie
2023	Time	Abi Cochrane	Main cast, series 2
2024	Mr Loverman	Maxine Walker	Main cast
2024	Get Millie Black	Millie-Jean Black	Lead, miniseries
2025	Juice	Maya Calatchi	Guest, series 2

=== Theatre ===
Year	Title	Role	Director	Playwright	Theatre
2016	Ma Rainey's Black Bottom	Dussie Mae	Dominic Cooke	August Wilson	National Theatre
2016	Unreachable	Natasha	Anthony Neilson	Anthony Neilson	Royal Court Theatre
2017	Twelfth Night	Viola	Simon Godwin	Shakespeare	National Theatre
2017	King Lear	Cordelia	Jonathan Munby	Shakespeare	Chichester Festival Theatre
2018–2019	The Tell-Tale Heart	Celeste/Camille	Anthony Neilson	Anthony Neilson	National Theatre
2024	The Comeuppance	Ursula	Eric Ting	Branden Jacobs-Jenkins	Almeida Theatre, London
2026	An Ideal Husband	Lady Gertrude Chiltern	Nicholai La Barrie	Oscar Wilde	Lyric Hammersmith
