= The Long Song =

2010 novel by Andrea Levy

- Author: Andrea Levy
- Language: English
- Genre: Historical fiction
- Set in: Jamaica
- Published: February 2010
- Publisher: Headline Review
- Publication place: UK
- Pages: 416
- Awards: Notable Book of the Year; Walter Scott Prize
- ISBN: 9780755359400
- Preceded by: Small Island

The Long Song is a historical novel by Andrea Levy published in 2010. It was the recipient of the Walter Scott Prize. It was Levy's fifth and final novel, following the 2004 publication of Small Island. In December 2018, a three-part television adaptation of the same name was broadcast on BBC One; The Long Song was aired on PBS in February 2021.

== Plot summary ==
The Long Song is written as a memoir by an elderly Jamaican woman living in early 19th-century Jamaica during the final years of slavery and the transition to freedom that took place thereafter. It tells the tale of a young slave girl, July, who lives at Amity, a prosperous sugarcane plantation. She lives through the 1831–1832 Baptist War, and then the beginning of freedom with the abolishment of slavery in 1833. Her mother, Kitty; the slaves working the plantation land; and the owner of the plantation, the white heiress Caroline Mortimer, also feature prominently.

== Themes ==
Themes of the book include: How it feels being a slave in Jamaica, racism, black versus white, landlord versus tenant, slavery and its abolition, slave uprisings, rape, the Baptist War, the role of the clergy, and love triangles.

== Reception ==
Kate Kellaway in The Observer, Tayari Jones in the Washington Post, Fernanda Eberstadt in The New York Times, and Amanda Craig in The Telegraph were among those who gave the novel positive reviews.

=== Influence ===
The Long Song was a major inspiration for Kuchenga Shenjé's The Library Thief. Shenjé also cited Levy as an influence for her own writing career.

== Awards ==
The Long Song was a finalist for the 2010 Man Booker Prize. It was the recipient of the 2011 Walter Scott Prize for historical fiction, with the judging panel saying that "Andrea Levy brings to this story such personal understanding and imaginative depth that her characters leap from the page, with all the resilience, humour and complexity of real people. There are no clichés or stereotypes here. The Long Song is quite simply a celebration of the triumphant human spirit in times of great adversity." The New York Times Book Review named it a Notable Book of the Year.

== Television adaptation ==
A three-part television adaptation of The Long Song, starring Tamara Lawrance, Jack Lowden, Hayley Atwell, and Lenny Henry was filmed in the Dominican Republic, and aired on BBC One in December 2018. A TV tie-in edition of the novel was released by Headline Publishing in 2018.
