= Calibre (film) =

2018 film by Matt Palmer

- Directed by: Matt Palmer
- Written by: Matt Palmer
- Produced by: Alastair Clark; Anna Griffin
- Starring: Jack Lowden; Martin McCann; Tony Curran
- Cinematography: Márk Györi
- Edited by: Chris Wyatt
- Music by: Anne Nikitin
- Production company: Wellington Films
- Distributed by: Netflix
- Release dates: 22 June 2018 (Edinburgh); 29 June 2018 (Netflix)
- Running time: 101 minutes
- Country: United Kingdom
- Language: English

Calibre is a 2018 British psychological thriller film written and directed by Matt Palmer. After a debut at the Edinburgh International Film Festival, it was released on 29 June 2018 on Netflix. It also had a limited release in select Curzon Cinemas in the UK from 21 October to 16 November 2018. The film stars Jack Lowden and Martin McCann, two hunters who are embroiled in a traumatising incident while on a hunting trip in the Scottish highlands and must escape the local village without arousing suspicion. The film received critical acclaim.

== Plot ==
Edinburgh businessman Marcus takes his childhood friend Vaughn, whose fiancée is newly pregnant, on a weekend hunting in the Scottish Highlands. They spend the evening at a village pub, where they meet community leader Logan and two young women Kara and Iona. After dancing and drinking, Marcus leaves with Kara, despite being warned to stay away. Vaughn and Iona nearly kiss before Vaughn mentions his pregnant fiancée. The two go to Iona's parents' bar where they sit up drinking and talking.

Next morning, Marcus wakes up a hungover Vaughn for their hunt. In the woods, at their hunting location, Vaughn realises he has forgotten ammunition for his rifle, so Marcus lends him one of his guns, violating firearm laws. On the hunt, the pair happen upon a deer. Vaughn takes aims and fires, but it suddenly turns, causing him to fatally hit a boy, unseen behind the deer. The boy's father arrives and, in a fit of grief, picks up Vaughn's gun and points it at him; but Marcus shoots the man. Vaughn wants to turn himself in but Marcus convinces him they will be arrested as murderers. Marcus hides the bodies and they drive off, hoping to claim that they were hunting in another area. However, Marcus learns that they are the only hunters in the area. He convinces a traumatised Vaughn to return later to bury the bodies.

Returning to the village, they are invited to dinner by Logan, who asks if Marcus can help find investors to revitalise the community. At night, they bury the bodies after Marcus retrieves the bullets with a knife. The next day, Brian, one of Logan's brothers, slashes their tires and attacks Marcus for sleeping with Kara and giving her cocaine. The mechanic tells Marcus the repairs will take a day, delaying their escape. Speaking to Logan's cousin Al, Vaughn learns that the deceased were Logan's nephew and brother-in-law. Al becomes suspicious when Marcus asks about "them" despite having only heard that Logan's nephew was missing.

Logan asks them to help with the search, which they accept to avoid arousing suspicion. A dog leads the party to the bodies. While the group digs them up, Marcus and Vaughn attempt to flee, but their fuel tank is ruptured by a bullet from Brian. Fleeing on foot, Vaughn stumbles and is injured by the dog, which Marcus stabs to death. As the group closes in, Marcus leaves Vaughn who is captured and taken to a farm, where he confesses. As Brian moves to kill Vaughn, Logan stops him as they hear the group has caught Marcus.

The next morning, Logan gives Vaughn an ultimatum: he must either kill Marcus, or Brian will kill them both. Vaughn initially refuses, even after being reminded of his fiancée and unborn child, and breaks down in tears. Eventually, at gunpoint, he kills Marcus. Before Vaughn's fiancée arrives, Logan goes over the cover story with Vaughn, instructing him to tell the police only that Marcus drove north and Logan's relatives disappeared.

Months later, Vaughn's fiancée turns on the bedside light to find him awake, sitting in a chair in the dark. She asks if he's okay. He says he's fine, despite clearly being far from it. They hear the baby start to cry. Vaughn gets up and goes to comfort his crying child, staring into the distance with a haunted look.

== Cast ==
- Jack Lowden as Vaughn
- Martin McCann as Marcus
- Tony Curran as Logan McClay
- Ian Pirie as Brian McClay
- Kate Bracken as Iona
- Kitty Lovett as Kara
- Cal MacAninch as Al McClay
- Cameron Jack as Frank McClay
- Donald McLeary as Grant McClay

== Production ==
The film was nine years in the making, and began filming in November 2016.

In May 2018, it was reported that Calibre had been picked up by Netflix for distribution and would first world premiere at the Edinburgh International Film Festival.

== Release ==
Calibre premiered at the Edinburgh International Film Festival on 22 June 2018. Following success at the festival, the film was released worldwide on 29 June 2018 by Netflix. It also had a limited release in select Curzon Cinemas in the UK from 21 October to 16 November 2018.

=== Critical response ===
Calibre has received positive reviews and is critically acclaimed. On review aggregator Rotten Tomatoes, the film holds an approval rating of 100% based on 19 reviews, with an average rating of 7.4/10. Metacritic gives the film a weighted average rating of 76 out of 100, based on 7 critics, indicating "generally favorable reviews".

Guy Lodge of Variety called the film "a sensationally well-executed nerve-mangler", and gave high praise to "the level of craft and confidence on display in all aspects of Calibre, from [Matt] Palmer's clean, lean scripting to Márk Györi's baleful, autumn-chill camerawork to a lead performance of through-the-wringer commitment by rising Scots star Jack Lowden." Neil Young of The Hollywood Reporter noted that "a mature social concern about the plight of remote, economically marginal but tightly knit communities, gives Calibre a pungent, intriguing layer of ambiguity that only sharpens the acute pain of the awful events so skillfully depicted. Both Ken Loach and Wes Craven would surely approve." Catherine Renton of The Edinburgh Reporter concluded a very positive review of the film by claiming "I was exhausted but exhilarated after a taut 100 minutes of drama, and I can't wait to do it all again..."

=== Accolades ===
Award	Date of ceremony	Category	Recipients	Result	Ref.
Edinburgh International Film Festival	22 June 2018	Best British Film	Calibre	Won	
British Academy Scotland Awards	4 November 2018	Best Director (Fiction)	Matt Palmer	Nominated	
British Academy Scotland Awards	4 November 2018	Best Actor in Film	Tony Curran	Nominated	
British Academy Scotland Awards	4 November 2018	Best Actor in Film	Jack Lowden	Won	
British Academy Scotland Awards	4 November 2018	Best Actor in Film	Martin McCann	Nominated	
British Academy Scotland Awards	4 November 2018	Best Writer Film/Television	Matt Palmer	Nominated	

== See also ==
- Betrayal
