= Martin McCann =

Northern Irish actor (born 1983)

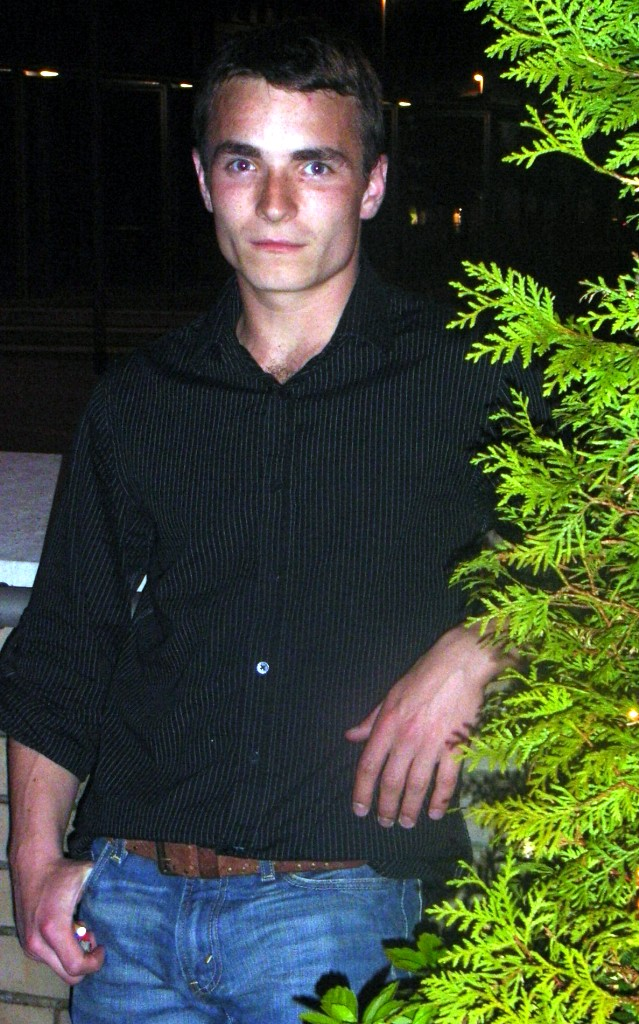
- Main character and star in the Northern Irish police show Blue Lights
- Born: 20 July 1983 (age 43); Belfast, Northern Ireland
- Occupation: Actor

Martin McCann (born 20 July 1983) is an actor from Northern Ireland . In 2020, he was listed as number 48 on The Irish Times list of Ireland's greatest film actors.

== Biography ==
McCann was born to Martin John Paul McCann and Anne (née Docherty) McCann. He grew up with a brother and sister in the working-class Divis Flats area of Falls Road in Belfast. He joined YouthAction NI's Rainbow Factory, a cross-community drama troupe for Catholic and Protestant children, and spent time in the United States as part of a summer exchange programme. His mother found a role for him by checking the local newspapers, and he soon won the stage production part of the Artful Dodger in Oliver Twist. He got lead roles in productions of Bugsy Malone and The Crucible.

Popular in Northern Ireland for various sketches (including the trendy priest) in Dry Your Eyes, he had a feature role in a short film by Simon Fitzmaurice called The Sound of People. He followed this with his feature film debut (as Jimmy Riley) in Closing the Ring (2007), directed by Richard Attenborough. Attenborough cast McCann in the film after seeing him in a stage production of A Clockwork Orange. McCann had a role in the film My Boy Jack (as Guardsman Bowe), about Rudyard Kipling and his son, who was killed in World War I.

McCann played Sergeant R. V. Burgin in the miniseries The Pacific, produced by Steven Spielberg and Tom Hanks, which aired in March 2010. In an interview for Film Ireland, McCann says he auditioned several times for the role in London and twice in Los Angeles. He contacted Lord Attenborough's assistant to send Spielberg samples of his work to increase his chances of getting the role.

In early 2010, he was shooting in Belfast for the music-comedy Killing Bono, a film released in April 2011 about the life of one of Bono's classmates who tries to make it in the music business, only to have his failures and frustrations magnified by the continued rise of U2. McCann played the supporting role of Bono. In 2011, McCann completed a principal role in Terry George's Whole Lotta Sole, He was also cast in Titanic: Blood and Steel, a twelve-part mini-series drama chronicling the building of the Titanic and the story about the ship before it left on its maiden voyage.

In February 2011, McCann won the award for best lead actor in a feature film at the 8th Irish Film & Television Awards for his performance as Occi Byrne in Swansong, produced by Zanzibar Films.

He starred in the Oscar-nominated and BAFTA-winning 2014 short film Boogaloo and Graham, as well as the 2014 short film Magpie, later expanded into the 2015 film The Survivalist in which he starred as 'the Survivalist'. McCann was nominated for the award for best lead actor in a feature film at the 13th Irish Film & Television Awards for his performance in The Survivalist.

In 2016, he voiced Bobby Sands in reenactments in the documentary film Bobby Sands: 66 Days. In 2016, he also appeared in an episode of the BBC series The Fall as Alvarez.

In the 2017 film Maze, depicting the 1983 prison break at HM Prison Maze outside Belfast, McCann played Oscar, one of the imprisoned IRA officers. Also in 2017, actor Woody Harrelson cast Martin McCann in his directorial debut Lost in London. This was the first feature film livestreamed direct to cinemas.

In 2018, he starred in the British thriller Calibre, directed by Matt Palmer. He played Marcus, an Edinburgh businessman who takes his friend on a hunting trip in the Scottish highlands. The film won the Michael Powell award for Best British Film at the 2018 Edinburgh International Film Festival. He was nominated for the award for best actor in film at the 2018 British Academy Scotland Awards for his performance.

In 2020, McCann starred as Bobby Barrett in the third series of Nordic noir detective series Marcella.

In 2023, McCann began starring in the BBC One drama Blue Lights as Stevie Neil, an experienced police officer partnered with a rookie.

In 2025, McCann starred in Netflix miniseries Hostage as John Shagan.

== Other ==
McCann is a patron of the charity YouthAction Northern Ireland, whose Rainbow Factory School of Performing Arts is a youth arts project in which young people take part in a range of workshops and classes. He promotes cultural diversity via the dramatic arts and his character as a man of understanding coming from a “below” class in Northern Ireland in his youth.
