= Couple in a Hole =

2015 film directed by Tom Geens

Couple in a Hole is a 2015 film directed by Tom Geens and starring Kate Dickie and Paul Higgins. The lead actors play a man and woman who live together in the Pyrenees in what could be described as a shallow hole in the ground. Dickie won best actress in a film at the 2016 British Academy Scotland Awards for her performance.

== Production and release ==
It is the second feature film directed by Tom Geens, following Liar (Menteur) in 2009. Geens had been involved with experimental theatre in London in the 1990s, before becoming interested in filmmaking after seeing Thomas Vinterberg's film Festen. Making the film took him five years. Many of the film's creative decisions were influenced by financing, including the Scottish stars and the French setting. He had wanted to set the film somewhere wilder like the forests of Eastern Europe.

The soundtrack is by British band Beak (stylized as BEAK>).

== Plot ==
It focuses on a Scottish couple, Karen (Dickie) and John (Higgins), who are initially shown living in a hole in the mountains, surviving off what they can find. When Karen is bitten by a spider, John heads to a nearby village and gets the help of Andre (Jerome Kircher). This increases tensions between Karen and John, leading to arguments and some information about why they are living in a hole: they are dealing with grief over the death of a child.

== Critical response ==
It received a generally positive reviews. On Rotten Tomatoes the film has an approval rating of 100% based on reviews from 15 critics. Jonathan Romney in the Observer rated it 3 out of 5, praising the acting in particular, and calling it "a ruralist cross between British psychological realism and the wilder, Artaud-inflected fringes of French art cinema". Time Out also gave it 3 out of 5, calling it "strange", and saying how it created a mysterious atmosphere of unease rather than being interested in plot. It also featured in The Guardian's top 50 films of 2016 (its UK release date).

Dennis Harvey of Variety found it "exasperating and random", concluding that commercial prospects were "remote".
