= 2016 British Academy Scotland Awards =

26th edition of BAFTA Scotland ceremony

- Date: 6 November 2016
- Site: Radisson Blu Hotel, Glasgow, Scotland
- Hosted by: Edith Bowman

Television coverage
- Network: Streaming webcast

The 26th British Academy Scotland Awards were held on 6 November 2016 at the Radisson Blu Hotel in Glasgow, honouring the best Scottish film and television productions of 2016. Presented by BAFTA Scotland, accolades were handed out for the best in feature-length film that were screened at British cinemas during 2016. The nominees were announced on 6 October 2016. The ceremony was hosted by Edith Bowman.

== Winners and nominees ==
Winners are listed first and highlighted in boldface.

Best Feature Film	Best Director Film/Television
**Tommy's Honour**; Moon Dogs; Sunset Song	**Douglas MacKinnon** - **Sherlock The Abominable Bride**; Michael Keillor - Line of Duty; Jan Matthys - Shetland
Best Actor in Film	Best Actress in Film
**Peter Mullan** - **Hector**; Brian Cox - The Carer; Jack Lowden - Tommy's Honour	**Kate Dickie** - **Couple in a Hole**; Ruth Negga - Iona; Alison Peebles - Where Do We Go from Here?
Best Television Drama	Best Specialist Factual
**Shetland**; Not Safe For Work; Outlander	**Imagine: Richard Flanagan: Life After Death**; Ted Hughes: Stronger Than Death; The Truth About Dementia
Best Actor in Television	Best Actress in Television
**Douglas Henshall** - **Shetland**; Peter Capaldi - Doctor Who; Sam Heughan - Outlander	**Caitriona Balfe** - **Outlander**; Ashley Jensen - Catastrophe; Annie Wallace - Hollyoaks
Best Writer Film/Television	Best Comedy/Entertainment Programme
**DC Moore** - **Not Safe For Work**; Gaby Chiappe - Shetland; Jonathan Wilson & Ciara Conway - River City	**Mrs. Brown's Boys: Christmas Special 2015**; Scot Squad; Two Doors Down
Best Factual Series	Best Features/ Factual Entertainment Programme
**This Farming Life**; Into The Wild With Gordon Buchanan; Scotland's Home Movies: Memories On Film	**Supershoppers**; Antiques Road Trip; Gary: Tank Commander, Election Special
Best Single Documentary	Best Short Film
**Dunblane: Our Story**; The Islands and the Whales; Seven Songs For A Long Life	**Isabella**; Swan; Take Your Partners
Best Current Affairs	Best Children's Programme
**BBC Scotland Investigates: Britain's Puppy Dealers Exposed**; BBC Scotland Investigates: Rugby And The Brain - Tackling The Truth; Eòrpa	**All Over The Workplace**; Down On The Farm; Lifebabble
Best Game	Best Animation
**Glitchspace**; Binaries; Killbox	**No Place Like Home**; American Dream; The Testament of Gideon Mack
Outstanding Contribution to Film	Outstanding Contribution to Craft
**Sixteen Films, Ken Loach, Rebecca O'Brien, Paul Laverty**	**Christine Cant**

== See also ==
- 69th British Academy Film Awards
- 88th Academy Awards
- 22nd Screen Actors Guild Awards
