= David Paisley =

Scottish actor

- Born: David Paisley; 2 February 1979 (age 47); Falkirk, Scotland
- Occupations: Actor, singer
- Years active: 2000–present
- Mother: Janet Paisley

David Paisley (born 2 February 1979) is a Scottish actor, domestic violence and LGBTQIA+ rights campaigner, known for roles as midwife Ben Saunders in Holby City, Ryan Taylor in Tinsel Town and Rory Murdoch in River City. Some of his characters have been controversial due to their sexual orientation.

== Early life ==
Paisley is the son of author Janet Paisley, and is one of seven children. He was voted 'Britain's sexiest man' by readers of Gay Times magazine in 2003. He grew up in Glen Village near Falkirk. At 15 years of age, Paisley went to an LGBT group where he eventually met his first partner. At 17, he attended the University of Glasgow to study physics, during which time he appeared in a community workshop (part of 7:84 theatre company in Glasgow) and then studied Optometry at Glasgow Caledonian University. At 18, he came out to his family who were supportive and helped in his efforts campaigning against the Keep the Clause campaign.

== Career ==
Paisley began acting as a teenage boy when he heard about an open audition for television drama Tinsel Town, a 1999-2000 television drama (co-produced by BBC Scotland and Raindog/Deep Indigo Productions). He went on to play one of the main characters, Ryan Taylor, the 17-year-old partner of a police officer.

Later, Paisley appeared in a few stage productions. Then in 2002, he landed the part of midwife Ben Saunders in BBC1's popular medical soap Holby City. Ben's kiss with his on-screen same-sex partner attracted 114 complaints from viewers.

In 2008, Paisley starred in the short film Sweat, which was screened at the London Lesbian and Gay Film Festival, and selected for screening at NewFest in New York, June 2008.

Paisley completed filming on his regular role as Rory Murdoch on BBC Scotland's River City, the son of gangster Lenny Murdoch and departed the show in 2009.

Paisley starred as 'Madam' Gary in the play The Backroom by Adrian Pagan at The Cock Tavern Theatre in Kilburn, London in March–May 2009, where he provided a 'particularly credible' performance as his 'nervy and paranoid' character.

In May 2009, he also starred as Michael in the successful stage production of Muhmah at the HighTide Festival. In 2009–10, he took to the stage again in the UK Tour of Over The Rainbow: The Eva Cassidy Story, in which he played the part of Dan Cassidy.

In 2010, he made his directorial debut with the play The Lasses, O (written by his mother Janet Paisley). at the Edinburgh Festival. He also starred as Rick in the 2010 horror film Unhappy Birthday.

In 2013, Paisley "starred" in a short film produced for the Dutch Film Festival called Fall-out, described as a post-apocalyptic romantic comedy.

In 2016, he played the role of Saki in Katherine Rundell's Life According to Saki at the Edinburgh Festival Fringe; the play went on to win the Carol Tambor Best of Edinburgh Award and subsequently toured Off-off-Broadway.

In November 2019, he returned to River City as Rory Murdoch, back from the dead having faked his own suicide.

== Filmography ==
Year	Title	Role	Notes
2000	Tinsel Town	Ryan Taylor	TV series (2 seasons)
2002	As If	Glen	TV series (1 episodes)
2002–03	Holby City	Ben Saunders	TV series (2 seasons)
2003	Casualty	Ben Saunders	TV series (6 episodes)
2006–09, 2019–2021	River City	Rory Murdoch	TV series (4 seasons)
2007	The Whistleblowers	Paul McCallister	TV series (1 episodes)
2008	Sweat	Simon	Short film
2010	Unhappybirthday	Rick	Film
2013	Fall-out	Nate	Short film
2016	EastEnders	Tom Edwards	TV series (2 episodes)
2018	Rise of the Clans	Robert the Bruce	TV series (1 episode "The Bruce Supremacy")

== Awards and nominations ==
Year	Award	Category	Nominee(s)	Result	Ref.
2016	Carol Tambor Best of Edinburgh Award	Best of Edinburgh	Life According to Saki	Won	

== Personal life ==
Paisley is a vegetarian. He was voted 'Britain's sexiest man' by readers of Gay Times magazine in 2003. In 2021, SNP MP Joanna Cherry alleged he had defamed her on Twitter, though he denied this and Cherry did not take the matter to court.

In March 2021, Paisley was nominated for "Awesome" Ally of the Year by Diva magazine. In May 2021, Paisley was nominated for '"Celebrity" of the Year' at the National Diversity Awards. In June 2021, he was announced as a winner of the Attitude Pride Awards 2021. In August 2021, he was shortlisted for the "Community Champion Award" at the Proud Scotland awards.

Paisley declared in August 2021 that he would move from Scotland as he "no longer feels safe" after being doxed.
