= Small Island (play) =

2019 play by Helen Edmundson

- Original language: English
- Written by: Helen Edmundson (play); Andrea Levy (novel)
- Based on: Small Island by Andrea Levy

Premiere
- Date: 17 April 2019
- Place: Olivier Theatre, National Theatre, London

Small Island is a 2019 play by Helen Edmundson based on the 2004 novel of the same name by Andrea Levy. It tells the deeply connected stories of three people against the backdrop of the complex history of the United Kingdom and Jamaica. It premiered at the National Theatre in 2019 to critical acclaim.

== Synopsis ==
Hortense yearns for a new life away from rural Jamaica, Gilbert dreams of becoming a lawyer, and Queenie longs to escape her Lincolnshire roots. In these three intimately connected stories, hope and humanity meet stubborn reality, tracing the tangled history of Jamaica and Britain.

== Productions ==
Small Island premiered in the Olivier Theatre at the National Theatre, London in 2019. Previews began on 17 April, with an official opening on 1 May, and the production ran until 10 August. The production was directed by Rufus Norris. As well as selling out its run at the National Theatre, it was broadcast to cinemas as part of National Theatre Live on 30 May 2019. Andrea Levy, who wrote the novel on which the play is based, died in February 2019, just a few months before the play premiered. The playwright, Helen Edmundson, called working with Levy 'a joy and a privilege', saying:

Like her books, she was uncompromising and funny, wise and honest. There was nothing I couldn’t ask her, and always something we could laugh about. Although we sometimes fantasised about miracles, we knew it was very unlikely that she would ever see the play. Her support for the script I arrived at meant everything. I once told her that adapting Small Island was as complex and important as adapting War and Peace. She loved that. She was, and is, one of the greats.

Following the success of the 2019 run, the production was scheduled to return to the Olivier Theatre from in October 2020, however has since been cancelled due to the COVID-19 pandemic. The NT Live recording was streamed on YouTube as part of the National Theatre at Home programme from 18 to 25 June 2020.

A new production directed by Matthew Xia will open in spring 2026 part of a co-production with Leeds Playhouse, Birmingham Repertory Theatre and Nottingham Playhouse in association with Actors Touring Company.

== Critical reception ==
Small Island received critical acclaim. Michael Billington of The Guardian praised Edmundson's 'remarkable adaptation' and the play's 'willingness to confront racism', giving it five stars and calling it one of the top two theatre shows of 2019 and 'one of the most important' plays of the year. Kate Kellaway of The Observer gave the play five stars, praising Edmundson's 'virtuoso' adaptation. Claire Allfree of the Metro also gave the play five stars, praising it as 'accessible and excellent'. Ann Treneman of The Times gave the production four stars, praising the 'immediacy' of the adaptation. Matt Wolf of The New York Times and The Arts Desk described the production as the 'complete theatrical experience', and praised the play as 'Sweeping when needed but also touchingly intimate'. Andrzej Lukowski of Time Out gave the production four stars, praising Edmundson's 'supreme work'. Sarah Crompton of What's On Stage gave the 'all-encompassing and absorbing production' four stars. Marianka Swain of BroadwayWorld gave the production four stars, praising Edmundson's 'fleet-footed' adaptation. Mark Shenton of The London Theatre Guide gave the production four stars, writing that it was 'big, bold, poignant and powerful storytelling theatre. It has a grand epic sweep but also a surprising intimacy on the vast Olivier stage that made a vocal, refreshingly diverse audience really respond to it'.
