= Kindred (film) =

- Film poster
- Directed by: Joe Marcantonio
- Written by: Joe Marcantonio; Jason McColgan
- Produced by: Dominic Norris; Jack Lowden
- Starring: Tamara Lawrance; Jack Lowden; Fiona Shaw
- Cinematography: Carlos Catalán
- Edited by: Fiona Desouza
- Music by: Natalie Holt; Jack Halama
- Distributed by: Sky Cinema
- Release date: 21 October 2020 (Montclair Film Festival)
- Running time: 101 minutes
- Country: United Kingdom
- Language: English
- Box office: $8,921

Kindred is a 2020 British mystery horror drama film written and directed by Joe Marcantonio and starring Tamara Lawrance, Jack Lowden and Fiona Shaw. The film premiered at the 2021 Montclair Film Festival at a drive-in screening.

== Premise ==
Upon receiving news that her boyfriend Ben has suddenly died in an accident, mother-to-be Charlotte collapses. She wakes in Ben's parents' home, an old manor. Ben's mother Margaret and his stepbrother Thomas are determined to take care of her until the baby arrives. Plagued by hallucinations caused by pregnancy, as well as knowing that her boyfriend isn't coming back, Charlotte accepts their help. But as time passes and her visions intensify, Charlotte starts to suspect that the family's intentions aren't as good as they seem.

== Cast ==
- Tamara Lawrance as Charlotte Wilde
- Fiona Shaw as Margaret
- Jack Lowden as Thomas
- Edward Holcroft as Ben
- Chloe Pirrie as Jane
- Anton Lesser as Dr. Richards
- Natalia Kostrzewa as Betty
- Kiran Sonia Sawar as Linsey
- Nyree Yergainharsian as Dr. Rios
- Michael Nardone as George
- Toyah Frantzen as A&B doctor
- Jason Otesanya as baby Benjamin
- Elliot Conroy as baby in the waiting room
- Terry Byrne as priest
- Adrian Cosby as funeral guest

== Release ==
The film was released in select theatres and on VOD and digital platforms in the United States on 6 November 2020.

== Reception ==
The film has a 69% rating on Rotten Tomatoes. The site's consensus reads, "Kindred's naturalistic approach may frustrate viewers seeking jump scares, but this psychologically driven horror story casts its own grim spell." Kate Erbland of IndieWire graded the film a B.

Owen Gleiberman of Variety gave the film a positive review and wrote that "Kindred is a demonstration of how a naturalistic horror film can be derivative, in the most flagrant and shameless way, and still work."

David Rooney of The Hollywood Reporter also gave the film a positive review and wrote "Marcantonio shows confidence and maturity in his choices. There are no cheap jump scares or shocks, just a queasy feeling that gets under the skin and remains there in a film notable for its sustained mood."
