= Tommy's Honour =

- Film poster
- Directed by: Jason Connery
- Screenplay by: Pamela Marin; Kevin Cook
- Based on: Tommy's Honor: The Story of Old Tom Morris and Young Tom Morris, Golf's Founding Father and Son by Kevin Cook
- Produced by: Keith Bank; Bob Last; Jim Kreutzer; Tim Moore
- Starring: Peter Mullan; Jack Lowden; Ophelia Lovibond; Sam Neill
- Music by: Christian Henson
- Production companies: Gutta Percha Productions; Timeless Films; Creative Scotland; SellOutPictures; Wind Chill Media Group
- Distributed by: Roadside Attractions (United States); Thunderbird Releasing (United Kingdom); Timeless Films (International)
- Release dates: June 15, 2016 (Edinburgh International Film Festival); April 14, 2017 (United States); July 7, 2017 (United Kingdom)
- Running time: 117 minutes
- Countries: United States; United Kingdom
- Language: English

Tommy's Honour is a 2016 historical drama film depicting the lives and careers of, and the complex relationship between, the pioneering Scottish golfing champions Old Tom Morris and his son Young Tom Morris. The film is directed by Jason Connery, and the father and son are portrayed by Peter Mullan and Jack Lowden. The film won Best Feature Film at the 2016 British Academy Scotland Awards.

The screenplay, written by Pamela Marin and Kevin Cook, is based on Cook's 2007 book, Tommy's Honor: The Story of Old Tom Morris and Young Tom Morris, Golf's Founding Father and Son. The book won the Herbert Warren Wind Book Award as the best golf book of 2007, was one of the five books that Sports Illustrated selected as the "Books of the Year" in 2007, and was #32 of "the 50 best sports books ever written" selected by The Telegraph.

The film opened the 2016 Edinburgh International Film Festival on 15 June 2016 and it went into theatrical release in the United States on 14 April 2017 and in the United Kingdom on 7 July 2017. The official premiere was held at The New Picture House St Andrews

== Plot ==
In St Andrews, Scotland in 1866, 15-year-old Tommy Morris (Jack Lowden) is an avid golfer like his legendary and pioneering father, Tom Morris (Peter Mullan). "Old Tom" is greens-keeper for The Royal and Ancient Golf Club of St Andrews, as well as the town's club- and ball-maker. He is the two-time winner of the first major golf tournament, The Open Championship, which was founded in 1860 by James Ogilvie Fairlie, Tom's mentor. He also established golf's standard of 18 holes per round. But young Tommy is beginning to chafe at his father's dictates, especially in the rapidly changing world they live in.

Tommy soon outshines his father, winning The Open three times in a row while still in his teens. The "dashing young man of golf", he draws flocks of spectators to the sport and becomes its first touring professional.

Father and son repeatedly clash over the unwritten rules of social class, and this culminates when Tommy marries his sweetheart Meg (Ophelia Lovibond), a woman of lower standing with a shameful secret in her past. As the story concludes, Old Tom makes a fatal misjudgement that strips Tommy of everything he holds dear. Following the results of that fateful choice, Old Tom takes on a personal mission that carries him through the final decades of his life: that of honouring his son Tommy.

== Main cast ==
- Peter Mullan as Old Tom Morris, a pioneering and legendary golfing champion
- Jack Lowden as Tommy Morris, Old Tom's son and an expert golfer in his own right
- Ophelia Lovibond as Meg Drinnen, the woman Tommy loves
- Sam Neill as Alexander Boothby, the Captain of The Royal and Ancient Golf Club of St Andrews

== Production ==
In 2010 producer Jim Kreutzer happened to read Kevin Cook's Herbert Warren Wind Book Award–winning 2007 book Tommy's Honor: The Story of Old Tom Morris and Young Tom Morris, Golf's Founding Father and Son, and immediately obtained the film rights for it. The project remained in development for several years, while Kreutzer did further research and interviewed people in Scotland who knew the story well. The author Cook's wife Pamela Marin, an accomplished journalist and memoirist, adapted the book into a screenplay along with Cook.

In January 2014 Jason Connery, son of Sean Connery, was announced as the film's director. He stated:

I am so incredibly passionate and excited to tell this story. It is a story that is truly close to my heart as I grew up with my father on a golf course, and I have a home an hour from St. Andrews. This is an extraordinary and intimate tale of love and family at the beginning of the great game of golf. This story has to be told!

Connery also noted that his father, a serious golfer in addition to being a renowned actor, gave him ideas and insight about making the film.

Kreutzer, along with venture capitalist Keith Bank, established Gutta Percha Productions for the sole purpose of financing and producing Tommy's Honour. The film's additional producers are Bob Last, Tim Moore, and Kenneth C. Whitney. In June 2015 the production received a £400,000 grant from National Lottery Funding through Creative Scotland's Screen Production Fund.

The two lead actors, Peter Mullan and Jack Lowden, were cast in July 2015. Neither had prior experience with golf, although Lowden had done several leading roles as an athlete or soldier, in Black Watch, Chariots of Fire, and The Passing Bells.

Filming began in mid-August 2015, and was completed in late September 2015. All filming took place on location in Scotland, in over 50 locations including in St Andrews and surrounding areas, Edinburgh and Musselburgh, and towns such as Peebles and Falkland. The shoot lasted six weeks, but there was rain on only one day, which is unusual for Scotland.

== Release ==
Tommy's Honour was selected to open the 2016 Edinburgh International Film Festival on 15 June 2016, which was the film's premiere. At the festival it was also nominated for the Michael Powell Award for Best British Feature Film. It continued screening at the festival through 26 June. The film also screened at London Screenings at BFI Southbank, an international film-marketing conference for British films which lasted from 20 to 23 June 2016. Sean Connery, who was unable to attend the EIFF debut of his son's film, screened Tommy's Honour in a cinema near his home in the Bahamas in July 2016.

The film showed at the Dinard British Film Festival in Dinard, France from 28 September to 2 October 2016. It screened at the Haifa International Film Festival in mid-October 2016, and at the BBC First British Film Festival 2016 in Australia, which began in late October 2016.

Roadside Attractions acquired the U.S. rights to Tommy's Honour in September 2016. It opened nationwide in the U.S. on 14 April 2017. It was released internationally in the spring of 2017, and international sales of the film are handled by Timeless Films. The film was released via streaming video and DVD in June and July 2017 in the U.S.

== Reception ==
Initial reviews immediately following the film's debut at the Edinburgh International Film Festival were generally positive. The performances of the two leads, Mullan and Lowden, were widely praised. A few reviewers felt that the film may have tried to do too much due to having several themes, and a few felt that some of the golfing sequences were repetitive.

Review aggregator Rotten Tomatoes gives the film a 67% approval rating based on 83 reviews, with an average rating of 5.7/10. According to Metacritic, which sampled 22 critics and calculated a weighted average score of 56 out of 100, the film received "mixed or average reviews".

Screen Daily, while acknowledging the film's central father-son drama, also noted the portrayal of the class conflicts of 19th-century golf – played by the lower classes, attended by unruly crowds, and owned and bet on by aristocrats who controlled and profited from the sport. The review also opined that "As the principals play across the film's varied locations, in all weather, viewers get a true sense of golf's real grit, a more essential and raw essence of the sport than is achieved in most coverage today."

Kate Muir in The Times concluded that the film is "fairly conventional, and your pleasure in it will probably be predicated on your love for the game." Conversely, Ross Miller in The National called the film "emotional, inspiring and deeply heartfelt" and wrote "You don’t have to be a golf fan to be taken in by this engrossing, quietly passionate film that not only brings something new to the sports biopic table but also serves as a poignant, often heartbreaking portrait of paternal love and pursuing your passion with everything you have." In January 2017, Justin Lowe in The Hollywood Reporter said the film "offers an engrossing and accessible celebration of the game’s modern origins, enhanced by striking locations and a standout cast."

In November 2016 Tommy's Honour won Best Feature Film at the 2016 British Academy Scotland Awards (BAFTA Scotland Awards). Jack Lowden was nominated for Best Film Actor for his performance as Tommy Morris.

== Awards ==
Year	Award	Category	Recipient	Result
2016	Edinburgh International Film Festival	Michael Powell Award for Best British Feature Film	Tommy's Honour	Nominated
2016	2016 British Academy Scotland Awards	Best Feature Film	Tommy's Honour	Won
2016	2016 British Academy Scotland Awards	Best Film Actor	Jack Lowden	Nominated
