= Rogue Trooper (film) =

Animated film by Duncan Jones

- Official logo
- Directed by: Duncan Jones
- Written by: Duncan Jones
- Based on: Rogue Trooper by: Gerry Finley-Day; Dave Gibbons
- Produced by: Stuart Fenegan; Jason Kingsley; Duncan Jones; Chris Kingsley; Ben Smith; Ben Andac
- Starring: Aneurin Barnard; Hayley Atwell; Sean Bean; Matt Berry; Asa Butterfield; Jemaine Clement; Jack Lowden; Alice Lowe; Daryl McCormack; Diane Morgan; Reece Shearsmith; Peter Serafinowicz
- Cinematography: Dan Atherton
- Edited by: Barrett Heathcote
- Music by: Bear McCreary
- Production companies: Rebellion Developments; Liberty Films
- Release date: 22 June 2026 (Annecy)
- Running time: 125 minutes
- Country: United Kingdom
- Language: English

Rogue Trooper is a 2026 British adult animated military science fiction film produced, written, and directed by Duncan Jones. Based on the 2000 AD comic strip character Rogue Trooper created by Gerry Finley-Day and Dave Gibbons, the film stars Aneurin Barnard as the titular character, with Hayley Atwell, Jack Lowden, Daryl McCormack, Reece Shearsmith, Matt Berry, Asa Butterfield, Jemaine Clement and Sean Bean in supporting roles.

== Premise ==
"Rogue Trooper tells the story of 19, a 'Genetic Infantryman,' who finds himself the sole-survivor of an invasion force. Desperate to track down the traitor who sold him and his comrades out, the super soldier is accompanied by three killed-in-action squad mates, whose personalities have been stored in his gun, helmet and rucksack."

== Voice cast ==
- Aneurin Barnard as 19 / Rogue Trooper
- Hayley Atwell as Venus Bluegenes
- Sean Bean as Colonel Dicey
- Matt Berry as Mr Bland
- Asa Butterfield
- Jemaine Clement as Mr Brass
- Jack Lowden as Gunnar
- Alice Lowe
- Daryl McCormack as Helm
- Diane Morgan as Colonel Logan
- Reece Shearsmith as Bagman
- Peter Serafinowicz
- Adrian Edmondson
- Henning Wehn
- Al Murray

== Production ==
In 2011, Grant Morrison intended to write a film adaptation of the 2000 AD comic strip Rogue Trooper, but the project never came to fruition due to disappointing box office takings of Dredd (2012), which was also based on a 2000 AD comic. In July 2018, Duncan Jones revealed that his next project would be a Rogue Trooper adaptation.

Jones and producer Stuart Fenegan had pursued a Rogue Trooper adaptation for several years before convincing Rebellion Developments to allow them to produce the film. To help establish the project's creative direction during early development, Jones recorded a complete audio dramatisation of the screenplay, voicing every character himself, which later served as the basis for the film's initial animatic. The film's visual style was developed through an iterative process using storyboards, live-action reference footage, Unreal Engine animatics and concept art, with the filmmakers seeking to evoke the appearance of the original 2000 AD artwork, particularly the War Machine special, through a watercolor-inspired aesthetic. Although motion capture was used for some stunt sequences, the animation was extensively refined by hand to avoid a video game-like appearance.

In January 2024, Aneurin Barnard, Hayley Atwell, Jack Lowden, Daryl McCormack, Reece Shearsmith, Jemaine Clement, Matt Berry, Diane Morgan, Alice Lowe, Asa Butterfield and Sean Bean had joined the cast of the film. Jones was confirmed as director, writer and producer, and the film would be animated by Treehouse Digital using Epic Games' Unreal Engine 5 tool. The film was produced by Rebellion Developments and Liberty Films, with principal photography having been completed at Rebellion Film Studios in the United Kingdom. Jones said he intentionally cast predominantly British and European actors to reflect the comic's British origins. Minor writing contributions were performed by C. Robert Cargill.

== Release ==
Rogue Trooper Q&A at Midnight Madness. Duncan Jones second from left.

Rogue Trooper was scheduled to be released in cinemas in 2025, but was delayed to an unknown date. First-look images of the film were unveiled in June 2025. The film premiered at the Annecy International Animation Film Festival on 22 June 2026.

It had its North American premiere in the Midnight Madness program at the 2026 Toronto International Film Festival on 19 September.

The film had its UK premiere at the BFI London Film Festival on Friday 9 October 2026.
