= Benediction (film) =

2021 biographical drama film

- Theatrical release poster
- Directed by: Terence Davies
- Written by: Terence Davies
- Produced by: Michael Elliott
- Starring: Jack Lowden; Peter Capaldi; Simon Russell Beale; Jeremy Irvine; Kate Phillips; Gemma Jones; Ben Daniels
- Cinematography: Nicola Daley
- Edited by: Alex Mackie
- Production company: Reiver Pictures
- Distributed by: Vertigo Releasing (United Kingdom); Roadside Attractions (North America)
- Release dates: 12 September 2021 (TIFF); 20 May 2022 (United Kingdom); 3 June 2022 (United States)
- Running time: 137 minutes
- Countries: United Kingdom; United States
- Budget: £5 million
- Box office: $848,834

Benediction is a 2021 biographical romantic drama film written and directed by Terence Davies. It stars Jack Lowden and Peter Capaldi as the war poet Siegfried Sassoon, along with Simon Russell Beale, Jeremy Irvine, Kate Phillips, Gemma Jones, and Ben Daniels.

The film was released in United Kingdom on 20 May 2022 by Vertigo Releasing and United States on 3 June 2022 by Roadside Attractions.

== Synopsis ==
The film follows the life of Siegfried Sassoon, a British poet and decorated World War I combat veteran who was sent to a psychiatric facility for his anti-war stance. He had love affairs with several men during the 1920s, married, had a son, and converted to Catholicism.

== Cast ==
- Jack Lowden as Siegfried Sassoon
  - Peter Capaldi as older Siegfried Sassoon
- Simon Russell Beale as Robbie Ross
- Jeremy Irvine as Ivor Novello
- Kate Phillips as Hester Gatty
  - Gemma Jones as older Hester Gatty
- Ben Daniels as Dr Rivers
- Calam Lynch as Stephen Tennant
  - Anton Lesser as older Stephen Tennant
- Tom Blyth as Glen Byam Shaw
- Matthew Tennyson as Wilfred Owen
- Geraldine James as Theresa Thornycroft
- Richard Goulding as George Sassoon
- Lia Williams as Edith Sitwell
- Suzanne Bertish as Lady Ottoline Morrell
- David Shields as Alexander Fenton
- Julian Sands as Chief Medical Officer
- Jude Akuwudike as Priest
- Giovanna Ria as Nurse

== Production ==
In January 2020, Jack Lowden joined the cast of the film, with Terence Davies directing from a screenplay he had written. In March 2020, Peter Capaldi joined the cast of the film. Principal photography began on 8 September 2020, and finished on 22 October 2020. Benediction was Davies's final film before his death in October 2023.

== Release ==
Benediction had its world premiere as a Special Presentation at the 2021 Toronto International Film Festival on 12 September. That same month, the film's UK and Ireland distribution rights were acquired by Vertigo Films. In October 2021, Roadside Attractions acquired North American distribution rights to the film. It was released in the United Kingdom on 20 May 2022 and in the United States on 3 June 2022.

== Reception ==
On the review aggregator website Rotten Tomatoes, Benediction has an approval rating of 93% based on 149 reviews, with an average rating of 7.7/10. The site's consensus reads, "It isn't an easy watch, but Benediction uncovers a profoundly affecting drama in the real-life story of a combat veteran whose poetry warned against the horrors of war." Metacritic, which uses a weighted average, assigned the film a score of 81 out of 100 based on 32 critic reviews, indicating "universal acclaim". The IndieWire Critics Poll of 165 critics named it the 13th best film released in 2022.

In June 2025, IndieWire ranked the film at number 50 on its list of "The 100 Best Movies of the 2020s (So Far)."

In response to the film's portrayal of Sassoon's conversion to Catholicism, the poet's niece, Sister Jessica Gatty, R.A., (who attributes her own conversion to Sassoon's influence), made a public statement to clarify that her uncle had been both at peace and joyful in his later years. She wrote: "The redemption which he sought in many different ways and which he longed for, was found in the last decade of his life when he came home to Christ in the Catholic Church. He was transformed. I can witness to this, so I need to speak out."

== See also ==
- Regeneration (novel) – 1991 historical novel by Pat Barker
