= Tinsel Town (TV series) =

British television drama series

- Genre: Drama
- Created by: Stuart Davids, Robbie Allen, Martin McCardie
- Developed by: Raindog
- Starring: Dawn Steele; David Paisley; Kate Dickie; Stevie Allen
- Opening theme: "Tinseltown in the Rain (Remix)" by The Blue Nile
- Country of origin: United Kingdom
- Original language: English
- No. of seasons: 2
- No. of episodes: 20

Production
- Executive producers: Barbara McKissack; Scott Meek
- Producer: Robbie Allan
- Production locations: Glasgow, Scotland
- Running time: approx. 42 minutes

Original release
- Network: BBC Two Scotland
- Release: 7 August 2000 – 10 December 2001

Tinsel Town is a Scottish television drama, co-produced by BBC Scotland and Raindog/Deep Indigo Productions. It ran for two series, the first debuting on BBC Two in 2000, with the second series airing on BBC Choice the following year. Developed by Raindog, the series was created by Robbie Allen, Stuart Davids and Martin McCardie. Set throughout the city of Glasgow, Scotland - it deals with the lifestyles of eight main characters who each have the titular Tinsel Town nightclub in common.

== Development ==
Tinsel Town was developed by Raindog with a core cast of actors, beginning in the later 90's. Core original actors included; Dawn Steele, Mandy Matthews, Paul Thomas Hickey and Kate Dickie. A non-broadcast pilot was then shot in Glasgow, which led to the show eventually being commissioned by the BBC.

It was produced and broadcast in the wake of 1999's controversial TV drama Queer as Folk, and promoted as a "Scottish version" of that series, Tinsel Town was defined by its broadcaster as "a cutting-edge saga of life and love in Glasgow's vibrant club land".

In Series One, six episodes were written by co-creator Martin McCardie, two by Ed McCardie and two by Dublin playwright, Jimmy Murphy. Robbie Allen produced all ten episodes, and Series One directors included co-creator Stuart Davids, alongside Caroline Paterson and David McKay.

In Series Two, all ten episodes were written by Martin McCardie, and the running times were reduced to 30 minutes. Additionally, the Tinsel Town name had extended to feature a clothing retail store in addition to the nightclub.

== Characters & Plot ==
=== Series One ===
The characters include Stevie Allen as 37-year-old policeman Lewis Reid, and David Paisley as his 17-year-old boyfriend Ryan Taylor. A controversial LGBT storyline at the time due to the age gap between the pair.

Ryan's sister, party girl Sandra Taylor (Mandy Matthews) is also a central character alongside her friendship with Jack Donnelly (Paul Thomas Hickey) who provide humour and balance to the cast.

Other central cast members are Dawn Steele as gangsters moll Teresa, as well as Steven Duffy and Stuart Sinclair Blythe as best mates Brady and Coutts, respectively. Kate Dickie also stars as Lex, Tinsel Town's hottest new DJ. And Jim Twaddale stars as Stella, the trans owner of Tinsel Town. Frank Gallagher stars as gangster Darren Hope, and Barbara Rafferty stars as Jack's alcoholic mother Jacqueline.

In Series One, Brady embarks on a sordid affair with best mate Coutts's girlfriend Teresa, resulting in the end of series cliffhanger. New club DJ Lex is introduced at the start of the series and we see her battling to escape her sadistic and abusive ex-husband with the help of the club owner, Stella.

=== Series Two ===
Series Two saw all main characters from Series One returned, with the exception of Brady and Coutts, who were central to the plot and cliffhanger of Series One, so this changed the emphasis of the second series. There were a few additional characters added, who all worked in the new Tinsel Town nightclub location and its adjoining clothing store.

In Series Two, Ryan (David Paisley) is now at university in Glasgow and on a break from his relationship with Lewis (Stevie Allen) - the series focusses on the "will they, won't they" get back together. Sandra (Mandy Matthews) and Jack (Paul Thomas Hickey) are in a relationship and living in a flat share with Ryan. Teresa finds herself without the finances and protection that Coutts provided, and so she needed to rebuild her life from scratch, joining the staff at Tinsel Town. Dan Jackson returns as the hapless Ian, who tries to find purpose in life away from his parents money. And Lex (Kate Dickie) returns from travelling to try to save a spiralling Stella (Jim Twaddale) and his failing businesses.

=== Cast ===
- Mandy Matthews - Sandra
- Paul Thomas Hickey - Jack
- David Paisley - Ryan
- Stevie Allen - Lewis
- Stephen Duffy - Brady
- Stuart Sinclair Blyth - Coutts
- Dawn Steele - Teresa
- Kate Dickie - Lex
- Jim Twaddale - Stella
- Seamus Gubbins - Michael
- Brian McCardie - Robert
- Patricia Ross - Marie
- Laurie Ventry - Frank
- Barbara Rafferty - Jacqueline
- Daniel Jackson - Ian
- Andrew Flannagan - Connor
- Maureen Carr - Kathy
- Paul Samson - Colin
- Joanna Macleod - Susan
- Ronnie Simon - Cameron
- Chris McQuarry - Robin
- Kate Donnelly - May
- Erin McCardie - Pauline
- Jason Kavanagh - Tommy
- Sharlene Whyte - Diane
- Vanya Eadie - Sarah
- Marc Oliver - Ash

=== Series Re-Runs ===
The series aired again on BBC Choice in 2001 and then BBC Two in 2002. Series One was released in the UK on VHS, but neither series has been repeated by the BBC since.

The rights to both series were then acquired by dance channel Rapture TV, who are at least theoretically Scottish-owned, and began airing in May 2006. This is one of the first times that a BBC series has been sold to a free-to-air broadcaster, or been shown FTA other than on the BBC itself.

== Soundtrack ==
The Tinsel Town soundtrack was released in 2000 on a 2 x CD by BBC Music and features music by artists including; Basement Jaxx, Fatboy Slim, Chemical Brothers, Moloko and Primal Scream. As well as the main title song 'Tinsel Town' by Blue Nile.

The shows effective "theme song" is "Out of Control" by the Chemical Brothers and Bernard Sumner, which plays through the majority of in-club sequences as well as other times in the show.

However, the actual opening and closing theme is a remix of "Tinseltown in the Rain" by Scottish band The Blue Nile which was specially produced by them for the TV show.

=== Tinsel Town - 2 x CD Tracklist ===
CD 1

1. Fatboy Slim - Love Island
2. Basement Jaxx - Jump 'N' Shout
3. Chemical Brothers - Chemical Beats
4. Armand Van Helden - Rock Da Spot
5. Underworld - Push Upstairs
6. Propellerheads - Bang On!
7. Primal Scream - Swastika Eyes (Chemical Brothers Mix)
8. Leftfield/Bambaataa - Afrika Shox
9. Renegade Soundwave - Renegade Soundwave (Leftfield Remix)
10. Lemon Interupt - Bigmouth
11. Death In Vegas - Dirge (Slam Remix)
12. Moloko - Pure Pleasure Seeker
13. Dusty Springfield - The Look of Love
14. David Bowie - Oh You Pretty Thing
15. Blue Nile - Tinsel Town
16. Manic Street Preachers - The Everlasting
17. Slam Vs Unkle - Narcotourists

CD 2

1. Soul Centre - Walk With Me
2. Bayaka - Salia (2AM Mix)
3. Markus Nikolai - Passion
4. Matthias Heilbronn - Arriba Abajo
5. Autonomous Soul - Vaguely Drifting
6. Death In Vegas - Blood Yawning
7. Mr Velcro Fastener - Who's Gonna Bend
8. Mr Velcro Fastener - Paradise Valley
9. Chromatic - DMX Beats
10. Adult. - Hand To Phone
11. Death In Vegas - Dirge (Slam Remix)
12. Kit Clayton - WShape Revisited
13. Ratio - Spacecats
14. G-Man - Quo Vadis
15. Hell - This Is For You (Terence Fixmer Mix)

== Awards ==
In its debut year the series was nominated for four BAFTA Scotland New Talent Awards: Best Television Performance nominations for both Dawn Steele and Kate Dickie. As well as wins for Best Producer, Robbie Allen and Best Television Director for actress turned director Caroline Paterson.

The series was also nominated for two UK BAFTA's in the category of Best New Writer. Brothers Ed and Martin McCardie were both nominated against each other for the award, with Ed winning UK BAFTA Best New Writer of 2000.

== Tinsel Town - 25th Anniversary ==
In 2026, to commemorate the 25th Anniversary of Tinsel Town, Series One and Series Two were re-released on YouTube for the very first time in HD quality to a Tinsel Town Television channel, with all twenty episodes released on a weekly basis.

This re-release is the first time Series Two has been seen in over 20 years, as it was never released on VHS or DVD during its original release.

Initited by fan led TikTok account 'Tinsel Town TV' which had garnered over half a million views in 6 months, bringing Tinsel Town to a new generation of viewers after a wave of early 2000's nostalgia.

The Tinsel Town soundtrack is also now on Spotify as a curated playlist, with the same track listing as the original BBC Music 2XCD release.
