= Kate Dickie =

Scottish actress (born 1971)

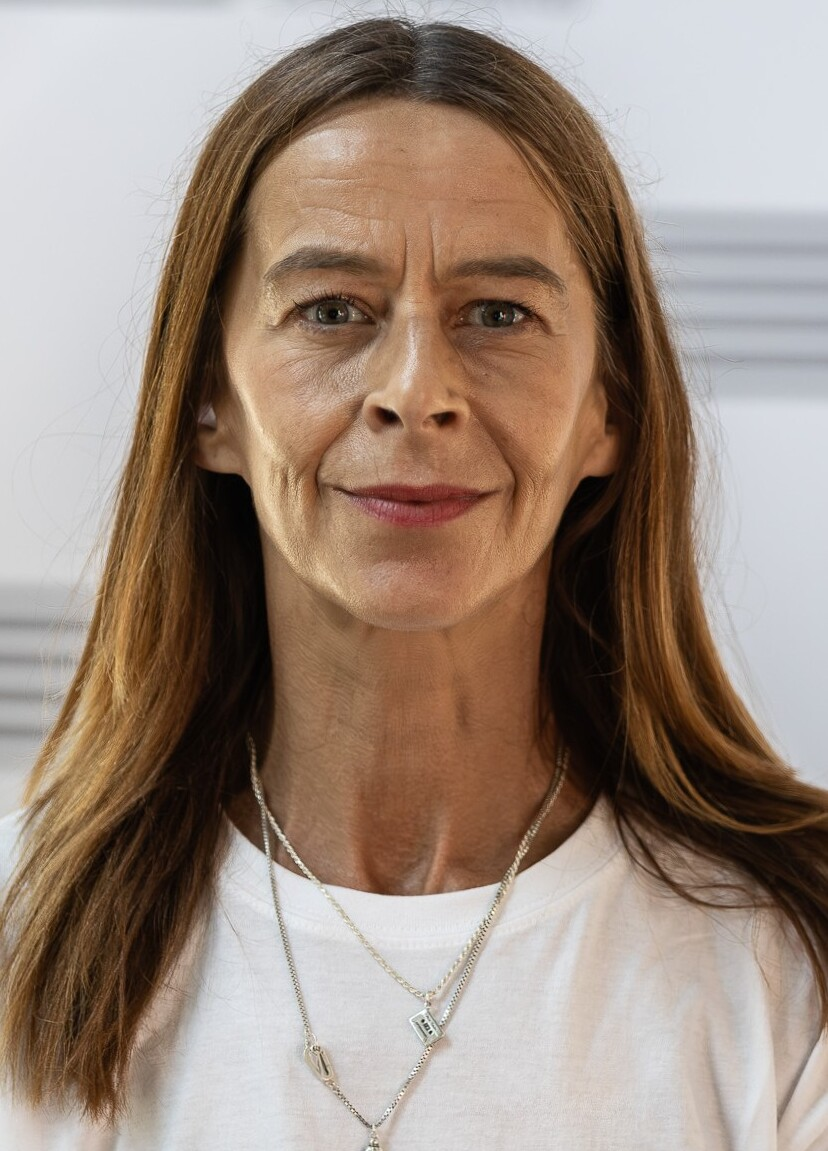
- Dickie in 2025
- Born: 1971 (age 54–55); East Kilbride, Lanarkshire, Scotland
- Education: Royal Scottish Academy of Music and Drama
- Occupation: Actress
- Years active: 1994–present
- Children: 1

Kate Dickie (born 1971) (Note: Sources vary on Dickie's birthdate, though the majority state 4 July 1971.) is a Scottish actress who has appeared in television series, stage plays and films. She is known for her television roles as Lex in the BBC series Tinsel Town (2000–2001) and Lysa Arryn in the HBO series Game of Thrones (2011, 2014).

Dickie is also known for her portrayal of the security operative Jackie in her 2006 feature-film debut Red Road, directed by Andrea Arnold, for which she won several awards, including Best Actress at the British Academy Scotland Awards and the British Independent Film Award for Best Actress. She again won Best Actress at the 2016 British Academy Scotland Awards for the film Couple in a Hole. Her other film appearances include Prometheus (2012), Filth (2013), The Witch (2015), and Star Wars: The Last Jedi (2017).

== Early life ==
Dickie was born in East Kilbride, Scotland. She spent part of her childhood in different parts of Scotland, including Wigtownshire, Galloway, Perthshire, and Ayrshire, due to her family's frequent moves. From an early age, she discovered her passion for acting, which her parents supported. Coming from a working-class family (her father was a farmer and gardener) in which no family member had been in the arts before, she was embarrassed to call herself an actress since she was afraid to be called pretentious.

Her desire for drama classes helped her overcome the insecurities that appeared through the frequent school changes and helped her deal with adjusting to new people and surroundings. After leaving school she went to college in Kirkcaldy to study for a national certificate in drama. In 1990, she won a place at the Royal Scottish Academy of Music and Drama and decided to stay in Glasgow.

== Career ==
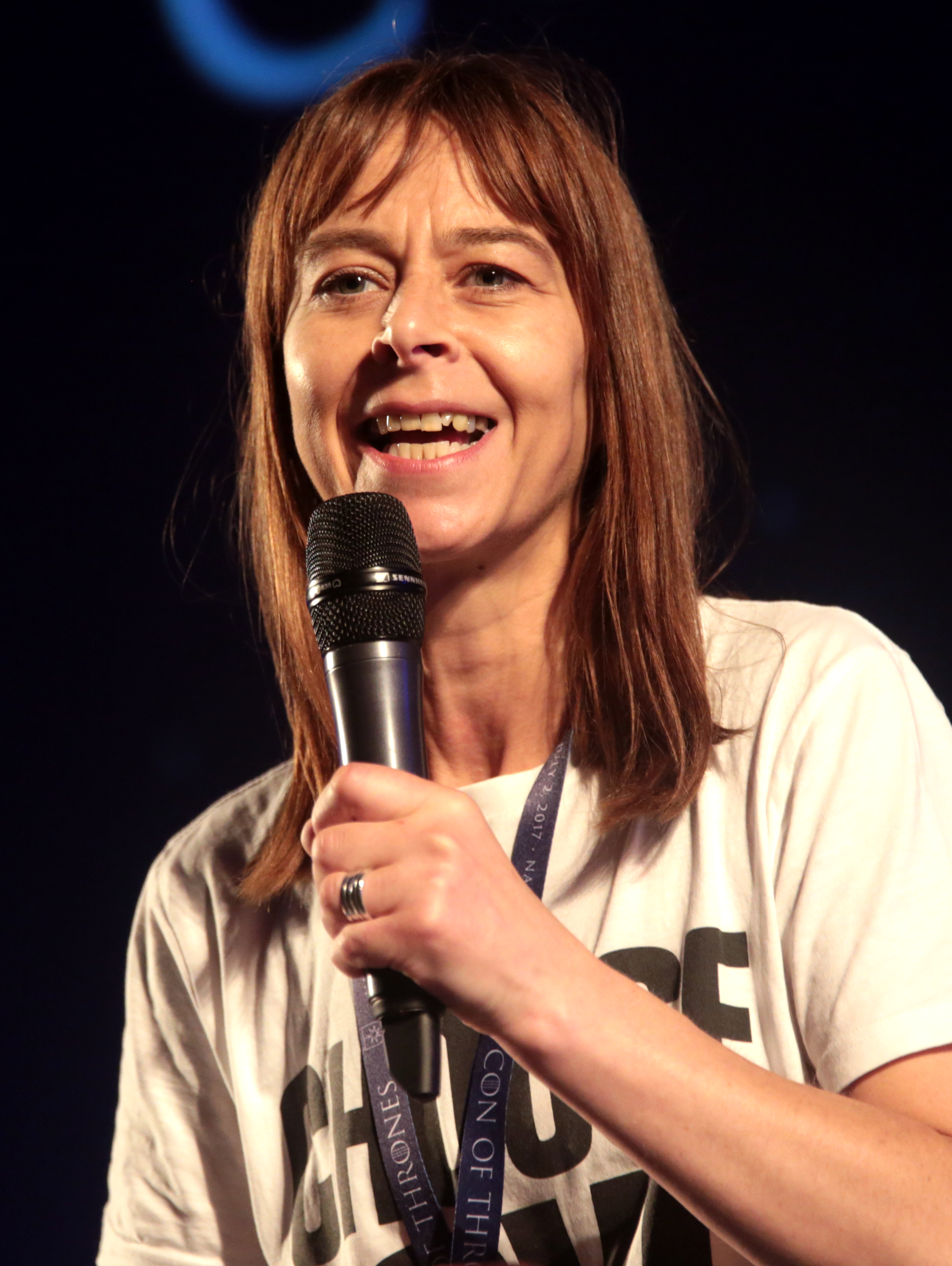
Dickie in 2017 speaking at an event in Nashville, Tennessee

Dickie started to work in the theatre. She achieved her breakthrough in 2000, in the BBC Scotland / Raindog series Tinsel Town.

Through Dickie's performance in her film debut, Red Road, with her former drama schoolmate and co-star Tony Curran, she gained more recognition as a serious actress.

In the stage play Aalst, based on the true story of a couple who had killed their children and were sentenced in a high-profile trial, Dickie plays one of the parents. Her motivation to perform this role was her feeling of "responsibility to play people like that and to give them a voice. People who are not necessarily good or nice and have good lives."

She reprised the role of Jackie in Donkeys, a follow-up to Red Road which is directed by Morag McKinnon. She portrayed Mary in the United Kingdom supernatural thriller film Outcast. Dickie was a swimming trainer in the 2010 television film Dive. She appears in the HBO television series Game of Thrones, where she plays the role of Lysa Arryn. In 2018, Dickie appeared in a season 5 episode of Shetland. In 2020, she appeared with Emma Stansfield in the music video for Sleaford Mods' previously unreleased song "Second".

== Filmography ==
=== Film ===
Year	Title	Role	Note
2003	Room for the Night	Prostitute	Short film
2005	Who Do You Love?	Mum	Short film
2006	Accidents	Mum	Short film
2006	Red Road	Jackie	
2006	The Harvest	Emma Bovey	Short film
2008	Somers Town	Jane	
2008	Summer	Janice	
2008	Trace	Karen	Short film
2008	Pussyfooting	Joan	Short film
2009	Believe	Janice	
2010	Outcast	Mary	
2010	Native Son	Policewoman	Short film (Cinema Extreme)
2010	Donkeys	Jackie	
2012	Prometheus	Ford	
2012	Shell	Claire	
2013	Filth	Chrissie	
2013	Not Another Happy Ending	Anna le Fevre	
2013	For Those in Peril	Cathy	
2014	Soror	Amanda	Short film
2014	Catch Me Daddy		
2015	The Witch	Katherine	
2015	Couple in a Hole	Karen	
2015	Gracie	Mary	Short film
2016	Prevenge	Ella	
2017	Star Wars: The Last Jedi	First Order Officer	
2018	Tell It to the Bees	Pam Kranmer	
2019	Balance, Not Symmetry	Mary Walker	
2019	Get Duked!	Sergeant Morag	
2019	Our Ladies	Sister Condron	
2020	Wildfire	Veronica	
2021	The Green Knight	Queen Guinevere	
2021	Shepherd	Fisher	
2021	Undergods	Rachel	
2022	The Northman	Halldora the Pict	
2022	Matriarch	Cellia	
2022	Raven's Hollow	Elizabet Ingram	
2024	Damaged	Laura Kessler	
2024	Timestalker	Marion	
2025	Honey Bunch	Farah	
2026	Everybody to Kenmure Street	Protestor	Documentary film
2026	Werwulf	TBA	Post-production
TBA	Stages		Filming

=== Television ===
Year	Title	Role	Note
1994	Rab C. Nesbitt	Young girl	Episode: "Mother"
2000–2001	Tinsel Town	Lex	
2003	The Vice	Beverly	Episode: "Gameboys"
2003	Taggart		Episode: "Penthouse and Pavement"
2004	Still Game	Pregnant Girl	Episode: "Swottin"
2006	Film '72	Herself	
2007	Taggart	Wendy Nuget	Episode: "Island"
2008	He Kills Coppers	Janis	
2010	Five Daughters	Isabella Clennell	2 episodes
2010	Dive	Alison	2 episodes
2010	The Pillars of the Earth	Agnes Builder	
2011, 2014	Game of Thrones	Lysa Arryn	Recurring role
2012	New Tricks	DCI Fiona MacDougall	Episode: "Glasgow UCOS"
2013	By Any Means	Patricia Brooks	Episode #1, 2
2015	London Spy	Editor	Episode: "Strangers"
2015	The Frankenstein Chronicles	Mrs. Bishop	
2016	One of Us	Sal	4 episodes
2017	Vera	Nell Hinkin	Episode: "The Blanket Mire"
2018	The Cry	Morven Davis	
2018	The Alienist	Scotch Annie	Episode: "There Bloody Thoughts"
2019	Shetland	DI Sam Boyd	1 episode
2019	Peaky Blinders	Mother Superior	Episode: "Strategy"
2020	The English Game	Aileen Suter	2 episodes
2020	The Nest	Sergeant McClelland	
2021–2023	Annika	DCI Diane Oban	Main role
2021	Summer Camp Island	Professor Elliott (voice)	Episode: "Oscar and the Monsters Chapter 3: Witches Brew"
2022	Inside Man	Morag	
2023	Star Wars: Visions	Officer (voice)	Episode: "In the Stars"
2023	Loki	General Dox	3 episodes
2023	Boat Story	Katia	
2024	The Day of the Jackal	Alison Stoke	
2025	Dept. Q	Moira Jacobson	9 episodes

=== Stage ===
Year	Title	Role
1994	Bonjour Tristesse	
1997–98	Timeless	
1999	Electra	Electra
1999	Mainstream	
2000	AD	
2001	Blooded	
2002	Running Girl	Running Girl
2002–03	Lament	
2003	The Entertainer	
2005	Boiling a Frog	Fooaltiyeman
2005	Trojan Woman	Andromache
2007	Aalst	Cathy Delany
2014	Our Town	Mrs Webb

=== Video game ===
Year	Title	Role
2020	The Complex	

== Awards and nominations ==
Year	Award	Work	Result
2000	British Academy Scotland Award Best Television Performance	Tinsel Town	Nominated
2006	British Academy Scotland Award Best Actress in a Scottish Film	Red Road	Won
2006	British Independent Film Award for Best Actress in a British Independent Film	Red Road	Won
2006	Montreal Festival of New Cinema Acting Award for Best Actress	Red Road	Won
2007	London Film Critics' Circle Award for British Actress of the Year	Red Road	Nominated
2016	British Academy Scotland Award for Best Actress in a Scottish Film	Couple in a Hole	Won
