= 2018 British Academy Scotland Awards =

- Date: 4 November 2018
- Site: Radisson Blu Hotel, Glasgow, Scotland
- Hosted by: Edith Bowman

Television coverage
- Network: Streaming webcast

The 28th British Academy Scotland Awards was held on 4 November 2018 at the Radisson Blu Hotel in Glasgow, honouring the best Scottish film and television productions of 2017. The nominations were announced by Edith Bowman on 26 September 2018.

== Winners and nominees ==
Winners are listed first and highlighted in boldface.

Best Feature Film	Best Director (Fiction)
**Nae Pasaran**; Anna and the Apocalypse; The Party's Just Beginning	**Armando Iannucci - The Death of Stalin**; Colm McCarthy - Black Mirror: Black Museum; Matt Palmer - Calibre
Best Actor in Film	Best Actress in Film
**Jack Lowden - Calibre**; Tony Curran - Calibre; Martin McCann - Calibre	**Shauna Macdonald - White Chamber**; Ella Hunt - Anna and the Apocalypse; Sian Phillips - Voyageuse
Best Entertainment	Best Features & Factual Series
**Armchair Detectives**; Last Commanders; Raven	**Violent Men: Behind Bards**; Class of Mom and Dad; The Force: The Story of Scotland's Police
Best Actor in Television	Best Actress in Television
**Chris Reilly - The Last Post**; Douglas Henshall - Shetland; Jonathan Watson - Two Doors Down	**Elaine C. Smith - Two Doors Down**; Morven Christie - The A Word; Kiran Sonia Sawar - Black Mirror: Crocodile
Best Writer Film/Television	Best Television Scripted
**Armando Iannucci - The Death of Stalin**; David Kane - Shetland; Matt Palmer - Calibre	**Scot Squad - Jack Docherty, Joe Hullait, Rab Christie, Iain Davidson**; Shetland - Silverprint Pictures/BBC One; Trust Me - Red Production Company/BBC One
Best Director (Factual)	Best Specialist Factual
**John MacLaverty - Scotland 78: A Love Story**; Matt Pinder - Violent Men: Behind Bars; Felipe Bustos Sierra - Nae Pasaran	**Imagine...Rupert Everett: BornTo Be Wilde - BBC Studios, Pacific Quay Productions/BBC One**; The Cancer Hospital - Andrew Abbott, Louise Lockwood, Iain Scollay; Trust Me I'm A Doctor - Mental Health Special - BBC Studios, Science Unit/BBC Two
Best Single Documentary	Best Short Film
**Scotland 78: A Love Story - IMG Productions Scotland/BBC One Scotland**; Breadline Kids - Louise Pirie, Audrey McColligan, Iain Scollay, Nicole Kleeman; Life Behind Bars: Visiting Hour - Production Team - Chalkboard/Channel 4	**My Loneliness Is Killing Me - Tim Courtney, Michael Richardson, Siobhan Fahey, Stuart Condy**; I Was Here - Joe Carter, Morna Pearson, Dave Gillies, Susannah Armitage; Slap - Simone Smith
Best Animation	Best Game
**Widdershins**; Scottish Cup; Short Changed	**Beckett**; Cobi Hoops 2; OOO: Ascension

=== Outstanding Contribution to Film & Television ===
- Alan Cumming

=== Outstanding Contribution to Craft ===
- Pat Campbell

=== Outstanding Contribution to the Scottish Industry ===
- Paddy Higson

== See also ==
- 71st British Academy Film Awards
- 90th Academy Awards
- 24th Screen Actors Guild Awards
