= Small Island (novel) =

2004 novel by British author Andrea Levy

- First UK edition
- Author: Andrea Levy
- Language: English
- Published: 2004
- Publisher: Headline Review
- Publication place: UK
- Awards: Orange Prize for Fiction; Whitbread Book of the Year; Commonwealth Writers' Prize
- Preceded by: Fruit of the Lemon
- Followed by: The Long Song

Small Island is a novel written by British author Andrea Levy.

The novel, published in 2004, tells the story of post-war Caribbean migration through four narrators – Hortense and Gilbert, who migrate from Jamaica to London in 1948, and the English couple, Queenie and Bernard, in whose house in London Hortense and Gilbert find lodgings.

== Characters ==
The novel has four main characters, Hortense, Queenie, Gilbert and Bernard, who each tell the story from their point of view.

Mainly set in 1948, the plot focuses on the diaspora of Jamaican immigrants, who, escaping economic hardship on their own "small island", move to England, the Mother Country, for which the men have fought during World War II. While the novel focuses on the narratives of Gilbert and Hortense as they adjust to life in England, after a reception that is not quite the warm embrace that they had hoped for, the interracial relationship between Queenie and Michael is central to the plot and the connections that are established between all of the characters. As the story is narrated from various viewpoints, it is achronological, skipping around to discuss each character's life before the outbreak of WWII. Two of the book's characters were based on black civil rights leader Billy Strachan.

=== Character summaries ===
- Queenie Bligh: The level-headed character in the book. She is fair and open-minded and has a kind heart. After her husband, Bernard, left for the war she opened her house for servicemen, which is when she met Gilbert. She is symbolic of England: Queenie comes with reference to the royal family (she was also christened Victoria - after Queen Victoria) and Bligh comes from Blighty, a slightly dated word for England.
- Hortense: A very well-mannered woman who looks down her nose at other people. She comes from Jamaica and has moved to England with hopes of becoming a teacher, but she has a certain naiveté about what to expect when she arrives. Having been brought up in British colonial Jamaica, she has been taught very many exaggerated facts about the niceties of English living. It becomes quite ironic as she turns out to be more polite and well spoken than anyone she meets, despite being a little snobbish.
- Michael Roberts: A Jamaican Air Force serviceman who grows up alongside Hortense. Michael is a charming and charismatic man, and his mischievous nature causes him problems with his religious father and the community in which he lives. When he leaves for the Air Force he stays at Queenie's boarding house in England and begins a relationship with her, resulting in Queenie's pregnancy. Queenie and Michael's relationship is brief and he is never aware of the baby, and neither Queenie nor Hortense ever find out that they both know Michael.
- Gilbert Joseph: A lovable and funny character who is always trying his hardest to please everyone. Very clumsy but honest, he is one of the more likable characters. He is quite laid back, but extremely intimidated by Hortense, his wife.
- Bernard Bligh: An extremely reserved character who interacts very poorly with almost everyone, until the RAF which forces interaction upon him. He is however, and albeit awkwardly, in love with his wife Queenie, though their sexual life is, largely due to him, not good, a fact which has ramifications later. He has a deep-seated streak of racism and while Queenie appears to be free of this in some ways, both have complicated interactions with race, culminating in the book's climax.

== Critical reception and other recognition ==
It was published by Headline Review to critical success.

On 5 November 2019 BBC News included Small Island on its list of the 100 most influential novels. It was described in The Guardian by Mike Phillips as Levy's "big book".

Levy said in 2004: "When I started Small Island I didn’t intend to write about the war. I wanted to start in 1948 with two women, one white, one black, in a house in Earls Court, but when I asked myself, 'Who are these people and how did they get here?' I realised that 1948 was so very close to the war that nothing made sense without it. If every writer in Britain were to write about the war years there would still be stories to be told, and none of us would have come close to what really happened. It was such an amazing schism in the middle of a century. And Caribbean people got left out of the telling of that story, so I am attempting to put them back into it. But I am not telling it from only a Jamaican point of view. I want to tell stories from the black and white experience. It is a shared history."

In 2009, The Guardian selected Small Island as one of the defining books of the decade. It won three awards: the Whitbread Book of the Year, the Orange Prize, and the Commonwealth Writers' Prize.

In 2022, Small Island was included on the "Big Jubilee Read" list of 70 books by Commonwealth authors, selected to celebrate the Platinum Jubilee of Elizabeth II.

== Adaptations ==
The novel was adapted for television in two parts by the BBC in 2009. A stage adaptation by Helen Edmundson opened at the National Theatre in April 2019 and the production was discussed with members of the cast on BBC Radio 4's Woman's Hour in May 2019.
