= Small Island (TV series) =

- UK DVD cover
- Genre: Drama
- Based on: Small Island (2004) by Andrea Levy
- Written by: Paula Milne and Sarah Williams
- Directed by: John Alexander
- Starring: Naomie Harris; Ruth Wilson; Benedict Cumberbatch; David Oyelowo; Ashley Walters; Nikki Amuka-Bird; Karl Johnson
- Narrated by: Hugh Quarshie
- Composer: Martin Phipps
- Country of origin: United Kingdom
- Original language: English
- No. of episodes: 2

Production
- Executive producers: Paula Milne, Alison Owen, Lucy Richer
- Producers: Joanna Anderson; Vicky Licorish; Grainne Marmion
- Cinematography: Tony Miller
- Editor: Roy Sharman
- Running time: 180 min (total)

Original release
- Network: BBC One
- Release: 6 December – 13 December 2009

Small Island is a two-part 2009 BBC One television drama adapted from the 2004 novel of the same title by Andrea Levy. The programme stars Naomie Harris and Ruth Wilson as joint respective female protagonists Hortense Roberts and Queenie Bligh, two women who struggle to fulfil their personal ambitions and dreams amidst the chaos of World War II London and Jamaica.

The drama was developed by producers Joanna Anderson and Vicky Licorish of AL Films, after having optioned Levy's novel. The script was first written by Sarah Williams and later amended by Paula Milne. It was directed by John Alexander (who also directed the BBC's 2008 adaptation of Jane Austen's Sense and Sensibility). The drama consists of two 90-minute episodes that premiered on 6 December 2009, subsequently being shown in the United States on PBS as part of the channel's Masterpiece Classic Collection beginning on 18 April 2010.

== Plot ==
The story is centred on four main characters: Hortense, Queenie, Gilbert, and Bernard. It focuses on the diaspora of Jamaican immigrants during and after World War II. Trying to escape economic hardship on their own "small island," they have moved to England, the Mother Country, for which the men have fought during the war. However, they find they are not readily accepted into their new society.

The beginning or prologue of the story focuses on the young Jamaican girl, Hortense, who has three dreams: to marry her childhood companion Michael, to move to faraway England, and to become a teacher. The story then shifts to London, where we meet Queenie and Bernard. Queenie is a poor working-class girl from Yorkshire who longs for better things in her life than her family's pig farming business. An aunt in London takes her in and employs her in a shop. When her aunt dies suddenly, Queenie marries the well-to-do Bernard Bligh, in order to avoid having to move back to the pig farm. World War II then uproots all of their lives: Michael, in disgrace after being caught in an adulterous relationship, leaves Jamaica to join the Royal Air Force (RAF). Bernard, impulsively, also joins the RAF, leaving Queenie to look after Albert his father, who suffers from shell shock after fighting in World War I.

During the war, Queenie lets the house to soldiers who need temporary quarters. One night, three airmen come, including a black Jamaican, Michael. The two share a night together, after which Michael and the other airmen leave for their next mission. Later, Hortense, sad about Michael's departure, thinks she has seen him and rushes over to greet him. The man she greets is in fact Gilbert Joseph, a man who slightly resembles Michael. The story then follows Gilbert's own experiences in the war. He enlists in the RAF and, while stationed in Yorkshire, meets Queenie, who has left London with Albert during The Blitz. Queenie and Gilbert become platonic friends, but their friendship angers some racist American soldiers who attack him. In the resulting fight, several other soldiers get involved and shots are fired. Queenie's father-in-law is killed by a stray bullet.

After the war, Gilbert returns to Jamaica, where he has a hard time adjusting to life and the lack of opportunities. He wants to go back to England, where he hopes to find work. However, he does not have the fare for the ship's passage. He runs into Hortense again, since he is dating her friend Celia. Hortense hears of Gilbert's plans to go to England. Jealous of the fact that her friend Celia will get to go to England, Hortense blurts out that Celia has a mentally ill mother, who she plans to leave in a care home. Gilbert is disgusted that Celia would do this, and it is implied that he and Celia break up. Desperate to get to England, Hortense offers Gilbert the money for the fare, on condition that he marry her and send for her when he has found work and a place to live. They lodge with Queenie Bligh, who has had to fend for herself after Bernard did not return following the war. Both women have married in unpromising circumstances, as love is a luxury neither can afford. Hortense remembers her life in Jamaica and the profound love she had for Michael. Queenie also remembers her love for and her night of passion with the same Michael. The two young women do not know they share a secret.

Hortense tries to begin her new life in England by looking for work as a teacher, her dream job. She soon learns England is not the golden land she hoped it would be, and that Jamaicans and blacks are despised and discriminated against. She and Gilbert suffer racism and ignorance, but in adversity they discover new qualities in each other and actually begin to fall in love.

Queenie is shocked when her husband Bernard returns to her after years away. When she goes into labour and has a dark-skinned baby, the father is known (by the film's audience) to be Michael after he returned to her house before travelling to Canada for a fresh start. Hortense does not discover that this is the same Michael she grew up with and hoped to marry (her father was a white official in Jamaica and her mother his black servant; they had given the baby to Michael's parents to raise).

Despite the fact that Bernard is racist, he offers to raise the child with Queenie. She refuses, however, believing that he would come to blame all of the things in his life that go badly on the baby. She stops Hortense and Gilbert as they are leaving to start a new life elsewhere and begs them to take the baby, whom she has named Michael.

They initially refuse, but later agree, and take the baby with them whilst an emotional Queenie is comforted by Bernard. Queenie gave the Josephs a photo of herself and a little money to help the baby.

The scene then flashes forward to the present day. It is revealed that Queenie and Michael's baby, who now has grandchildren of his own, has been the story's narrator. One of his grandchildren looks at a picture of Queenie and asks who she is. He replies that she is his mother.

== Cast and characters ==
- Naomie Harris as Hortense Roberts

Born out of wedlock in an illegitimate, but not loveless, liaison between her affluent Jamaican father, of a fairer complexion, and an illiterate dark-skinned farm girl, Hortense is brought up by her father's cousin as playmate to his son, Michael. After Michael's return from boarding school, Hortense realises her feelings for him are more than just fraternal.

A naturally proud and headstrong woman, Hortense has always kept her true parentage a secret. She also has a strong sense of her own destiny: to live in England with Michael and be a teacher there. When Michael is sent away to the war, Hortense instinctively fights to keep her dream alive and proposes to Gilbert, a man she hardly knows, but someone who will aid her passage to England. She arrives in a country that both surprises and disappoints her in its bleak and unfriendly "greyness", but it is through this new life that she discovers a different side to her character and, for the first time, the meaning of true love.

- Ruth Wilson as Queenie Bligh

Pretty Queenie is a tough survivor, with a good heart. Brought up on a pig farm in Yorkshire, from an early age she grows to hate the smell of the pigs, the squalor and the blood. With dreams of escape, she finally gets her wish when her kindly Aunt sends the train fare to London. Queenie is open-minded and hungry for new experiences. Full of youth and vitality, she goes to London with hope in her heart. Despite trying to better herself with elocution lessons, she can never quite shake her Yorkshire vowels.

When an unexpected death forces her into the arms of the educated but rather uninspiring Bernard, Queenie believes that her dreams are lost to her for ever. But the war brings Queenie new experiences when Bernard is sent to the front line, and she embarks upon a dangerous but ultimately awakening affair.

- David Oyelowo as Gilbert Joseph

Gilbert appears the charming fool, but underneath he is a principled and naturally idealistic man who signs up to fight the war in England—not only with hopes of bettering himself, but also because he knows the world will be a darker place if Hitler is not defeated.

He has come from a poor but happy family in Jamaica and has tried to make his way despite being plagued by bad luck. His disappointments in England do not diminish him, and he relishes the newly opened-up world. On returning to Jamaica, he realises quite how small his island is. Unable to afford the fare for the Empire Windrush, he accepts the offer from the proud and snobbish Hortense to pay for his passage in exchange for marriage. He knows he is being bought and is aware that he's cheap at the price. His marriage to Hortense may be one of convenience, but over time she begins to see the noble, kind and wise man that Gilbert is, which allows him to grow into the person he was destined to become.

- Benedict Cumberbatch as Bernard Bligh

Bernard Bligh is a middle-ranking bank clerk in his late twenties. He has lived alone with his father in a large house in London ever since his mother died. His father suffers from shell shock after serving in the Great War and, as a result, never speaks.

Into this quiet and stable life breezes the lovely Queenie, who works at the shop where he buys The Times newspaper every day. She awakens in him feelings he did not know he had, and after several outings he plucks up the courage to kiss her. After their marriage, Bernard soon reverts to his repressed and buttoned-down state, unable to open up and become the man and husband Queenie needs. Like many he suffers psychologically in the war, so much so that he cannot even recognise himself. Deep down, he knows he will never be enough for Queenie, but he cannot stop loving her.

- Ashley Walters as Michael Roberts

Michael is the son of the strict and god-fearing Mr Philip. Beguiling and non-conformist, with a streak of luck that runs through his life, Michael is brought up alongside Hortense—his rebellious streak always leading her into mischief. Hortense adores him, but he can only see her as a younger sister and is oblivious to her feelings. Returning from boarding school as an independent, handsome man, Michael soon begins a scandalous affair with a local teacher, before joining the British air force.

When he finds Queenie in England, he feels an immediate connection to her, but Michael's selfish nature means that he can never be tied down.

- Nikki Amuka-Bird as Celia Langley
- Hugh Quarshie as narrator/adult Michael junior
- Karl Johnson as Arthur Bligh
- Shaun Parkes as Winston/Kenneth
- Jonathan Harden as the postal worker

== Episodes ==
No.	Title	Directed by	Written by	Original release date	Viewers (millions)
1	"Episode One"	Paula Milne and Sarah Williams	John Alexander	6 December 2009	5.02
London 1948: Hortense joins Gilbert, her new husband, in England, where he is lodging with Queenie Bligh. The women have both married in unpromising circumstances as love is a luxury neither can afford. As Hortense remembers her life in Jamaica and the profound love she had for Michael and his betrayal of her, Queenie also remembers her night of passion with the same Michael when her husband was away at war. Initially suspicious of each other, will they uncover the secret they share?
2	"Episode Two"	Paula Milne and Sarah Williams	John Alexander	13 December 2009	3.24
Hortense begins her new life in England and soon learns it is not the golden land she hoped it would be. She and Gilbert suffer racism and ignorance, but in adversity they discover new qualities in each other and begin to fall in love. Queenie is shocked when her husband Bernard returns to her after years away. When she goes into labour and has a baby by a mysterious father, the lives of all four are changed for ever.

== Reception ==
Sam Wollaston of The Guardian praised the BBC for adapting a more modern novel set in a period other than the nineteenth century, observing: "BBC does big budget Sunday night dramatisation minus bonnets and breeches—yay!" He noted that although he did not "have anything against the old stuff" the classics were in danger of being "dramatised to death". Of the drama itself, he observed that the programme was "sumptuous to look at" and very "loyal to the novel... both in plot and how it shares its warmth". He singled out Naomie Harris's performance as particularly impressive.

Guy Adams of The Independent was surprised and impressed with the BBC for using its Sunday-night flagship slot to show something that was not "very formal, very English, and very safe", instead offering "thought-provoking" drama that he acclaimed as "beautifully paced and at times very moving". Cast member David Oyelowo also praised the production as something fresh and new, noting that "The black experience has been very under-represented in terms of drama, and maybe Small Island can help highlight what an oversight that is."

Not all reviewers, however, were as enthusiastic. John Preston of The Telegraph complained that the time-shifts in the screenplay "made it extremely hard to settle into the story" and derided the narration as weak and simplistic. He concluded that "tonally and narratively the result [is] a mess".

James Walton, also of The Telegraph, was a little more generous but also complained of the weaknesses in the screenplay, labelling the narration as an "unignorable flaw", something that "diminishes [the action] to a series of staggering banalities." Nevertheless, he noted the drama's positive qualities, including the "sheer interest of the subject matter and the sheer generosity of the storytelling", which was full of "sympathy and warmth". He also praised the cast, noting how "performances were generally strong enough to compensate for the script".

Upon its April 2010 US premiere on Masterpiece Classic, Matthew Gilbert of The Boston Globe wrote:

This evocative two-part miniseries has a lot going for it: rich period design, an engagingly twisty plot, performances with depth, intriguing racial and class issues. But the superfluous narrator? Like a few other melodramatic flourishes, including a heightened soundtrack and some inordinately sudsy dialogue about dreams and desires, he detracts. By insisting we recognize the vast import and intensity of the “Small Island’’ story that we’re watching, he only adds a kitschy veneer. If you can sink into "Small Island" despite the kitsch, you will be rewarded with a piece of poignant historical fiction.

== Awards and nominations ==
Awards
Award	Category	Name	Outcome
British Academy Television Awards 2010	Best Actor	David Oyelowo	Nominated
British Academy Television Awards 2010	Best Supporting Actor	Benedict Cumberbatch	Nominated
British Academy Television Awards 2010	Best Drama Serial	John Alexander, Vicky Licorish, Paula Milne, Alison Owen	Nominated
British Academy Television Awards 2010	Best Original Television Music	Martin Phipps	Won
British Academy Television Awards 2010	Best Photography & Lighting, Fiction	Tony Miller	Nominated
36th Broadcasting Press Guild Awards 2010	Writer's Award	Paula Milne	Nominated
Royal Television Society Programme Awards 2010	Best Actress	Naomie Harris	Won
Royal Television Society Programme Awards 2010	Best Actor	David Oyelowo	Won
International Emmy Awards 2010	TV movie/Mini-series	AL Films	Won
