= Andrea Levy =

English author (1956–2019)

Andrea Levy FRSL
- Born: Andrea Doreen Levy; 7 March 1956; London, England
- Died: 14 February 2019 (aged 62); London, England
- Education: Highbury Hill Grammar School; Middlesex Polytechnic
- Occupation: Author
- Spouse: Bill Mayblin
- Writing career
- Language: English
- Period: 1994–2019
- Notable works: Small Island (2004); The Long Song (2010)
- Notable awards: Orange Prize for Fiction; Whitbread Book of the Year; Commonwealth Writers' Prize; Walter Scott Prize
- Website: Andrea Levy

Andrea Levy FRSL (7 March 1956 – 14 February 2019) was an English author best known for the novels Small Island (2004) and The Long Song (2010). She was born in London to Jamaican parents, and her work explores topics related to British Jamaicans and how they negotiate racial, cultural and national identities.

== Background and early life ==
Levy was of primarily Afro-Jamaican descent. She had a Jewish paternal grandfather and a Scots maternal great-grandfather. She said in a 2004 article: "Jews went to Jamaica in the 1600s. My paternal grandfather was born Orthodox Jewish, from a very strict family, but after fighting in the First World War he became a Christian and came back and married my grandmother. His family disowned him, so I don't know much about them." Her father came to Britain on the HMT Empire Windrush in 1948, with her mother following later that year on a banana boat.

Andrea Doreen Levy was born at the Whittington Hospital in Archway, north London, "the fourth, and baby, of the family, by a long way". She grew up on a council estate in Highbury, also in north London, and had what she described as "the life of an ordinary London working-class girl". She attended Highbury Hill Grammar School and studied textile design and weaving at Middlesex Polytechnic.

== Career ==
Levy began her career as a costume assistant, working part-time in the costume departments of the BBC and the Royal Opera House, while starting a graphic design company with her husband Bill Mayblin. During this time, she experienced a form of awakening to her identity concerning both her gender and her race. At a racial-awareness session with colleagues at an Islington sex education project, she found herself having to choose between a "white" and "black" side, which she found a "rude awakening". Having not read a book until the age of 23, she subsequently became aware of the power of books and began to read "excessively". It was easy enough to find literature by black writers from the United States, but she could find very little literature from black writers in the United Kingdom. (A similar recognition led Marsha Hunt in 1995 to initiate the Saga Prize, for which Levy would become a judge.)

Levy began writing in her mid-30s, after her father died. It was not a therapeutic attempt to deal with her loss, but rather a need to understand where she came from. In 1989, she enrolled in Alison Fell's Creative Writing class at the City Lit, continuing with the course for seven years.

Levy struggled initially to get her work published, her first novel being rejected by several companies that were unsure of how to market her writing. She spoke in a 1999 interview of the "herd mentality" of publishers worried about the possibly limited market appeal of her work: "the main problem was that they perceived it as being just about race, and thought it would only appeal to black readers." However, as Margaret Busby noted, Levy "proved that to write about... migration from the specific yet complex perspective of being a black English female is not a limitation to finding a wide and appreciative readership, but in fact the exact opposite."

== Work ==
In 1994, Levy's first novel, the semi-autobiographical Every Light in the House Burnin', was published and attracted favourable reviews. The Independent on Sunday stated: "This story of a young girl in the 60s in north London, child of Jamaican migrants, stands comparison with some of the best stories about growing up poor – humorous and moving, unflinching and without sentiment". Her second novel, Never Far from Nowhere (1996), is a coming-of-age story about two sisters of Jamaican parentage, Vivian and Olive, growing up in Finsbury Park, London in the 1970s. It was long-listed for the Orange Prize.

After Never Far from Nowhere, Levy visited Jamaica for the first time and what she learned of her family's past provided material for her next book, Fruit of the Lemon (1999). The novel is set in England and Jamaica during the Thatcher era, highlighting the differences between Jamaican natives and their British descendants. The New York Times noted the novel "illuminates the general situation facing all children of postcolonial immigrants".

Levy's fourth novel, Small Island (2004), which looks at the immediate outcomes of World War II and migration on what became known as the Windrush generation, was a critical success. The Guardian's reviewer, Mike Phillips, praised the writing and the subject matter, calling it Levy's "big book". Levy herself said in 2004: "When I started Small Island I didn't intend to write about the war. I wanted to start in 1948 with two women, one white, one black, in a house in Earls Court, but when I asked myself, 'Who are these people and how did they get here?' I realised that 1948 was so very close to the war that nothing made sense without it. If every writer in Britain were to write about the war years there would still be stories to be told, and none of us would have come close to what really happened. It was such an amazing schism in the middle of a century. And Caribbean people got left out of the telling of that story, so I am attempting to put them back into it. But I am not telling it from only a Jamaican point of view. I want to tell stories from the black and white experience. It is a shared history." Small Island won three awards, the Whitbread Book of the Year, the Orange Prize and the Commonwealth Writers' Prize. The novel was subsequently made into a two-part television drama of the same title that was broadcast by the BBC in December 2009. A stage adaptation written by Helen Edmundson premiered at the National Theatre's Olivier Theatre in 2019, returning in 2022.

Levy's fifth and final novel, The Long Song, won the 2011 Walter Scott Prize and was shortlisted for the 2010 Man Booker Prize. The Daily Telegraph called it a "sensational novel". Kate Kellaway in The Observer commented: "The Long Song reads with the sort of ebullient effortlessness that can only be won by hard work." The novel was adapted as a three-part BBC One television series that was broadcast in December 2018.

Levy's short book Six Stories and an Essay was published in 2014. It begins with an autobiographical essay and includes stories that are drawn from various life experiences. Levy contributed to the 2019 anthology New Daughters of Africa (edited by Margaret Busby), which has enabled an annual scholarship at SOAS University of London.

Bonnie Greer paid tribute to Andrea Levy: "For every great writer, their own story is in their work, and is all that you really need to know.... What she described was a people integral to what the UK is. Now and forever. And their bard, Andrea Levy, is immortal."

The Bookseller noted in 2019 that, in the UK, Levy had sold "a total of 1.23 million books for £7.9m, with Small Island her bestseller, selling 758,203 copies in paperback and a further 120,749 for the TV tie-in. It is the biggest-selling winner of the Women's Prize to date."

== Legacy ==
=== Documentary film "Andrea Levy: Her Island Story" (2018) ===
Levy was the subject of a film profile entitled "Andrea Levy: Her Island Story", first shown in December 2018 in Alan Yentob's BBC One television arts documentary series Imagine.

=== Radio profile "Andrea Levy: In Her Own Words" (2020) ===
The BBC Radio 4 programme "Andrea Levy: In Her Own Words" was broadcast on 8 February 2020 in the Archive on 4 series, drawing on an in-depth interview in 2014 with oral historian Sarah O'Reilly for the British Library's Authors' Lives project, in which Levy spoke on condition that the recording would only be released after her death. The interview was accompanied by contributions from friends of Levy's including Gary Younge, Baroness Lola Young, Louise Doughty, and Margaret Busby, as well as Levy's husband Bill Mayblin.

=== Literary archive ===
It was announced in February 2020 that Levy's literary archive had been acquired by the British Library, including notebooks, research material, correspondence, emails and audio recordings.

In 2023, the British Library reported that it had recovered previously unknown material from Levy's computer, including a planned TV series on nurse Mary Seacole, an early draft of Small Island, and work on a factual series on the detailed history of the Caribbean for the BBC that never came to fruition.

=== Commemorative plaque ===
An Islington Heritage Plaque was unveiled in Levy's honour on her childhood home at Twyford House, Elwood Street, in Highbury, on 14 March 2020, at a ceremony attended by her husband Bill Mayblin and family members, Islington councillors, Baroness Lola Young, and other friends.

=== Royal Society of Literature pen collection ===
In November 2020, it was announced that Levy would be the first writer of colour whose pen would join the Royal Society of Literature's historic collection, which includes pens belonging to George Eliot and Lord Byron.

== Personal life and death ==
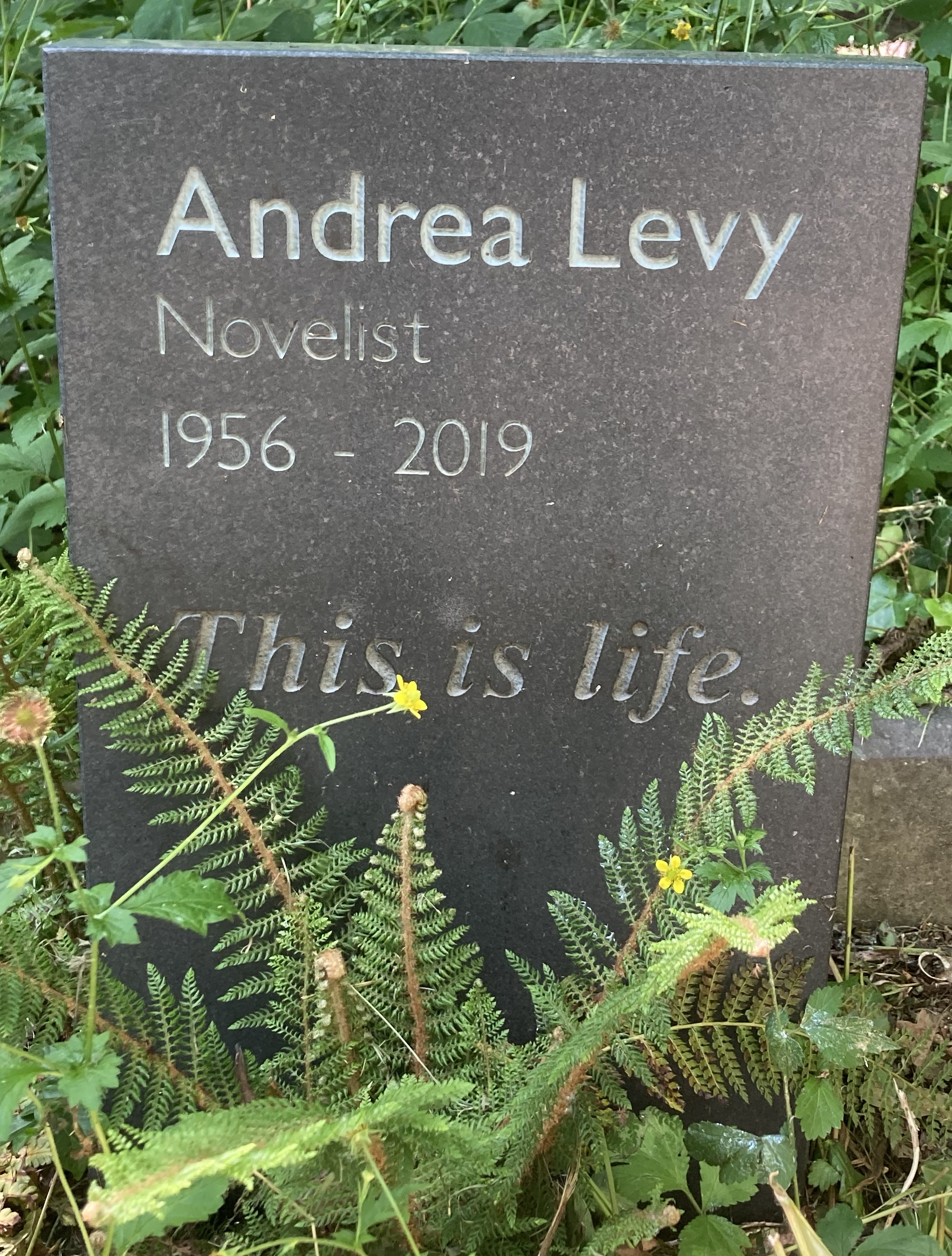
Levy's grave in Highgate Cemetery

Levy was married to Bill Mayblin. She died on 14 February 2019, at her home in Crouch End, London, aged 62, after living with metastatic breast cancer for 15 years, and her ashes were buried on the eastern side of Highgate Cemetery.

== Awards and honours ==
- 2004: Orange Prize for Fiction, winner, Small Island
- 2004: Whitbread Book of the Year, winner, Small Island
- 2005: Commonwealth Writers Prize, winner, Small Island
- 2005: Elected a Fellow of the Royal Society of Literature
- 2010: Man Booker Prize, shortlist, The Long Song
- 2011: Walter Scott Prize (The Long Song)
- 2012: Honorary Fellowship of Queen Mary University of London

== Bibliography ==
- Every Light in the House Burnin′ (1994). Headline Publishing, ISBN 9780747211778.
- Never Far from Nowhere (1996). Headline, ISBN 9780747252139.
- Fruit of the Lemon (1999). Review Publishing, ISBN 9780747273479.
- Small Island (2004). Review Publishing, ISBN 9780755307500.
- The Long Song (2010). Headline Publishing, ISBN 9780755383320.
- Six Stories and an Essay (2014). Tinder Press, ISBN 9781472222671.
- Uriah's War (short story) (2014). Headline Publishing, ISBN 9781472222541.
