= Jeffery Kissoon =

British actor (born 1947)

- Born: 4 September 1947 (age 79); Trinidad, British Windward Islands (present-day Trinidad and Tobago)
- Education: Christopher Wren School
- Occupations: Actor theatre director
- Years active: 1970–present
- Organization(s): Royal Shakespeare Company; Royal National Theatre; Citizens Theatre Company
- Board member of: Shared Experience; Warehouse Theatre Company
- Awards: Peloponnesian International Film Festival Best Lead Actor Award (2012)

Jeffery Kissoon (born 4 September 1947) is a Trinidadian-born British actor and director of stage, screen, and radio.

He has performed with the Royal Shakespeare Company at venues such as the Royal National Theatre, under directors including Peter Brook, Peter Hall, Robert Lepage, Janet Suzman, Calixto Bieito and Nicholas Hytner. He has acted in genres from Shakespeare and modern theatre to television drama and science fiction, playing a range of both leading and supporting roles, from Mark Antony in Antony and Cleopatra and Prospero and Caliban in The Tempest, to Malcolm X in The Meeting and Mr Kennedy in the children's TV series Grange Hill.

A regular director of theatre, Kissoon is a member of the board of directors of the Shared Experience company and the Warehouse Theatre in Croydon, London. He has tutored younger actors, writers and directors, and values the rehearsal process. He played the lead role in the Mark Norfolk film Ham and the Piper (2012), and also directed Norfolk's theatre productions Knock Down Ginger, staged in 2003, Naked Soldiers, 2010 and Where the Flowers Grow, 2011, at the Warehouse Theatre. He reprised his role as Antony in Suzman's production of Antony and Cleopatra, appearing opposite Kim Cattrall as Cleopatra, at the Liverpool Playhouse in 2010.

== Early life and career ==
Born in Trinidad, British Windward Islands (now Trinidad and Tobago) Kissoon, of Dougla heritage, emigrated to London with his parents at an early age. While attending the Christopher Wren School in Shepherd's Bush, he joined the student drama group. In 1970, under Robert Tanitch and Eric Rickman, he made his first appearance as an actor in the film Like You, Like Me, an inter-racial romance.

Although he trained as a drama teacher, Kissoon has worked as an actor since the early 1970s. In 1972, he joined the Glasgow Citizens Theatre Company and, for two years thereafter, played leading roles in a number of productions, including Christopher Marlowe's Tamburlaine The Great and Bertolt Brecht's Threepenny Opera. During this period, he worked with director Keith Hack, who cast him as Tamburlaine for the 1972 Edinburgh Festival, and as Caliban for the Royal Shakespeare Company's 1974 production of The Tempest at The Other Place in Stratford-upon-Avon. Kissoon had his first prominent television role playing Sam in Beryl's Lot for Yorkshire Television (in 1975), after which he played PC Robbins in an episode of Z-Cars and Sonny in a BBC Play for Today titled "Rocky Marciano is Dead" (both in 1976). He portrayed Dr. Ben Vincent in seven episodes of Gerry Anderson's science-fiction series Space 1999 between 1976 and 1977.

In 1985, Kissoon played Karna in Peter Brook's nine-hour stage adaptation of The Mahabharata. The three-year project opened at the Festival d'Avignon in France and completed a world tour, ultimately leading to a film adaptation running to six hours. It also resulted in a lasting professional association between Kissoon and Brook, which witnessed Kissoon play two roles in the director's production of Shakespeare's Hamlet. Kissoon is a veteran cast member of both RSC and Royal National Theatre productions, regularly collaborating with director Sir Peter Hall. In 2002, he participated in a rehearsed reading of Wrong Place at the Soho Theatre, continuing his association with playwright Mark Norfolk whose play ″Knock Down Ginger″ he later directed at the Warehouse Theatre the following year. The play starred former EastEnders actors Judith Jacob, Sylvester Williams and marked the stage debut of Troy Glasgow.

Kissoon's more recent screen and stage credits include W1A (TV series) (BBC, 2017), Star Wars: The Force Awakens, EastEnders (BBC, 2015), Julius Caesar (Royal Shakespeare Company), Ham & The Piper (Mark Norfolk, 2013) Dirty Pretty Things (Stephen Frears, 2002), Crossing Bridges (Mark Norfolk, 2006), Holby City (BBC, 2006), Casualty (BBC, 2008), War and Peace (Hampstead Theatre, 2008), Amazonia (Old Vic, 2009) and The Meeting (Warehouse Theatre, 2009). He played the lead role in Norfolk's film Ham and the Piper (2013), for which he won the Best Lead Actor Award at the 2012 Peloponnesian International Film Festival, after having directed Ewart James Walters, Elisabeth Dahl and Adam Sopp in Norfolk's play Naked Soldiers at the Warehouse Theatre the previous year. He later won a Best Actor at the Eko International Film Festival, Nigeria for his performance in Ham & The Piper. In 2011, Kissoon directed Norfolk's Where the Flowers Grow, again at the Warehouse Theatre. Kissoon reprised his Mark Antony, opposite Kim Cattrall's Cleopatra, in a production of Antony and Cleopatra, directed by Janet Suzman and performed at the Liverpool Playhouse, in October 2010. This was followed by Waiting For Godot at the West Yorkshire Playhouse (co-starring Patrick Robinson) and the RSC's production of Julius Caesar (in the title role). In 2016 Kissoon featured in the Unicorn Theatre's My Father, Odysseus written by Timberlake Wertenbaker and later directed a stunning Hamlet in a contemporary adaptation by Mark Norfolk. The Egyptian-themed production for Black Theatre Live toured nationally in the UK and was noted for its narrative clarity as well as being the first all black company of Shakespeare's tragedy in Britain, including an all black creative team. Kissoon utilised the ancient African martial art form, Ka Zimba during rehearsals, employing professional drumming and movement practitioners to explore how the breath and the natural spirit combine to conjure up character. He and writer, Norfolk maintained their collaboration in 2018 with Kissoon directing Norfolk's play about the world of finance, Dare To Do (The Bear Maxim) for Ka Zimba Theatre at the Space. Rehearsals took place in Notting Hill as a way of engaging with a traumatised community after the recent Grenfell Fire tragedy and they later teamed up again, producing staged readings of edgy new plays at the Muse Gallery & Performance Space in Notting Hill, London, including plays such as The Misclarification of Sulieman Dewani and short plays Dinner With Bono by Mark Norfolk based on the short story by Jackee Butesta Batanda and Birdbath by Leonard Melfi.

In 2019, Kissoon also directed Norfolk's post-Windrush three-hander What A' Fe' Yu', which performed over three nights at the Actors Centre, Tower Street, London, as part of its Johnthreehaw Initiative under the theme of Motherhoods. The cast featured Linda Mathis, Benjamin Cawley and Lenox Kambaba in a narrative that explored family expectations and legacy in contemporary Britain and went on to perform at the Muse Gallery. More recently Kissoon has been appearing as Justice Wainwright on the West End in Agatha Christie's Witness for the Prosecution at County Hall, London.

Kissoon performed in the BBC Radio 4 sitcom Rudy's Rare Records (2008–12) as Rudy's friend Clifton. He also featured in Norfolk's "Broken Chain", a segment of Radio 4's The City Speaks (2008), which is credited as the first "feature film for radio" produced in collaboration with Film London and Arts Council England.

In 2001, Kissoon joined the cast of the BBC soap opera, EastEnders, in which he played a friend of Patrick Trueman (Rudolph Walker). In 2015, Kissoon returned to EastEnders, this time playing the part of Judge Anthony Abego who oversees Max Branning's (Jake Wood) murder trial. A year later, he reprised his role of the judge, this time overseeing the murder trial of the killers of Paul Coker (Jonny Labey).

== Work ==
=== Theatre ===
- Vision of Youth
- Tamburlaine The Great (as Tamburlaine), The Citizen's Company, dir. Keith Hack, 1972
- The Threepenny Opera (as Tiger Brown), The Citizen's Company, dir. Rick Stroud, 1972
- Marat/Sade (as Safter), The Citizen's Company, dir. Rick Stroud, 1972
- Macbeth (as Meru), The Roundhouse, dir. Peter Coe
- The Way of the World
- The Sign in Sidney Brustein's Window
- The Island
- Streamers
- Reflections
- Othello, Bristol Old Vic, dir. Paul Unwin
- Colon's
- Macbeth, Birmingham Repertory Theatre
- Macbeth, The Young Vic
- Love's Labours Lost
- The Tempest (as Caliban), RSC's The Other Place, Stratford-upon-Avon, dir. Keith Hack, 1974
- Last Missionary
- Kingdom of Barth
- King Lear
- Glorious Things
- Measure for Measure (as Provost), dir. Keith Hack, 1974
- City Sugar, Bush Theatre, dir. Stephen Poliakoff, 1976.
- Barbarians: A Trilogy: Killing Time, Abide with Me, In the City, Greenwich Theatre, dir. Keith Hack, 1977.
- The Jail Diary of Albie Sachs, The Warehouse, Royal Shakespeare Company, 1978
- Dr Faustus, Royal Exchange, Manchester, dir. Adrian Noble, 1981
- Marino Faliero, The Young Vic, dir. Keith Hack, 1982
- Oroonoko, Glasgow Citizens Theatre, dir. Phillip Rowse, 1983
- Cheapside, Croydon Warehouse Theatre, dir. Ted Craig, 1985
- The Mahabharata (as Karna), Festival d'Avignon in France, tour and film, dir. Peter Brook, 1985–89.
- Troilus and Cressida (as Diomedes), Barbican Centre, dir. Howard Davies, 1986
- The Gods Are Not to Blame, Riverside Studios, dir. Yvonne Brewster, 1989
- The Merchant of Venice (as the Prince of Morocco), Phoenix Theatre, dir. Peter Hall, 1989
- As You Like It, Royal Shakespeare Company, dir. Trevor Nunn.
- In the Solitude of Cotton Fields, Almeida Theatre, 1991
- Antony and Cleopatra (as Antony), Merseyside Theatre and Bloomsbury, dir. Yvonne Brewster, 1991
- A Taste of Honey
- The Coup, Royal National Theatre, dir. Mustapha Matura, 1991
- A Midsummer Night's Dream, (as Oberon) Royal National Theatre, dir. Robert Lepage, 1992
- A Midsummer Night's Dream (as Theseus/Oberon), Chichester Festival Theatre, dir. Gail Edwards/Steven Pimlott 1992
- Othello (as Othello), Birmingham Repertory Theatre, dir. Bill Alexander, 1993
- Julius Caesar (as Brutus), Royal Shakespeare Company's The Other Place, video and tour, dir. David Thacker, 1993
- The Tempest (as Prospero), Birmingham Repertory Theatre, dir. Bill Alexander, 1994
- Oedipus the King, Royal National Theatre, dir. Peter Hall, 1996
- The Caucasian Chalk Circle, Royal National Theatre, dir. Simon McBurney, 1997
- Life is a Dream (as Basilio), Edinburgh and London, dir. Calixto Bieito, 1999
- The Dove, Croydon Warehouse Theatre, dir. Jeanette Smith, 1999
- The Free State (as Alexander), tour, dir. Janet Suzman, 2000
- The Tragedy of Hamlet, (as Claudius and Ghost) world tour, dir. Peter Brook, 2001–02
- The Meeting (as Malcolm X), Croydon Warehouse Theatre, dir. Malcolm Fredericks, 2002
- Nathan the Wise, Chichester Festival Theatre, dir. Steven Pimlott, 2003
- Resurrection Lichfield Garrick Theatre, dir. Annie Castledine 2003
- Fix Up by Kwame Kwei-Armah (as Brother Kiyi), Royal National Theatre, dir. Angus Jackson Archived 17 February 2010 at the Wayback Machine 2004
- Henry IV, Parts 1 and 2 (as Earl of Northumberland), Royal National Theatre, dir. Nicholas Hytner, 2005
- Tamburlaine the Great (as Bajazeth), Bristol Old Vic and Barbican Centre, dir. David Farr, 2005
- Orestes (as Tyndareos), Tricycle Theatre and tour, dir. Nancy Meckler, 2007
- An African Cargo by Margaret Busby (as Equiano and Lord Mansfield), Greenwich Theatre, Black Theatre Co-operative (now NitroBeat), dir. Felix Cross, 2007
- War and Peace (as Prince Bolkonsky), Hampstead Theatre and tour, dir. Nancy Meckler, 2008
- Amazonia (as Don Antonio), Young Vic, dir. Paul Heritage/Joe Hill-Gibbins, 2009
- The Meeting (as Malcolm X), Croydon Warehouse Theatre, director Jeffery Kissoon, 2009.
- Antony and Cleopatra (as Antony), Liverpool Playhouse, dir. Janet Suzman, 2010
- Waiting For Godot, West Yorkshire Playhouse, dir. Ian Brown, 2011
- Julius Caesar (as Julius Caesar), Royal Shakespeare Company, dir. Greg Doran, 2012–13

=== Radio ===
- The Ministry of Performing Arts, BBC Sound, Mustapha Matura
- Dionysos, BBC Radio Three, 2003
- The City Speaks: Broken Chain, BBC Radio 4, Toby Swift, 2008
- Rudy's Rare Records (Series 1–3), BBC, Lucy Armitage, 2008
- Tamburlaine: The Shadow of God, BBC, Marc Beeby, 2008
- Broken Chain, Mark Norfolk, 2008
- Gone, BBC Radio 3, debbie tucker green, 2010

=== Film ===
- Carry on Up the Jungle (1970) - Nosher (uncredited)
- Hamlet (1996) - Fortinbras's Captain
- Dirty Pretty Things (2002) - Cab Controller
- The Nativity Story (2006) - Herod's Architect
- Crossing Bridges (2007) - Buster
- Ham and the Piper (2013) - Burt
- Star Wars: The Force Awakens (2015) - Rear Admiral Guich

=== Television ===
- Like You, Like Me (1970)
- Beryl's Lot (1975) - Sam
  - "Devil to Pay"
  - "Safety First"
  - "Home Again"
  - "A Day at the Races"
- Z-Cars (1976, Episode: "Manslaughter") - PC Robbins
- BBC Play for Today (1976, Episode: "Rocky Marciano is Dead") - Sonny
- Space: 1999 (1976–1977) - Dr Ben Vincent
- Very Like a Whale (1981) - Customs Officer
- Grange Hill (1986–1987) - Mr Kennedy
- The Mahabharata (1990) - Karna
- The Bill (1995) - De Silva
  - "Street Life"
  - "Uncle Bob"
- Only Love (1998, TV Movie) - Rashid
- Brothers and Sisters (1998) - Russel Leonard
- The Adventures of Young Indiana Jones (1999, Episode: "Tales of Innocence") - El Hadji
- Dalziel and Pascoe (1999, Episode: "Time to Go") - Mr Graham
- The Tragedy of Hamlet (2002) - Claudius / Ghost
- EastEnders (2002-2016) - Judge Anthony Abego / Milton Hibbert
- Holby City (2002–2018)
  - "Last Chances" (2002) - Douglas Payne
  - "Bad Blood" (2006) - Trevor Heron
  - "Last Dance" (2013) - Professor JJ Kirby
  - "The Three Musketeers" (2018) - Reg Thompson
- Doctors (2003, Episode: "A Question of Priorities") - Lewis Parnell
- Grease Monkeys (2004, Episode: "Jail Bait") - Bertrand Baptiste
- Agatha Christie's Marple (2006: "The Sittaford Mystery") - Ahmed Ghali
- Kiss of Death (2008) - Commissioner
- Casualty (2008, Episode: "Before a Fall") - Lyndon Marshall
- Doctors (2010) - Denny
