= Sarah Williams (screenwriter) =

British producer and screenwriter

- Occupations: Producer, screenwriter
- Years active: 1991–present
- Known for: Wallis & Edward, Becoming Jane

Sarah Williams is a British producer and screenwriter perhaps best known for writing the scripts to the 2005 television film Wallis & Edward and co-writing the 2007 feature film Becoming Jane. For her work adapting the novels Poppy Shakespeare and Small Island for television, Williams received two Writers' Guild of Great Britain Award nominations.

== Career ==
In 1992 Williams produced a series of documentary films for the BBC and Showtime USA Funny Business, which starred Rowan Atkinson, John Cleese, Roseanne Barr and Bill Hicks. Williams worked as a co-producer in the film Up on the Roof in 1997, and the following year was a producer for the 1998 television film Jack and the Beanstalk starring Paul Merton. She also produced the wildlife documentary 'Operation Lemur" starring John Cleese, for which she was nominated for a BAFTA award.

The first authorial credit of Williams was the 2005 ITV television production Wallis & Edward, starring Joely Richardson. Williams then wrote The Secret Life of Mrs. Beeton for BBC2, which came out in 2006. After reading in 2004 Becoming Jane Austen, a 2003 biography by Jon Hunter Spence, Williams approached Ecosse Films about the possibility of adapting it into a film about Austen's early life. The resulting film, Becoming Jane, starring Anne Hathaway and James McAvoy was released in 2007.

Williams was the screenwriter for the 2007 docudrama, Sinking of the Lusitania: Terror at Sea. The following year, Williams adapted the novel Poppy Shakespeare starring Anna Maxwell Martin and Naomie Harris for Channel Four television. The Guardian called her script an example of "good art," and she received a nomination for Best Television Short-Form Drama at the 2009 Writers' Guild of Great Britain Awards. In 2009, Williams co-wrote the two-part television drama based on Andrea Levy's novel Small Island. It also received a nomination for Best Television Short-Form Drama, this time at the 2010 Writers' Guild of Great Britain Awards. Williams adapted a novel by Sophie Hannah into the 2012 two-part series Case Sensitive, starring Olivia Williams.

In 2018 Williams wrote the three-part BBC TV series The Long Song, based on the novel by Andrea Levy, starring Tamara Lawrance, Hayley Atwell and Sir Lenny Henry.

In 2019 she wrote a four-part original drama series FLESH AND BLOOD for ITV starring Imelda Staunton, Francesca Annis, Russell Tovey and Stephen Rea, broadcast in February 2020.

In 2020 she began work on a six part series about the Mitford sisters, OUTRAGEOUS, which aired on UKTV, Britbox and BBC i-player in 2025, starring Bessie Carter, Joanna Vanderham, James Purefoy and Anna Chancellor.
