= Anne Brydges Lefroy =

English writer

Anne Brydges Lefroy (1747/8–1804) was an English writer. She wrote both prose and verse, some of which was published anonymously in her lifetime. Four years after Lefroy died, her friend Jane Austen wrote a poem lamenting her death.

== Early life ==
Anne was the eldest child of Edward Brydges (d. 1780) of Wootton Court, Wootton, Kent, and his wife Jemima, née Egerton, daughter of the Reverend William Egerton of Penshurst, also in Kent. Her parents were married in about 1745. Edward Brydges worked in family businesses in Canterbury, co-inheriting Wootton Court in 1712 with his brother John. Anne was born probably in 1747, and was followed by Edward Timewell (or Tymewell) in 1749; Jane in 1750; John in 1752 (died in infancy); Deborah in 1755; John Egerton in 1758 (died in infancy); Charlotte Jemima, known as Jemima, in 1759; Samuel Egerton in 1762; John William Head in 1764; and Charlotte in 1766.

Anne's brother Samuel was later to write about his sister: 'My eldest sister was fourteen years and a half older than me: she had an exquisite taste for poetry, and could almost repeat the chief English poets by heart, especially Milton, Pope, Collins, Gray, and the poetical passages of Shakespeare; and she composed easy verses herself with great facility.'

As a young woman, Anne's occupations were reading, writing, and helping to educate her younger siblings. During the winter, the young Brydges would attend parties, dances and assemblies held in Canterbury. Anne wrote a number of poems for her siblings, several of which were collected after her death and published in a private edition by her son Christopher Edward in 1812.

== Marriage ==
Probably through her brothers who attended The King's School in Canterbury, Anne met Isaac Peter George Lefroy (1745–1806), who with his brother Anthony also attended the school. The Lefroy boys were the sons of marble merchant Anthony Lefroy of Livorno, Italy (d. 1779), who amassed a vast collection of ancient coins, marble sculptures and other antiquities.

Isaac Peter George (known as George) and his brother Anthony travelled from Livorno to attend The King's School. George then attended Oxford, attaining a fellowship at All Souls through family connections. He took orders in 1772. An early clerical appointment was as domestic chaplain to Amelia D'Arcy, Baroness Conyers and Marchioness of Carmarthen (1754–1784). He left this position to marry Anne Brydges on 28 December 1778 at Wootton.

== Married life ==
The Lefroys lived for a time in London, then moved to Basingstoke, where their first child, Jemima Lucy (always known as Lucy) was christened in December 1779. Two children died in infancy (John Henry George, Julia Elizabeth), and a son Anthony Brydges was born in the early 1780s. In 1783 George and Anne moved into the Rectory at Ashe, Hampshire, which George Lefroy's maternal uncle, Benjamin Langlois, had purchased some years prior.

Anne took part in a range of activities in the local community. In 1787, she was invited to take part in family theatricals, a performance of the play The Tragedy of Jane Shore by Nicholas Rowe, by her friend Katherine Powlett, Duchess of Bolton, of Hackwood Park. Anne declined the invitation via a poem:

ALL to the task unused my faultering tongue,
Would mar the tuneful strains that Rowe has sung.
Can I, a wife, a mother, tread the stage?
Burn with false fire, and glow with mimic rage?...

The lead role in the Hackwood play was performed by Richard Barry, seventh Earl of Barrymore (1769–1793), not quite seventeen. His sister Lady Caroline Barry played the part of Jane Shore. Lady Bolton was a patron of the young earl, sharing his passion for horse-racing and the theatre.

Despite declining the invitation to perform, Anne remained friends with the Boltons, and with their successors at Hackwood Park. Anne's letters, written mostly to her son Christopher Edward (1785–1856) in the period 1800–1804, depict a lively social life with many engagements. The family of Jane Austen lived in the neighbouring parish of Steventon, and the Lefroy and Austen families were close.

Anne continued to write occasional verse and prose. At least two of her prose articles appear to have been published anonymously in the Gentleman's Magazine. One, with a natural history focus, described a cross-species relationship between a maternal cat and a juvenile squirrel. The other offered an interpretation of a contested passage in the Book of Daniel (Daniel 7:8), with reference to current events in Europe.

== Children ==
The children of Anne and George who survived infancy were: the Reverend (John Henry) George (d. 1823), who married Sophia Cottrell, leaving issue; (Jemima) Lucy] (1779–1862), who married the Reverend Henry Rice in 1801, leaving issue; Anthony Brydges (d. 1800), who died in his teens as a result of a fall from a horse; Christopher Edward (1785–1856), who died unmarried; and the Reverend Benjamin (1791–1829), who in 1814 married Anna Austen (1793–1872, a niece of Jane Austen, being the elder daughter of Reverend James Austen by his first marriage), leaving issue.

== Health, school, volunteers ==
As the wife of the Rector of Ashe, Anne was expected to take the lead in promoting the education of parish children. This she did through setting up a Sunday school, where she taught village children the basics of reading, writing, Scripture and useful skills such as knitting and sewing. The Reverend George gave more specialised doctrinal tuition to students approaching confirmation in the church.

Shortly after Edward Jenner developed a cowpox vaccine for smallpox, Anne received 'vaccine material' from him, and, along with neighbours such as Wither Bramston, used it, each winter, in a program of vaccinating people in the surrounding areas. She wrote to Christopher Edward in February 1803:

I am now again very busy in Cowpox inoculation as the Smallpox is in many of the Villages around us the common people are all now eager to be secured from infection. Mr Bramston inoculated 140 in one day & numbers of those whom I inoculated last year & the year before have been employed in attending their neighbours who have the Smallpox & not one has had the least symptom of having taken the infection.

Anne also became involved in the community effort which was galvanised in the period 1803–4, as people in southern England expected Napoleon Bonaparte to launch a naval invasion of the British mainland. Volunteer units of militia were formed, including in Ashe. Anne sewed 'colours' (flags) and prepared versions of patriotic songs. She even suggested that she would operate a musket if England were to be attacked:

I think I could handle Cartridges if not fire a musket myself upon such an occasion...

== Friendship with Jane Austen ==
When the Lefroys moved into the Rectory at Ashe, the Austens had been settled at neighbouring Steventon for some years.

When Jane Austen was about twenty, she seems to have met and fallen in love with the Reverend George Lefroy's nephew Tom Lefroy (1776–1869), who was visiting from Ireland. Over the winter of 1796–97 they met at dances and at the Lefroy and Austen residences. It was conjectured by the late Jon Spence (in his Becoming Jane Austen, 2003) that Anne had promoted a relationship between Jane and Tom. However, this seems less likely than the view put forward by Hazel Jones, in Jane Austen and Marriage (2009), that Anne and George, having taken steps to send Tom away to London, were nonetheless disappointed that Tom had encouraged feelings in Jane which he was not in a position to follow with a proposal.

Anne's friendship with Jane and several of the Austens continued but does not appear to have been particularly close. Yet Jane Austen's poetic lament for Anne (1808) suggests that Anne had taken particular notice of her as a girl ('her partial favour from my earliest years'). It is possible that Anne encouraged young Jane in writing her brilliant juvenilia, although there is no direct evidence about this.

== Death ==
On 16 December 1804 (Jane Austen's birthday), Anne died some hours after falling heavily from a bolting horse. She was buried on 21 December, with Jane's brother the Reverend James Austen (1765–1819) of Steventon conducting the service.

Anne's brother Samuel wrote a lengthy obituary which appeared in several outlets, including the Gentleman's Magazine for December 1804. He wrote:

To do justice to the character of Mrs L[efroy] would require a command of glowing and pathetic expression far beyond the powers of the writer of this article. She was alike the delight of the old and the young, of the lively and of the severe, the rich and the poor. She received from Nature an intellectual capacity of the highest order; her perceptions were rapid; her memory was tenacious; her comprehension was extensive; her fancy was splendid; her sentiments were full of tenderness; and her language was easy, copious, and energetic...

Four years later, Jane Austen wrote her tribute to Anne Lefroy, which was circulated in the Austen and Lefroy families, eventually to be published in Sir John Henry Lefroy's work of family history (1868) and in James Edward Austen-Leigh's Memoir of Jane Austen (1869). The poem expresses a depth of emotion which is found nowhere else in Jane Austen's letters and verse.

The day returns again, my natal day;
What mix'd emotions with the Thought arise!
Beloved friend, four years have pass'd away
Since thou were snatch'd forever from our eyes...
