= Warehouse Theatre =

Former theatre in London

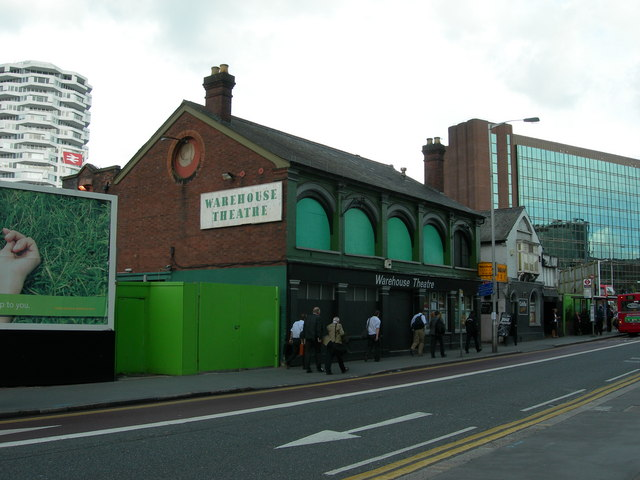
- Warehouse Theatre in 2007
- Interactive map of Warehouse Theatre
- Address: Dingwall Road, Croydon, CR0 2NF; Croydon, London; United Kingdom
- Coordinates: 51.3749°N 0.0938°W
- Owner: Warehouse Theatre Company Ltd
- Capacity: 100
- Current use: Theatre performances

Construction
- Opened: 1977
- Closed: 2012
- Rebuilt: 2016
- Years active: 31

Website
- www.warehousetheatre.co.uk

The Warehouse Theatre was a professional producing theatre in the centre of Croydon, England. Based in an oak-beamed Victorian former cement warehouse, it had 100 seats. The theatre closed in 2012 following withdrawal of funding and the discovery, after a survey, of serious faults in the building.

The Warehouse was known for its commitment to new writing, including an annual International Playwriting Festival, in partnership with the Extra Candoni Festival of Udine in Italy and Theatro Ena in Cyprus. Youth theatre was also an important feature of the theatre, with a resident Croydon Young Peoples' Theatre (CRYPT) and including an annual collaboration with the Croydon-based Brit School.

== History ==
The Warehouse Theatre was founded by Sam Kelly, Richard Ireson and Adrian Shergold when lunchtime theatre was particularly popular, with the aim of presenting a varied season of plays with an emphasis on new work to the highest possible standards. The first production — Hell's Angels on Typewriters by Angela Wye — opened in May 1977, and the then-50-seat auditorium became an instant favourite with local audiences for lunchtime performances whilst sharing the building with a Caribbean night club.

In 1978, the Arts Council recognised the work of the theatre by awarding a major grant, and in 1979 the nightclub closed, evening performances were introduced and the seating capacity was increased to 100. Respected touring companies began to visit the theatre between in-house productions. Cabaret evenings were introduced, with performers including Lenny Henry, French & Saunders, Rik Mayall, Ben Elton, and Julian Clary. Gradually more plays were premiered, with many being specially commissioned by successful writers, such as Sue Townsend, who wrote Groping for Words and Womberang for the theatre.

After the withdrawal of an Arts Council grant in 1984, potential closure was averted when the London Borough of Croydon and the GLC agreed to replace the grant. Following a brief closure for major refurbishment, including the building of the bar, the theatre re-opened in 1985 under the directorship of Ted Craig with the premiere of David Allen's Cheapside. Now concentrating exclusively on new playwriting, initiatives such as the South London Playwriting Festival were launched, giving an invaluable platform to works by both new and established writers. Kevin Hood's new play Beached won the first festival in 1986 and he later became Resident Playwright, writing both The Astronomer's Garden and Sugar Hill Blues for the theatre.

The building was demolished on 26/27 October 2013.

== International Playwriting Festival ==
The South London Playwriting Festival quickly became the International Playwriting Festival, reflecting the number of entries from all over the globe. Finalists included playwrights from the United States, Trinidad and Tobago, Australia and Bulgaria, with the 1994 winner, Dino Mahoney, being half Irish, half Greek, living in Hong Kong. Mahoney's selected play Yo Yo had its premiere in April 1995. In 1996, the Warehouse Theatre inaugurated a partnership with the leading Italian playwriting festival, the Premio Candoni Arta Terme and in 1999 a partnership was also formed with Theatro Ena in Cyprus providing selected writers with a window for further productions in Europe. The new writers discovered by the festival, including James Martin Charlton, Sheila Dewey, Richard Vincent, Mark Norfolk, Maggie Nevill and Roumen Shomov have gone on to further productions, radio and screen contracts.

== The building ==
The Warehouse Theatre was a converted Victorian warehouse, built in 1882 for a sand, cement and lime merchant. In spite of refurbishments, it still had several original features. There were picture tiles from the 1880s, mostly on the cellar under the main staircase, and a "crab" winch and wall crane of unusual design in full working order on the side of the building. Early drawings show that the bar, opened in 1985, was actually sited in the old stable block, with the eating area above in the appropriately named "Hayloft" bar. The Victorian origin of the building also had negative sides: the removal of a false ceiling in 1981 uncovered the planked roof and vast beams and tresses of the original holes in the original roof to let in the rain over audience and cast alike.

== Ruskin Square development ==
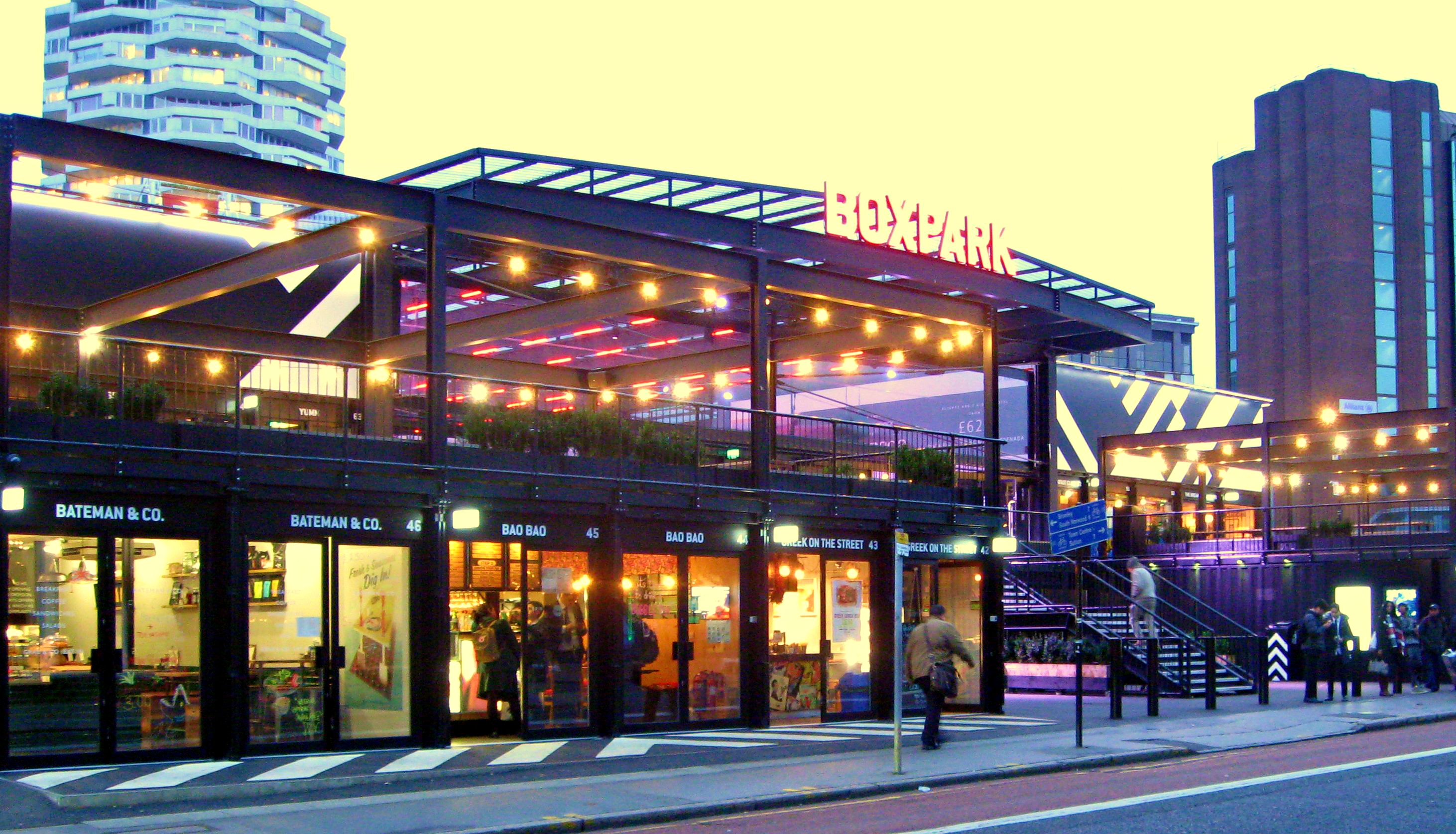
Boxpark, Croydon in November 2017

For some years a new theatre has been planned in partnership with Stanhope / Schroders as part of their Ruskin Square development. Designed by Foster + Partners around a park setting with the Warehouse Theatre occupying a £5 million, 200 seat custom designed building. Although a complete contrast to the existing Victorian warehouse, the new building has been designed to be as intimate as possible.

As part of the redevelopment, a Boxpark retail park was opened on the site in October 2016.

== Croydon Arena scheme ==
Croydon Arena was a proposed arena part of the Croydon Gateway re-generation scheme in the south London district of Croydon. The site is next to East Croydon station and was in the ownership of the rival development, Ruskin Square. The Arena scheme was backed by Croydon Council with developer partner Arrowcroft. The matter was the subject of a public inquiry that took place from September to November 2007. The full decision rejecting the Planning Application and the Compulsory Purchase Order was issued on the 31 July 2008 and 6 August 2008.

== Administration and Warehouse Phoenix ==
On 4 May 2012 the Warehouse was placed into administration by the board of management, with debts of £100,000, following Croydon Council's decision to withdraw funding. The last performance was on 20 May, at the end of the run of Call Mr Robeson. A fund-raising appeal was launched to try and save the company. A new company Warehouse Phoenix Limited was formed to continue the work of the theatre. It produced the annual International Playwriting Festival in June 2013 and a production of the selected play from the Festival The Road to Nowhere by Sean Cook was produced at the Ashcroft Theatre in Croydon in October 2013.
