= Mark Norfolk =

British writer and filmmaker

Mark Norfolk is a British prolific author and independent filmmaker. He has made documentaries, short films and feature films and authored plays for stage and radio and well as publishing several books.

== Early life and career ==
Born in London, Mark Norfolk studied Independent Film at the University of Wales, Cardiff and has worked as an actor, reporter and sports journalist.

Norfolk noticed while growing up that the voices of black characters in plays and TV shows were never really authentic, "That takes away a large part of what they are: they're just doing what the majority of society has given them to do. What that's done over the years is made black people lose any representation of themselves. So it's very important that people are now trying to use language as it is said." The continuing themes in his writing bring a sharp focus on contemporary British society and how the various groups and generations interlock or collide.

Mark Norfolk's theatre debut came in 1998 when as part of Black History Month his play, Fair As The Dark Get, was staged at the Albany Theatre, and closely followed by Buy Your Leave the next year.

He then wrote and directed Diary Of Somebody (2000), a short film which won an LFVDA Production Award (London Film & Video Development Agency) and followed that with a low budget, digital feature film Love Is Not Enough which premiered on 10 September 2001 to a sold-out audience at the Curzon Soho Cinema, London as part of the BFM International Film Festival. Time Out film critic Tom Charity wrote "You could call it an avant garde deconstruction of independent film practice and process – or you could call it a piss-take. It's a shambles, but engagingly so. I laughed lots." ITV's popular film show, Movie Nights called it "a highlight of the festival". In 2002 Love is Not Enough opened at the same cinema.

Norfolk's play, Knock Down Ginger was produced at the Warehouse Theatre after being selected for its International Playwriting Festival in June 2002. The play was nominated for the Arts Council's Eclipse Award For Combating Racism Through Theatre and was shortlisted for the Verity Bargate playwriting award, later the same year it was staged in Urbino, Italy, opening the Premio Candoni Festival of New Writing and won a Croydon Guardian Culture Award. The play, directed by Jeffery Kissoon, starred Judith Jacob, Sylvester Williams and marked the stage debut for Troy Glasgow.

In 2002 he took part in the Soho Theatre Writers' Attachment Programme where he developed Wrong Place. The play went into production directed by artistic director, Abigail Morris and featuring Mark Theodore, Larrington Walker and Geoffrey Burton, at the Soho Theatre the following year. 2003 also saw the start of an ongoing film and theatre collaboration with actor and director, Jeffery Kissoon with whom he later worked, most notably on Naked Soldiers (2010) featuring Ewart James Walters, Adam Sopp and Elisabeth Dahl at the Warehouse Theatre; and the next year Where The Flowers Grow (2011), featuring Ashley Gerlach and Jodie Richardson.

In 2013 Norfolk was a co-writer of Blair's Children at the Cockpit Theatre with April De Angelis, Anders Lustgarten, Georgia Fitch and Paula B. Stanic. In 2016, Norfolk worked with Jeffery Kissoon on adapting William Shakespeare's Hamlet for the first ever all-black cast of the play in the UK which toured nationally for Black Theatre Live. The production was also noted for having an all-black creative team. In the same year Mark adapted Hamlet for an Albanian language contemporary version titled Princi I, that he also directed at the Dodona Theatre in Pristina, Kosovo.

Norfolk's collaboration with Jeffery Kissoon escalated when, as Kazimba Theatre, they staged his play Dare To Do (The Bear Maxim) based on Kweku Adoboli the 'rogue banker' who was convicted of perpetrating the then, largest trading loss in British banking history'. The production, staged at The Space, a venue literally under the shadow of the banking industry on the Isle of Dogs in east London, was notable for its use of non-binary casting when former backing vocalist and singer, Jaye Ella-Ruth took the title role and when Adoboli took part in an after-show question and answer session in the midst of his own personal deportation battle with the UK government. Rehearsals for Dare To Do took place in Bay 56, a unit within the Village off Portobello Market, West London, a space occupied by the local community in response to the Grenfell Tower fire tragedy. This association with Portobello Road ignited a relationship with The Muse Gallery in Portobello Road where Kissoon and Norfolk under the Kazimba Theatre banner would produce regular readings of new plays including The Misclarification Of Sulieman Dewani, Dinner For Bono, What A' Fe Yu written by Mark Norfolk; and Birdbath by Leonard Melfi. Mark Norfolk's plays are published by Oberon Books and more recently Aurora Metro Publishing.

Norfolk has also written a number of productions for broadcast on BBC Radio, including In The Car Park (2002), Medium Risk (2005), and, paradoxically, a radio film called Broken Chain (2008). for Radio 4's The City Speaks.

Norfolk's first 35mm film, Crossing Bridges, started production in 2004 after the script won £1000 in a competition. Without even a fraction of the £150,000 budget, Norfolk proved to be a tenacious and resourceful independent filmmaker. He launched into production, gathering investors as the project progressed. Crossing Bridges tells the story of a suicidal man who meets an angel and features Jason Rose, Jeffery Kissoon and Elisabeth Dahl and went on to win an armful of international awards. Crossing Bridges, 2006 was distributed worldwide by Echelon Entertainment and a Winner of the Audience Award – Corinthian International Film Festival 2008, Winner of Independent Spirit Award-Screen Nation Film & Television Awards 2007, Winner of Cyprus International Film Festival – Best Editing 2007, Official Selection - London UK Film Focus, (LUFF) 2007 and European Independent Film Festival 2007

Mark Norfolk's 2012 film, Ham and the Piper features Jeffery Kissoon in the lead role alongside Jennifer Guy and has since won a host of awards including SevenArt Best Film and Best Leading Actor at the Peloponnesian International Film Festival, Best Feature Film at the Carmarthen Bay International Film Festival, Best Film/Video at the Black International Cinema Festival and a Silver Chris Award at the Columbus International Film Festival.

His experimental art genre movie, Shadow Gene starring Elisabeth Dahl and Riley Stewart was completed in 2014 and had a preview screening at the Venice Experimental Cinema and Performance Festival before winning Best Actress and Best Editing at the Peloponnesian International Film Festival. The film's narrative follows a female assassin on a mission to destroy men with a degenerative gene and was shot entirely on discarded Super 8 and 16mm film stocks along with hand-drawn animation, still photographs and a soundtrack by brilliant young composer, Nedyalka Dimitrova. In June 2015, Shadow Gene won Best Film, Best Director and Best Actress at Festfilm Kosova in Prishtina and later that year won Best Actress and Best Editing at the Peloponnesian International Film Festival, Greece.

Norfolk's next film was I, Father (Un 'Ati) in 2018, an extremely low budget adaptation of his Kosovan play, Princi I produced by Filma-KS and Prussia Lane Productions. Photography was completed in just over four days and the film has since picked up a number of awards at international film festivals.

Norfolk was Writer In Residence at HMP High Down, a London prison working with the Writers in Prison Network, supported by Arts Council England and the Learning and Skills Council for over six years, publishing several books and was the first ever Writer in Residence for the London Borough of Newham in an ambitious collaboration between creative writing agency, Spread the Word, Arts Council England and Newham Council where he established its first borough-wide inclusive creative writing competition, Changing Face and worked with elderly residents on a project called A Picture Paints A Thousand Words. Norfolk is the inaugural recipient of the Roland Rees Bursary in honour of the late theatre director who died in September 2015. He is a former Writer in Residence at Kingston University Writing School and a former associate Lecturer in Screenwriting at Birkbeck University, London.

== Works ==
Source: various databases:

=== Stage plays ===
• Dare To Do: The Bear Maxim – Space Arts Centre, 2018

• Princi I – Dodona Theatre, Pristina, Kosovo, 2016

• Hamlet (adaptation) – Black Theatre Live! National Tour, 2016

• Blair's Children – Cockpit Theatre, 2013

• Where The Flowers Grow – Warehouse Theatre, 2011

• Naked Soldiers – Warehouse Theatre May, 2010

• A Walk In The Park – Talawa Theatre Co. short play commission 25th anniversary celebration, Soho Theatre & writers’ Centre, 2007

• Dear Mama – Pascal Theatre Co. short play commission. Swiss Cottage Library, 2005

• Dinner with Bono – Inaugural Flight 5065 London Eye, short play commission, 2005 (based on the short story by Jackee Butesta Batanda)

• Fess Up – Menagerie Theatre commission, Eastern Pipeline Project, 2004

• Wrong Place – Soho Theatre commission, 2003

• Knock Down Ginger – Produced Warehouse Theatre, winner Guardian Culture Award 2003

• Fair As The Dark Gets – Albany Theatre-Black History Month, 1998

• Buy Your Leave -Albany Theatre-Black History Month, 1998

=== Radio ===
• The City Speaks Broken Chain – BBC Radio 4/Film London/Arts Council England, broadcast on radio and screened in UK cinemas nationally, 2008

• Medium Risk – BBC Radio 3/7 TX: July 2005

• In The Car Park – BBC, Sparks, 2002

=== Screenplays include ===
• Waiting In The City, ZDF, Germany.

• Bagman Taps 1998; Shortlisted Orange/Pathe Screenwriting Award, 2000, Moonstone International 2002

• A King in his Kingdom Finalist Script City Focus on Talent 1998

=== Feature films written and directed ===
• I, Father (Un'Ati) (2018), Best Psychological Drama -Eurocinema Festival, Geneva; Best Experimental Film - World Film Fair, LA; Best Screenplay, Best Director of a film in a foreign language - World Cinema Festival, Milan; Best Actress, Best Supporting Actor of a Film in a Foreign Language - London International Filmmakers Festival

• Shadow Gene (2015), Best Film, Best Director, Best Actress - Festfilm Kosovo (Hynesh Ne Fron) 2015, Best Actress, Best Editing - Peloponnesian International Film Festival 2014, Official Selection - Venice Experimental Cinema and Performance Art Festival

• Ham & The Piper (2011), (Distributed in US by Striped Entertainment) Winner Best Film – SevenArt 2012, Best Lead Actor – Peloponnesian International Film Festival 2012, Best Feature Film – Carmarthen Bay International Film Festival 2012, Best Film/Video – Black International Cinema 2012

• Crossing Bridges (2006), (Distributed worldwide by Echelon Entertainment) Winner Audience Award – Corinthian International Film Festival 2008, Winner Independent Spirit Award-Screen Nation Film & Television Awards 2007, Winner Cyprus International Film Festival – Best Editing 2007, Official Selection London UK Film Focus 2007 and European Independent Film Festival 2007

• How Do You Sleep at Night? an essay film, 2018

• Mothers And Daughters A Jewish Archive, 2006 Creative Director-[50 x 120 mins Video archive. Pascal Theatre co/Heritage lottery Fund]

• Love Is Not Enough, 2001 (Distributed worldwide by Frontier Media Corp. US)

=== Short films include ===
• Anonymity, 20 mins, 2008, Finalist World Peace Film Festival, Italy 2008; Access & Paradox Art Fair, Paris 2010; Distributed by Tribeca Film Institute Reframe Collection in association with Nomad Films

• Vengeance By Proxy, 15 mins, 2005

• The Slimes, (Commission-Southwark Environmental Services) 2003

• The Grimes, 2000 (Commission-Lewisham Environmental Services. Winner "Tidy Britain" Campaign Award 2000)

• Diary of Somebody", 8 mins, 2000 (Winner LFVDA & Wandsworth Arts Short Production Award 1999, BFM International Film Festival 2001, Le Mans International Film festival, 2001; XXIII Grenzland International Film Festival; Greenwich Film Festival 2000; Chichester Film Festival; Portobello Film Festival; 5th Bite The Mango Film Festival-NMPFT, Bradford; Foyle Film Festival, N.I; Manchester Intl. Film Festival; Nubian Tales, London; XV Brest Intl. Short Film Festival, Wandsworth Film Festival).

• Vegetaria, 10 mins, 1998 (Direction Film Club, Belfast, 2000; Raindance Film Festival, 1999; XIV Black International Cinema Festival, Berlin 1999; Truly Madly Cheaply Film Showcase, London, 1998)

• Rage, 5 mins, 1997

• Miltroed I Ffwrdd, 1997(Commission-Pop video broadcast "GAREG", S4C 1997)

• Miles Away, 1997 (Music video-Music Box)

• Nation, 15 mins, 1996
