= International Playwriting Festival =

Theatre festival in Croydon, London

The International Playwriting Festival (IPF) is an annual theatre festival in London, United Kingdom.

== History and operations ==
The IPF was founded in 1986 by Steve Gooch and Ted Craig and was hosted by the Warehouse Theatre, a producing theatre in Croydon, South London, until the Warehouse Theater Company Limited went into administration in May 2012. The IPF acted to ensure its reputation and continuation and is now under the umbrella of a new company, Warehouse Phoenix Limited.

The IPF is held in two parts: the first is a competition with entries accepted from all over the world, which are judged by a panel of distinguished theater practitioners. The second is a celebration and a showcase of the selected plays, which is performed the following May.

The IPF has two international partners – Extra Candoni, Udine, Italy; and Theatro Ena, Nicosia, Cyprus, representing Italian and Greek new writing. There are also contributions from students from the BRIT School, a performing arts and technology secondary school in Croydon. "Doing playwrights and the theatre at large a fine service". Jeremy Kingston, The Times 1990.

The 2013 IPF was held at Fairfield Halls in Croydon, on 29 and 30 June 2013, and the selected play, The Road to Nowhere by Sean Cook, was given a full production at the Ashcroft Theatre, a theatre within Fairfield Halls, from 2 to 5 October 2013.

Writers discovered by the IPF include:

- Mark Norfolk – His debut play, Knock Down Ginger, was produced at the Warehouse Theatre in June 2002 (the education project attached to the play was nominated for the Arts Council England’s Eclipse award for combating racism through theatre). Knock Down Ginger was also showcased in Urbino, Italy, the same year. His second play, Wrong Place, was produced by the Soho Theatre in October 2003.
- Maggie Nevill – The Shagaround was premièred at the Premio Candoni Arta Terme in 2001 and co-produced by the Warehouse Theater Company and the Nuffield Theatre, Southampton, playing at the Nuffield Theatre, the Ashcroft Theatre, the Soho Theatre and the Theatre Royal, Brighton.
- Roumen Shomov – The Dove was premièred at the Warehouse Theatre in April 2000 and was also showcased at the Premio Candoni Arta Terme in the same year. It went on to be produced in Bulgaria at The State Theatre in Yambol, and the Satirical Theatre in Sofia.
- Dominic McHale – The Resurrectionists was co-produced by the Octagon Theatre in Bolton (Greater Manchester) and the Warehouse Theater in 1998.
- Richard Vincent – Real Estate was produced in Italy by Il Centro per la Drammaturgia Contemporanea 'H' in December 1999, Quartieri dell'Arte and Festival delle Ville Tuscolane in July 2001 and Teatro Colosseo in December 2001 and has since been developed as a screenplay. Skin Deep was produced at the Warehouse Theatre in May 2002. He has since written for the BBC's medical drama series Casualty and several screenplays for the Film Council.
- Kevin Hood (Silent Witness, a crime-drama television series; and the 2007 biographical romantic drama film Becoming Jane).
- Guy Jenkin (Drop the Dead Donkey, a television sitcom)
- Peter Moffat (North Square and Cambridge Spies, both drama television series)

The festival's patron is Thelma Holt CBE.

== See also ==
- List of festivals in the United Kingdom
- List of theatre festivals
- Theatre in London
