= Conor Lennon =

British broadcaster

- Education: University of Hull; London College of Communication
- Occupation: Senior broadcast journalist
- Notable work: The City Speaks
- Spouse: Karine Lennon
- Website: conorlennon.com

Conor Lennon is a British-Irish audio-visual communications professional and senior broadcast journalist for all Solar Impulse missions.

== Education ==
Lennon studied French language, literature and society at the University of Hull from September 1992 to July 1996 achieving a Bachelor with Honours degree in French Studies. In 2002, he was awarded a Post-Graduate Diploma in Broadcast Journalism from the London College of Communication.

== British Broadcasting Corporation ==
From June 2004 until October 2007 Lennon was Radio Drama Producer for Special Projects at BBC. He was tasked with creating new forms of audio-visual and online content in association with the Arts Council and Film London and collaborations with European broadcasters, won a European Broadcasting Union (EBU) competition to create and execute a collaborative drama project and developed outreach projects in schools and community organisations through setting up a collaborative creative audio portal for students. He has created and overseen the multi-platform BBC project The City Speaks together with composer David Pickvance and sound designer Pete Ringrose.

== Swiss Broadcasting Corporation ==
After leaving the BBC, he was producer, journalist, programme presenter part of the launch team at World Radio Switzerland, an English-language public-service radio station, until January 2011. Themes he reported on included technology, international affairs, business, arts, culture and politics. By creating a magazine-style daily radio show called The Wrap, which generated positive listener feedback, and producing and presenting live outside broadcasts in all regions of Switzerland, he developed the profile of the radio station.

== Off-Piste Radio Network ==
In 2011, Conor and Karine Lennon founded Off-Piste Radio Network, which runs three anglophone radio stations in the French-speaking alpine ski resorts Chamonix, Verbier and Crans-Montana. So called Mountain Radio Verbier is Switzerland’s first tourist radio station.

== Solar Impulse ==
From 2012 on Conor Lennon is senior broadcast journalist for Solar Impulse, a pioneering Swiss project to fly a long-range solar-powered aircraft around the world. He currently presents all the live TV coverage for the circumnavigation flight around the world of the Solar Impulse 2 based principally in the Mission Control Centre (MCC) in Monaco.
