= Wallis & Edward =

2005 British TV biopic drama

- DVD cover
- Written by: Sarah Williams
- Directed by: Dave Moore
- Starring: Joely Richardson; Steven Campbell Moore
- Music by: John E. Keane
- Country of origin: United Kingdom
- Original language: English

Production
- Producer: Mark Pybus
- Cinematography: Mike Eley
- Editor: Melanie Viner-Cuneo
- Running time: 94 minutes
- Production company: Company Pictures

Original release
- Network: ITV
- Release: 18 December 2005

Wallis & Edward (in Canada also known as Her Royal Affair) is a 2005 British television film, scripted by Sarah Williams, dramatising the events of the Edward VIII abdication crisis. It was billed as the first scripted account of the romance between Wallis Simpson and King Edward VIII to view events from Wallis Simpson's point of view. Joely Richardson played Wallis, and Steven Campbell Moore played Edward.

== Cast ==
- Joely Richardson – Wallis Simpson
- Steven Campbell Moore – Edward VIII
- David Westhead – Ernest Simpson, Wallis's second husband
- Richard Johnson – Prime Minister Stanley Baldwin
- Clifford Rose – George V, Edward's father
- Margaret Tyzack – Mary of Teck, Edward's mother
- Bill Champion – George VI, Edward's brother
- Monica Dolan – Elizabeth Bowes-Lyon, Edward's sister-in-law
- David Calder – Winston Churchill
- Miriam Margolyes – Bessie Merryman, Wallis' aunt
- Julian Wadham – Alec Hardinge
- Lisa Kay – Mary Raffray, Ernest Simpson's wife after Wallis
- Helena Michell – Thelma Furness, Edward's love interest before Wallis
- Simon Hepworth – "Perry" Brownlow, equerry to Edward
- Debora Weston – Katherine "Kitty" Rogers, friend of Wallis
- Mykolas Dorofejus – Herman Rogers, friend of Wallis

== See also ==
- Bertie and Elizabeth
