= In a Land of Plenty =

- VHS release cover for 'In A Land Of Plenty'
- Genre: Family saga
- Directed by: Hettie MacDonald; David Moore
- Starring: Robert Pugh; Helen McCrory; Shaun Dingwall; Kaye Wragg; Hazel Monaghan; Stuart Laing; Tony Maudsley; Sian Reeves; Susannah Wise; Lorraine Ashbourne; Charlotte Salt; Indira Varma; Ravi Kapoor
- Composer: Jocelyn Pook
- No. of seasons: 1
- No. of episodes: 10

Original release
- Network: BBC 2
- Release: 10 January – 14 March 2001

In a Land of Plenty is a 10-episode British television drama serial first broadcast in the United Kingdom in 2001.

Adapted for television by Kevin Hood and Neil Biswas from the novel by Tim Pears, the story describes a sprawling family saga taking place from the 1950s to the 1990s in England. Through the lives, deaths, tragedies and loves of the Freeman family, the series charts how Britain was shaped after World War II.

The show was co-financed between WGBH-TV and the BBC and was produced by British producer Michael Riley and John Chapman. Executive producers were Peter Fincham and Tessa Ross. The series was produced by Sterling Pictures and Talkback for BBC Two in the United Kingdom. The soundtrack was written by composer and musician Jocelyn Pook.

In a Land of Plenty was broadcast from 10 January 2001 on BBC in the UK, and was subsequently broadcast in the US on BBC America.

== Critical reception ==
In a Land of Plenty won critical acclaim. The Guardian described it as "stunning", The Sunday Times deemed it "One of the most acclaimed television series of all time", The Observer called it "the most ambitious television drama since Our Friends in the North", The Times stated it had "a richness of tone and texture all of its own – qualities you associate more with music and painting than with television".
