= Richard Vincent (playwright) =

- Born: 9 March 1969 (age 57)

Comedy career
- Years active: 1994 – present
- Medium: Playwright. Director.

Richard Vincent (born 3 September 1969) is an English actor, playwright, theatre director and screenwriter from Croydon in London.

== Life ==
Vincent trained as an actor at the Drama Centre, London. His first play, "Off the Bone", was produced at the Courtyard Theatre in 1994. "Real Estate" was a selected play at the 1994 International Playwriting Festival at the Warehouse Theatre, Croydon and was produced at the Teatro Colosseo, Rome and developed into a screenplay by Granada Film.

== Theatre ==
Vincent enjoyed an ongoing relationship with the Warehouse Theatre: his plays "Skin Deep" and "Happy and Glorious" have been produced there and he is associate director and head of their writers' workshop. Vincent also has a close relationship with the Croydon Youth Theatre Organisation (CYTO), where he has been a tutor, director and artistic director. Vincent met his wife, Kathryn, at CYTO. In 2005, CYTO celebrated its 40th birthday with a production of Vincent's specially written play, Ruby, which he also co-directed. In 2014 Vincent wrote an adaptation of Cinderella entitled Sparkling Ashes. The show was created again at CYTO and has since gone on tour with a professional cast. In December 2015, Richard returned to mark 50 year of the organisation with another self-created production – Abi Understood. This production attracted the likes of TV presenter Matthew Wright and Actor Paul Bazely, who came to watch the show and join the 50th proceedings. On the night Matthew Wright spoke very highly of Vincent's work.

== TV and radio ==
Vincent's play "The Lost" was produced on BBC Radio 4 starring Bob Peck. He has also written for the BBC drama, "Casualty", and several screenplays for the UK Film Council, including a feature-length animated movie, "Fizzle". His play "Skin Deep" was given its first performance at the Warehouse Theatre Croydon on 17 May 2002. It was directed by Ted Craig and designed by Isla Shaw, with the following cast: Rae Baker [Chloe Smith], Frank Ellis [Sgt. Bill Cowgate], Colin Wells [Michael], Natasha Gordon [Dr. Amanda Holland], Simon Greiff [PC Gibbons/Simon Cairns], Penelope Woodman [Steph Cowgate].

== Works ==
A small selection of Vincent's work.

Title	Release date
"These Things Stay" (1996)	1996
"Sole" (1998), first produced Bridewell Theatre, London	1998
"The Lost" first produced for BBC Radio 4	1998
"Happy and Glorious" (1999), first produced Warehouse Theatre, London	1999
"Skin Deep" (2002), first produced Warehouse Theatre, London	2002
"Ruby" (2005), first produced CYTO, Shoestring Theatre, London	2005
"Shank" (2008), first produced CYTO, Shoestring Theatre, London	2008
"The Passion of Oakley Road" (2013), first produced CYTO, Shoestring Theatre, London	2013
"Red Tap/Blue Tiger" (2014), first produced The Albion Company, London	2014
"Sparkling Ashes" (2014), first produced CYTO, Shoestring Theatre, London	2014
"Abi Understood" (2015), first produced CYTO, Shoestring Theatre, London	2015
