= Ted Craig =

Australian-born theatre director (1940–2026)

- Born: 20 April 1940; Melbourne, Australia
- Died: 27 July 2026 (aged 86)
- Occupations: Theatre director, actor
- Partner: George Savvides
- Website: www.tedcraig.net

Ted Craig, FRSA (20 April 1940 – 27 July 2026) was an Australian-born theatre director, who was lately the artistic director of the Warehouse Theatre, South London, England.

== Life and career ==
Craig was born on 20 April 1940 in Melbourne, Australia, where he was also educated ar Caulfield Grammar School. He worked in Australian television as a director for four years, as well as an actor (Best Supporting Actor, 1964 Adelaide Festival of Arts). He travelled to England in 1964, where he joined the Crewe repertory company, and went on to act and direct at Crewe, Richmond, Folkestone, and Harrogate. He served as the resident artistic director at Crewe Theatre for three years, before taking over from Christopher Denys as the new artistic director at the Connaught, Worthing.

Craig directed theatre productions all over the UK, Europe, the United States, Asia and Australia, including the directorship of the Drama Theatre of the Sydney Opera House. His freelance productions have included the Off-Broadway production of Look Back in Anger with Malcolm McDowell (1980, Roundabout Theatre); Shakespeare's The Tempest, Congreve's Love for Love, Molière's The Misanthrope, Feydeau's The Lady from Maxim's all at the Sydney Opera House; Tarantara, Tarantara! by Ian Taylor (Theatre Royal, Sydney and Australian tour), the Australian première of The Elephant Man by Bernard Pomerance (Melbourne Theatre Company); and Arthur Miller's The Last Yankee and Joe Orton's Entertaining Mr Sloane (Theatro Ena, Cyprus).

From 1985 to 2012, Craig was the Artistic Director of the Warehouse Theatre, Croydon, London, and his productions included The Astronomer's Garden by Kevin Hood (Warehouse Theatre and Royal Court Theatre), Playing Sinatra by Bernard Kops (Warehouse Theatre and Greenwich Theatre), Sugar Hill Blues by Kevin Hood (Warehouse Theatre and Hampstead Theatre). He was also co-founder (with Steve Gooch) of the annual International Playwriting Festival, which takes place yearly. Other productions include Blood Royal by Charles Thomas at the Kings Head Theatre, Islington; Richard Vincent's Skin Deep; Sara Mason's The Kindness of Strangers with Susannah York;, George Parsons' Being Olivia. and the London revival of The Mystery of Edwin Drood by Rupert Holmes. While working with the Warehouse, he commissioned the Dick Barton - Special Agent series (based on the BBC Radio series) and directed all nine episodes. Following the withdrawal of funding by Croydon Council and the discovery of structural faults in the building, the Warehouse Theatre closed in May 2012 and the Warehouse Theatre Company was forced into administration. The building was demolished in October 2013, and a Boxpark retail development opened on the site in 2016.

He was a Fellow of the Royal Society of Arts. Craig died on 27 July 2026, at the age of 86. He was survived by his partner, George Savvides.
