= Becoming Jane Austen =

2003 demi-biographical novel

- Author: Jon Hunter Spence
- Language: English
- Publisher: Continuum International Publishing Group
- Publication date: 2003

Becoming Jane Austen is an imagined biography of Jane Austen by the Austen scholar Jon Hunter Spence. It chronicles a demi-biographical version of Austen's early life based on Spence's interpretation of the novel Pride and Prejudice as inspired and modeled on Austen's real life, although Austen herself does not make this claim for her novel.

Becoming Jane Austen was published in hardcover by Hambledon Continuum in 2003. It chronicles the early life of Jane Austen, the encounters and the developing relationship between Austen and Tom Lefroy, based on letters sent by Jane Austen to her sister Cassandra. The book served as the basis for the film Becoming Jane, which was released in January 2007 (Sydney). Jon Spence was a historical consultant for the film.

A review of the book by the Jane Austen Society of North America states that, "Jon Spence’s Becoming Jane Austen is one of the best half-dozen books published on Austen in the last quarter-century, at least. It is a remarkably learned book written in a remarkably lucid style and a joy to read. The research is so substantial, wide-ranging, and detailed that any conjecture Spence builds on it has the feel of bedrock itself. His interpretation of Jane Austen’s character and personality as well as of her fiction impresses the reader with his long and intimate acquaintance with the writer and her works."

A paperback edition of the book was published by Continuum on 14 June 2007

The Austen-Lefroy relationship was also used as the basis for Jane and Tom: The Real Pride and Prejudice, a radio play by Elizabeth Lewis. It was first broadcast on 1 June 2007, starring Jasmine Hyde as Austen and Andrew Scott as Lefroy, along with Penny Downie as Mrs Austen, Jane Whittenshaw as Mrs Lefroy, Rachel Atkins as Anne Lefroy, Lynne Seamore as Cassandra Austen, Keiron Self as John Warren, and Manon Edwards as Ellen, and directed by Celia De Wolff.
