= Funny Business (TV series) =

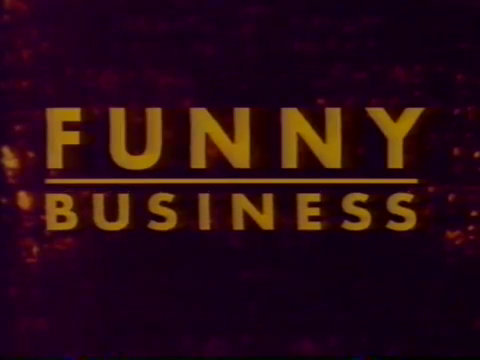
- Series title card
- Also known as: Laughing Matters
- Written by: various
- Directed by: various
- Starring: Rowan Atkinson
- Country of origin: United Kingdom
- Original language: English
- No. of series: 1
- No. of episodes: 6

Production
- Executive producer: Sarah Williams
- Producer: various
- Running time: 50 mins (each episode)
- Production company: BBC

Original release
- Network: BBC Two
- Release: 22 November – 27 December 1992

Funny Business, also known as Laughing Matters, is a BBC television documentary series about the craft of comedy. Originally airing in the UK on 22 November 1992, the series consisted of six 50-minute episodes with each one focusing on a different aspect of humour and show business entertainment. The series producer was Sarah Williams and was produced by Tiger Aspect Productions (formerly Tiger Television Productions) for the BBC. The series was also broadcast in Germany and New Zealand and later released on video.

== Episodes ==
=== Series 1 (1992) ===
No.	Title	Directed by	Written by	Original release date
1	"Visual Comedy - a Lecture by Rowan Atkinson, MSc (Oxon)"	David Hinton	Rowan Atkinson, Robin Driscoll, David Hinton	22 November 1992
All you ever needed to know about how to be funny without saying a word. A university lecturer leads us through the silent world of visual humour with the help of Kevin the mime artist. Cast : Rowan Atkinson, Robin Driscoll, Felicity Montagu
2	"A Stand-Up Life."	Unknown	Unknown	29 November 1992
Being a stand-up is the loneliest job in comedy. Five years ago, American comedian Al Lubel gave up a successful career as a lawyer to go on the road in search of fame. Now he faces his biggest challenge yet, on the show that can make or break any new comic - The Tonight Show with Johnny Carson. Cast : Al Lubel
3	"Let There Be Love"	Unknown	Unknown	6 December 1992
"It's like a marriage" says comedian Tommy Cannon, as this film examines the close but stormy partnership which goes to make up a comedy double-act. Cast :
4	"Feeding the Monster"	Nadia Haggar	Unknown	13 December 1992
Roseanne Arnold is one of America's funniest, richest and most controversial women, with a top-rated sitcom. This film goes behind the scenes as tempers fray when she is dissatisfied with a script. In the words of head writer Bob Myer, "situation comedy is a great gaping maw into which writers are thrown and eaten up alive". Cast :
5	"A Question of Taste"	Mark Chapman	Mark Chapman, Sarah Williams	20 December 1992
From religion to sex to language, comedy has always pushed the boundaries of taste. This is a mockumentary style film about the making of a documentary about offensive humour. Cast : Daryl Webster (Kate), Luke Sorba (Nigel), Hugh Armstrong (Dick), Rebecca Tremain (Jo), Roy Chubby Brown, Stephanie Hodge, Bill Hicks
6	"A Fool's Guide to Movie Comedy"	Nigel Cole	Unknown	27 December 1992
The last programme in the series tries to find out whether there are any sure-fire rules on how to make a hit comedy movie, from the initial concept through to the starstudded Hollywood premiere. Comedy director David Zucker describes his ten golden rules of comedy, as seen in both the Airplane! and The Naked Gun films, and others offer their tips on what makes cinema-goers laugh. Cast : Leslie Nielsen, Carl Reiner, Lowell Ganz, Babaloo Mandel, David Zucker, Damon Wayans, Penelope Spheeris, Gene Wilder, Buck Henry, Penny Marshall, Jonathan Lynn, Gabriel Beristain, Eddie Murphy, Mike Myers, Charles Grodin

== Visual Comedy: A Lecture by Rowan Atkinson M.Sc. (Oxon.) ==
This episode was directed by David Hinton. The writers were Rowan Atkinson, Robin Driscoll, and David Hinton. The show featured appearances by many comedians, including Rowan Atkinson who made an appearance both as the presenter/narrator and as an aspiring comedy actor named Kevin Bartholomew. Atkinson demonstrated many of the principles of comedy (slapstick, mime, etc.) in a manner which was instantly identifiable to anyone familiar with his Mr. Bean character. In this episode, Atkinson claims that the three principal mechanics behind visual comedy are for an object or person to

1. behave in an unexpected way
2. be in an unexpected place
3. be of the wrong size

In a central part of the documentary, Atkinson emphasizes the need to deliver the comedy with a carefully crafted attitude or persona. The character behind the comedy is at least as important as the techniques used. He claims that even though Charlie Chaplin is considered to be one of the greatest comedians of all time, Chaplin does not make us laugh anymore today, because we can not identify with Chaplin's "attitude."

=== The Subsections of the Episode ===
This 50-minute episode shows the mechanics at work in chapters that define visual comedy. Each section illustrates examples of mostly early visual comedy and references to the comedians, actors, and directors that defined these movements. The post-era visual comedy that is referenced is that of slapstick comedian Leslie Nielsen.

==== Slapstick and Violence ====
- Laughing at others' pain and humiliation
- Early American violence and Mack Sennett's contribution of the Keystone Cops
- "The more real it is, the funnier it is"
- Pain in comedy is conveyed by
  - Over-exaggeration
  - Under-exaggeration

==== Magic and Surrealism ====
- The similarities between comedians and magicians
  - Sudden appearances or disappearances
- Georges Méliès: "the first person to make surreal jokes using film magic"
- Exaggerated movement speeds (speeding things up)
- Comedy is rooted in fear
- Haunted house movies use the principles of appearances/disappearances

==== Imitation and Parody ====
- Parody is exaggerated imitation (imitation that implies ridicule)
- Satire: parodying a person who represents "power" or "authority"
- Parodies of pop culture use three kinds of comedy
1. Imitating the mannerisms of a well-known character
2. Jokes about the physical mechanics of the parody
3. Imitation of the visual style of the original

==== Mime and Body Language ====
- The comedy of personality (as opposed to comedy about gags) is about doing something normal in a funny way (expressed through body language)
- Jacques Tati: made post-silent era films without dialogue

==== Jokes and Attitude ====
1. The Dim Attitude: stupidity and a lack of awareness (that's less than the audience)
2. The Aggressive Attitude: Apathy toward others
3. The Crude Attitude: vulgarity
4. Charlie Chaplin: he was the master of visual comedy

==== The Character of the Physical Comedian ====
- The comedian must be an "alien" to familiarities, customs, and traditions
- The comedian must have "innocence" as though they were "born yesterday"
- Harry Langdon: "an adult with the emotional and intellectual equivalent of an infant"
- Childishness comes out in the comedian's "battle" with objects (giving the objects a "life" of their own)
- The comedian must be clumsy by making mistakes and having accidents with objects
- The comedian will keep attempting something "long after a normal person would've given up"
- The comedian doesn't understand or just disregards "morality," "legality," or traditional conventions

===== Three Different Approaches from the Comedian's Manual of Sexual Relationships =====
1. The Romantic Approach: "his emotional age zooms up from childhood to early adolescence"
2. The Direct Approach: "ignores all codes of proper behavior and acts on his desires"
3. The Startled Virgin: a role reversal "with the woman as the sexual aggressor" and the male as a "bewildered child"

==== The Final Point ====
"The physical comedian is indestructible...whatever the odds against him, the comedian always survives to walk away at the end of the story."

— Rowan Atkinson

== Reception ==
Montreal Gazette's Mike Boone found that Funny Business is incomplete and outdated as it failed to include Roseanne, Seinfeld, and The Larry Sanders Show. He wrote, "But lack of up-to-dateness is a minor quibble about an otherwise fascinating - and frequently funny - documentary. Funny Business talks to the best and brightest in network comedy: English, Larry Gelbart, Norman Lear, James Burrows. The creators are uniformly candid, articulate and interesting." Derek Leather of The Age praised the television series, writing, "In spite of this roster, Kevin is one of the funniest characters in Funny Business, underlining the preeminence of Atkinson as a visual comedian. The six episodes in this series will be enough to see you through the election. Great comic timing by the ABC and compulsory viewing for everyone wanting to keep a sense of proportion."
