= The City Speaks =

The City Speaks is two BBC radio dramas, a feature film and six collaborations between audio drama directors, script-writers, artist film-makers, composer David Pickvance and sound designer Pete Ringrose.

The City Speaks is a multi-platform project and a collaboration between BBC radio drama and Film London. It is also an experiment in the emerging world of visual radio, currently being pioneered at the BBC. The project was created and overseen by BBC Radio Drama Producer for Special Projects, Conor Lennon.

The film premiered at bfi Southbank (formerly the National Film Theatre) on 11 March 2008. It is possible that another screening will take place at bfi Southbank and European film festival screenings are also planned.

The City Speaks was broadcast on BBC Radio 4 and on digital TV (under the red button on cable and freeview) on the 19 and 20 March 2008.

The six films were also available on the BBC Film Network website.
