= Thomas Langlois Lefroy =

Irish politician and judge

The Right Honourable Thomas Langlois Lefroy
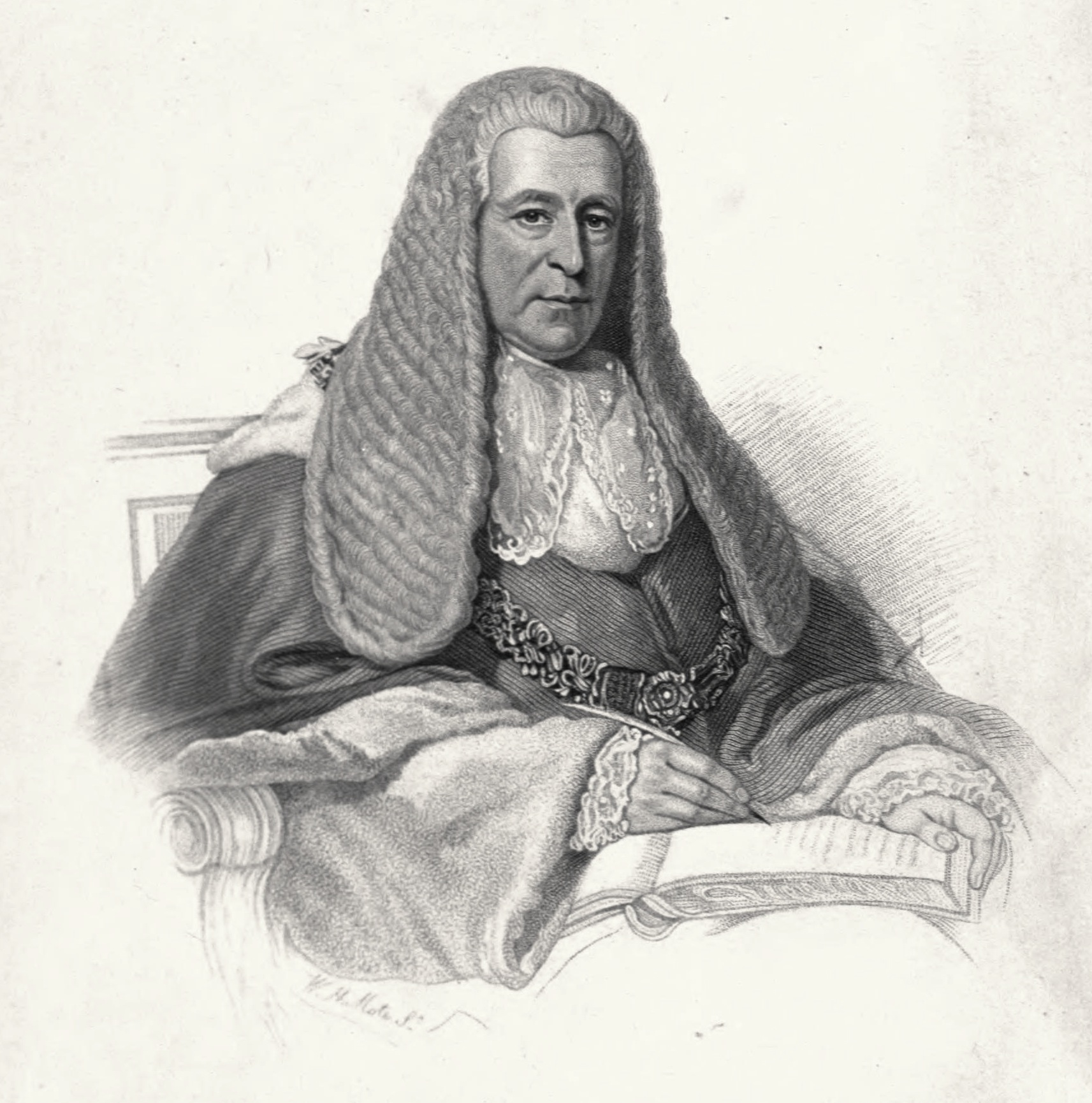
- Thomas Langlois Lefroy 1855 by W. H. Mote

Lord Chief Justice of the Queen's Bench for Ireland
- In office 1852–1866
- Monarch: Victoria
- Preceded by: Francis Blackburne
- Succeeded by: James Whiteside

Personal details
- Born: 8 January 1776
- Died: 4 May 1869 (aged 93)
- Children: 7, including Anthony

Thomas Langlois Lefroy (8 January 1776 – 4 May 1869) was an Irish politician and judge. He served as an MP for the constituency of Dublin University in 1830–1841, Privy Councillor of Ireland in 1835–1869 and Lord Chief Justice of Ireland in 1852–1866.

== Early life ==
Thomas Lefroy was born in Limerick, Ireland. He had an outstanding academic record at Trinity College Dublin, from 1790 to 1793. His great-uncle, Benjamin Langlois, sponsored Tom's legal studies at Lincoln's Inn, London. One year later, Lefroy served as Auditor of Trinity's College Historical Society, the still-active debating society of the college. Later still, he became a prominent member of the Irish bar (having been called to it in 1797) and published a series of Law Reports on the cases of the Irish Court of Chancery.

== Tom Lefroy and Jane Austen ==
In 1796, Lefroy began a flirtation with Jane Austen, who was a friend of an older relative, Anne Brydges Lefroy. Jane Austen wrote two letters to her sister Cassandra mentioning "Tom Lefroy", and some have suggested that it may have been he whom Austen had in mind when she invented the character of Mr. Darcy in Pride and Prejudice, as the courtship between Tom Lefroy and Jane Austen took place over the year or so that Pride and Prejudice was written. In his 2003 biography, Becoming Jane Austen, Jon Spence suggests that Jane Austen actually used her and Tom Lefroy's personalities as the models for Mr. Darcy and Elizabeth Bennet, but not in an expected way. Spence suggests that Jane Austen used Tom Lefroy's more gregarious personality as the model for the novel's heroine Elizabeth Bennet, and her own measured demeanor was used as the model for the male protagonist, Mr. Darcy.

In a letter dated Saturday (9 January 1796), Austen mentioned:

You scold me so much in the nice long letter which I have this moment received from you, that I am almost afraid to tell you how my Irish friend and I behaved. Imagine to yourself everything most profligate and shocking in the way of dancing and sitting down together. I can expose myself however, only once more, because he leaves the country soon after next Friday, on which day we are to have a dance at Ashe after all. He is a very gentlemanlike, good-looking, pleasant young man, I assure you. But as to our having ever met, except at the three last balls, I cannot say much; for he is so excessively laughed at about me at Ashe, that he is ashamed of coming to Steventon, and ran away when we called on Mrs. Lefroy a few days ago.
. . .
After I had written the above, we received a visit from Mr. Tom Lefroy and his cousin George. The latter is really very well-behaved now; and as for the other, he has but one fault, which time will, I trust, entirely remove – it is that his morning coat is a great deal too light. He is a very great admirer of Tom Jones, and therefore wears the same coloured clothes, I imagine, which he did when he was wounded.

In a letter started on Thursday (14 January 1796), and finished the following morning, there was another mention of him.

Friday. – At length the day is come on which I am to flirt my last with Tom Lefroy, and when you receive this it will be over. My tears flow as I write at the melancholy idea.

Austen's surviving correspondence contains only one other mention of Tom Lefroy, in a November 1798 letter that Austen biographer Claire Tomalin believes demonstrates the author's "bleak remembrance, and persistent interest" in Lefroy. In the letter to her sister, Austen writes that Tom's aunt Mrs. Lefroy had been to visit, but had not said anything about her nephew...

"...to me, and I was too proud to make any enquiries; but on my father's afterwards asking where he was, I learnt that he was gone back to London in his way to Ireland, where he is called to the Bar and means to practise."

Another possible mention of Lefroy is in Austen's Emma (1815). In chapter 9, Emma Woodhouse and Harriet Smith discuss a poem. Austen may have hidden the word TOLMEYFOR—an anagram of TOM LEFROY—in the poem.

Upon learning of Jane Austen's death (18 July 1817), Lefroy travelled from Ireland to England to pay his respects to the British author. In addition, at an auction of Cadell's papers (possibly in London), one Tom Lefroy bought a Cadell publisher's rejection letter—for Austen's early version of Pride and Prejudice, titled First Impressions. Caroline Austen said in her letter to James Edward Austen-Leigh on 1 April 1869:

I enclose a copy of Mr. Austen's letter to Cadell—I do not know which novel he would have sent—The letter does not do much credit to the tact or courtesy of our good Grandfather for Cadell was a great man in his day, and it is not surprising that he should have refused the favour so offered from an unknown—but the circumstance may be worth noting, especially as we have so few incidents to produce. At a sale of Cadell's papers &c Tom Lefroy picked up the original letter—and Jemima copied it for me –

It was unlikely that Caroline Austen would address the Chief Justice Lefroy as only 'Tom Lefroy' (she indeed addressed him as the still living 'Chief Justice' in the later part of the letter). However, if it is true that the original Tom Lefroy purchased the Cadell letter after Jane's death, it is possible that he later handed it over to Thomas Edward Preston Lefroy (T.E.P. Lefroy; husband of Jemima Lefroy who was the daughter of Anna Austen Lefroy and Benjamin Lefroy). T.E.P. Lefroy later would give Cadell's letter to Caroline for reference. Cadell & Davies firm was closed down in 1836 after the death of Thomas Cadell Jr. The sale of Cadell's papers took place in 1840, possibly in November.

In the latter years of Tom Lefroy's life, he was questioned about his relationship with Jane Austen by his nephew, and admitted to having loved Jane Austen, but stated that it was a "boyish love". As is written in a letter sent from T.E.P. Lefroy to James Edward Austen Leigh in 1870,

My late venerable uncle ... said in so many words that he was in love with her, although he qualified his confession by saying it was a boyish love. As this occurred in a friendly & private conversation, I feel some doubt whether I ought to make it public.

A fictional account of their relationship is at the center of the 2007 historical romance film Becoming Jane. In this film, Lefroy is played by James McAvoy, and Austen by Anne Hathaway.

== Political career ==
Lefroy contested Dublin University in an 1827 by-election, as a Tory, but finished third.

An idea of Lefroy's politics is given by the opening of an editorial in The Times (of London) on Friday 27 February 1829 when he was opposing the Roman Catholic Relief Act 1829, whose effect was to admit Irish Catholics to parliament (if they met a high property qualification).

Serjeant Lefroy and Mr Saurin have been… re-edifying their Orange disciples in Dublin with much curious but rather apocryphal twaddle, touching the coronation oath, the Act of Settlement and so on.
The learned Serjeant expresses his hostility to the proposed law by declaring that he is averse to the removal of ancient landmarks. Now, if the saintly Serjeant means that the letter of a law can constitute a political landmark, we can assure him he is in pitiable error.

Lefroy may have been influenced by Huguenot family memories of persecution by French Catholics; this was the case with other opponents of Catholic emancipation such as William Saurin mentioned above.

Richard Lalor Sheil published a profile of Lefroy stating (amongst many hostile remarks on his combination of piety and moneymaking) that Lefroy was well known for his interest in the conversion of Jews to Protestantism, leading Daniel O'Connell to joke during a lawsuit over a collection of antique coins that Lefroy should be given the Hebrew coins as his fee while O'Connell received those with a Roman inscription. Patrick Geoghegan's life of O'Connell, King Dan, states that O'Connell held Lefroy's legal abilities in contempt and regarded him as a prime example of a lawyer promoted above more meritorious Catholics (notably O'Connell himself) because of his Protestant religion and Tory politics.

He was elected to the House of Commons for the Dublin University seat in 1830, as a Tory (the party later became known as Conservative). He became a member of the Privy Council of Ireland on 29 January 1835. In 1838, Thomas Langlois Lefroy received American politician Charles Sumner during Sumner's visit to Ireland. Tom Lefroy continued to represent the university until he was appointed an Irish judge (with the title of a Baron of the Exchequer) in 1841. In 1848 he presided over the sedition trial of the Young Irelander John Mitchel.

He was promoted to Chief Justice of the Court of Queen's Bench in Ireland in 1852. Despite some allegations in Parliament, that he was too old to do the job, Lefroy did not resign as Chief Justice until he was aged 90 and a Conservative government was in office to fill the vacancy. This was in July 1866. One apocryphal story (in the memoirs of the Home Rule MP JG Swift MacNeill) describes Lefroy's son as denying in Parliament that his father was too old to perform his duties, but being himself so visibly old and feeble as to produce the opposite effect on parliamentary opinion. Another version of this story has the son defending his father's capacity although he himself had applied to be excused certain official duties on account of advanced age. The Hansard report of the debate can be found here.

In a satirical pamphlet on the Trinity College Dublin election of 1865 Joseph Sheridan Le Fanu suggests that Lefroy was so old that he had "ridden on the mastodon to hunt the megatherium" and mocks the manner in which the Conservative lawyer-politicians Joseph Napier and James Whiteside allegedly insisted whenever the Conservatives were in power (and might appoint them to replace him) that Lefroy is too old to perform his duties, only to insist whenever a Whig government is in power that he is in perfect health.

== Interest in astronomy ==
Tom Lefroy was also interested in astronomy. On 30 March 1846, he visited William Parsons, the 3rd Earl of Rosse in Parsonstown to try Parsons's new telescope called Leviathan of Parsonstown. Tom later said to his wife (Letter 31 March 1846):

Yesterday was indeed a most interesting day. Lord Rosse and his wife were as kind to me as possible. The wonders of his telescope are not to be told. He says—with as much ease as another man would say, "Come and I'll show you a beautiful prospect"—"Come and I'll show you a universe, one of a countless multitude of universes, each larger than the whole universe hitherto known to astronomers." The planet Jupiter, which through an ordinary glass is no larger than a good star, is seen twice as large as the moon appears to the naked eye. It was all true what Doherty [a Chief Justice, more than six feet high] said, that he walked upright in the tube with an umbrella over his head before it was set. But the genius displayed in all the contrivances for wielding this mighty monster even surpasses the design and execution of it. The telescope weighs sixteen tons, and yet Lord Rosse raised it single-handed off its resting place, and two men with ease raised it to any height.

== Family ==
According to the website of (Tom Lefroy's house in Longford, Ireland), the Lefroy family came from the town of Cambrai in the northwestern corner of France. They were a Huguenot family, and one of their heads of the family, the Lord L'Offroy, died at the Battle of Agincourt in 1415.

=== Tom Lefroy's siblings ===
Tom Lefroy was born of the Irish Lefroys, descendants of a Huguenot Lefroy who migrated to England in the 16th century, hence the French-sounding name (the family head being a Lord L'Offroy). In 1765, Tom's father Anthony Peter Lefroy was secretly married to Ann Gardner in Limerick, Ireland. Five girls were born (Radovici mentioned five, but Cranfield mentioned four; it is possible that one of Tom's elder sisters died in infancy) without the knowledge of Benjamin Langlois, Tom's great-uncle and his family's benefactor. Thomas Langlois Lefroy was the sixth child, also the first son. The list of Tom's siblings (including him) is as follows:

1. Unnamed fifth elder sister (actual birth order unknown)
2. Lucy (1 January 1768 – May 1853)
3. Phoebe (15 April 1770 – 5 December 1839)
4. Catherine (18 September 1771 – 3 September 1805)
5. Sarah (18 March 1773 – 1836)
6. Thomas Langlois (8 January 1776 – 4 May 1869)
7. Anthony (19 October 1777 – 7 September 1857)
  - Anthony's son (Thomas Edward Preston Lefroy, 1815–1887) later married Anna Jemima Lefroy (1815–1855, daughter of Anna Austen Lefroy) on 9 September 1846
8. Elizabeth (17 April 1780 – 22 July 1867)
9. Benjamin (5 May 1782 – 1 September 1869)
10. Christopher (26 June 1784 – 14 February 1805)
11. Anne (26 January 1786 – ?)
12. Henry (5 May 1789 – 29 January 1876) – Vicar of Santry (St. Pappan's Church)

=== Tom Lefroy's children ===
Tom Lefroy married Mary Paul on 16 March 1799 in north Wales. From their marriage, they had seven children as listed in the Visitation of Ireland:

1. Anthony Lefroy (21 March 1800 – 11 January 1890), subsequently MP for his father's old seat of Dublin University.
2. Jane Christmas Lefroy (24 June 1802 – 3 August 1896)
3. Anne Lefroy (25 April 1804 – 24 February 1885)
4. Thomas Paul Lefroy (31 December 1806 – 29 January 1891; wrote Memoir of Chief Justice Lefroy, published in 1871)
5. The Very Rev. Jeffry Lefroy (25 March 1809 – 10 December 1885)
6. George Thomson Lefroy (26 May 1811 – 19 March 1890)
7. Mary Elizabeth Lefroy (19 December 1817 – 23 January 1890)

Another son (Benjamin, born 25 March 1815) died in infancy. Tom Lefroy's daughters never married.

==== Jane Christmas Lefroy ====
Tom Lefroy's first daughter was named Jane Christmas Lefroy. Scholars debate the derivation of this name. Some believe that the name Jane was derived from Lady Jane Paul (Tom's mother-in-law). Others believe the name referred to Jane Austen. The second theory is implied in the 2007 film Becoming Jane. Christmas was a family name coming from the Paul family

== Carrigglas Manor ==
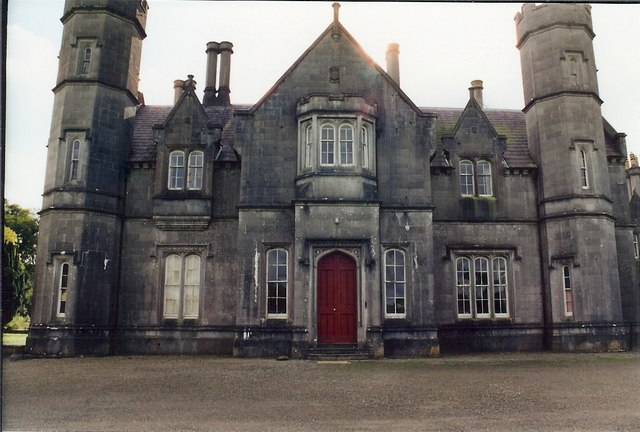
Carrigglas Manor House, 2001

Carrigglas Manor was a Gothic-style great house built for Lefroy and his family circa 1830 (Memoir of Chief Justice Lefroy). The family had lived in Carrigglas before 1837 (one of Tom's letters for Mary was dated 5 October 1834). James Gandon the famous architect of Dublin's Custom House designed and built a stable block and farmyard and walled garden for Lefroy. In 1837, Lefroy renovated the Manor with the help of Daniel Robertson, Esq., a famous English architect. A hurricane on 6 January 1839 destroyed some parts of the house, and Lefroy had to rebuild it.

The Lefroy family sold the Manor and Estate in 2006. As of 2010, the plan to adapt the manor house to be part of a newly built hotel, and to turn the 660 acres (270 ha) park into a golf course and housing estate collapsed and work at Carrigglas was terminated before the hotel or any of the new houses were occupied. In 2014, the estate was bought by the Longford family and company Glennon's who are the current owners.

== Arms ==
Coat of arms of Thomas Langlois Lefroy

Notes
Granted 16 March 1857 by Sir John Bernard Burke, Ulster King of Arms.
Crest
A demi-wyvern Gules langued and armed Azure.
Escutcheon
Quarterly 1st & 4th Vert fretty of eight pieces Argent on a chief of the second a hood or cap (allusive to the badge assumed by the party opposed to the Duke of Alva) between two wyverns Gules (Lefroy) 2nd & 3rd Azure a chevron Or between three crescents Argent on a chief Gules three mullets of the third (Langlois).
Motto
Mutare Sperno

Parliament of the United Kingdom
Preceded by John Wilson Croker	Member of Parliament for Dublin University; 1830–1841; With: Sir Frederick Shaw, Bt from 1832	Succeeded by Joseph Devonsher Jackson; Sir Frederick Shaw, Bt
Legal offices
Preceded by Francis Blackburne	Lord Chief Justice of the King's Bench for Ireland; 1852–1866	Succeeded by James Whiteside
