= Kevin Hood =

- Born: Kevin Hood
- Occupations: Writer, screenwriter
- Years active: 1987−present
- Known for: Grange Hill, Becoming Jane

Kevin Hood is a playwright and screenwriter who is perhaps best known for contributing scripts to the BBC television series Grange Hill and the 2007 film Becoming Jane.

== Career ==
A successful playwright from 1987 to 1998, Hood wrote the plays Beached, Astronomer's Garden, Sugar Hill Blues, Hammett's Apprentice, and So Special. During this period, Hood delved into television. He wrote episodes of Medics and Grange Hill, a popular school drama for BBC. Later he co-devised the crime drama Silent Witness, writing four episode scripts. Hood also penned the screenplay for the 1998 television film The Echo, a thriller starring Clive Owen, as well as the serial In a Land of Plenty featuring Robert Pugh and Man and Boy with Ioan Gruffudd.

In 2004, Ecosse Films hired Hood to aid in the development of a screenplay for Becoming Jane, a 2007 film depicting the early life of Jane Austen. Screenwriter Sarah Williams had completed several drafts at the time of Hood's entry to the project. Robert Bernstein, a producer with Ecosse, believed that Hood's past work contained "a romantic sensibility. There is a poetic quality about his writing as well as there being a rigorous emotional truth which I thought was important for Jane." Hood agreed to join the production because he believed "the story is such an important one and very much the inspiration for Pride and Prejudice." He worked on the script with director Julian Jarrold over a two-year period.

In 2011, Hood was reported to be attached as the screenwriter for Reykjavík, a drama film about the Cold War. Media sources reported that it was to be directed and produced by Ridley Scott, though they also questioned whether his schedule would fit such a film. The film is set to star Michael Douglas as Ronald Reagan and Christoph Waltz as Mikhail Gorbachev, and was to begin shooting in March 2013.
