= Jon Hunter Spence =

American writer

- Born: July 30, 1945; Camilla, Georgia, United States
- Died: June 20, 2011 (aged 65); Sydney, Australia
- Education: Tulane University (MA); King's College London (PhD)
- Alma mater: University of Georgia
- Occupation: author
- Spouse: Betsy McShane (1966–1972)
- Writing career
- Language: English
- Genres: English literature Jane Austen
- Notable work: Becoming Jane Austen

Jon Hunter Spence (July 30, 1945 – June 20, 2011) was an American Jane Austen scholar. His 2003 biography, Becoming Jane Austen, was adapted into a feature film starring Anne Hathaway in 2007.

== Education ==
Spence received a BA in English literature at the University of Georgia, an MA at Tulane University, and obtained a PhD from King's College London. He returned to teach at Georgia, and later taught at King Saud University in Saudi Arabia and Hiroshima University and Doshisha University in Japan. He was a long-standing member of the editorial board of the Jane Austen Society of Australia, became an Australian citizen in May 2011, and committed suicide, at his Sydney home in Double Bay the following month.

== Biography ==
Spence's biography Becoming Jane Austen was published in 2003. University of Wisconsin–Madison English professor Joseph Wiesenfarth noted in a review that the work "is one of the best half-dozen books published on Austen in the last quarter century, at least. It is a remarkably learned book written in a remarkably lucid style and a joy to read. The research is so substantial, wide-ranging, and detailed that any conjecture Spence builds on it has the feel of bedrock itself. His interpretation of Jane Austen’s character and personality as well as of her fiction impresses the reader with his long and intimate acquaintance with the writer and her works." Wiesenfarth also observed that the book must have required "research in dusty, neglected archives", which he believed led to "polished and penetrating readings of Austen’s novels along with an evocation of their author’s character".

Becoming Jane Austen provided the scholarly basis for the film Becoming Jane, released in 2007, on which Spence served as a consultant.

== Works ==
- A Century of Wills from Jane Austen's Family, 1705–1806 (2001) (editor)
- Becoming Jane Austen (2003 & 2007)
- Jane Austen's Brother Abroad: The Grand Tour Journals of Edward Austen (2005) (editor)
