= List of incomplete novels finished by other authors =

The following is a list of incomplete novels finished by other authors.

Title	Original author	Completing author(s)	Notes
The Assassination Bureau, Ltd	Jack London	Robert L. Fish	London wrote 20,000 words, but could not come up with a logical ending.
L'Astrée	Honoré d'Urfé	Balthazar Baro (4th part), Pierre Boitel, sieur de Gaubertin (5th and 6th parts)	D'Urfé completed three parts of this immense work (5399 pages).
Blind Love	Wilkie Collins	Walter Besant	Collins "left detailed plans for the last third of this novel".
The Buccaneers	Edith Wharton	Marion Mainwaring	
Eruption	Michael Crichton	James Patterson	Crichton was writing this novel while fighting cancer and his widow Sherri gave Patterson permission to finish the story.
The Ghost-Seer	Friedrich Schiller	Hanns Heinz Ewers	
The Guernsey Literary and Potato Peel Pie Society	Mary Ann Shaffer	Annie Barrows	When Ms. Shaffer's health deteriorated, Ms. Barrows took over to finish the manuscript. She is listed as co-author.
Hornblower and the Crisis	C. S. Forester	Several	
The Knight of Sainte-Hermine	Alexandre Dumas	Claude Schopp	The nearly complete lost novel was rediscovered in 1990 by Dumas expert Schopp, who wrote three more chapters.
The Last Theorem	Arthur C. Clarke	Frederik Pohl	Suffering from ill health and writer's block, Clarke asked Pohl to finish the novel. Clarke reviewed and approved the final manuscript just days before he died, but the critics' opinions were mixed.
Micro	Michael Crichton	Richard Preston	It was based on an untitled, unfinished manuscript found on his computer.
The Mystery of Edwin Drood	Charles Dickens	Numerous	Six of 12 planned instalments (23 chapters) were published.
Poodle Springs	Raymond Chandler	Robert B. Parker	Chandler wrote four chapters, consisting of 31 pages. Ed Victor, the agent for his estate, asked Parker to supply the rest.
Sanditon	Jane Austen	Numerous, including Anna Austen Lefroy, Austen's niece	Austen finished 11 chapters.
St. Ives	Robert Louis Stevenson	Arthur Quiller-Couch	Quiller-Couch wrote the final six chapters.
Thrones, Dominations	Dorothy L. Sayers	Jill Paton Walsh	
Under the Hill	Aubrey Beardsley	John Glassco	
The Watsons	Jane Austen	Numerous, including Joan Aiken	

== See also ==
- Variable Star, a novel written by Spider Robinson based on the surviving seven pages of an eight-page 1955 novel outline by Robert A. Heinlein
- Continuator
- Continuation novel
