= Miss Austen =

British television series

- Genre: Historical drama
- Based on: Miss Austen by Gill Hornby
- Screenplay by: Andrea Gibb
- Directed by: Aisling Walsh
- Starring: Keeley Hawes; Synnøve Karlsen; Jessica Hynes; Patsy Ferran; Rose Leslie; Mirren Mack; Max Irons; Alfred Enoch
- Composer: Dominik Scherrer
- Country of origin: United Kingdom
- Original language: English
- No. of series: 1
- No. of episodes: 4

Production
- Executive producers: Andrea Gibb; Keeley Hawes; Christine Langan; Susanne Simpson; Polly Williams
- Producer: Stella Merz
- Production companies: Bonnie Productions; Masterpiece; Federation Stories

Original release
- Network: BBC One; PBS
- Release: 2 February – 23 February 2025

Miss Austen is a four-part historical drama television series. It stars Keeley Hawes and Jessica Hynes. It is an adaptation by Andrea Gibb of the novel Miss Austen by Gill Hornby. Aisling Walsh directed the series, while Stella Merz produced for Bonnie Productions and Masterpiece. The series premiered on 2 February 2025 on BBC One.

== Premise ==
In year 1830, Cassandra Austen, the sister of the late Jane Austen, visits the family Fowle, when Reverend Fowle is dying, and promises him that his daughter Isabella will go to live with one of her sisters. Additionally, she looks for the letters Jane has written in her youth to Fowle's wife Elizabeth, planning to destroy them so that the private themes discussed cannot stain Jane's reputation. Mary Austen, James Austen's widow, also looks for these letters, in order to write a biography about Jane and James Austen. Reading the letters, Cassandra reminisces about the past, which is shown in flashbacks. These cover Cassandra's engagement to Tom Fowle, who dies soon after, Mary's marriage to James Austen, losses of relatives and homes for the Austen family, new chances for love, and Jane's literary trials and successes. They end before her death. Cassandra burns most of the letters, except for a few she leaves for Mary to discover. She departs after Isabella has reconciled with a former suitor, going against the will of her father, but following her own heart.

== Cast and characters ==
=== Main ===
- Keeley Hawes as Cassandra Austen, Jane Austen's only sister
  - Synnøve Karlsen as young Cassandra (Cassy) Austen
- Alfred Enoch as Mr. Lidderdale, a physician and Isabella's suitor
- Patsy Ferran as Jane Austen, Cassandra's sister, a novelist
- Jessica Hynes as Mary Austen, née Lloyd, Eliza's sister and James Austen's widow, thus Cassandra and Jane's sister-in-law
  - Liv Hill as young Mary Austen
- Max Irons as Henry Hobday, a fictional potential suitor for Cassandra
- Rose Leslie as Isabella Fowle, a daughter of Fulwar Fowle
- Phyllis Logan as Cassandra (Mrs George) Austen, the Austens' mother
- Calam Lynch as Tom Fowle, Fulwar Fowle's brother, who is Cassandra's late fiancé
- Mirren Mack as Dinah, the Fowles' maid
- Kevin McNally as George Austen, the Austens' father

=== Recurring ===
- Florence Bell as Mary Jane Dexter, née Fowle, Isabella’s sister
- Carys Bowkett as Anna Austen, James Austen's daughter
  - Vivien Battley as young Anna
- Hubert Burton as Edward Austen, a brother of Cassandra and Jane
- Thomas Coombes as Mr. Dundas, the new vicar moving into Fowle House
- Clare Foster as Beth Fowle, a sister of Isabella
- Jake Kenny-Byrne as Frank Austen, a brother of Cassandra and Jane
- Patrick Knowles as James Austen, Cassandra and Jane's eldest brother
- Felix Scott as Reverend Fulwar Fowle, Tom Fowle's brother and Isabella's father
- Madeline Walker as Eliza Fowle, Fulwar Fowle's wife, Mary Austen's sister and Isabella's mother

=== Guest ===
- Tom Glenister as Harris Bigg-Wither, Jane's short-time fiancé
- Rebecca Johnson as Mrs. Hobday, Henry Hobday's mother
- Elle McKay as Catherine Bigg-Wither, a sister of Harris
- Eve Ponsonby as Elizabeth Austen, Edward Austen's wife
- Ruby Richardson as Alethea Bigg-Wither, a sister of Harris

== Production ==
Aisling Walsh directed the four-part series and also acts as executive producer. Other executive producers on the series were Susanne Simpson for Masterpiece, Christine Langan for Bonnie Productions, Polly Williams for Federation Stories, Keeley Hawes who stars and Andrea Gibb, who also adapted the book by Gill Hornby. Filming got underway in November 2023.

The series features Keeley Hawes as Jane Austen's elder sister, Cassandra, and Jessica Hynes as Jane Austen's sister-in-law, Mary. Rose Leslie is the Austen's family friend Isabella and Mirren Mack is her servant Dinah. Also in the cast are Max Irons and Alfred Enoch.

In June 2025, it was reported that pre-production was beginning on a sequel series, Miss Austen Returns, with Keeley Hawes reprising her role as Cassandra Austen and key cast returning. It will be an adaption of Gill Hornby's follow-up novel, The Elopement.

== Broadcast ==
In December 2023, the BBC acquired the rights to show the series in the UK, and it was broadcast on BBC One and iPlayer from 2 February 2025.

The series' broadcast on Masterpiece on PBS began on 4 May 2025.

== Reception ==
Shivani Gonzalez in The New York Times noted that although "the characters are all based on real life people in Austen’s life, the actual story lines here are mostly fictional”.

Lucy Mangan in The Guardian awarded the series four stars and praised the performance of Keeley Hawes.

In January 2026, Walsh was nominated at the Irish Film & Television Awards for best director.
