= Miss Austen Regrets =

2007 television film by Jeremy Lovering

- DVD cover
- Written by: Gwyneth Hughes
- Directed by: Jeremy Lovering
- Starring: Olivia Williams; Imogen Poots; Greta Scacchi; Hugh Bonneville
- Theme music composer: Jennie Muskett
- Countries of origin: United Kingdom; United States
- Original language: English

Production
- Producers: Anne Pivcevic; Jamie Laurenson; Susanne Simpson; Steven Ashley
- Cinematography: David Katznelson
- Editor: Luke Dunkley
- Running time: 90 minutes

Original release
- Network: BBC One
- Release: 21 August 2007
- Network: WGBH
- Release: 3 February 2008

Miss Austen Regrets is a 2007 biographical drama television film directed by Jeremy Lovering and written by Gwyneth Hughes. It stars Olivia Williams as Jane Austen, with Imogen Poots, Greta Scacchi, Hugh Bonneville, Adrian Edmondson and Jack Huston. It premiered on 21 August 2007 on BBC One in the United Kingdom and on 3 February 2008 in the United States by PBS' drama anthology television series Masterpiece as part of The Complete Jane Austen, the US version of The Jane Austen Season.

== Summary ==
In 1802, Jane Austen receives a proposal of marriage, which she accepts. Her sister Cassandra is concerned and asks her if she is sure of her choice. By the next morning, Jane has changed her mind, although she wonders if she has made the right decision.

In 1814, Jane and Cassandra attend the wedding of their niece Anna Austen to Benjamin Lefroy. "Favourite aunt" Jane accompanies her niece Fanny and brother Edward Austen-Knight home. Fanny showers her aunt with questions about love, marriage, and particularly, why Jane herself never married. Fanny introduces Jane to one of her potential suitors, Mr. Plumptre, but Jane is unsure if their love is real or not. Admitting that she herself has no experience, Jane still declares that everyone should have the chance to marry once for love.

Jane is startled and surprised to receive an unexpected visit from Fanny's uncle, the Reverend Brook Bridges – a man who has clearly played a part in Jane's past. Reverend Bridges has concerns about Jane as a role model, "leading her young niece astray with her fanciful ideas and clever wit". His worst fears are confirmed when Fanny, convinced that Mr. Plumptre will not propose, blames Jane for standing in the way of her desire to be happily married.

The following year, Jane travels to London where another of her brothers, Henry, lives. She asks him to accompany her to negotiate with her publisher over her new novel, Emma. Henry suddenly becomes ill, and Jane is helped by a young and handsome doctor, Charles Haden, who heals her brother and is able to help secure Emma's publication. Jane is flattered by his attention, and fancies that he admires her for more than her writing. With Fanny's arrival in London, Doctor Haden's attentions turn to her, and Jane becomes sullen and resentful. She returns to Hampshire to continue writing her next novel, but becomes ill herself.

At a family christening, Fanny tells Jane that Mr. Plumptre is engaged to another, and blames Jane for leading her to think him unsuitable. Fanny declares that she will never again trust the opinions of her maiden aunt. Cassandra tries to comfort Jane, but as she becomes weaker, she looks back on her life and wonders if she had made the right choices about love, money, and marriage.

As sickness envelops her, Jane confesses to Cassandra that her only regret about not marrying her rich suitor years ago is that she won't be able to leave Cassandra and her mother financially secure. She admits that everything that she is, and everything she has achieved, has been for her sister, and is much happier than she thought she would be.

In 1820, Cassandra attends Fanny's wedding, alone. At the reception, Fanny seeks Cassandra out only to find her burning the letters that Jane had written to her. Fanny begs her not to destroy them, hoping to finally find the answers to Jane's lost love, but she continues to burn the letters, overcome with grief. As Fanny returns to the party, Jane's words are in her head, telling her to listen to her own heart now. Fanny finally understands her aunt Jane.

== Cast ==
- Olivia Williams as Jane Austen
- Greta Scacchi as Cassandra Austen
- Imogen Poots as Fanny Austen Knight
- Phyllida Law as Mrs. Austen
- Pip Torrens as Edward Austen Knight
- Harry Gostelow as Reverend Charles Papillon
- Samuel Roukin as Harris Bigg
- Tom Hiddleston as John Plumptre
- Hugh Bonneville as Reverend Brook Bridges
- Tom Goodman-Hill as Mr. Lushington MP
- Adrian Edmondson as Henry Austen
- Jack Huston as Dr. Charles Haden
- Jason Watkins as Reverend Clarke
- Sally Tatum as Anna Lefroy
- Sylvie Herbert as Madame Bigeon

== Reception ==
New York Times capsule review: "...the film, despite the hokey title, gives us a moving vision of Austen as a pragmatist who comes to wonder if her aversion to gold-digging might have been ill advised."

Associate Press capsule review: "[...] The story becomes more interesting as it nears its close. The general hubbub that Jane’s mother triggers near the end — questioning whether her daughter’s sacrifice of marriage and safety for principles of love and independence made her happy — legitimately suggests the historical-based possibility that Austen was not as emotionally restrained in her life as she was in her fiction."

Variety capsule review: "Beautifully shot and graced with a splendid performance by Olivia Williams, Jane Austen biopic 'Miss Austen Regrets' focuses on a relatively narrow window in the author’s life, serving as something of a companion to 'Becoming Jane,' the 2007 feature about a young Austen starring Anne Hathaway. It is also, blessedly, less sappy than the Austen adaptations surrounding it within what 'Masterpiece Theater' has christened 'The Complete Jane Austen,'"
