= Black Cab (film) =

2024 film directed by Bruce Goodison

- Promotional release poster
- Directed by: Bruce Goodison
- Written by: Virginia Gilbert
- Produced by: Michaela Fereday; Lucy Robinson; Jan Roldanus
- Starring: Synnøve Karlsen; Luke Norris; Nick Frost
- Distributed by: Shudder
- Release date: 3 October 2024
- Running time: 88 minutes
- Country: United Kingdom
- Language: English
- Box office: $121,122

Black Cab is a 2024 British supernatural horror film directed by Bruce Goodison, starring Synnøve Karlsen, Luke Norris, and Nick Frost. Its plot features a couple who get taken captive by their menacing taxi driver.

== Cast ==
- Synnøve Karlsen as Anne
- Luke Norris as Patrick
- Nick Frost as Ian
- Tilly Woodward as Ghost
- Tessa Parr as Jessica
- George Bukhari as Ryan

== Release ==
Black Cab was screened in the United Kingdom on October 3, 2024 at Grimmfest.

== Reception ==
On the review aggregator website Rotten Tomatoes, 47% of 17 critics' reviews are positive.

Leslie Felperin, writing for The Guardian, gave the film 3 stars out of 5, calling it "rich enough in ideas and strong performances as well as running a blessedly crisp 88 minutes". Grant Hermanns of Screen Rant gave the film a score of 7/10, praising Frost's performance and the visuals while criticizing the story as "underwhelming".
