= Clique (TV series) =

2017 British television series

- Genre: Drama; Psychological thriller
- Created by: Jess Brittain
- Written by: Jess Brittain
- Starring: Synnøve Karlsen; Rachel Hurd-Wood
- Country of origin: United Kingdom
- Original language: English
- No. of series: 2
- No. of episodes: 12

Production
- Executive producers: Christopher Aird; Bryan Elsley
- Running time: 45 minutes
- Production companies: BBC Studios; Balloon Entertainment

Original release
- Network: BBC Three
- Release: 5 March 2017 – 15 December 2018

Clique is a British thriller television series created by Jess Brittain, starring Synnøve Karlsen and Rachel Hurd-Wood. It was released as part of BBC Three's online-only schedule and later aired on BBC One. Series 1 premiered on 5 March 2017 and concluded on 9 April 2017. A second six-part series was ordered in January 2018. It premiered in November 2018 on BBC Three Online.

== Plot ==
=== Series 1 ===
Childhood friends Georgia and Holly are only a few weeks into the so-called best years of their lives at university in Edinburgh, when Georgia gets drawn into an elite clique of alpha girls (Fay, Phoebe, Louise, and Rachel) led by lecturer Jude McDermid. Jude's brand of feminism is alluring, just like the circle of bright students she surrounds herself with. Georgia's effortless entry into the clique leaves Holly out in the cold. However, this soon escalates to panic as Georgia begins acting erratically. Alarmed by this transformation in her best friend, Holly is compelled to follow her into Jude's closely guarded circle. What she discovers is a seductive world of lavish parties, populated by Edinburgh's highest-powered business men and women. But it's a world underpinned by sordid compromise, and as Holly exposes its deeply corrupt core, the danger mounts from all angles, for her and Georgia. Holly's own dark past also threatens to resurface.

=== Series 2 ===
A year after the events of Season 1, Holly is now in her second year of university and living in a house share with Louise and student activists Rayna and Fraser. Holly's exposé of Solasta Finance has led to intense fascination from everyone around her. She encounters a close-knit group of young men, led by charismatic Jack Yorke and finds herself becoming immersed in a campus-wide scandal. Meanwhile, from within a secure unit, Rachel keeps obsessing over Holly.

== Cast and characters ==
=== Main ===
- Synnøve Karlsen as Holly McStay, a highly perceptive and self-assured student at Edinburgh with a dark past.
  - Orla Bayne as young Holly
- Rachel Hurd-Wood as Rachel Maddox, an expert at reading people who shares an affinity with Holly.
  - Grace Greatorex-Watson as young Rachel

=== Supporting ===
- Sophia Brown as Louise "Lou" Taggart (series 1–2), an intelligent and hardworking student from London who is pragmatic about her lack of people skills.
- Ella-Rae Smith as Phoebe Parker-Fox (series 1, guest series 2), a minor aristocrat whose networking skills make up for her lack of financial knowledge.

==== Series 1 ====
- Aisling Franciosi as Georgia Cunningham, a cheerful and optimistic 19-year-old girl, who is Holly's best friend and joins the Solasta Women's Initiative, working in the Client Relations Department of Solasta Finance.
  - Evie Brassington as young Georgia
- Emma Appleton as Fay Brookstone, the first member of Jude's clique, and not quite as happy in it as her peers. She works in the Client Accounts Department of Solasta Finance.
- Louise Brealey as Jude McDermid, an Economics professor and philosopher and co-founder of the Solasta Women's Initiative.
- Emun Elliott as Alistair McDermid, CEO of Solasta Finance, an Edinburgh-based private bank, and co-founder of the Solasta Women's Initiative, which fast-tracks bright women into finance through coveted internships at his bank. He is Jude's older brother.
- Mark Strepan as Rory Sawyer, a banker at Solasta Finance who has a relationship with Holly.
- Jack Bannon as James Buxton, a banker at Solasta Finance, close with Rory and was in a relationship with Fay.
- Chris Fulton as Charlie Lamont-Smith, a banker at Solasta Finance, in a relationship with Phoebe.
- Harris Dickinson as Sam, a musician with whom Holly has a brief relationship.
- Sorcha Groundsell as Elizabeth Smith, an intelligent and observant university student who idolizes the clique and aims to join the Solasta Women's Initiative. She befriends Holly and helps her to uncover the truth.
- Peter Bankole as Mo, a Somali illegal immigrant and a driver for the clique.
- Kåre Conradi as Lukas Steiner, a powerful businessman who works with Alistair and recruits from the Solasta Women's Initiative.

==== Series 2 ====
- Leo Suter as Jack Yorke, the charismatic leader of a clique of boys.
- Nicholas Nunn as Calum McGowan, a member of Jack's clique and his foster brother.
- Barney Harris as Barney Bowen, a member of Jack's clique.
- Jyuddah Jaymes as Aubrey Richardson, a gay American student and a member of Jack's clique.
- Imogen King as Rayna, a friendly housemate of Holly who looks up to her.
- Stuart Campbell as Fraser, a housemate of Holly who likes Rayna.
- Izuka Hoyle as Dani, Lou's new girlfriend who works at Agnes Reid's office.
- Madeleine Worrall as Agnes Reid, an MSP and Jack's mother who is running to become an MP.
- Richard Gadd as Ben Howard, creator of Twitcher, an alternative media website.
- David Robb as Dean Wentworth, the head of the university.
- Faye Castelow as Hettie, Rachel's psychotherapist.
- Fraser Saunders as Jamie, a troubled youth.
- Michael Nardone as Alec McStay, Holly's father.

== Episodes ==
Series	Episodes	Originally released	
Series	Episodes	First released	Last released
1	6	5 March 2017	9 April 2017
2	6	10 November 2018	15 December 2018

=== Series 1 (2017) ===
No. overall	No. in season	Title	Directed by	Written by	Original release date
1	1	"Episode 1"	Robert McKillop	Jess Britain	5 March 2017
Holly and Georgia visit a nightclub and stumble into an elite clique of alpha girls: Fay, Phoebe, Louise, and Rachel. The next day at their first lecture they meet Professor Jude McDermid, a macroeconomics lecturer who is responsible for selecting female students for internships at the mysterious Solasta Finance. Later on, Georgia and Holly run into the alpha girls again. Georgia is upfront about wanting to join them, whilst Holly feels slightly off about the idea. Georgia is invited to a party alongside the clique. Holly follows along and there she hits it off with Rory, another Solasta employee. Upon snooping she finds Fay in a room taking drugs. Holly tries to talk to her, but James, another Solasta employee, interrupts angrily demanding answers, so Fay makes Holly leave. Georgia starts to lose touch with Holly and disappears. When Holly randomly gets a desperate call from her, she goes looking at the clique's house and finds Fay bleeding in the bath and saves her from a suicide attempt. Fay is taken to hospital, but when Holly visits her and runs into Jude, Fay kills herself by jumping out of the window and landing on the car behind them.
2	2	"Episode 2"	Robert McKillop	Jess Britain	12 March 2017
It's Fay's funeral and Holly again runs into James and Rory, who appear to be covering something up. Holly begins to see ghostly hallucinations of Fay, and has flashbacks to something she did in her past. She tracks down Georgia, who has taken Fay's place in the clique's house. Holly invites Sam over to her dorm but ends up going with Rory to a Solasta fundraiser, which Georgia and the other girls are also attending. They encourage her to take cocaine. Holly gets increasingly frustrated at Georgia's avoidance and throws up in front of an important guest - but when she gets home she meets Jude, who tells her that she's in.
3	3	"Episode 3"	Robert McKillop	Jess Britain & Milly Thomas	19 March 2017
The episode opens with a flashback to Holly's childhood, where she walks to the edge of a cliff with a group of her friends. In the present day, she receives an email from James, warning her about Solasta. She moves into the house and learns more about the other girls, who appear to be unfazed about Fay's death. Georgia lands the coveted Steiner account, but has a panic attack and seems increasingly detached. Holly learns that James and Fay were fiddling client background checks for Solasta. She confronts Alastair Mcdermid about the information, but he claims they were both acting alone. At the end of the episode, James's body is dragged out of the Firth of Forth river estuary.
4	4	"Episode 4"	Andrea Harkin	Jess Britain & Kirstie Swain	26 March 2017
Holly learns that Rory is actually an undercover police officer trying to bring down Solasta from the inside, and that Steiner is a criminal whose money Solasta has been cleaning. Holly receives a posthumous video message from Fay which reveals the secret behind the top job on the Steiner account, that she is raped by Steiner and Alastair. Rory tells Holly to get out while she can, but Holly is determined to save Georgia. It is revealed that Georgia 'saved' Holly as a child by befriending her when she was ostracised by her group of friends, due to Holly convincing a friend's annoying little sister to jump off a cliff edge into the sea as part of a twisted initiation to their group. A reckless choice and tragic outcome that's haunted Holly ever since.
5	5	"Episode 5"	Andrea Harkin	Jess Britain	2 April 2017
Holly attempts to bring down Solasta by airing Fay's video during an open day, but it doesn't have the effect that she'd hoped. Rory frantically asks Holly to let him take care of things and says he'll hand over her evidence to the police. When he finds out about a secret flat that James and Fay shared, he immediately goes to investigate, and Holly finds out that he hasn't been following up the investigation into Solasta. She follows Rory to the flat and confronts him, but he loses control, revealing that he killed James, and attempts to strangle her. She is saved at the last minute by Rachel, who appears and kills Rory by repeated blows to the head.
6	6	"Episode 6"	Andrea Harkin	Jess Britain	9 April 2017
Leaving Rory's dead body in the flat, Rachel takes Holly away to clean up. Afterwards, Rachel goes to Alistair and sets him up by leading him to the flat where she arranges a policeman to catch him with Rory's body. Holly realises that Rachel was one of her childhood friends who witnessed her crime, but unlike Holly's guilt, Rachel gets a buzz out of killing. Rachel reveals that she killed Fay by pushing her off the hospital roof, and that she was the one sending the messages to Holly all along. She takes Holly to Alastair's beach house, where she finds Georgia drugged and unstable. Elizabeth goes to Jude to enlighten her about Rachel, and Jude points out that she pushed Holly forward to the Women’s Initiative. She is later called by Alistair, who was arrested when he was caught at the flat. Telling Jude that Rachel set him up and that she took the beach house keys forces her to call the police. On a cliff, Rachel brings a knife and tries to recreate the death of the little girl with Georgia instead, forcing Holly to join in. Holly instead pushes Georgia and jumps off with her into the sea. When they swim onto the beach, Rachel attacks them, but Holly restrains her. The police arrive in time with Jude to arrest her. Later on, during the second term, Elizabeth has moved in with the girls. Holly visits Rachel in a secure location, supposedly a prison.

=== Series 2 (2018) ===
No. overall	No. in season	Title	Directed by	Written by	Original release date
7	1	"Episode 1"	Andrew Cumming	Jess Britain	10 November 2018
Holly is back for her second year of university. She's tough and doesn't need anyone fighting her battles. Holly lives with her friend Louise and two new younger students - Rayna and Fraser - who are fascinated by the events of last year but Holly just wants to keep her distance and move on. Holly meets a group of boys who aren't afraid to challenge their university peers and call out figures of authority. Led by the enigmatic Jack, Holly finds herself drawn towards this new Clique, but there is something strange about them that she can't quite figure out. But a shocking event will make it impossible for Holly to stay in the shadows.
8	2	"Episode 2"	Andrew Cumming	Unknown	17 November 2018
Holly is shocked after the brutal attack. The boys close ranks as blame is placed at their door and Holly and Jack's new relationship is tested. Louise finds a place to fight for what she believes at activist group Women Rise and meets charismatic politician Agnes Reid, who has a personal connection to events. Meanwhile, the boys find themselves ever more entwined with Twitcher, the alternative media organisation led by Ben Howard. Holly finds herself caught between both groups in her search for the truth. When she asks for help from an old friend, is she heading into more danger?
9	3	"Episode 3"	Andrew Cumming	Unknown	24 November 2018
With Rayna missing, Holly finds herself desperate to discover the truth of that night. When the university acts to punish the boys and expels Jack on the basis of an accusation, they go to town on the Dean of Students finding he has some skeletons in his own closet. Unable to ignore corruption, Holly finds herself running with the boys - but are they mischievous or dangerous? Louise starts to question the beliefs she's defended so hard. Is everything Rayna's told Holly true? Is Agnes hiding more than corruption? While everyone wrestles with their version of the truth, the events of that night on the beach take an awful toll.
10	4	"Episode 4"	Robert McKillop	Jess Brittain	1 December 2018
The university campus is reeling from shocking news. With new evidence, Holly and Jack come together in search for the person who could hold the key to the mystery of the night on the beach. Rayna buckles under the weight of her actions and finally the awful truth of Freshers Night comes to light. Ben sets his sights on Agnes Reid. As the election approaches, it's Twitcher vs Forward with a furious Jack as Ben's perfect weapon. Rachel finds new ways to reach into lives beyond the secure unit and Louise finds herself hot on the trail of a very dangerous secret.
11	5	"Episode 5"	Unknown	Unknown	8 December 2018
With the police moving slowly, Holly decides to take matters into her own hands - seeking retribution from those she believes are responsible and advice from old friends. But as she gets closer to the truth, Holly realises that she will have to take matters into her own hands. Jack is haunted by doubts about his own innocence in events. Ben tries to help but only Jack's family know the truth about his demons. Holly's mission becomes chillingly clear and before long, some familiar faces will join her for a reckoning.
12	6	"Episode 6"	Robert McKillop	Jess Brittain	15 December 2018
Holly is about to shoot Jack dead, but changes her mind at the last second. In the midst of Holly and Rachel's struggle for the gun, Jack jumps off the boat. Meanwhile, Ben and Barney start a Twitcher campaign against Rayna. Holly tells Rachel to stay in the house, for her own safety, but promises to leave with her once this is all over. Holly then goes with Rayna to Ben's rally, where they find Aubrey, who is disillusioned with Twitcher. Suspecting Ben again, Holly tells Aubrey and Rayna to find his tablet while she goes to meet Callum. Aubrey and Rayna fail to find the tablet, but realise that it was Callum, not Jack, who raped Rayna on Freshers' Night. Callum reveals to Holly that he is Will, and that he didn't want Jack between him and Agnes. Holly finds out that Callum drugged and locked up Agnes, and helps her escape. Jack arrives at Holly's house to talk to her, but finds only Rachel, who holds him at gunpoint. Rachel and Holly bring Jack and Agnes to Twitcher HQ. Holly again refuses to kill Jack, and despite her pleading, Rachel leaves. Rayna confronts Ben's rally on live TV, admitting to her wrongdoings but standing up for herself and causing Ben's campaign to fall apart. Shortly after, Rachel kills Ben. Holly lures Callum out and reveals his deeds to Jack and Agnes, including how he engineered rifts between them, killed Louise and repeatedly drugged Jack (causing his blackouts). Callum admits to also doctoring the recording. After Agnes rejects him and reconciles with Jack, Callum kills himself. By phone, Holly promises Rachel that she'll find her, but Rachel tells her that they need some time apart. They both then confess their love for each other. Holly visits her dad with Rayna and recalls her last conversation with Rachel.

== Broadcast and release ==
Clique first aired on BBC Three week-by-week for its six-episode run in from 5 March to 9 April 2017. It then aired on BBC One from 20 May to 3 June 2017. As of 2018 Clique is broadcast in the United States on Pop; in Spain it is broadcast on HBO; in Greece by State ERT; and in Germany on ARD's channel one.

=== Home media ===
On 8 May 2017, the first series of Clique was released on DVD.
