= Synnøve Karlsen =

Scottish actress (born 1996)

- Born: 30 July 1996 (age 30); Glasgow, Scotland
- Education: London Academy of Music and Dramatic Art; Guildhall School of Music and Drama
- Occupation: Actress
- Years active: 2017–present

Synnøve Karlsen (UK: /sɪˈnɜːvə/) (born 30 July 1996) is a Scottish actress. On television, she is known for her roles in the BBC series Clique (2017–2018) and Miss Austen (2025), and the Rai 1 series Medici (2018–2019). Her films include Last Night in Soho (2021).

== Early life and education ==
Karlsen was born in Glasgow, Scotland, and raised in Helensburgh before her family relocated to London when she was 12 years old. She is of Norwegian descent. She has three older brothers and is the niece of Elizabeth Karlsen and Stephen Woolley. She studied at the London Academy of Music and Dramatic Art and then the Guildhall School of Music and Drama, leaving after a year upon being cast in Clique.

== Career ==
=== Film ===
Year	Title	Role	Notes
2017	V	Minnie	Short film
2018	Dead Birds	Rose	Short film
2021	Last Night in Soho	"Hurricane" Jocasta	
2024	Black Cab	Anne	

=== Television ===
Year	Title	Role	Notes
2017–2018	Clique	Holly McStay	Main cast
2018–2019	Medici	Clarice Orsini	Main cast (seasons 2—3)
2022	The Midwich Cuckoos	Cassie Stone	Main cast
2023	Bodies	Polly Hillinghead	Main cast
2025	Miss Austen	Young Cassandra "Cassy" Austen	Limited series, main cast
2025	Foundation	Bayta Mallow	Recurring, season 3

=== Stage ===
She has performed at the Edinburgh Fringe Festival. In 2025 Karlsen made her New York theatrical debut in Gingold Theatrical Group's Bernard Shaw's Pygmalion as Eliza Doolittle . For her performance as Eliza, she was nominated for Outstanding Lead Performance in a Play at the 70th Drama Desk Awards.

== Awards and nominations ==
Year	Award	Category	Nominated work	Result	Ref.
2026	Drama Desk Awards	Outstanding Lead Performance in a Play	Pygmalion	Nominated	
