= Our World War =

2014 British television series

- Genre: Factual; Historical drama
- Written by: Joe Barton
- Directed by: Bruce Goodison; Ben Chanan
- Starring: Jefferson Hall; Dominic Thorburn; Theo Barklem-Biggs; Calum Callaghan; Luke Tittensor; Paul Popplewell; Michael Socha; Lewis Reeves; Stuart Graham; Hannah Britland; Gerard Kearns; Luke Norris; Chris Reilly; Shaun Dooley; Danny Walters
- Theme music composer: Jon Opstad
- Country of origin: United Kingdom
- Original language: English
- No. of series: 1
- No. of episodes: 3 (list of episodes)

Production
- Executive producer: Colin Barr
- Producer: Susan Horth
- Running time: 60 minutes
- Production company: BBC Documentaries

Original release
- Network: BBC Three
- Release: 7 August – 21 August 2014

Our World War is a 2014 British three-part television drama based on first hand accounts of the soldiers who served in the First World War and how it affected people on the battlefield. The show was created by Joe Barton and directed by Bruce Goodison and Ben Chanan and was inspired by the 2012 BAFTA-winning series Our War. Episodes first aired on BBC Three on 7 August 2014 and concluded on 21 August, the release show was released as part of the 100 year commemoration of the beginning of the First World War.

The series featured three hour-long episodes featuring different accounts and stories and starring a new cast per each episode. The series starred such actors as Luke Tittensor, Jefferson Hall, Gerard Kearns, Michael Socha, Danny Walters, Dominic Thorburn and Theo Barklem-Biggs.

== Production ==
The series makes use of modern film techniques like fixed, body-mounted cameras and overhead battle scene animations, alongside a modern soundtrack featuring artists such as PJ Harvey, to attract a new audience. Parts of episode one were filmed at The Historic Dockyard in Chatham, Kent which doubled as the British HQ in Mons.

== Cast ==
=== The First Day ===
- Jefferson Hall as Fred Steele
- Dominic Thorburn as Maurice Dease
- Theo Barklem-Biggs as Sid Godley
- Calum Callaghan as Billy Holdbrook
- Sion Daniel Young as Sapper Neary
- Julian Michael Deuster as Von Armin
- Brian Ferguson as Charles Jarvis
- Daniel Kendrick as Neville
- Frankie Wilson as Frank
- Stephen Leask as Supply Officer

=== Pals ===
- Luke Tittensor as Paddy Kennedy
- Stuart Graham as Father Brookes
- Michael Socha as Private Andy Andrews
- Lewis Reeves as Henry Delaney
- Paul Popplewell as Sergeant Mitchell
- Hannah Britland as Lizzie
- Bobby Schofield as Tom Andrews
- Chris Mason as William Hunt
- Sandy Batchelor as Angus Crombie
- Andrew MacBean as Regimental Sergeant Major
- Steven F Thompson as German Lieutenant
- Matthew Brett as Murphy
- Rory Trainor as Bromage
- Michael Peavoy as Private Wiltshire
- Laurie Kynaston as Young British soldier
- Bradley Gray as 16th Manc Pals soldier
- Jason Bilston as Background Doctor

=== War Machine ===
- Gerard Kearns as Chas Rowland
- Danny Walters as Mike Weston
- Luke Norris as Lt. Mold
- Chris Reilly as Dodds
- Shaun Dooley as Fred Firth
- John Hollingworth as Lt. Cohen
- Niall McNamee as Burns
- Sholto Morgan as Dawson
- Kyle Evans as O'Brien
- Ryan Kiggell as Officer
- Anna Bolton as Anne
- James Wilson as German Boy
- Alex Brock as Young British officer
- Paul Dellow as German soldier

== Episode list ==
No.	Title	Directed by	Written by	Original release date
1	"The First Day"	Bruce Goodison	Joe Barton	7 August 2014
Two weeks after war is declared, the 4th Battalion of The Royal Fusiliers set up defences around the Belgian town of Mons. They expect to march beyond the town's bridges the next morning. Little do they know, however, the German army has already reached the other side of the canal.
2	"Pals"	Ben Chanan	Joe Barton	14 August 2014
A group of office workers from Levenshulme, Manchester join a local Pals battalion, the 18th Battalion, Manchester Regiment. They soon find themselves facing the Germans at the Somme. Months later, Paddy Kennedy pleads with the battalion chaplain to let him off the firing squad duty that will see him killing one of the friends he made on his journey.
3	"War Machine"	Bruce Goodison	Joe Barton	21 August 2014
Four years into the war, the British deploy tanks along the German border, to break the stalemate. A young Chas Rowland joins the crew of one of these tanks, the Niveleur, as it prepares for the Battle of Amiens. But the coming days will take their toll on the crew, and Chas must brave fumes, a temperamental engine, and cramped conditions to deliver a message home.

== Reception ==
While some reviewers described the soundtrack choice as "powerful" and "beautiful", others felt it trivialised the subject matter and would quickly date.
