= Bruce Goodison =

British director

- Born: Bruce Goodison
- Occupations: Filmmaker, Writer, Director
- Years active: 1989–present
- Website: https://www.indefinitefilms.co.uk/

Bruce Goodison is one of UK’s drama directors, recognized with BAFTA, RTS, and Emmy honors for his morally complex and character-driven films. His debut feature Leave to Remain won international awards and featured a soundtrack by Alt-J. He has directed acclaimed works such as Murdered by My Father (which earned Adeel Akhtar a historic BAFTA), Born to Kill, and Doctor Foster, each earning major awards for their leads. His documentaries and dramas, including Flight 93, Our War, and SAS: Iranian Embassy Siege, have received BAFTA and Grierson recognition. Most recently, he directed Then Barbara Met Alan and the ghost film Black Cab, continuing his reputation as one of Britain’s most accomplished storytellers.

== Career ==
Goodison started out as a street photographer. His daughter, Camilla, died when he was 23.

His projects span acclaimed films and series such as Murdered by My Father, Doctor Foster, Born to Kill, and Our War, featuring standout performances by actors like Adeel Akhtar, Maxine Peake, and John Boyega.

He currently co-runs Indefinite Films with producer Kate Cook.

== Filmography ==
=== Films ===
Year	Title	Role	Notes	Refs.
2013	Held Hostage: The in Amenas Ordeal	Director		
2013	Leave to Remain	Director		
2016	Murdered by My Father	Director		
2022	Then Barbara Met Alan	Director		
2024	Black Cab	Director		
2025	Girl Next Door	Writer, Director		

=== Television ===
Year	Title	Role	Notes	Refs.
2014	Our World War	Director		
2015	Doctor Foster: A Woman Scorned	Director	Episode 4 and 5 of Season 1	
2017	Born to Kill	Director	Episode 1-4 of Season 1	

== Awards and nominations ==
Year	Award	Work	Category	Result	Ref.
2003	British Academy Television Award	SAS: Iranian Embassy Siege	Flaherty Documentary Award (TV)	Nominated	
2015	British Academy Television Award	Our World War	Best Mini-Series	Nominated	
2017	British Academy Television Award	Murdered by My Father	Best Single Drama	Nominated	
2025	Royal Television Society West of England Awards	D-Day: The Unheard Tapes	Factual	Won	
