= Gingold Theatrical Group =

New York-based theatre company

- GTG
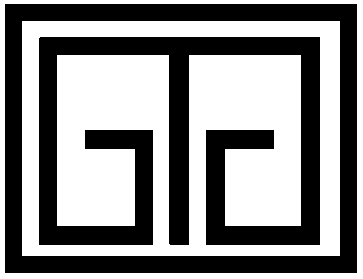
- Address: 520 Eighth Avenue #304; New York
- Location: Midtown Manhattan, New York City
- Type: Non-profit theatre company

Construction
- Opened: 2006

Website
- gingoldgroup.org

Gingold Theatrical Group, often abbreviated as GTG, is a New York-based non-profit theatre company. It was founded in 2006 by American actor and director David Staller. Its mission is to present works that carry the humanitarian values of writer and critic George Bernard Shaw. It presents several series, including the annual festival Shaw New York, and the monthly series of staged readings, Project Shaw. Through this series, GTG became the first theatre group to present all 65 of George Bernard Shaw's plays.

== History and description ==
Gingold Theatrical Group is a Manhattan-based theatre company under the Artistic Direction of David Staller, who founded the group in 2006. Staller believed that the English playwright and critic, George Bernard Shaw, created work that made the strongest statements on human rights. He named the group after his friend Hermione Gingold, together with whom he read Shaw's plays.

=== Project Shaw ===
Staller began the group's work with staged readings of plays either by Shaw, his contemporaries, or those inspired by him. The series, Project Shaw, presents 11 staged readings a year. Each of these staged readings are either plays by or inspired by George Bernard Shaw. In 2009, Gingold Theatrical Group became the first theatre group to have produced all 65 of George Bernard Shaw's plays through Project Shaw. Initially held at New York's Players' Club, the performances were moved to a larger venue at New York's Symphony Space in 2014.

On January 19, 2015, Project Shaw held its 100th performance. As of July 2017, 124 Project Shaw had presented 124 concert productions.

=== Shaw New York ===
In 2012, the group began to hold an annual festival called Shaw New York. Here, they produce a fully staged production, together with symposiums, concerts, and staged readings. They began the annual festival with their production of Shaw's Man and Superman, which was a New York Times Critics' Pick. The play was co-produced by The Irish Repertory Theatre and was extended past its initial limited engagement. Since then, GTG has presented Shaw's You Never Can Tell and Major Barbara in a co-production with The Pearl Theatre, and Shaw's Widowers' Houses with The Actors Company Theatre.

In October 2022 David Staller directed GTG's production of Candida at New York City's Theater Row. It was "funny last-paced one-act feminist rom-com" and "wild and witty whirlwind of a story" reset from a London suburb to a 1929 Harlem Renaissance home with a mostly African- American cast. In 2023, GTG revived Shaw's Arms and the Man featuring longtime Gingold collabroator Tony Award-winning actress Karen Ziemba. Following their success, GTG presented a newly adapted production of The Devil's Disciple both adapted and under the direction of David Staller. The production featured five women to play all the roles, the production went on to receive a nomination for Best Adaption at the 69th Annual Drama Desk Awards.

To celebrated their 20th anniversary, Gingold revived Shaw's most notable work, Pygmalion. Starring Synnøve Karlsen in her New York theatrical debut, the cast also featured Mark Evans as Henry Higgins, Carson Elrod as Pickering, Teresa Avia Lim as Clara and Mary, Lizan Mitchell as Mrs. Pearce and Mrs. Higgins, and Matt Wolpe as Freddy and Alfred Doolittle. Karlsen's performance was nominated at the 70th Annual Drama Desk Awards.

=== New works ===
GTG currently holds two programs which focus on the development of new works. The first program, Press Cuttings, was inspired by Shaw's career. Prior to becoming a playwright, Shaw was an art critic. The program's focus is to develop the works of art critics looking to follow in Shaw's footsteps. This program led to the development of David Cote's play Otherland.

In 2017, GTG announced another program, Speakers' Corner, in which a group of writers of diverse backgrounds develops new work inspired by narratives of George Bernard Shaw.

== Response ==
In New York, Jesse Green stated that "Gingold Theatrical Group provides an invaluable – and unique – service to New Yorkers. Not only does it keep topnotch productions of great works of art before the public on a regular basis as no other theater company can, but it also does something less obvious. It keeps the tradition of intelligent argument, embodied in Shaw's plays but otherwise much lacking from public discourse, alive for those who need it most: the thinking people of a great city."

In a 2012 review of Man and Superman, Andy Webster of The New York Times said that Staller's "fluency is apparent. … In its intellectual energy and exhilarating vivacity, this production honors Shaw’s life force as well."

Michael Musto stated, "David Staller's Project Shaw is an invaluable testament to the beauty of Shaw's work... Anyone who cares about theater and history treasures this project."

== Off-Broadway productions ==
Year	Production	Featuring	Ref
2012	Man and Superman	Will Bradley, Janie Brookshire, Jonathan Hammond, Evan Zes, Laurie Kennedy, Max Gordon Moore, Brian Murray, Paul O’Brien, Brian Sgambati, Zachary Spicer, Margaret Robinson	
2013	You Never Can Tell	Robin Leslie Brown, Bradford Cover, Dominic Cuskern, Dan Daily, Sean McNall, Ben Charles, Amelia Pedlow, Zachary Spicer, Emma Wisniewski	
2014	Major Barbara	Robin Leslie Brown, Bradford Cover, Dan Daily, Carol Schultz, Becky Baumwoll, Hannah Cabell, Cary Donaldson, Richard Gallagher, Alec Shaw	
2016	Widowers' Houses	Jeremy Beck, Hannah Cheek, Jonathan Hadley, Terry Layman, Talene Monahon, John Plumpis	
2018	Heartbreak House	Kimberly Immanuel, Jeff Hiller, Raphael Nash Thompson, Karen Ziemba, Alison Fraser, Lenny Wolpe, Tom Hewitt, Derek Smith	
2019	Caesar & Cleopatra	Robert Cuccioli, Teresa Avia Lim, Brenda Braxton, Jeff Applegate, Jonathan Hadley, Rajesh Bose, Dan Domingues	
2021	Mrs. Warren's Profession	Karen Ziemba, Nicole King, Robert Cuccioli, David Lee Huynh, Alvin Keith, Raphael Nash Thompson	
2022	Candida	R.J. Foster, Peter Romano, David Ryan Smith, Avanthika Srinivasan, Amber Reauchean Williams, Avery Whitted	
2023	Arms and the Man	Shanel Bailey, Delphi Borich, Ben Davis, Kesav Moodliar, Thomas Jay Ryan, Evan Zes, Karen Ziemba	
2024	The Devil's Disciple	Nadia Brown, Susan Cella, Tina Chilip, Teresa Avia Lim, Folami Williams	
2025	Pygmalion	Synnøve Karlsen, Mark Evans, Carson Elrod, Teresa Avia Lim, Lizan Mitchell	
2026	Village Wooing	Beth Leavel, Karen Ziemba, Robert Cuccioli, Tom Hewitt	

== Speaker's Corner alumni ==
Writer	Play	Ref
Kate Douglas	The Apiary	
Seth McNeill	Untitled Conspiracy Play	
Sophie Sagan-Gutherz	The Scold's Bridle	
Aeneas Hemphill	Karma Sutra Chai Tea Latte	
Divya Mangwani	Vigil-Aunties	
Marcus Scott	There Goes the Neighborhood	
Mallory Jane Weiss	Howl From Up High	
Max Yu	Call Me Comrade	
Gloria Oladipo	I Wanna Kill, Annie G	
Ruth Geye	How Can I Help You?	
Kaela Mei-Shing Garvin	Ping Pong Play	

== Awards and nominations ==
Year	Award	Category	Nominated work	Result
2025	Drama Desk Awards	Outstanding Adaptation	The Devil's Disciple	Nominated
2026	Drama Desk Awards	Outstanding Lead Performance in a Play (Synnøve Karlsen)	Pygmalion	Nominated
