= Continuator =

Writer who creates a new work based on someone else's prior text

A continuator, in literature, is a writer who creates a new work based on someone else's prior text, such as a novel or novel fragment. The new work may complete the older work (as with the numerous continuations of Jane Austen's unfinished novel Sanditon), or may try to serve as a sequel or prequel to the older work (such as Alexandra Ripley's Scarlett, an authorized continuation of Margaret Mitchell's Gone with the Wind). This phenomenon differs from those authors who, because they share a common culture, use characters or themes from a common cultural stock.

== History ==
The development of European classical literature out of the common stock of oral tradition proved conducive to reworkings, revisions, and satires. Numerous writers of Greece's golden age revived and reworked stories of the Trojan War and Greek mythology, although they were not strictly continuators as, for the most part, they did not invent or even extrapolate much from the received stories, choosing to alter the tone and treatment rather than the stories.

Latin literature, on the other hand, may be regarded as systematic continuators of Greek models. The pinnacle of Augustan literature, the Aeneid, is essentially a continuation of the Iliad: not only in that it follows a minor character from his imagined origins in Troy to his founding of Rome, but in that it continues a historical ethos. This move, by connecting the Roman empire both culturally and pseudo-historically to the Homeric myth, is commonly viewed as a move by Virgil to legitimize the Roman empire. For instance, the epic opens with a summary of the progress of Aeneas and his progeny (in John Dryden's translation):

Arms, and the man I sing, who, forc'd by fate,
And haughty Juno's unrelenting hate,
Expel'd and exil'd, left the Trojan shore.
Long labors, both by sea and land, he bore,
And in the doubtful war, before he won
The Latian realm, and built the destin'd town;
His banish'd gods restor'd to rites divine,
And settled sure succession in his line,
From whence the race of Alban fathers come,
And the long glories of majestic Rome.

W. A. Camps expresses this common analysis of Virgil when he writes, "There is more than one reminder in the poem that its hero Aeneas is ancestor of Octavian through the supposed descent of the Julii [i.e., Octavian's family] through Aeneas' son Julius."

Like their medieval predecessors, Renaissance authors drew inspiration from earlier writers. More significantly, the spread of printing, slow increase in literacy, and the development of capitalism conspired to shape a modern concept of text and authorship. In this context, one sees "continuators" in the modern sense: authors either inspired or hired to complete or continue a predecessor's concept. This habit was most noticeable in the most commercialized spheres of literature. Elizabethan drama, for example, is full of examples. As an instance of completion, Francis Godolphin Waldron completed The Sad Shepherd, a late unfinished play by Ben Jonson. As an instance of sequel-writing, John Fletcher's The Tamer Tamed continues and lampoons Shakespeare's The Taming of the Shrew. Controversial literature was amenable to such continuations, as evidenced most especially by the Martin Marprelate affair; Philip Sidney's Arcadia was continued by Anna Weamys.

=== Derlethian traditionalism ===
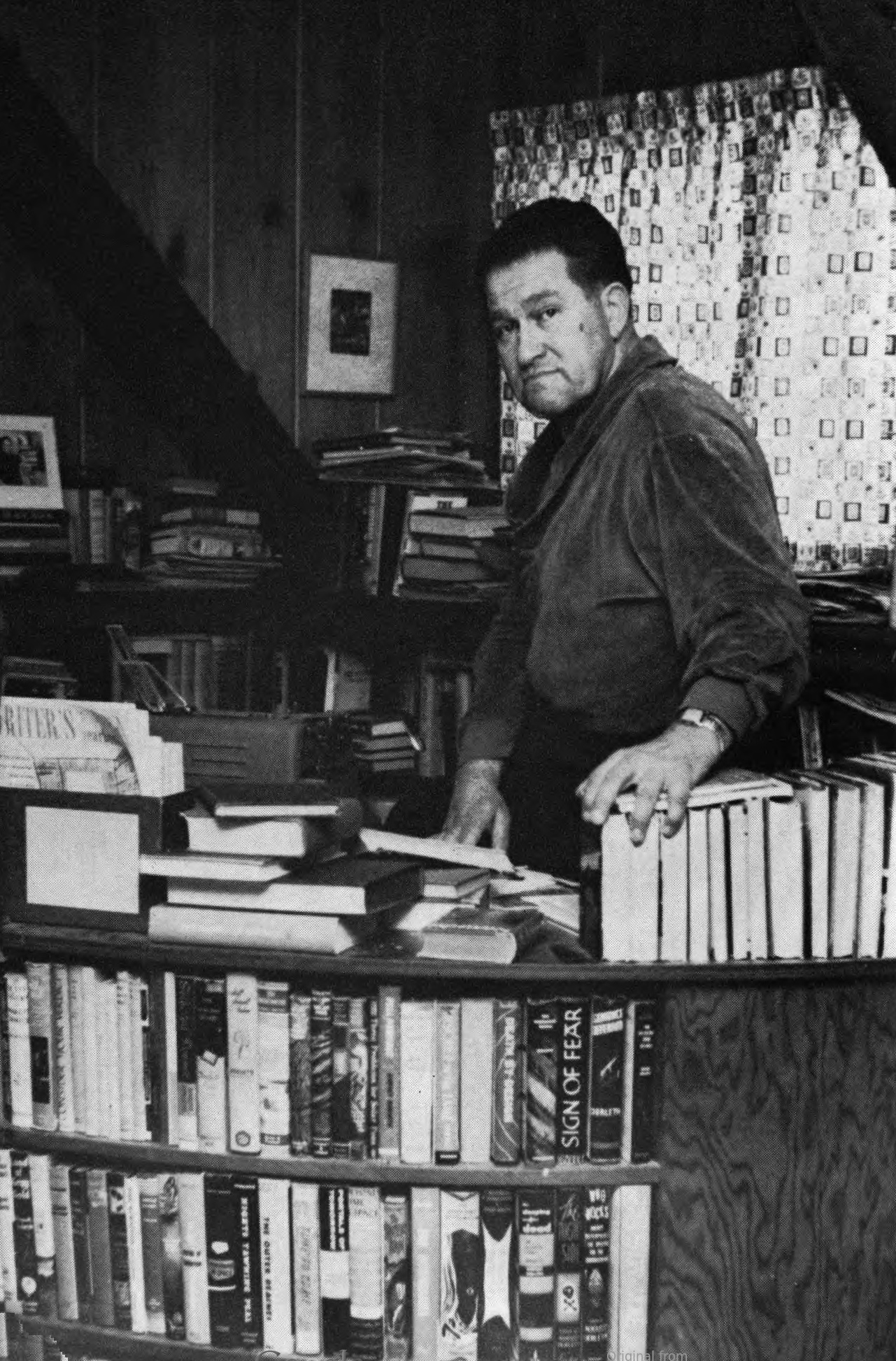
August Derleth used the Lovecraft name to promote his own work.

A controversial example of continuation work is that of August Derleth in "completing" fragments left by H. P. Lovecraft. After Lovecraft's death in 1937, Derleth- who had been close to him- began publishing "collaborations" he claimed to have written with Lovecraft. These sometimes made use of unfinished fragments, but often Derleth was simply taking vague outlines or story ideas from Lovecraft's commonplace book, writing original fiction, and then advertising the work as collaborative. Lovecraft's "contribution" to these stories ranged from 1,200 words to as little as a single sentence; Derleth was simply using the Lovecraft name to drive sales. He also greatly misinterpreted the Cthulhu Mythos by introducing conceptual elements such as a struggle between good and evil, which was not present in Lovecraft's material.

As only he and Donald Wandrei had custody of Lovecraft's physical records, the full scope of Derleth's actions was not apparent until after he died in 1971. Richard L. Tierney's 1972 paper "The Derleth Mythos" offered the first step in correcting the historical record. It caused a decade-long debate among Lovecraft scholars; between Derlethian traditionalists, which acknowledged Derleth's contributions, and those that supported a more thorough, broader review of the Lovecraft corpus. By the early 1980s Derleth's actions became widely understood, many of his academic arguments became poorly regarded, and Derlethian traditionalism faded from discourse. The 16 "collaborations" are no longer considered Lovecraft works by modern scholarship. Some publications as late as the 2000s make the error of recording these works as genuine Lovecraft writings.

Other authors have since used Lovecraft's commonplace book as a starting point for original fiction, such as a 2010 community writing project helmed by Joseph Fink. This project was open about its sources however, and did not make authorship claims as Derleth had years before.

== See also ==
- Continuation novel
- List of incomplete novels finished by other authors
- Tintin and Alph-Art

== Notes ==
1. Camps, W. A. An Introduction to Virgil's Aeneid, Oxford: Oxford University Press, 1969, 1–2.

== Sources ==
- Boitani, Piero (1989). The European Tragedy of Troilus. Oxford: Clarendon Press.
- Boyle, A. J., ed (1988). The Imperial Muse: Ramus Essays on Roman literature of the Empire to Juvenal through Ovid. Berwick, Australia: Aureal Publications.
- Braunmuller, A. R. (1990) "The Arts of the Dramatist." Cambridge Companion to Renaissance Drama. A.R. Braunmuller and Daniel Hattaway, eds. Cambridge: Cambridge University Press. 53–92.
- Cairns, Francis (1989). Virgil's Augustan Epic. Cambridge: Cambridge University Press.
- Chambers, E. K. (1923). The Elizabethan Stage. 4 vol. Oxford: Clarendon Press.
- Clark, Sandra (1994). The Plays of Beaumont and Fletcher: Sexual Themes and Dramatic Representation. New York: Harvester Wheatsheaf.
- Greg, W. W. (1905). Ben Jonson's The Sad Shepherd, with Francis Waldron's Continuation. Materialien zur Kunde des älteren englischen dramasche. Louvain: A. Uystpruyst.
- Joshi, S. T. (1984). "The Development of Lovecraftian Studies 1971–1982 (Part I)". Lovecraft Studies. 3 (2): 62–71. ISSN 0899-8361.
- Joshi, S. T. (1985a). "The Development of Lovecraftian Studies, 1971–1982 (Part II)". Lovecraft Studies. 4 (1): 18–28. ISSN 0899-8361.
- Joshi, S. T. (1985b). "The Development of Lovecraftian Studies, 1971–1982 (Part III)". Lovecraft Studies. 4 (2): 54–65. ISSN 0899-8361.
- Joshi, S. T. (1996). H. P. Lovecraft: A Life. West Warwick, Rhode Island: Necronomicon Press. ISBN 0-940884-89-5. OCLC 34906142.
- Knutson, Roslyn (2001). Playing Companies and Commerce in Shakespeare's Time. Cambridge: Cambridge University Press.
- Smith, Alden (1997). Poetic Allusion and Poetic Embrace in Ovid and Vergil. Ann Arbor, Mich.: University of Michigan Press.
- Weamys, Anna (1994). A Continuation of Sir Philip Sidney's Arcadia. *Patrick Cullen Colborn, ed. Women Writers in English, 1350–1850. Oxford: Oxford University Press.
