= 1971 Governor General's Awards =

Canadian literary award

Each winner of the 1971 Governor General's Awards for Literary Merit was selected by a panel of judges administered by the Canada Council for the Arts. The winners were given a $2500 cash prize.

== Winners ==
=== English Language ===
- Fiction: Mordecai Richler, St. Urbain's Horseman.
- Poetry or Drama: John Glassco, Selected Poems.
- Non-Fiction: Pierre Berton, The Last Spike.

=== French Language ===
- Fiction: Gérard Bessette, Le cycle.
- Poetry or Drama: Paul-Marie Lapointe, Le Réel Absolu.
- Non-Fiction: Gérald Fortin, La Fin d'une Règine.
