= Rachel Hunter (author) =

English novelist (c. 1754 – 1813)

Rachel Hunter (c. 1754 – 1813) was an English woman novelist of the early 19th century who lived and worked in Norwich. She was a contemporary of Jane Austen.

== Literary setting ==
Rachel Hunter wrote for the same circulating library readership as Jane Austen, and like the latter she might belittle standard novel conventions in writings like Letitia. Her writings were well known in the Austen circle, one acquaintance describing a state of well-being as "quite Palmerstone", after Hunter's Letters from Mrs Palmerstone.

Jane's niece Anna Austen had her aunt in stitches by reading passages from Lady Maclean, where the protagonists were always in floods of tears; and Jane herself composed a mock fan-letter to "Mrs Hunter of Norwich...Miss Jane Austen's tears have flowed over each sweet sketch in such a way as would do Mrs Hunter's heart good to see".

== Works ==
- Letitia, or, The Castle without a Spectre (1801)
- The History of the Grubthorpe Family (1802)
- Letters from Mrs Palmerstone to her Daughter, Inculcating Morality by Entertaining Narratives (1803)
- The Unexpected Legacy (1804)
- Lady Maclairn, the Victim of Villany (1806)
- Family Annals (1807)
- The Schoolmistress (1811)
