= Crocodile (Black Mirror) =

- Black Mirror episode
- Promotional poster released as part of the "13 Days of Black Mirror"
- Episode no.: Series 4 Episode 3
- Directed by: John Hillcoat
- Written by: Charlie Brooker
- Cinematography by: Lol Crawley
- Editing by: Tom Lindsay
- Original release date: 29 December 2017
- Running time: 59 minutes

Guest appearances
- Andrea Riseborough as Mia Nolan; Kiran Sonia Sawar as Shazia Akhand; Andrew Gower as Rob; Anthony Welsh as Anan Akhand; Claire Rushbrook as Detective

Episode chronology
← Previous "Arkangel"	Next → "Hang the DJ"

"Crocodile" is the third episode of the fourth series of the anthology series Black Mirror. It was written by series creator Charlie Brooker and directed by John Hillcoat. The episode first aired on Netflix, along with the rest of series four, on 29 December 2017.

The episode follows Mia (Andrea Riseborough) fifteen years after she helped her friend Rob (Andrew Gower) cover up a hit-and-run death, as she commits several murders in order to cover up her past crimes. Meanwhile, Shazia (Kiran Sonia Sawar) is an insurance investigator who uses a "Recaller" that can project people's visual memories onto a screen. The writers were inspired by Nordic noir and by a similar memory technology in series one's "The Entire History of You". The first draft featured a male protagonist and Scotland as its setting. It was filmed in Iceland.

The episode garnered mixed reviews. Critics mostly found its bleakness and violence to be excessive, with further criticism of the plot twists. Some reviewers found the Recaller technology to be interesting, but not meaningfully explored by the episode. Riseborough and Sawar's performances, as well as the visual aesthetics, were acclaimed.

== Plot ==
Driving intoxicated after a party, Rob (Andrew Gower) hits a cyclist on a mountain road, killing him. Rob's companion Mia Nolan (Andrea Riseborough) helps him throw the body off a cliff into a lake.

Fifteen years later, Mia is married, has a nine-year-old son, and works as an architect. After she delivers an important presentation, a newly sober Rob meets her at her hotel. He is going to write an anonymous letter to the victim's wife, after seeing a news article indicating she never moved on, but Mia is afraid the letter will be traced. An argument ensues and Mia breaks Rob's neck, killing him. Out of the window, she notices a self-driving pizza delivery truck hit a pedestrian. Playing pornography in the room as an alibi, she disposes of Rob's body.

The pedestrian is visited by Shazia (Kiran Sonia Sawar), an insurance investigator who uses a "Recaller" to view his memories, as best as he can picture them, on a screen. She finds a woman he passed on the street before the incident, who directs her to a dentist, who saw Mia looking at the accident from her hotel room. In each case Shazia makes them smell beer from the nearby brewery and replays a song that played in a passing car to strengthen their memories. Hoping to get bonus pay from a quick investigation, Shazia makes a lengthy drive to meet Mia.

A tense Mia only allows Shazia in when told that refusal will be reported to the police. Mia tries to divert her memory away from the death of Rob but fails, and Shazia sees memories of both of the killings. Shazia tries to leave but her car does not start and Mia smashes the window, knocks her out and ties her up in a shed. Mia disbelieves Shazia's promise to keep the information secret, and uses the Recaller to learn that Shazia had told her husband Anan (Anthony Welsh) her whereabouts. Mia beats Shazia to death, drives to her house and, masked, kills Anan as he bathes. As Mia exits, having removed her mask, she sees the couple's baby son babbling in front of her and kills him so as not to leave a witness. However, the police later discover that the baby was born blind, therefore unable to witness Mia's crime.

Police use the Recaller on the baby's pet guinea pig, which had observed the final murder. Officers then quietly arrive at the ending of Mia's son's school production of Bugsy Malone, where she is in the audience, crying in silence.

== Production ==
Whilst series one and two of Black Mirror were shown on Channel 4 in the UK, in September 2015 Netflix commissioned the series for 12 episodes, and in March 2016 it outbid Channel 4 for the rights to distribute the series in the UK, with an offer of $40 million. The twelve-episode order was divided into two series of six episodes each, with "Crocodile" in the latter group. The six episodes in series four were released on Netflix simultaneously on 29 December 2017. "Crocodile" is listed as the third episode, but as Black Mirror is an anthology series, each instalment can be watched in any order.

=== Writing and casting ===
The episode was written by the series creator Charlie Brooker, with Annabel Jones as executive producer. It was inspired by the series one episode "The Entire History of You", which featured a personal implant that a person could use privately to review their memories. According to Jones, they considered what the situation would be like if these memories were not private, developing a "cat-and-mouse type drama" that would highlight the importance of memories, and to what lengths someone with a secret would go to conceal them.

In its original form, the script involved a woman who, at the age of two, had seen her mother die, causing her to become an anxious and fearful person. Brooker compared this to a virtual reality trip down a jungle river with random events: one person may have an enjoyable experience despite some negative happenstances, but an unlucky person may be attacked by a crocodile almost immediately and, thinking that they are in a "crocodile attack simulator", be anxious for the rest of the game. While the script significantly changed over the course of production, the title was established as "Crocodile" because of this analogy.

The episode was initially conceived with a male protagonist. Andrea Riseborough read the script to audition for the insurance investigator, who was later renamed Shazia and played by Kiran Sonia Sawar. However, Riseborough liked the journey of the protagonist and asked if the part could be rewritten as a woman. Both Brooker and Jones described the change as interesting, with Jones asking, "How often do you see a mother reduced to this level of desperation?" Though they questioned whether a woman would have the physical strength to dispose of a body, Riseborough argued that her character could find that strength in desperation. Brooker commented that "the panicking male murderer is practically a trope", so the gender change was "refreshing".

The episode ends with Mia killing Shazia's son, who turns out to be blind, and her murder is witnessed by a guinea pig. This was intended as dark humour in the tone of 1996 black comedy thriller Fargo, though the episode had been more serious up until that point. Mia then watches her son in a stage adaptation of the 1976 musical film Bugsy Malone, which starred Jodie Foster—the director of the preceding episode "Arkangel".

=== Filming ===
Though set in Scotland, the episode was filmed at locations in Iceland including Harpa.

The episode was directed by John Hillcoat, who described the episode as a "pitch-black comedy of errors". Hillcoat said that "Crocodile" is about "how human beings actually work and how we would respond to something the tech revolution may well bring into our lives". The memory reader technology was conceived by Brooker with the arcade machine for Space Invaders in mind. Production designer Joel Collins compares it to a slide viewer, contrasting with the thin screens of contemporary devices. After the memory reader was designed, other technology in the episode such as the pizza truck were re-designed with similar box styles.

The episode was shot in Iceland and includes scenes filmed in the Harpa concert hall. Brooker had originally called for filming in Scotland in his script, but he later said that Netflix suggested Iceland as a "stunning backdrop". Hillcoat commented that the "cruel inescapable logic" of Mia's actions were suited for Icelandic "strange, vast and primeval landscapes". During filming, Iceland had its largest snowfall in forty years. The scenes involving the pizza van were the worst affected, with shooting taking place over two nights. Snow needed to be continually brushed and special effects teams used heaters and hoses on important areas in frame. A line of dialogue about snow was added, the intention being that the difference in snow was a consequence of observers' differing memories.

Riseborough's performance as Mia was less panicked than Brooker had pictured when writing the episode. Hillcoat opined that Mia has ambition as a "deep inner flaw", whereas Jones thought her actions was a "logical inevitability" of her initially protecting her friend Rob. Brooker said that Mia "really turns" when she hides Rob's body, rather than confessing to causing his death. In her first rehearsal, Riseborough injured her ribs. Sawar found the scene in which her character Shazia was killed by Mia difficult to film, and was unable to watch the scene in the finished episode.

== Marketing ==
External videos
- Black Mirror – Crocodile; Trailer for "Crocodile"
- Black Mirror – Featurette: Crocodile; Commentary by Charlie Brooker and Annabel Jones

In May 2017, a Reddit post unofficially announced the names and directors of the six episodes in series 4 of Black Mirror. The first trailer for the series was released by Netflix on 25 August 2017, and contained the six episode titles. Beginning on 24 November 2017, Netflix published a series of daily posters and trailers for the fourth series, referred to as the "13 Days of Black Mirror". The trailer for "Crocodile" was the second to be released, on 27 November 2017. On 6 December, Netflix published a trailer featuring an amalgamation of scenes from the fourth series, which announced that the series would be released on 29 December.

== Analysis ==
The writers were inspired by the aesthetic of Nordic noir, a genre of crime fiction in the Nordic countries. David Sims of The Atlantic additionally identified elements of psychological thriller, and Charles Bramesco of Vulture found "a familiar series of law-and-order beats". Shazia has the "detective role" in the story, according to Nick Harley of Den of Geek. Harley and The Guardian's Lanre Bakare both found it one of the bleakest episodes of Black Mirror, and Paste's Jacob Oller wrote that there was an "unrelenting pessimism at the heart of the story".

Mia's home can be seen to reflect her character: it is larger than it appears, suggesting secrecy, and its numerous windows contrast with the heavy stone and concrete used in construction. Louisa Mellor of Den of Geek found Mia to be "traumatised by her actions but ... stuck on a murderous path from which she can't turn back". The Telegraph's Chris Harvey saw a message that "there in all of us, a long way down" is the propensity to murder. Prior to her killing spree, Bramesco found that Mia was "trying her best to be a dutiful mother and wife while pursuing excellence as an architecture expert". Writing for The Verge, Laura Hudson viewed that Mia "benefits from the presumption of innocence" as a white woman, and that she is "effective" as "an unlikely killer". Hudson noted that most of Mia's victims are people of colour and drew comparisons to Get Out (2017), a horror film which she said "positioned white femininity as the canny, quiet heart of its violence".

Oller saw Mia's predicament as like the video game Until Dawn (2015), describing that in the game "your every decision begins a series of butterfly effects". Jason Koebler of Vice noted that Mia does not read the End-User License Agreement (EULA) for the Recaller, and suggests that Shazia is lying about the "legal requirement" to use the Recaller, as she previously implied Mia could opt out. Thus, Mia reading the EULA could have allowed her to decline, and the later murders would not have happened.

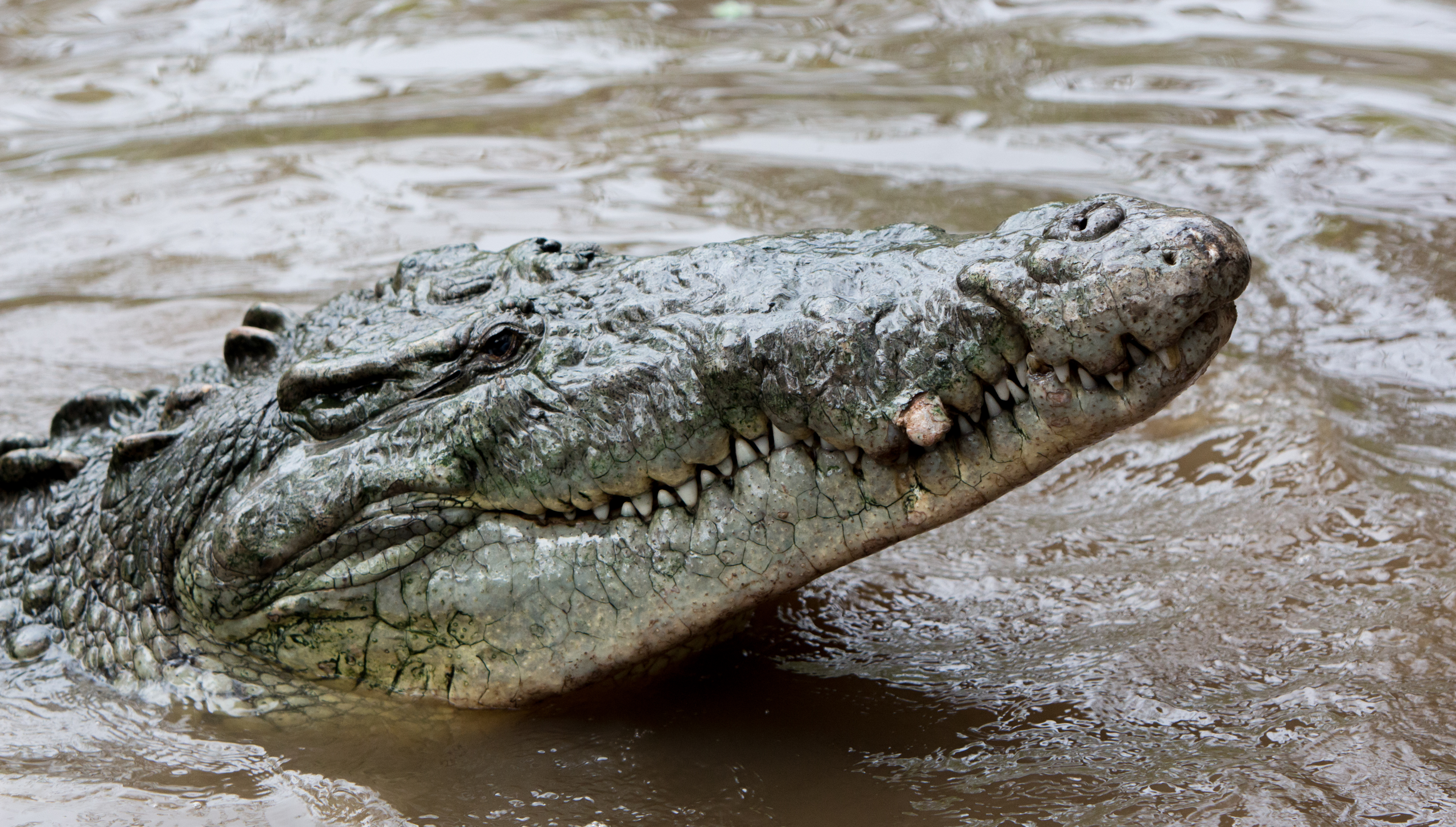
The title "Crocodile" originated from an idea in the initial script, but reviewers drew connections to Mia possibly expressing "crocodile tears".

Some critics drew connections between the title and the idiom "crocodile tears", which refers to insincere expressions of sorrow. Rosie Fletcher of Digital Spy commented that Mia is seen crying in the episode, and initially seems much more emotional than Rob about the car crash death, but Fletcher says that she becomes "a completely ruthless and cold killer". Zack Handlen, a reviewer for The A.V. Club, saw an ambiguity over whether Mia's grief was insincere, suggesting that it could be "all for show" or because "no matter how awful she feels, she keeps pushing forward". Hudson compared her "pseudo-sympathetic tears" to a line from Shakespeare's Hamlet that a person can "smile and smile and smile and be a villain".

Kevin P. Sullivan of Entertainment Weekly saw the technology in the episode as "the means to another end and a different message entirely", though Hudson wrote that it was "hard to identify a takeaway". Some questions were raised by the Recaller. Hudson said it was "an obvious proxy for the increasingly invasive ways our lives are surveilled, from cameras to face-recognition to data theft". Handlen viewed that the episode asks: "Is it ethical to force people to reveal their memories? Is it just another form of police questioning, or something more sinister?" Alissa Wilkinson of Vox found it "frightening" that "memories are not just unreliable, but suggestible". In the episode, one person's memory is seen to change when Shazia tells the person what colour a woman's jacket was. Wilkinson thought that this could be misused by a malicious employee in the justice system.

In January 2018, Toyota announced its self-driving delivery vehicle, the e-Palette. One of their partnerships was with Pizza Hut, to create a self-driving pizza delivery truck. This led to comparisons to the truck with the same function in "Crocodile". The official Twitter account for Black Mirror replied to the announcement with "We know how this goes."

Comparisons were made to other Black Mirror episodes. In terms of the genre, Bramesco found that the instalment "pivots into a two-pronged procedural" like that of "Hated in the Nation". In relation to the technology, the "grain" in "The Entire History of You" records one's vision and hearing exactly, whereas in "Crocodile" the Recaller is dependent on imperfect recollections. In "Crocodile", the song "Anyone Who Knows What Love Is (Will Understand)" plays—it became a recurring feature of Black Mirror after Abi sang it in "Fifteen Million Merits". The talent show Hot Shots and pornography channel WraithBabes, two other features of "Fifteen Million Merits", are also mentioned in "Crocodile". Other "Easter egg" references to Black Mirror instalments include the appearance of UKN, a news channel from "The National Anthem", and the pizza company Fence's, which also features in "USS Callister". A newspaper article briefly shown also contains the text: "Of course the real question is why anyone would pause what they're watching just to read a sentence in a printed out newspaper article, says a voice in your head — before advising you to go and share this finding on Reddit".

== Reception ==
The episode received mixed critical reception, with consensus that the technological themes could have been explored further and that the ending was gratuitously dark, but that the characters were well-acted and the setting was aesthetically pleasing. On the review aggregator Rotten Tomatoes, the episode received positive reviews from 53% of 19 critics, with an average rating of 6.39/10. The site's summary says that the episode is "beautiful but blunt" and that its "nightmarish concept can't quite overcome its own shallow nihilism." Out of five stars, the episode received a rating of three stars in Vulture and The Telegraph and 2.5 stars in Den of Geek. Additionally, Paste rated it 7.1 out of 10 and The A.V. Club gave it a B−.

Handlen said that the episode was the "thinnest from a conceptual standpoint" of the series four episodes, that there was "not a lot to this story" and that its plot becomes "clear" when the Recaller's functionality is established. Wilkinson wrote that it "doesn't feel all that innovative" and Sims felt "emotionally and intellectually unfulfilled". Harvey said it was "a little too predictable". In contrast, Mellor had a more positive response, calling it "stunning to look at, very sick and very funny". Critics mostly found the bleakness to be unjustified: Vulture's Jen Chaney wrote that it was "filled with so much brutal, senseless violence", comparing it unfavourably to the episode "Black Museum". Harley saw it as "grossly over the top" and "the most mean-spirited" Black Mirror episode to date. Sims wrote that it "didn't seem to have much of a deeper point".

Reviewing for Wired, James Temperton said that the episode "raises genuinely interesting questions about technological advancement", though there is a question of how the Recaller would become "universally accepted". Hudson saw the design of the Recall as having "a lot of potential" that "is largely wasted" and Harley concurred that the episode "never really takes advantage" of the idea of "distortions of recalled events". Similarly, Handlen said it was "frustrating how much time the episode spends developing its technology without that development actually leading to anything relevant". Sims wrote that "there seemed to be no broader message to justify the horror". However, Harvey saw the Recaller as "a fascinating example of how science-fiction does not need vast budgets to play with interesting ideas".

The ending was mostly criticised. Handlen summarised: "while both reveals are unexpected, neither of them illuminate anything that came before it". Hudson saw the "dramatic irony" in the baby's blindness, but critiqued that "it arrives abruptly and without setup". Bramesco saw the twist that the baby was blind as "needlessly cruel" and Bakare analysed that it was "a step too far for many". Hudson said that the guinea pig being used to catch Mia "makes no sense, even within the episode's techno-mythos", though Mellor found this twist funny. Oller said that the ending overall was "written well enough that the dread precedes the groans", but contained "enough overkill" and was "more than a bit silly".

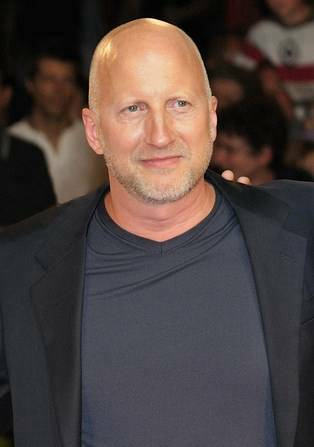
John Hillcoat's directing received praise.

The acting received acclaim, although Mia's character was criticised. Sullivan lauded that "Riseborough's performance is as close to undeniable as they come". Sims said she was a "wonderful actress" and "almost sold [him] on Mia's abrupt descent into darkness early on in this episode". Harley said that she was "steely and reserved" but shows emotion "at all of the right times", so that Mia does not become "a complete heartless sadist". In contrast, The Independent's Jacob Stolworthy saw her as "perhaps the most unlikeable creation to have featured in Black Mirror" to that point, and it was "unclear" whether that was intentional. Chaney said that Mia's actions "seem completely out of character" given her initial behaviour after the car crash. Sawar was praised, with Harley saying that she employed a "bright, plucky determinism" as Shazia. Oller said that her "professionalism and personal touch" was "endearing" and desirable in a detective character. Additionally, Sims found it pleasant to see Shazia assembling information "methodically but with empathy and care".

Architectural Digest reviewed the aesthetics as the best of the fourth series. Hudson found them "austere and beautiful" and Temperton commented that the episode "looks magnificent". Handlen said: "The Icelandic setting is gorgeous, managing to convey the characters' isolation and vulnerability with visuals alone". Hillcoat was praised for his directing work by Stolworthy, who found the episode "often stylistically pleasing". Oller enjoyed the "unflinching, up-close grotesquery" in his direction. Chaney saw Hillcoat as "summoning a frostbitten grimness from forbidding territory", made possible by the "vivid, evocative setting".

=== Episode rankings ===
"Crocodile" received middling rankings on critics' lists of the 23 instalments of Black Mirror by quality, from best to worst:

- 8th – Travis Clark, Business Insider
- 10th – Corey Atad, Esquire
- 11th – Matt Donnelly and Tim Molloy, TheWrap
- 12th – Charles Bramesco, Vulture
- 16th – Aubrey Page, Collider
- 17th – Morgan Jeffery, Digital Spy
- 18th – James Hibberd, Entertainment Weekly
- 19th – Ed Power, The Telegraph

IndieWire authors ranked the 22 Black Mirror instalments excluding Bandersnatch by quality, putting "Crocodile" in last place. Eric Anthony Glover of Entertainment Tonight found the episode to be second-worst of the 19 episodes from series one to four. Instead of by quality, Proma Khosla of Mashable ranked the episodes by tone, concluding that "Crocodile" is the 12th-most pessimistic episode of the show.

Other reviewers ranked "Crocodile" against other series four episodes:

- 4th (grade: C+) – TVLine
- 5th – Christopher Hooton, Jacob Stolworthy, The Independent
