= L'Astrée =

Novel by Honoré d'Urfé

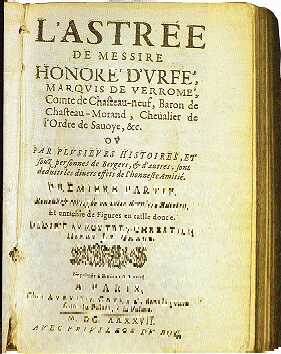

L'Astrée is a pastoral novel by Honoré d'Urfé, published between 1607 and 1627.

Possibly the single most influential work of 17th-century French literature, L'Astrée has been called the "novel of novels", partly for its immense length (six parts, forty stories, sixty books in 5,399 pages) but also for the success it had throughout Europe: it was translated into a great number of languages and read at every royal court. Even today, this novel is regularly republished, both in full and in abridged editions, and even in comic book form. The first three parts were published in 1607, 1610 and 1619; After Honoré d'Urfé's death in 1625 the fourth was completed by Balthazar Baro, and a fifth and sixth were supplied in 1626 by Pierre Boitel, sieur de Gaubertin. The last two are often counted as one.

The plot is immensely complex, but the main thread of the storyline is the perfect love between a shepherd and shepherdess of fifth-century Forez, the heroine Astrée (named after Astræa) and her lover Céladon. Céladon, who was frequently described as wearing grayish-green ribbons and a matching coat, gave his name to the colour celadon, the ceramic celadon, and mineral celadonite. The perfidies and political ambitions of the other characters, which result in many misadventures for the couple, occupy the greater proportion of the novel, which is frequently interrupted by digressions into stories that are strictly unrelated but which serve to flesh out the world in which they live. D'Urfé's descriptions of Forez are sufficiently detailed for many locations to be identified without ambiguity. Visitors to Boën can today follow the chemins de l'Astrée ("paths of Astrée") by visiting the Grand Pré in the grounds of d'Urfé's old estate.

The most important editions are those of 1733, 1925 and 2006. A film version, Les Amours d'Astrée et de Céladon, by Éric Rohmer, was made in 2007. An opera by Gérard Pesson was performed in 2006 at the Stuttgart Opera, and in 2009 in Paris.

In his work The social destiny of man: or, Theory of the four movements, Charles Fourier discussed celadony (l'amour Céladonique), describing it as purely spiritual love embodied by Céladon in L'Astrée.

== Bibliography ==
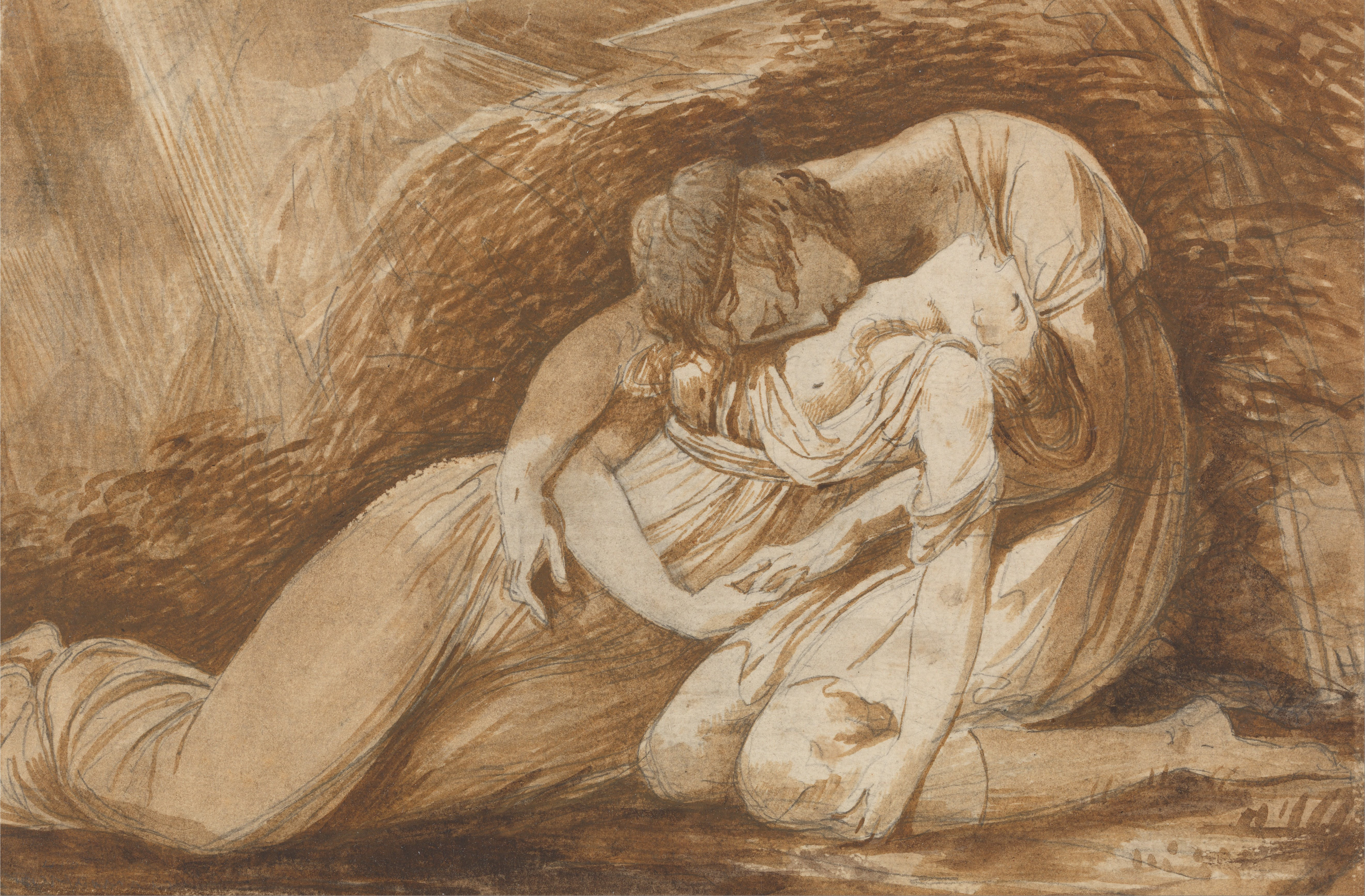
- Alexander Runciman - Celadon and Amelia from Thomson's 'The Seasons' - Google Art Project
  Honore d'Urfé. Louise K. Horowitz. Boston: Twayne Publishers, 1984.
- "L'astrée or Céladon the Dinosaur". Henry T. Harvey. The French Review, Vol. 23, No. 3 (Jan., 1950), pp. 241–244.
- Complete critical Edition, 2005–2019 : by Eglal Henein, Professor Emeritus of Tufts University. Deux visages de l'Astrée (Two Faces of L'Astrée), Digital online critical edition of the three parts of L'Astrée published by the author during his lifetime (1607, 1610, 1619, the last complete edition revised by the author in 1621), and the posthumous 4th volume of 1627. The site also offers a modern French version of these three parts. Posthumous Part 5 and 6 are being edited.
- Astrea, Steven Rendall's English translation of Part I, with an introductory critical essay, is available in the Medieval and Renaissance Texts and Studies series (1995).
