= Kiran Sonia Sawar =

British actress

- Born: Pollokshields, Glasgow, Scotland
- Occupation: Actress
- Years active: 2015–present

Kiran Sonia Sawar is a Scottish actress. She has appeared in the one-off television drama Murdered by My Father and in "Crocodile", an episode of the fourth season of anthology series Black Mirror.

== Early life ==
Sawar is of Pakistani descent and grew up in Pollokshields, Glasgow. She attended the University of St Andrews where she received a degree in Marine and Environmental Biology. After graduating, she trained in acting at the Oxford School of Drama, where she left in 2012.

== Career ==
Sawar made her acting debut in theatre before landing her first television role in 2015. After a series of minor roles in various television series, she garnered critical acclaim for her role as the protagonist in the BBC television drama Murdered by My Father, which highlighted the issue of honour killings. She portrayed Cordelia in the 2016 stage adaptation of Evelyn Waugh's novel Brideshead Revisited. Kiran was offered a role in the movie Meg 2: The Trench where she plays the character of Sal.

== Filmography ==
=== Film ===
Year	Title	Role	Notes
2016	Murdered by My Father	Salma	TV movie
2017	The Boy With The Topknot	Young Sathnam's Mother	TV movie
2017	Diana and I	Yasmin	TV movie
2019	Brexit: The Uncivil War	Shamara	TV movie
2020	Mogul Mowgli	Asma	Indie movie
2020	Kindred	Linsey	Indie movie
2020	Listen	Anjali	Indie movie
2021	Danny Boy	Deena Aayari	TV movie
2023	Meg 2: The Trench	Sal	Hollywood Movie
2026	Jack Ryan: Ghost War	Claudia	TV movie

=== Television ===
Year	Title	Role	Notes
2015	Legends	Farrah Bulfati	4 episodes
2015	Holby City	Hafsa Ali	1 episode
2017	Father Brown	Alisha Prasad	1 episode
2017	The Educatoror	Meena	3 episodes
2017	The Good Karma Hospital	Sister Inez	1 episode
2017	Doctors	Pramada Malik	1 episode
2017	Casualty	Riya Mehat	1 episode
2017	Black Mirror	Shazia	Episode: "Crocodile"
2018	Next of Kin	Ani Shirani	Main cast
2018	Deep State	Sita	Main cast
2019	Silent Witness	Alice	4 episodes
2019	Pure	Shereen	6 episodes
2019	Humpty Dumpty	Peggy	Short
2019	Azaar	Hiydat	Short
2019	The Capture	Naz	3 episodes
2019	I Am... (TV series)	Rebecca	TV movie
2020	McDonald & Dodds	Maheeda Abaasie	Series 1, episode 2
2021-2023	The Nevers	Harriet Kaur	Recurring cast
2024	Truelove	Ayesha	6 episodes
2024	Slow Horses	Giti Rahman	4 episodes
2025	End of Play	Shiva	Short
2026	Leave me alone	Izzy	Short
2027	Maya	Karen	4 episodes
