= Murdered by My Father =

- Genre: Drama
- Created by: Vinay Patel
- Written by: Vinay Patel
- Directed by: Bruce Goodison
- Starring: Adeel Akhtar; Kiran Sonia Sawar; Mawaan Rizwan; Salman Akhtar; Reiss Jeram
- Composer: Samuel Sim
- Country of origin: United Kingdom
- Original language: English

Production
- Executive producers: Aysha Rafaele, Damian Kavanagh, Elliot Reed
- Producer: Toby Welch
- Cinematography: Felix Wiedemann
- Editor: Josh Cunliffe
- Running time: 75 minutes
- Production company: BBC

Original release
- Network: BBC Three
- Release: 29 March 2016

Murdered by My Father is a British drama television film written by Vinay Patel, directed by Bruce Goodison and produced by Toby Welch, and starring Adeel Akhtar and Kiran Sonia Sawar, that first aired on BBC One in March 2016. The drama tells the story of an honour killing of a British Asian Muslim teenage girl by her father.

For his performance in the film, Akhtar won the British Academy Television Award for Best Actor. The film itself won Best Single Drama at the Royal Television Society Awards in 2017.

== Summary ==
Widowed father Shahzad is bringing up two children, daughter Salma and son Hassan, alone. Teenager Salma has been promised to Haroon in an arranged marriage but she falls in love with Imi. Following a confrontation with Haroon and with men from their community, Shahzad murders his daughter and kills himself.

== Cast ==
- Adeel Akhtar as Shahzad
- Kiran Sonia Sawar as Salma
- Mawaan Rizwan as Imi
- Salman Akhtar as Haroon
- Reiss Jeram as Hassan

== Critical reception ==
Ceri Redford, writing in The Daily Telegraph, described the drama as "nuanced and unbearably heart-breaking" and "a brave piece of television". Kasia Delgado, in the Radio Times, wrote that the drama "deserves a Bafta [award] for depicting this very real issue so brilliantly".
