= Sanditon =

1817 unfinished novel by Jane Austen

- Author: Jane Austen
- Language: English
- Genre: Romantic novel
- Publication date: 1925
- Publication place: United Kingdom
- Media type: Print (hardback & paperback)
- Text: Sanditon at Wikisource

Sanditon is an 1817 unfinished novel by the English writer Jane Austen. In January 1817, Austen began work on a new novel she called The Brothers, later titled Sanditon, and completed twelve chapters before stopping work in mid-March 1817, probably because of illness. R.W. Chapman first published a transcription of the original manuscript in 1925 under the name Fragment of a Novel Written by Jane Austen, January–March 1817.

== Synopsis ==
The novel centres on Charlotte Heywood, the eldest of the daughters still at home in the large family of a country gentleman from Willingden, Sussex. The narrative opens when the carriage of Mr and Mrs Parker of Sanditon topples over on a hill near the Heywood home. Because Mr Parker is injured in the crash, and the carriage needs repairs, the Parkers stay with the Heywood family for a fortnight. During this time, Mr Parker talks fondly of Sanditon, a town which until a few years before had been a small, unpretentious fishing village. With his business partner, Lady Denham, Mr Parker hopes to make Sanditon into a fashionable seaside resort. Mr Parker's enormous enthusiasm for his plans to improve and modernise Sanditon has resulted in the installation of bathing machines and the construction of a new home for himself and his family near the seashore. Upon repair of the carriage and improvement to Mr Parker's foot, the Parkers return to Sanditon, bringing Charlotte with them as their summer guest.

Upon arrival in Sanditon, Charlotte meets the inhabitants of the town. Prominent among them is Lady Denham, a twice-widowed woman who received a fortune from her first husband and a title from her second. Living with Lady Denham is her niece Clara Brereton, a sweet and beautiful yet impoverished young lady. Also living in Sanditon are Sir Edward Denham and his sister Esther, nephew and niece to Lady Denham by her second husband. The siblings are poor and are thought to be seeking Lady Denham's fortune; Sir Edward is described as a silly and very florid man, though handsome.

After settling in with the Parkers and encountering various neighbours, Charlotte and Mr and Mrs Parker are surprised by a visit from his two sisters and younger brother, all of whom are self-declared invalids. However, given their level of activity and seeming strength, Charlotte quickly surmises that their complaints are invented. Diana Parker has come on a mission to secure a house for a wealthy family from the West Indies, although she has not specifically been asked to help. She also brings word of a second large party, a girls' school, which is intending to summer at Sanditon. This news causes a stir in the small town, especially for Mr Parker, whose fondest wish is the promotion of tourism there.

With the arrival of Mrs Griffiths at Sanditon, it soon becomes apparent that the family from the West Indies and the girls' school group are one and the same. The visitors consist of Miss Lambe, a teenaged Antiguan-English heiress, and the two Miss Beauforts, English girls just arrived from the West Indies. In short order, Lady Denham calls on Mrs. Griffiths to be introduced to Miss Lambe, the sickly and very rich young woman that she intends her nephew, Sir Edward, to marry.

A carriage unexpectedly arrives bearing Sidney Parker, the middle Parker brother. He will be staying in town for a few days with two friends who will join him shortly. Sidney Parker is about 27 or 28 years old, and Charlotte finds him very good-looking, with a decided air of fashion.

The book fragment ends when Mrs Parker and Charlotte visit Sanditon House, Lady Denham's residence. There Charlotte spots Clara Brereton seated with Sir Edward Denham at her side having an intimate conversation in the garden and surmises that they must have a secret understanding. When they arrive inside, Charlotte observes that a large portrait of Sir Henry Denham hangs over the fireplace, whereas Lady Denham's first husband, who owned Sanditon House, only gets a miniature in the corner – obliged, as it were, to sit back in his own house and see the best place by the fire constantly occupied by Sir Henry Denham.

== Characters ==
- Mr. and Mrs. Heywood – A prosperous gentleman farmer and his wife who open their home to Mr. and Mrs. Thomas Parker, whose carriage overturns nearby. It was written that the Heywoods would have been even more prosperous if they had not had 14 children. They do not care to travel, but have no objection to their children doing so if they have the opportunity.
- Charlotte Heywood – The eldest of the Heywood daughters still at home. A nice, pretty girl who appears to be the heroine of the novel. Much of the story is told from her perspective. She is invited to experience the seaside at Sanditon with Mr. and Mrs. Parker.
- Mr. Thomas Parker – The eldest of the three Parker brothers. Middle-aged; fanatical over the health benefits of sea air and water. He and Lady Denham are invested in promoting Sanditon as a smaller Brighton.
- Mrs. Thomas Parker (Mary) – Thomas' wife and mother of their four children, Little Mary and three boys.
- Sidney Parker – The second Parker brother, who is 27–28 years old. Good-looking, well bred, "air of ease and fashion and a lively countenance". Most sources contend he was to be the hero and marry Charlotte; however, he is barely mentioned before Austen stopped writing and it is not known what other characters she might have had in mind. He and his three other siblings, Arthur, Susan, and Diana come to Sanditon for a visit.
- Miss Susan Parker – The older of the two spinster Parker sisters. A hypochondriac.
- Miss Diana Parker – 34 years old. A hypochondriac when not busy being a nosy, self-satisfied, officious pest.
- Arthur Parker – The youngest Parker brother. 21 years old. An overweight hypochondriac. "Poor health" is his excuse to eat what he wants and sit lazily by the fire. Lives with his spinster sisters.
- Lady Denham, née Brereton – 70 years old; twice widowed. She lives in Sanditon Hall, the largest house in the area and home of her first husband. She was born wealthy but was not well educated. She inherited more money from her first husband, Mr. Hollis. Her title came from her poor, second husband Sir Harry Denham. Many family members, her own and her late husbands', wish to inherit from her.
- Sir Edward Denham – He inherits Sir Harry's title but not the money. He is insincere, with loose morals. He would like to seduce Clara Brereton because she is "young, lovely, and dependent" and a rival for Lady Denham's fortune.
- Miss Esther Denham – The sister of Sir Edward.
- Miss Clara Brereton – The poor distant cousin of Lady Denham who has been living with her for about a year. She is a "lovely and interesting young woman... Elegantly tall, regularly handsome, with great delicacy of complexion and soft blue eyes, (with) a sweetly modest and yet naturally graceful address."
- Mrs. Whitby – She runs the library/general store in Sanditon.
- Miss Whitby – Helps with her mother's business.
- Young Whitby – Helps with his mother's business.
- Mr. and Mrs. Hillier – Mentioned as people now living in the Parker's previous family home since Mr. Thomas Parker built a modern new home named "Trafalgar".
- Mrs. Griffiths – Seems to be a professional chaperone who is paid to look after girls and introduce them around.
- Miss Beaufort – One of Mrs. Griffiths' charges, who plays the harp. Interested in fashion, and looking for a rich husband.
- Miss Letitia Beaufort – Younger sister to Miss Beaufort. She sketches. Also interested in fashion and looking for a rich husband.
- Miss Lambe – One of Mrs. Griffiths' charges. A 17-year-old "half-mulatto" heiress from the West Indies in poor health. Lady Denham is interested in her as a potential bride for her impecunious nephew Sir Edward.

== Analysis and background ==
The people of "modern Sanditon", as Austen calls it, have moved out of the "old house – the house of [their] forefathers" and are busily constructing a new world in the form of a modern seaside commercial town. The town of Sanditon is almost certainly based on Worthing, where Jane Austen stayed in late 1805 when the resort was first being developed. There is persuasive evidence that the character of Mr. Thomas Parker was inspired by Edward Ogle, Worthing's early entrepreneur, whom Jane Austen and her sister Cassandra knew. Sanditon is, however, less of an actual reality than an ideal of the inhabitants – one that they express in their descriptions of it. These inhabitants have a conception of the town's identity and of the way in which this identity should be spread to, and appreciated by, the world:

My name perhaps... may be unknown at this distance from the coast – but Sanditon itself – everybody has heard of Sanditon, – the favourite – for a young and rising bathing-place, certainly the favourite spot of all that are to be found along the coast of Sussex; – the most favoured by nature, and promising to be the most chosen by man.

— Sanditon

== Continuations and adaptations ==
Because Austen completed setting the scene for Sanditon, it has been a favourite of "continuators" – later writers who try to complete the novel within Austen's vision while emulating her style. Such "completed" versions of Sanditon include:

- Sanditon, by Jane Austen and "another lady", ISBN 0-684-84342-0; also published as Sanditon, by Jane Austen and Marie Dobbs, ISBN 3-423-12666-3 and Sanditon, by Jane Austen and Anne Telscombe, ISBN 0-395-20284-1
- A Completion of Sanditon, by Juliette Shapiro, ISBN 1-58939-503-4 (does not include Austen's text)
- A Return to Sanditon: a completion of Jane Austen's fragment, by Anne Toledo, ISBN 978-1-4580-7426-3 (includes Austen's text)
- Sanditon, by Jane Austen and completed by D. J. Eden, ISBN 0-7541-1610-7
- Jane Austen's Sanditon: A continuation, by Anna Austen Lefroy (Austen's niece), ISBN 0-942506-04-9 (also unfinished)
- Jane Austen Out of the Blue, by Donald Measham, ISBN 978-1-84728-648-2
- Jane Austen's Charlotte, by Jane Austen and completed by Julia Barrett, ISBN 0-87131-908-X
- A Cure for All Diseases (Canada and US title: The Price of Butcher's Meat) by Reginald Hill, ISBN 978-0-06-145193-5, a novel in the Dalziel and Pascoe series, is acknowledged by the author to be a "completion" of Sanditon. In Hill's novel, the village is renamed Sandytown, and lies on the Yorkshire coast.
- Welcome to Sanditon, a modernized mini webseries adaptation set in California, produced by the creators of The Lizzie Bennet Diaries and premiered on 13 May 2013. Not continuing the story, the adaptation uses a deus ex machina to end where Austen left off, replacing Charlotte with [Fitz]William Darcy's sister, Georgiana (Gigi) from Pride and Prejudice. Near the end, William makes an appearance, pulling Gigi out from her role as Charlotte.
- Sanditon The Play, Chris Brindle's completion of Jane Austen's and Anna Lefroy's work as a play, also edited into a 2 hour film recording of the Headgate Theatre, Colchester, performance.
- Sanditon, a television series adapted by Andrew Davies and premiered on ITV on 25 August 2019, and PBS on 12 January 2020. A second series, commissioned by PBS and BritBox, aired on PBS on 20 March 2022, and premiered on ITV on 22 July 2022 after previously streaming on Britbox; a third series was shot back-to-back for later transmission, and appeared on ITVX during 2023.

== Sources ==
- Austen, Jane (1996). Ed. Peter Washington. Sanditon and Other Stories. New York: Alfred A. Knopf; Everyman's Library.
- Edmonds, Antony (2013). Jane Austen's Worthing: The Real Sanditon. Stroud, UK: Amberley Publishing.
- Spacks, Patricia Meyer (1985). Gossip. New York: Alfred A. Knopf.
- Tomalin, Claire (1997). Jane Austen: A Life. New York: Vintage.
