= Luke Norris (actor) =

British actor

- Born: 1 September 1985 (age 41); Romford, England
- Occupation: Actor
- Years active: 2008–present
- Spouse: Joanna Horton
- Children: 2

Luke Norris (born 1 September 1985) is an English actor best known for playing Dr Dwight Enys in Poldark.

== Filmography ==
=== Film ===
Year	Title	Role	Notes
2007	Running for River	Jamie	Short film
2008	The Duchess	Footman	
2009	Mine	Mitch	Short film
2016	FirstBorn	James	
2018	Been So Long	Barney	
2021	The Colour Room	Guy Shorter	
2022	The Weekend Away	Rob	

=== Television ===
Year	Title	Role	Notes
2008	The Inbetweeners	Jay's Friend	Season 1, Episode 4
2009	Skins	Donny	Season 3, Episode 10
2012	Titanic	Seamen Holmes	Season 1, Episode 4
2014	Our World War	Lt. Mold	Season 1, Episode 3
2015–2019	Poldark	Doctor Dwight Enys	Main cast
2016	Sunday Brunch	Himself	Season 5, Episode 32
2018	Zoe Ball on...	Himself	Season 1, Episode 21

== Theatre ==
Year	Title	Role	Notes
2010	The Gods Weep	Jimmy	Royal Shakespeare Company
2011	The Kitchen	Michael	National Theatre Live
2012	Antigone	Soldier	National Theatre Live
2012	Orpheus Descending	Val Xavier	Royal Exchange Theatre
2013	As You Like It	Oliver	Royal Shakespeare Company
2015	A View from the Bridge	Rodolfo	National Theatre Live
2016	Blue/Orange	Bruce	Young Vic
2020	Nora: A Doll’s House	Thomas	Young Vic
2021	The Normal Heart	Bruce Niles	National Theatre
