= James Austen =

English clergyman, poet, and brother of Jane Austen

The Reverend James Austen
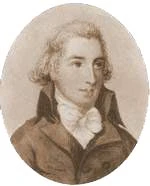
- Born: 1765
- Died: 1819 (aged 53–54)
- Occupation: Clergyman
- Known for: Jane Austen's eldest brother
- Children: at least 3
- Father: George Austen
- Relatives: Edward Austen Knight (brother); Henry Thomas Austen (brother); Cassandra Austen (sister); Francis Austen (brother); Jane Austen (sister); Charles Austen (brother); Philadelphia Austen Hancock (aunt)

James Austen (1765 – 1819) was an English clergyman. He is best known for being the eldest brother of celebrated novelist Jane Austen.

== Biography ==
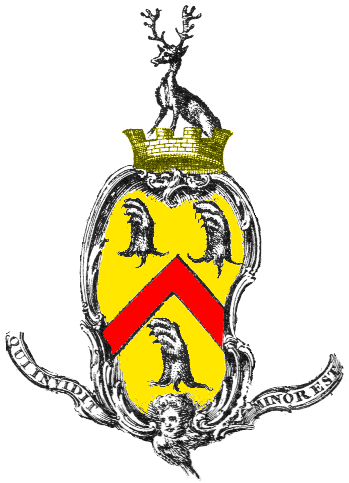
Coat of Arms of the Austen family, with the Latin motto, "QUI INVIDIT MINOR EST" (18th century)

His father George Austen's living had been in Steventon, Hampshire, and James succeeded him in this position, in 1801.

Austen's mother, formerly Cassandra Leigh, was a member of a prominent Oxford Leigh family, and was a descendant of one of the founders of St. John's College. Cassandra's family connection entitled her sons to be legacy students, who did not have to compete for admission, and who were entitled to attend tuition free. Austen and his younger brother Henry both attended Oxford University and shared accommodation.

Like his more famous sister, Austen was a writer. According to Felicity Day, writing in The Telegraph, he published a weekly periodical called The Loiterer for a year in the 1790s and wrote much of its content. He published several pieces by his brother Henry, and Day speculated that he may have published one piece by his teenaged sister Jane. Day says the satirical pieces in The Loiterer resembled the unpublished juvenilia Jane wrote for her family.

== Personal life ==
Both James and his brother Henry were romantically interested in their cousin, Eliza de Feuillide, the daughter of their aunt Philadelphia Austen Hancock. Eliza married Henry.

James Austen married at 27, and was widowed when he was 30. His first wife, Anne Mathew, bore him a daughter, Anna. His second wife, Mary Lloyd, bore him at least two more children, James Edward and Caroline.
