= Under the Hill =

Unfinished erotic novel by Aubrey Beardsley

Under the Hill is an unfinished erotic novel by Aubrey Beardsley, based on the legend of Tannhäuser. The first parts of it were published in The Savoy and later issued in book form by Leonard Smithers. In 1907, the original manuscript was published and entitled The Story of Venus and Tannhäuser.

A version completed by John Glassco was published in 1959 by Olympia Press, in a limited run of 3,000 copies. This completed version was also later introduced into the Olympia Press/New English Library "Traveller's Companion Series" in 1966.
