= Honoré d'Urfé =

French novelist (1568–1625)

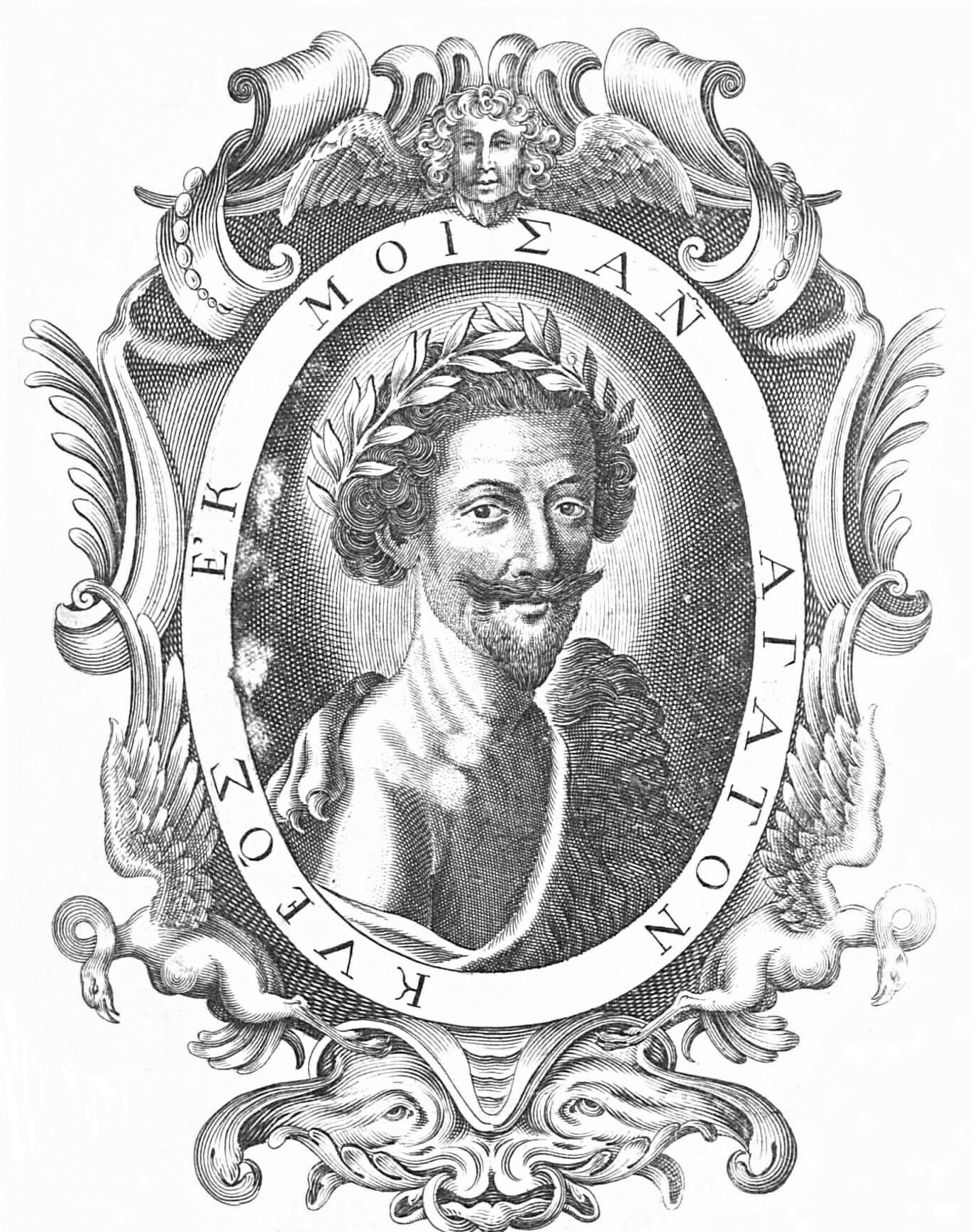
- Born: 11 February 1568; Marseille, France
- Died: 1 June 1625 (aged 57); Villefranche-sur-Mer, France
- Occupation: Writer
- Writing career
- Period: 16th century
- Genre: Pastoral
- Notable work: L'Astrée
- Movement: Précieuses

Honoré d'Urfé (11 February 1568 – 1 June 1625), marquis de Valromey, comte de Châteauneuf, was a French novelist and miscellaneous writer.

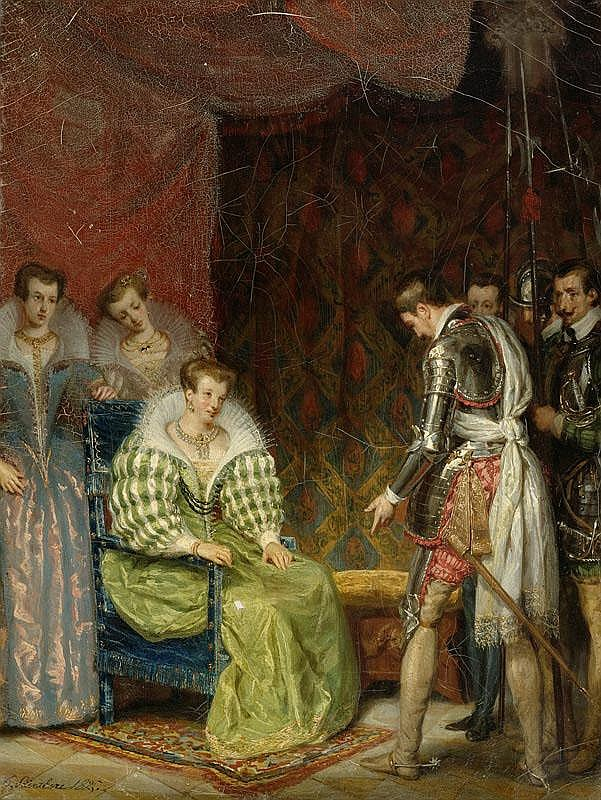
Marguerite de Valois and Honoré d'Urfé (19th-century painting)

== Life ==
He was born at Marseille, the grandson of Claude d'Urfé, and was educated at the Collège de Tournon. A partisan of the League, he was taken prisoner in 1595, and, though soon set free, he was again captured and imprisoned. During his imprisonment he read Ronsard, Petrarch and above all the Diana of Jorge de Montemayor and Tasso's Aminta. After the defeat of the League in 1594, d'Urfé emigrated to Savoy whose duke was a relative of his mother. Here, he wrote the Epîtres morales (1598).

Honoré's brother Anne, comte d'Urfé, had married in 1571 the beautiful Diane de Châteaumorand, but the marriage was annulled in 1598 by Clement VIII. Anne d'Urfé was ordained to the priesthood in 1603, and died in 1621 dean of Montbrison.

Diane had a great fortune, and to avoid the alienation of the money from the D'Urfé family, Honoré married her in 1600. This marriage also proved unhappy; D'Urfé spent most of his time separated from his wife at the court of Savoy, where he held the charge of chamberlain. The separation of goods arranged later on may have been simply due to money embarrassments.

He died from injuries received by a fall from his horse at Villafranca, during a campaign against the Genoese.

== Works ==
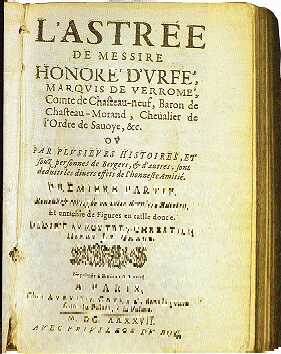
L'Astrée

It was in Savoy that he conceived the plan of his novel L'Astrée, the scene of which is laid on the banks of the Lignon in his native province of Forez. It is a leisurely romance in which the loves of Celadon and Astrée are told at immense length with many digressions. The recently discovered circumstances of the marriages of the brothers have disposed of the idea that the romance is autobiographical in its main idea, but some of the episodes are said to be but slightly veiled accounts of the adventures of Henry IV. The shepherds and shepherdesses of the story are of the usual type in pastorals, and they discourse of love with a casuistry and elaborate delicacy that are by no means rustic.

The first part of L'Astrée appeared in 1607, the second in 1610, the third in 1619, and in 1627 the fourth part was edited. In 1628 a fifth was added by D'Urfé's secretary Balthazar Baro. L'Astrée set the fashion temporarily in romance narratives, and no tragedy was complete without wire-drawn discussions on love in the manner of Celadon and Astrée. The best edition of L'Astrée is that of 1647.

D'Urfé also wrote the pastoral poem Le Sireine (publ 1606) and the pastoral play Sylvanire (1627).

== Memory and legacy ==
In 1757 L'Astrée was sufficiently in the public consciousness, or at any rate "Celadon" had become a byword for amorousness, to be referred to in passing by an Italian guest of Casanova.

In 1908 a bust of D'Urfé was erected at Virieu-le-Grand (Ain), where the greater part of L'Astrée was written.

An adaptation of L'Astrée, by French director Éric Rohmer, was released in 2007 under the title Les Amours d'Astrée et de Céladon (in English-speaking territories its title was The Romance of Astrea and Celadon). It was nominated for a Golden Lion at the 2007 Venice Film Festival, and star Andy Gillet won an Étoile d'Or in 2008 for Best Male Newcomer for his performance as Céladon.
