= Balthazar Baro =

French playwright and romance-writer

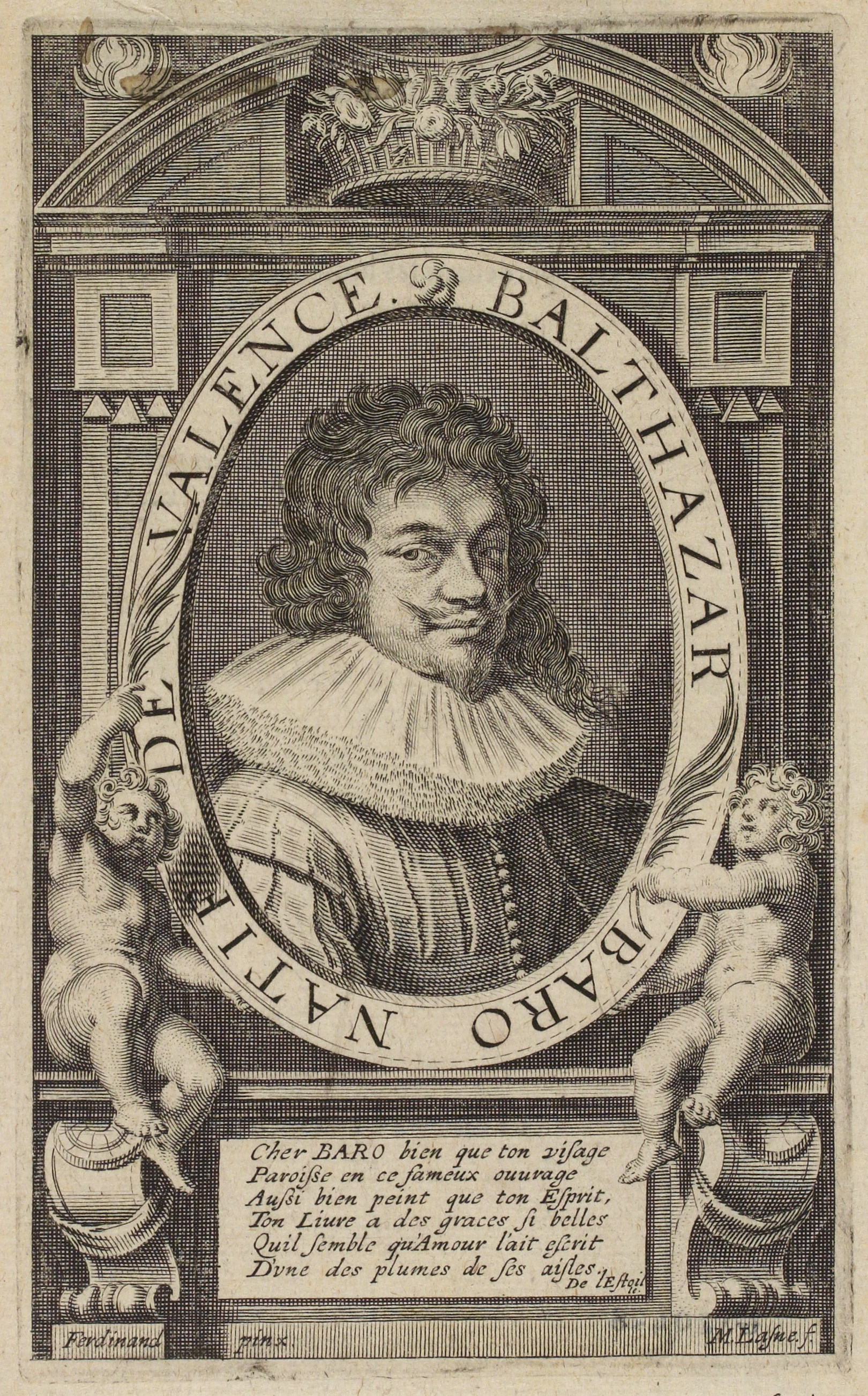
Balthazar Baro

Balthazar Baro (1596 – 1650) was a French poet, playwright and romance-writer.

== Biography ==
Baro was born in Valence, Drôme, to a professor at the university of Valence. He studied at Tournon-sur-Rhône then at Valence, where he gained his law doctorate in 1615, and became secretary to Honoré d'Urfé, whom he had met when they attended the same collège in Tournon, he published Urfé's L'Astrée and wrote a fifth book for it himself (from his master's notes) in 1628. Coming to Paris, he attended on Madame de Chevreuse, sworn enemy of cardinal Richelieu, but even so the immense success of L'Astrée gained him entry to the Académie française in 1636. After being gentleman to Mademoiselle de Montpensier, he held two jobs towards the end of his life, that of procurer to the présidial de Valence and that of treasurer of France at Montpellier. He died in Paris.

== Works ==
Baro's œuvre is made up of four dramatic poems, three tragedies, two odes, a pastoral and a heroic poem. That heroic poem

- L'Astrée de Messire Honoré d'Urfé (1618–28) (5 volumes) - Its end, la Conclusion d'Astrée, was called by Paul Pellisson "[Baro's] greatest and principal work ... in which he seems to have been inspired by his master's genius".
- Célinde, poème héroïque (1629) - a five act prose work in the middle of which the author introduces a passage of around 300 lines of poetry evoking the tragedy of Holofernes, which constituted the first play within a play in French literature
- La Clorise, pastorale (1632)
- Contre l'autheur d'un libelle, ode pour Monseigneur l'éminentissime cardinal duc de Richelieu (1637)
- La Parthénie, dédiée à Mademoiselle (1642)
- La Clarimonde, dédiée à la Reine (1643)
- Le Prince fugitif, poëme dramatique en cinq actes en vers (1649)
- Sainct Eustache martyr, poëme dramatique (1649)
- Cariste, ou les Charmes de la beauté, poëme dramatique (1651)
- Rosemonde, tragédie (1651)
- L'Amante vindicative, poëme dramatique (1652)

In Act I scene I.1 of his Cyrano de Bergerac, Edmond Rostand evoked a production of Baro's La Clorise in order to mock it:

LE JEUNE HOMME (to his father) - What are we going to play ?
LE BOURGEOIS - Clorise.
LE JEUNE HOMME - Who's it by?
LE BOURGEOIS - By monsieur Balthazar Baro. It's a play !

== Bibliography ==
- André Blanc, Valence à travers les hommes, Éditions SOREPI, Valence, 1975.
