= John Glassco =

Canadian poet and writer (1909–1981)

- Born: December 15, 1909; Montreal, Quebec
- Died: January 29, 1981 (age 71)
- Writing career
- Language: English
- Genres: poetry, memoirs
- Notable works: Memoirs of Montparnasse (1970) Selected Poems (1971) English Governess (also published as Harriet Marwood, Governess; 1960)
- Notable awards: Governor General's Award
- Literary movement: Montreal Group

John Glassco (December 15, 1909 – January 29, 1981) was a Canadian poet, memoirist and novelist. According to Stephen Scobie, "Glassco will be remembered for his brilliant autobiography, his elegant, classical poems, and for his translations". He is also remembered by some for his erotica.

== Life ==
Born in Montreal to a monied family, Glassco, known as "Buffy" to his friends, was educated at Selwyn House School, Bishop's College School, Lower Canada College, and McGill University. At McGill he moved on the fringes of the Montreal Group of poets centred on that campus, which included F. R. Scott and A.J.M. Smith. Glassco wrote for the McGill Fortnightly Review with Scott, Smith, and Leon Edel.

At the age of 17, Glassco left McGill without graduating to travel to Paris with his friend, Graeme Taylor. The two settled in the Montparnasse district of Paris, then extremely popular amongst the literary intelligentsia. Their three-year stay formed the basis of Glassco's Memoirs of Montparnasse (1970), a description of expatriate life in Paris during the 1920s.

The book is presented as a genuine memoir, although Glassco had lightly fictionalized some aspects of the work. In it, he describes meeting various celebrities who were living in or passing through Paris at the time, such as James Joyce, Ernest Hemingway, Gertrude Stein, Alice B. Toklas, Ford Madox Ford, Frank Harris, Lord Alfred Douglas and others. In the notes to the edition republished in 2007, further characters are identified as thinly disguised descriptions of Man Ray, Peggy Guggenheim and others.

Glassco was bisexual, and, in the words of Leon Edel, "a bit frightened by certain kinds of women and nearly always delighted if he could establish a triangle."

In 1931 Glassco contracted tuberculosis, which caused him to return home to Canada, where he was hospitalized. In 1935, after having a lung removed, he retired to the town of Foster in Quebec's Eastern Townships. He served as mayor of Foster from 1952 to 1954. Glassco died on January 29, 1981, at the age of 71, in Montreal.

== Writing ==
=== Poetry ===
Glassco went on to earn a strong reputation as a poet. His Selected Poems won Canada's top honour for poetry, the Governor General's Award, in 1971. The Oxford Companion to Canadian Literature says of his poetry:

Glassco's poems — unlike his prose — are largely concerned with ... life in the Eastern Townships ... full of images of derelict farmhouses and decaying roads that peter out in the bush; but reflections on the human condition are never far away from the descriptions of the countryside, so that the life of the land and the lives of people are woven together.... But not all Glassco's poems are bucolic. Some provide a link with his prose by moving into the mythology of literature and history: 'The death of Don Quixote' and 'Brummel at Calais' show Glassco as a master of echoes, and of parody and pastiche in the best sense; they evoke the philosophy of the nineteenth-century dandy and decadent (Brummel, Baudelaire, Wilde) that is also evident in his prose writings."

=== Translations ===
Glassco translated both poetry and fiction from French. He edited the 1970 anthology The Poetry of French Canada in Translation, in which he personally translated texts by 37 different poets. He also translated the work of three French-Canadian novelists: Monique Bosco (Lot's wife / La femme de Loth, 1975) Jean-Yves Soucy (Creature of the chase / Un dieu chasseur, 1979), and Jean-Charles Harvey (Fear's folly / Les demi-civilisés, 1982).

The Canadian Encyclopedia says that Glassco's "translations of French Canadian poetry are, along with F. R. Scott's, the finest yet to appear — his greatest achievement being the Complete Poems of Saint-Denys-Garneau (1975)."

Glassco also edited the 1965 anthology English poetry in Quebec, which originated from a poetry conference held in Foster in 1963.

=== Erotica ===
Glassco's long poem Squire Hardman, on the subject of flagellation, was privately printed in 1967. The poem was inspired by The Rodiad (1871), falsely ascribed to George Colman the Younger, and Glassco continued the hoax by claiming that his own poem was a republication of an 18th-century original by Colman. Glassco's The Temple of Pederasty, on the theme of sado-masochism and male homosexuality, was similarly ascribed to Ihara Saikaku with "translation" by the wholly fictitious "Hideki Okada". Glassco also used the pseudonym "Sylvia Bayer" to publish Fetish Girl, on the theme of rubber fetishism. He wrote The English Governess (Ophelia Press, 1960) and Harriet Marwood, Governess (1967) under yet another pseudonym, "Miles Underwood". Glassco completed the unfinished pornographic novel Under the Hill by Aubrey Beardsley, in an edition published by the Olympia Press in 1959.

== Publications ==
=== Poetry ===
- The Deficit Made Flesh: Poems. Toronto: McClelland & Stewart, 1958.
- A Point of Sky. Toronto: Oxford University Press, 1964. ( Finalist, in 1965, of the Grand prix littéraire de Montréal)
- Selected Poems. Toronto: Oxford University Press, 1971.
- Montreal. Montreal: DC Books, 1973.
- Selected Poems with Three Notes on the Poetic Process. Ottawa: Golden Dog Press, 1997.

=== Memoirs ===
- Memoirs of Montparnasse, Leon Edel intr. Toronto, New York: Oxford UP, 1970. Louis Begley intr. New York: New York Review Books Classics, 2007 ISBN 978-1-59017-184-4

=== Pornography ===
- and Aubrey Beardsley. Under the Hill; or the story of Venus and Tannhauser. Paris: Olympia, 1959.
- The English Governess. as "Miles Underwood." Paris: Ophelia, 1960.
- Harriet Marwood, Governess. New York: Grove P, 1968.
- Fetish Girl. New York: Venus Library, 1971.
- The Fatal Woman: Three Tales. Toronto: Anansi, 1974.

=== Translated ===
- Complete Poems of Saint-Denys Garneau. Ottawa: Oberon, 1975.

=== Edited ===
- English Poetry in Quebec, 1965.
- Poetry of French Canada in Translation. Toronto: Oxford UP, 1970.

== See also ==
- Prix de la traduction John-Glassco, donated by the Literary Translators' Association of Canada
- List of Bishop's College School alumni
