= Gaubertin =

- Commune
- Coat of arms
- Location of Gaubertin
- Location within France Location within Centre-Val de Loire
- Coordinates: 48°07′16″N 2°25′23″E
- Country: France
- Region: Centre-Val de Loire
- Department: Loiret
- Arrondissement: Pithiviers
- Canton: Le Malesherbois
- Intercommunality: Pithiverais-Gâtinais

Government
  - Mayor (2020–2026): Jean Gillet
- Area^{1}: 7.29 km^{2} (2.81 sq mi)
- Highest elevation: 121 m (397 ft)
- Lowest elevation: 91 m (299 ft)
- Population (2023): 251
  - Density: 34.4/km^{2} (89.2/sq mi)
- Demonym: Gaubertinois
- Time zone: UTC+01:00 (CET)
  - Summer (DST): UTC+02:00 (CEST)
- INSEE/Postal code: 45151 /45340
- ^{1} French Land Register data, which excludes lakes, ponds, glaciers > 1 km^{2} (0.386 sq mi or 247 acres) and river estuaries.

Gaubertin (French pronunciation: [ɡobɛʁtɛ̃]) is a commune in the north east corner of the Loiret department in north-central France, close to the border of the Seine et Marne department. It includes three hamlets, Eau De Limon, Sançy et Bel-Aire.

The writer Pierre Boitel lived in the chateau de Gaubertin 1600–1626.

== See also ==
- Communes of the Loiret department
