= Anna Austen Lefroy =

British writer and niece of Jane Austen

- Born: Jane Anna Elizabeth Austen; 1793
- Died: 1872 (aged 78–79)
- Spouse(s): Benjamin Lefroy (1814–1829, his death)
- Children: 7
- Father: James Austen
- Relatives: Jane Austen, aunt

Anna Lefroy (née Jane Anna Elizabeth Austen; 1793–1872) was the niece of Jane Austen by her eldest brother James Austen, and a contributor to her life-history via the so-called Lefroy MS.

As a writer, Anna received many of Austen's letters regarding literary matters.

== Life ==
Known in the family as a naughty child, Anna became a lively, outgoing adolescent. Her aunt described her as "quite an Anna with variations", in reference to the unexpected cropping of Anna's hair.

At the age of twenty, Anna became engaged to a family connection, Benjamin Lefroy, and despite family opposition the pair were married in 1814. The marriage seems to have been a successful one, and by 1817 the pair had two young daughters, and Anna was apparently pregnant again: "Poor Animal, she will be worn out before she is thirty", wrote her aunt. The couple had a total of seven children before Anna was widowed in 1829.

== Writings ==
Niece and aunt had bonded over a love of 'bad' romantic fiction, such as that by Rachel Hunter; and when during her engagement Anna began writing a novel – known as Enthusiasm or Which is the Heroine? – it was natural for her to share it with her aunt.

Anna also tried her hand at continuing an early Austen story called 'Evelyn'; as well as (later) the unfinished Sanditon.

== See also ==
- Cassandra Austen
