= Lethbridge baronets =

Baronetcy of the United Kingdom

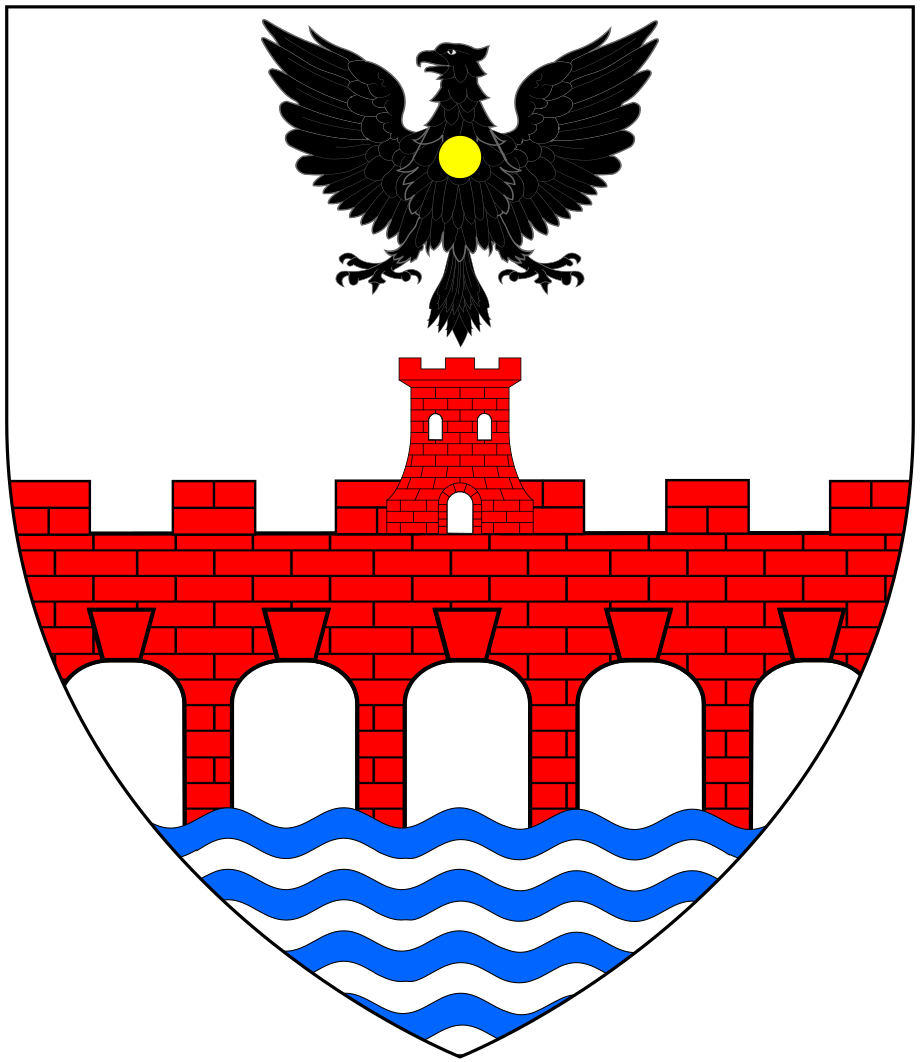
- Escutcheon of the Lethbridge baronets of Westaway House and Winkley Court. Canting arms: Argent, over water proper, a bridge of five arches embattled gules and over the centre arch a turret in chief an eagle displayed sable charged on the breast with a bezant
- Creation date: 1804
- Status: extant
- Motto: Spes mea in Deo, My hope is in God

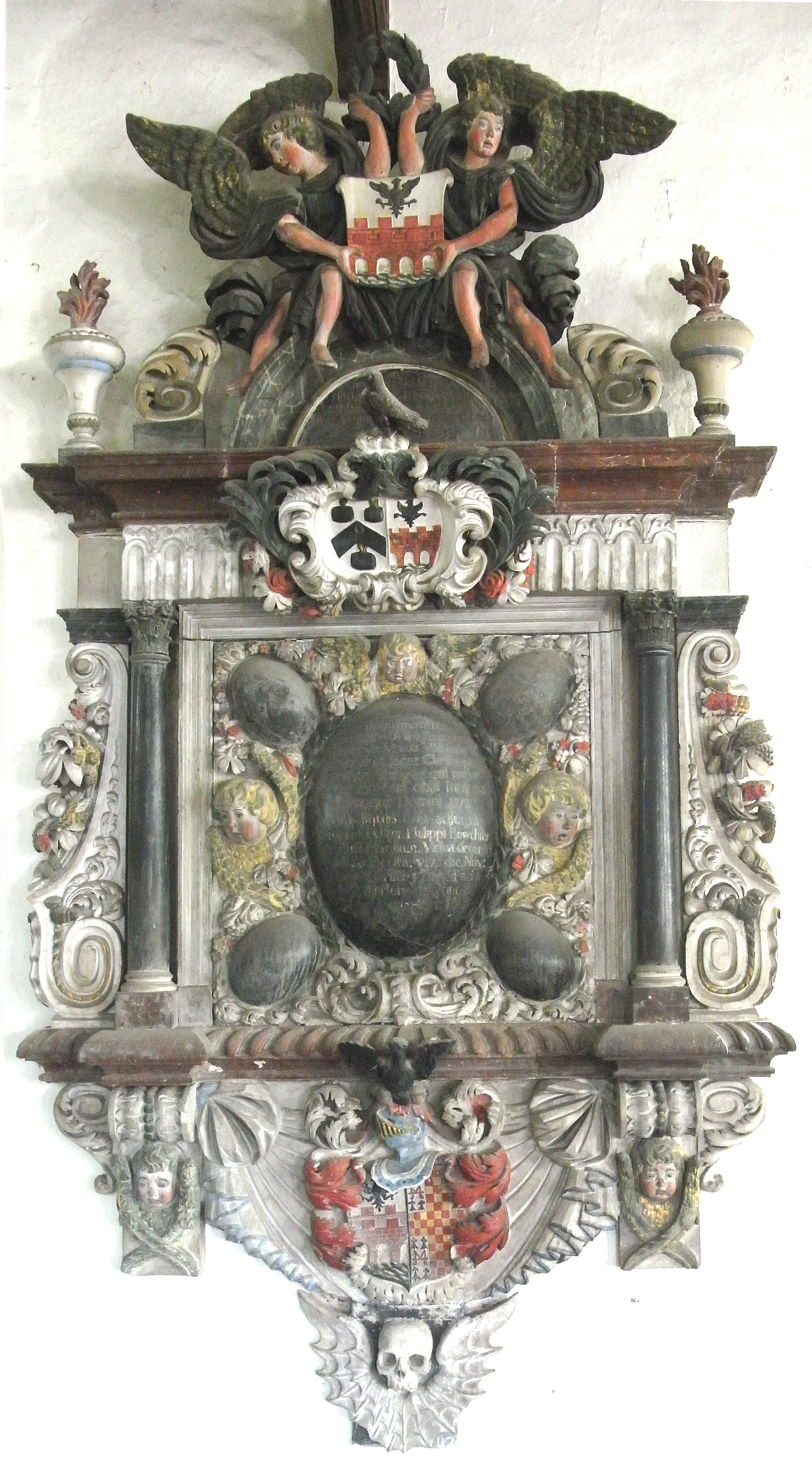
Mural monument to Christopher Lethbridge (d.1713) of Westaway in parish of Pilton, Devon, south aisle wall of Pilton Church, Devon

The Lethbridge Baronetcy, of Westaway House in Devon and Winkley Court in the County of Somerset, is a title in the Baronetage of the United Kingdom. It was created on 15 June 1804 for John Lethbridge, who was later Member of Parliament (MP) for Minehead in Somerset, from 1806 to 1807. The second Baronet sat as MP for Somerset between 1806 and 1812 and 1826 and 1830.

Westaway House in the parish of Pilton, near Barnstaple in North Devon was inherited by Christopher Lethbridge (d.1713) following his marriage to Margaret Bowchier, the daughter of Philip Bowchier (d.1687), the son of Roger Bowchier, vicar of Pilton during the Civil War and described as "of doubtful morals". Philip Bowchier had leased Westaway in 1666 from Sir John Chichester, 1st Baronet, of Raleigh (1623–1667), also in the parish of Pilton. It was as revealed by the 1664 hearth tax records then a modest house of only three hearths. Philip Bowchier had three sons also, to whom he bequeathed £10 each in his will dated 1686, but not one of these apparently inherited Westaway. In 1687 Christopher Lethbridge acquired a new lease for 1,000 years from the Chichesters, and shortly thereafter a new larger house was built on the site, which survives today. A mural monument to Christopher Lethbridge (d.1713) (one of whose sons was Christopher Lethbridge (d.1748)), exists high up on the south aisle wall of Pilton Church, and was described by Nikolaus Pevsner as "Big and sumptuous...with rather crude putto heads and elaborate achievement". After about 1780 it ceased to be occupied as a seat by the Lethbridge family, who let it to a series of tenants. It was sold in 1819 by Sir Thomas Buckler Lethbridge, 2nd Baronet (1778–1849) to James Whyte of Pilton House, Pilton.

The third baronet, Sir John Hesketh Lethbridge, was married three times and had 18 children. He was succeeded by his oldest surviving son, Sir Wroth Acland Lethbridge, who pursued an army career, as did the 5th and 6th baronets. The current holder of the title is Sir Thomas Periam Lethbridge (7th baronet).

In 1767 the Lethbridge family moved from Westaway to Sandhill Park, Bishops Lydeard in Somerset, which they occupied until 1913.

== Lethbridge baronets, of Westaway House and Winkley Court (1804) ==
- Sir John Lethbridge, 1st Baronet (died 1815). In 2010 it was discovered that he had an affair with Mary Jane de Vial, later Godwin, resulting in the birth of Claire Clairmont, and thus making him the grandfather of Lord Byron's daughter Allegra
- Sir Thomas Buckler Lethbridge, 2nd Baronet (1778–1849), married as his second wife Anne Goddard.
- Sir John Hesketh Lethbridge, 3rd Baronet (1798–1873)
- Sir Wroth Acland Lethbridge, 4th Baronet (1831–1902)
- Sir Wroth Periam Christopher Lethbridge, 5th Baronet (1863–1950)
- Sir Hector Wroth Lethbridge, 6th Baronet (1898–1978)
- Sir Thomas Periam Hector Noel Lethbridge, 7th Baronet (born 1950)

The heir apparent to the baronetcy is John Francis Buckler Noel Lethbridge (born 1977), and son George Anthony Thomas Lethbridge (born 2009)

Baronetage of the United Kingdom
Preceded by Walsh baronets	Lethbridge baronets of Westaway House and Winkley Court; 15 June 1804	Succeeded by Rae baronets
