= William Godwin the Younger =

English reporter and author

- Born: 1803
- Died: 8 September 1832 (aged 28–29)
- Occupations: reporter; author
- Parents: William Godwin; Mary Jane Vial Clairmont Godwin
- Relatives: Charles Clairmont (half-brother); Claire Clairmont (half-sister); Fanny Imlay (stepsister); Mary Shelley (half-sister)

William Godwin (1803 – 8 September 1832) was an English reporter and author. He was influenced by his father's (William Godwin's) work.

== Early life and education ==
Godwin was the only son of William Godwin the elder, by his second wife, Mary Jane formerly Clairmont. His elder half-siblings and step-siblings included Charles Clairmont, Claire Clairmont, Fanny Imlay, and Mary Shelley.

He was sent as a day boy to Charterhouse School at the age of eight; then, in 1814, to the school of the younger Dr. Burney at Greenwich; in 1818 to a commercial school at Woodford, Essex; and in 1819 to a mathematical school under Peter Nicholson. In 1820 his father tried to introduce him into Maudslay's engineering establishment at Lambeth, and afterwards to apprentice him to Nash the architect.

== Career as writer ==
The boy was wayward and restless, but in 1823 surprised his father by producing some literary essays, which were printed in the Weekly Examiner; and in the same year he became a reporter for the Morning Chronicle, a position which he retained till his death. He wrote occasional articles, one of which, The Executioner, was published in Blackwood's Magazine, and he founded a weekly Shakespeare club called "The Mulberries".

His elder sister Claire explained to her friend Jane Williams:

But in our family, if you cannot write an epic or novel, that by its originality knocks all other novels on the head, you are a despicable creature, not worth acknowledging.

== Later life ==
He died of cholera on 8 September 1832, during a global pandemic of the disease, leaving a widow but no children. He left a novel, Transfusion, somewhat in the vein of his father's Caleb Williams. It was published in three volumes in 1835, with a memoir prefixed by his father.

== Family tree ==
Family tree of William Godwin

Sir John Lethbridge (1746–1815)	Mary Jane Vial Clairmont (c. 1766–1841)	William Godwin (1756–1836)	Mary Wollstonecraft (1759–1797)	Gilbert Imlay (1754?–1828)
Lady Byron (1792–1860)	Lord Byron (1789–1824)	Claire Clairmont (1798–1879)	William Godwin the Younger (1803–1832)	Mary Shelley (1797–1851)	Percy Bysshe Shelley (1792–1822)	Fanny Imlay (1794–1816)
Ada Lovelace (1815–1852)	Allegra Byron (1817–1822)	William (1816–1819)	Clara Everina (1817–1818)	Sir Percy Shelley, 3rd Baronet (1819–1888)	Clara (1815–1815)

Notes:

Source: Tomalin, Claire (1992) [1980]. Shelley and His World. Penguin. p. 115. ISBN 0140171525.
