= Stockings (surname) =

Stockings is a surname. Notable people with the surname include:

- Craig Stockings (born 1974), Australian historian
- David Stockings (1944–2013), English cricketer
- Henry Stockings (1916–2015), English Second World War Royal Air Force officer and prisoner of war involved in the "Great Escape"

== See also ==
- Stocking (surname)
