= Stocking (surname) =

Stocking is a surname. Notable people with the surname include:

- Annie Stocking Boyce (1880–1973), née Stocking, American Presbyterian missionary teacher in Iran, founder and editor of a Persian-language women's journal
- Anthony Stocking (born 1951), British lightweight rower
- Barbara Stocking (born 1951), British civil servant
- Dave Stocking, British Trotskyist
- Dimies T. Stocking Denison (1852–1940), née Stocking, American businesswoman, philanthropist and clubwoman
- George W. Stocking Sr. (1892–1975), American economist
- George W. Stocking Jr. (1928–2013), American anthropologist, son of the above
- Hannah Stocking (born 1992), American internet personality
- Hobart Stocking (1846–1920), American politician
- Marion Kingston Stocking (1922–2009), American literary scholar, educator, editor, book reviewer, advocate for the arts, memoirist, and environmentalist
- May Stocking Knaggs (1847–1915), née Stocking, American suffragist

== See also ==
- Stockings (surname)
