= Fanny Imlay =

Daughter of Mary Wollstonecraft (1794–1816)

On Fanny Godwin

Her voice did quiver as we parted,
Yet knew I not that heart was broken
From which it came, and I departed
Heeding not the words then spoken.
Misery—O Misery,
This world is all too wide for thee.

— Percy Bysshe Shelley

Frances Imlay (14 May 1794 – 9 October 1816), also known as Fanny Godwin and Frances Wollstonecraft, was the daughter of the British feminist Mary Wollstonecraft and the American commercial speculator and diplomat Gilbert Imlay. Wollstonecraft wrote about her frequently in her later works. Fanny grew up in the household of the anarchist political philosopher William Godwin, the widower of her mother, with his second wife Mary Jane Clairmont and their combined family of five children. Fanny's half-sister Mary wrote Frankenstein and married Percy Bysshe Shelley, a leading Romantic poet, who composed a poem on Fanny's death.

Although Gilbert Imlay and Mary Wollstonecraft lived together happily for brief periods before and after the birth of Fanny, he left Wollstonecraft in France in the midst of the Revolution. In an attempt to revive their relationship, Wollstonecraft travelled to Scandinavia on business for him, taking the one-year-old Fanny with her, but the affair never rekindled. After falling in love with and marrying Godwin, Wollstonecraft died soon after giving birth in 1797, leaving the three-year-old Fanny in the hands of Godwin, along with their newborn daughter Mary.

Four years later, Godwin remarried, and his new wife, Mary Jane Clairmont, brought two children of her own into the marriage, most significantly Claire Clairmont. Wollstonecraft's daughters resented the new Mrs Godwin and the attention she paid to her own daughter. The Godwin household became an increasingly uncomfortable place to live as tensions rose and debts mounted. The teenaged Mary and Claire escaped by running off to the Continent with Shelley in 1814. Fanny, left behind, bore the brunt of her stepmother's anger. She became increasingly isolated from her family and died by suicide in 1816.

== Life ==
=== Birth ===
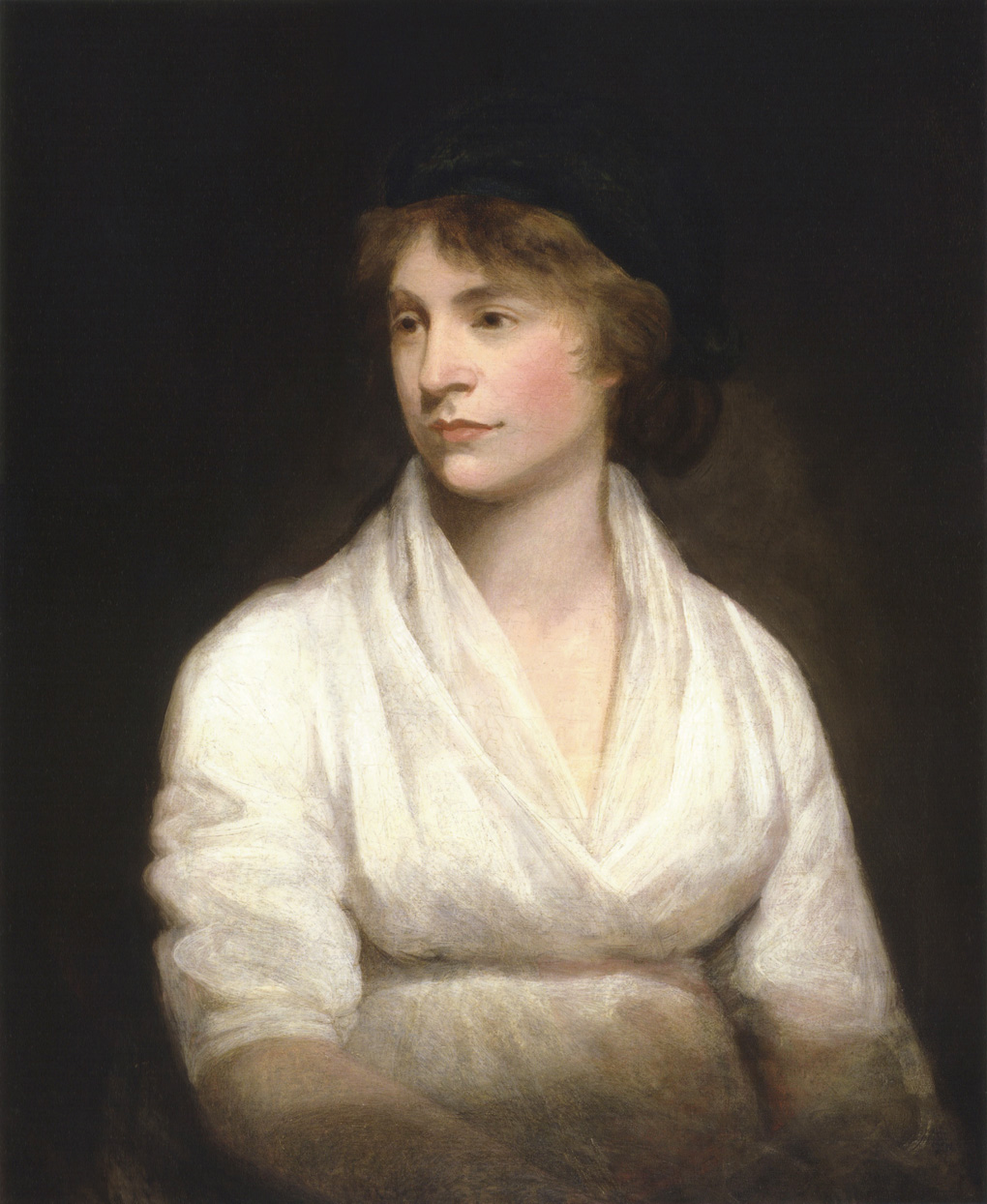
Mary Wollstonecraft by John Opie (c. 1797)

Fanny Wollstonecraft was the daughter of the British feminist writer Mary Wollstonecraft and the American entrepreneur Gilbert Imlay. Both had moved to France during the French Revolution, Wollstonecraft to practise the principles laid out in her seminal work A Vindication of the Rights of Woman (1792) and Imlay to engage in speculative business ventures. The two met and fell in love. At one point during Wollstonecraft and Imlay's relationship, the couple could meet only at a tollbooth between Paris and Neuilly, and it was there that their daughter was conceived; Fanny was therefore, in Godwin's words, a "barrier child". Frances "Fanny" Imlay, Wollstonecraft's first child, was born in Le Havre on 14 May 1794, or, as the birth certificate stated, on the 25th day of Floreal in the Second Year of the Republic, and named after Fanny Blood, her mother's closest friend. Although Imlay never married Wollstonecraft, he registered her as his wife at the American consulate to protect her once Britain and France went to war in February 1793. Most people, including Wollstonecraft's sisters, assumed they were married—and thus, by extension, that Fanny was legitimate—and she was registered as such in France.

=== Infancy and early childhood ===
Initially, the couple's life together was idyllic. Wollstonecraft playfully wrote to one friend: "My little Girl begins to suck so manfully that her father reckons saucily on her writing the second part of the R[igh]ts of Woman" [emphasis in original]. Imlay soon tired of Wollstonecraft and domestic life and left her for long periods of time. Her letters to him are full of needy expostulations, explained by most critics as the expressions of a deeply depressed woman but by some as a result of her circumstances—alone with an infant in the middle of the French Revolution.

Wollstonecraft returned to London in April 1795, seeking Imlay, but he rejected her; the next month she attempted to commit suicide, but he saved her life (it is unclear how). In a last attempt to win him back, she embarked upon a hazardous trip to Scandinavia from June to September 1795, with only her one-year-old daughter and a maid, in order to conduct some business for him. Wollstonecraft's journey was daunting not only because she was travelling to what some considered a nearly uncivilized region during a time of war, but also because she was travelling without a male escort. When she returned to England and realized that her relationship with Imlay was over, she attempted suicide a second time. She went out on a rainy night, walked around to soak her clothes, and then jumped into the River Thames, but a stranger rescued her.

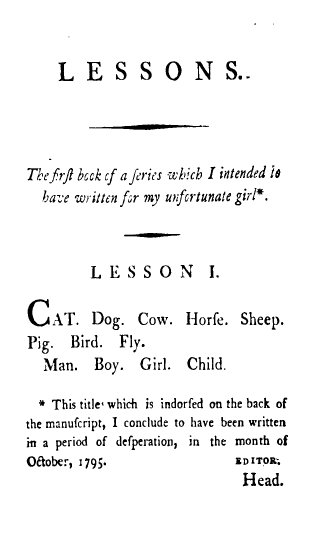
Before one of her suicide attempts, Wollstonecraft wrote at the top of the first page of Lessons: "The first book of a series which I intended to have written for my unfortunate girl."

Using her diaries and letters from her journey to Scandinavia, Wollstonecraft wrote a rumination on her travels and her relationship—Letters Written in Sweden, Norway, and Denmark (1796)—in which, among other things, she celebrated motherhood. Her maternal connection to her daughter prompted her to reflect on a woman's place in the world:

You know that as a female I am particularly attached to her—I feel more than a mother's fondness and anxiety, when I reflect on the dependent and oppressed state of her sex. I dread lest she should be forced to sacrifice her heart to her principles, or principles to her heart. With trembling hand I shall cultivate sensibility, and cherish delicacy of sentiment, lest, whilst I lend fresh blushes to the rose, I sharpen the thorns that will wound the breast I would fain guard—I dread to unfold her mind, lest it should render her unfit for the world she is to inhabit—Hapless woman! what a fate is thine!

Wollstonecraft lavished love and attention on her daughter. She began two books, drawn from her own experience, related to Fanny's care: a parenting manual entitled Letters on the Management of Infants and a reading primer entitled Lessons. In one section of Lessons, she describes weaning:

When you were hungry, you began to cry, because you could not speak. You were seven months without teeth, always sucking. But after you got one, you began to gnaw a crust of bread. It was not long before another came pop. At ten months you had four pretty white teeth, and you used to bite me. Poor mamma! Still I did not cry, because I am not a child, but you hurt me very much. So I said to papa, it is time the little girl should eat. She is not naughty, yet she hurts me. I have given her a crust of bread, and I must look for some other milk.

In 1797, Wollstonecraft fell in love with and married the philosopher William Godwin (she had become pregnant with his child). Godwin grew to love Fanny during his affair with Wollstonecraft; he brought her back a mug from Josiah Wedgwood's pottery factory with an "F" on it that delighted both mother and daughter. Wollstonecraft died in September of the same year, from complications giving birth to Mary Wollstonecraft Godwin, who survived. Three-year-old Fanny, who had been scarred from smallpox, was unofficially adopted by her stepfather and given the name of Godwin. Her copy of Wollstonecraft's only completed children's book, Original Stories from Real Life (1788), has the initials "F. G." written in large print in it. According to the dominant interpretation of Godwin's diary, it was not until Fanny turned twelve that she was informed in an important conversation with Godwin that he was not her natural father. In the only biography of Fanny, Janet Todd disputes this reading, arguing instead that the conversation was about Fanny's future. She finds it unlikely that Fanny would have been unaware of her origins in the open and liberal Godwin household.

After Wollstonecraft's death, Godwin and Joseph Johnson, Wollstonecraft's publisher and close friend, contacted Fanny's father, but he was uninterested in raising his child. (Neither Wollstonecraft nor her daughter ever saw Gilbert Imlay after 1796.) Wollstonecraft's two sisters, Eliza Bishop and Everina Wollstonecraft, Fanny's only two living female relatives, were anxious to care for her; Godwin, disliking them, turned down their offer. Several times throughout Fanny's childhood Wollstonecraft's sisters asked Godwin to allow them to raise their niece and each time he refused. Godwin himself did not seem particularly ready for parenthood and he now had two small children to raise and no steady source of income. However, he was determined to care for them. During these early years of Fanny's life, Joseph Johnson served as an "unofficial trustee" for her as he had occasionally for her mother. He even willed her £200, but Godwin owed Johnson so much money upon his death in 1809 that Johnson's heirs demanded Godwin pay the money back as part of his arrears.

=== Childhood ===
Although Godwin was fond of his children, he was, in many ways, ill-equipped to care for them. As Todd explains, he was constantly annoyed by their noise, demanding silence while he worked. However, when he took a trip to Dublin to visit Wollstonecraft's sisters, he missed the girls immensely and wrote to them frequently.

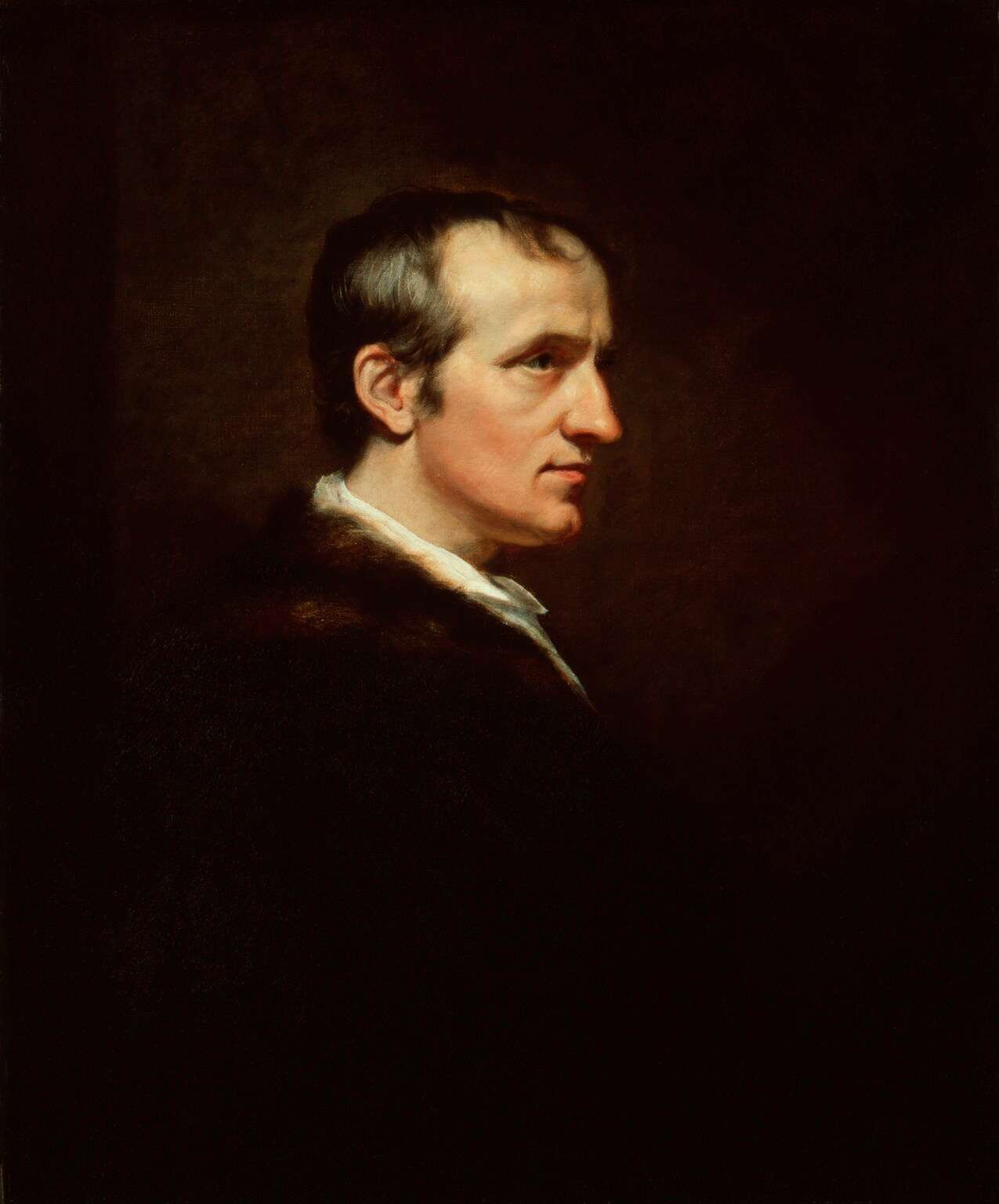
William Godwin, Fanny Imlay's stepfather (James Northcote, oil on canvas, 1802, the National Portrait Gallery)

On 21 December 1801, when Fanny was seven, Godwin married Mary Jane Clairmont, a neighbour with two children of her own: three-year-old Claire and six-year-old Charles. She had never been married and was looking, like Godwin, for financial stability. Although Clairmont was well-educated and well-travelled, most of Godwin's friends despised her, finding her vulgar and dishonest. They were astonished that Godwin could replace Mary Wollstonecraft with her. Fanny and her half-sister Mary disliked their stepmother and complained that she preferred her own children to them. On 28 March 1803, baby William was born to the couple.

Although Godwin admired Wollstonecraft's writings, he did not agree with her that women should receive the same education as men. Therefore, he occasionally read to Fanny and Mary from Sarah Trimmer's Fabulous Histories (1786) and Anna Laetitia Barbauld's Lessons for Children (1778–79), but, according to Todd, he did not take great pains with their educations and disregarded the books Wollstonecraft had written for Fanny. William St Clair, in his biography of the Godwins and the Shelleys, argues that Godwin and Wollstonecraft spoke extensively about the education they wanted for their children and that Godwin's writings in The Enquirer reflect these discussions. He contends that after Wollstonecraft's death Godwin wrote to a former pupil to whom she had been close, now Lady Mountcashell, asking her advice on how to raise and educate his daughters. In her biography of Mary Shelley, Miranda Seymour agrees with St Clair, arguing that "everything we know about his daughter's [Mary's and presumably Fanny's] early years suggests that she was being taught in a way of which her mother would have approved", pointing out that she had a governess, a tutor, a French-speaking stepmother, and a father who wrote children's books whose drafts he read to his own first. It was the new Mrs Godwin who was primarily responsible for the education given to the girls, but she taught her own daughter more, including French. Fanny received no formal education after her stepfather's marriage. Yet, the adult Imlay is described by Charles Kegan Paul, one of Godwin's earliest biographers, as "well educated, sprightly, clever, a good letter-writer, and an excellent domestic manager". Fanny excelled in drawing and was taught music. Despite Godwin's atheism, all of the children were taken to an Anglican church.

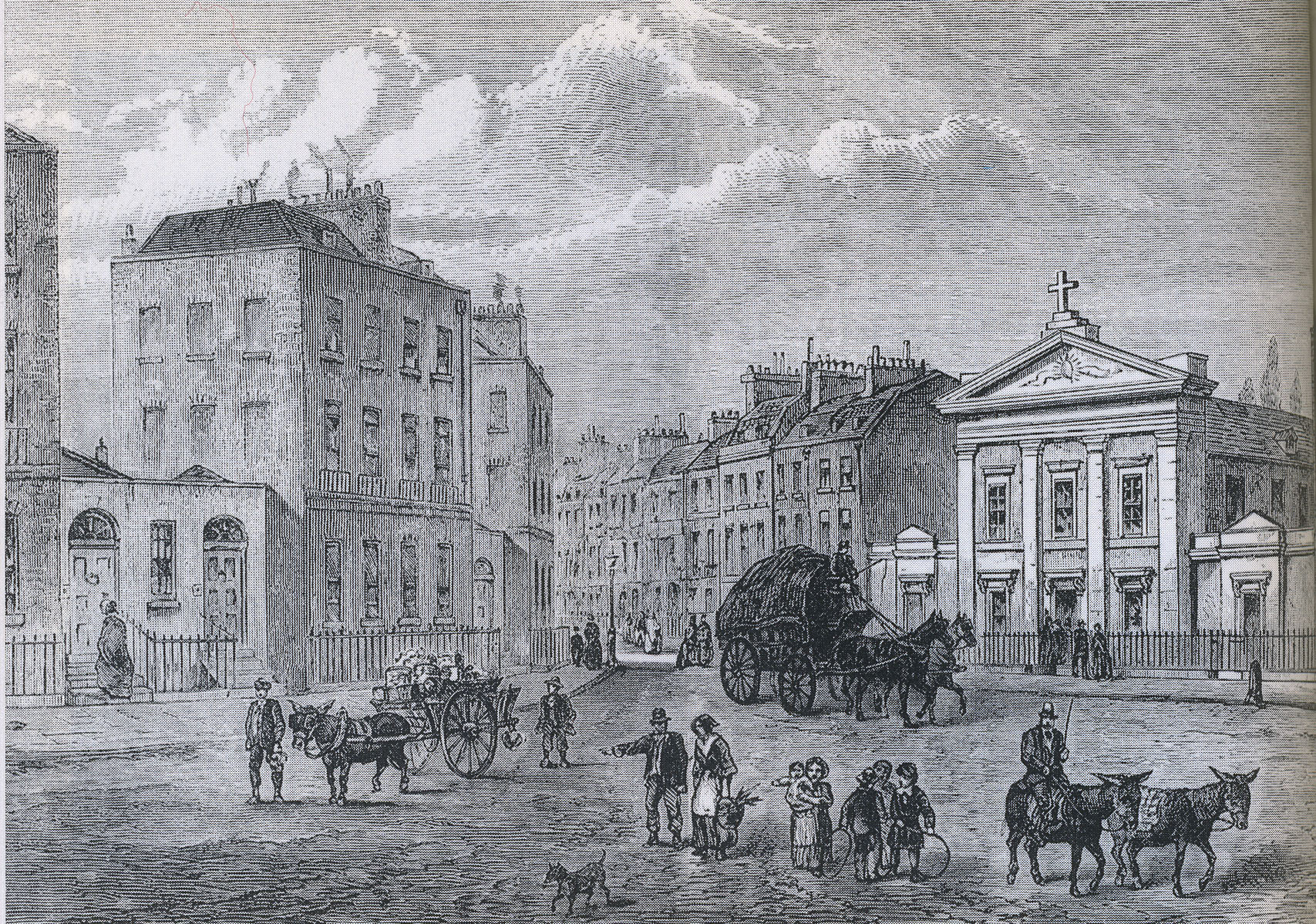
The Polygon (at left) in Somers Town, London, between Camden Town and St Pancras, where Fanny spent her childhood years

The Godwins were constantly in debt, so Godwin returned to writing to support the family. He and his wife started a Juvenile Library for which he wrote children's books. In 1807, when Fanny was 13, they moved from the Polygon, where Godwin had lived with Wollstonecraft, to 41 Skinner Street, near Clerkenwell, in the city's bookselling district. This took the family away from the fresh country air and into the dirty, smelly, inner streets of London. Although initially successful, the business gradually failed. The Godwins also continued to borrow more money than they could afford from generous friends such as publisher Joseph Johnson and Godwin devotee Francis Place.

As Fanny grew up, her father increasingly relied on her to placate tradespeople who demanded bills be paid and to solicit money from men such as Place. According to Todd and Seymour, Fanny believed in Godwin's theory that great thinkers and artists should be supported by patrons and she believed Godwin to be both a great novelist and a great philosopher. Throughout her life, she wrote letters asking Place and others for money to support Godwin's "genius" and she helped run the household so that he could work.

=== Teenage years ===
Godwin, never one to mince words, wrote about the differences he perceived between his two daughters:

My own daughter [Mary] is considerably superior in capacity to the one her mother had before. Fanny, the eldest, is of a quiet, modest, unshowy disposition, somewhat given to indolence, which is her greatest fault, but sober, observing, peculiarly clear and distinct in the faculty of memory, and disposed to exercise her own thoughts and follow her own judgment. Mary, my daughter, is the reverse of her in many particulars. She is singularly bold, somewhat imperious, and active of mind. Her desire for knowledge is great, and her perseverance in everything she undertakes is almost invincible. My own daughter is, I believe, very pretty; Fanny is by no means handsome, but in general prepossessing.

The intellectual world of the girls was widened by their exposure to the literary and political circles in which Godwin moved. For example, during former American vice-president Aaron Burr's self-imposed exile from the United States after his acquittal on treason charges, he often spent time with the Godwins. He greatly admired the works of Wollstonecraft and had educated his daughter according to the precepts of A Vindication of the Rights of Woman. He was anxious to meet the daughters of the woman he revered and referred to Fanny, Mary, and Claire as "goddesses". He spent most of his time talking with Fanny about political and educational topics. Burr was impressed by the Lancastrian teaching method and took Fanny to see a model school in 1811.

==== Percy, Mary, and Claire ====
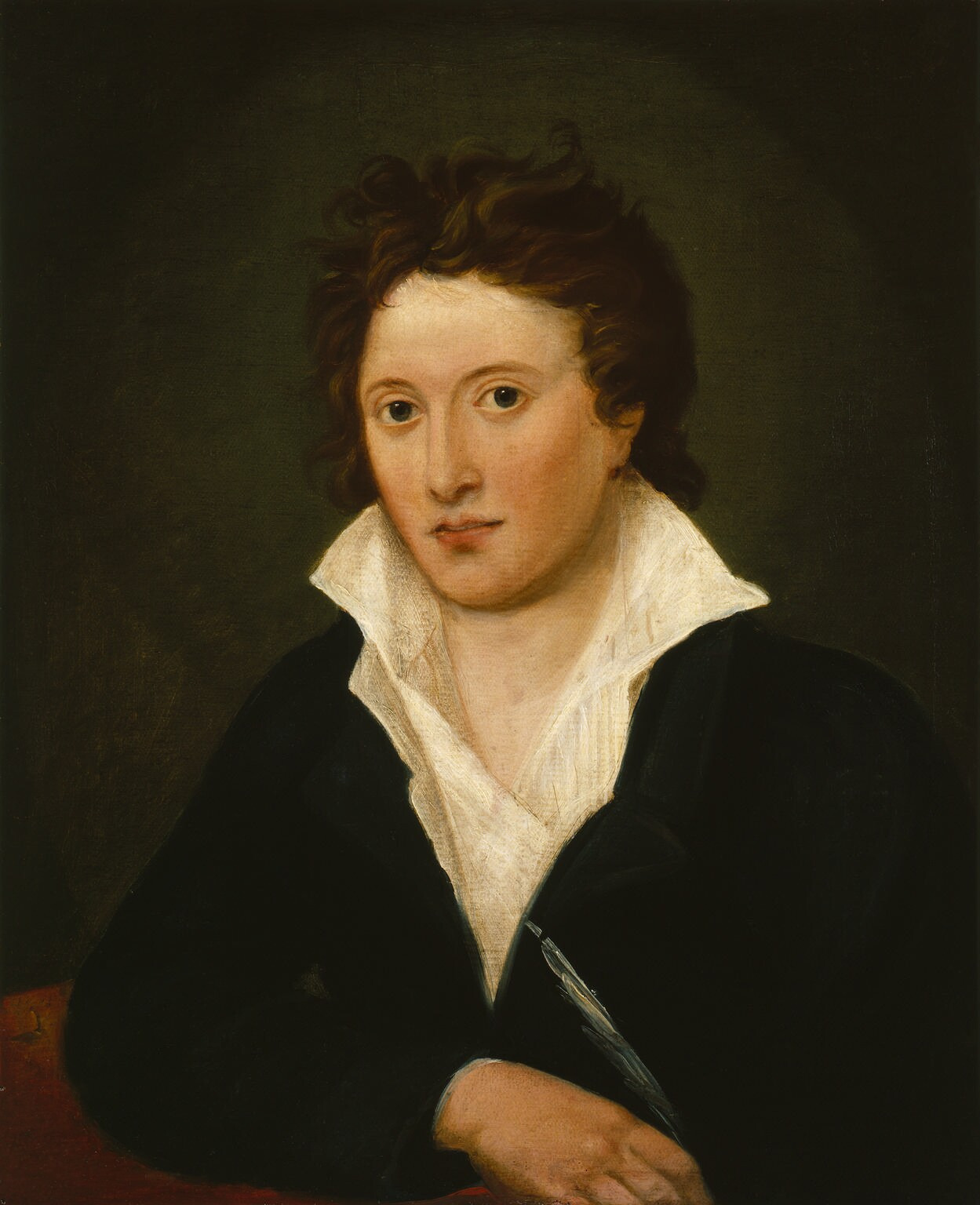
Radical Romantic poet Percy Bysshe Shelley was probably loved by all three Godwin sisters (Amelia Curran, 1819).

It was not Burr, but the Romantic poet and writer Percy Bysshe Shelley who had the greatest impact on Fanny and her sisters' lives. Impressed by Godwin's Political Justice, Shelley wrote to him and the two started corresponding. In 1812, Shelley asked if Fanny, then 18 and the daughter of one of his heroes, Mary Wollstonecraft, could come live with him, his new wife, and her sister. Having never actually met Shelley and being sceptical of his motivations (Shelley had eloped to marry his wife, Harriet), Godwin refused. When Shelley finally came to visit the Godwins, all three girls were enamoured of him, particularly Imlay. Both Shelley and Fanny were interested in discussing radical politics; for example, Shelley liked to act as if class were irrelevant, but she argued that it was significant in daily affairs.

In 1814, Shelley spent a considerable amount of time at the Godwins' and he and Fanny may have fallen in love. Later, Claire Clairmont claimed that they had been. Fanny was sent to Wales in May of that year; Todd speculates that Godwin was trying to separate her from Shelley while Seymour hints that Mrs Godwin was trying to improve her despondent mood. Meanwhile, the Godwin household became even more uncomfortable as Godwin sank further into debt and as relations between Mary and her stepmother became increasingly hostile. Mary Godwin consoled herself with Shelley and the two started a passionate love affair. When Shelley declared to Godwin that the two were in love, Godwin exploded in anger. However, he needed the money that Shelley, as an aristocrat, could and was willing to provide. Frustrated with the entire situation, Mary Godwin, Shelley, and Claire Clairmont ran off to Europe together on 28 June 1814. Godwin hurriedly summoned Fanny home from Wales to help him handle the situation. Her stepmother wrote that Fanny's "emotion was deep when she heard of the sad fate of the two girls; she cannot get over it". In the middle of this disaster, one of Godwin's protégés killed himself, and young William Godwin ran away from home and was missing for two days. When news of the girls' escapade became public, Godwin was pilloried in the press. Life in the Godwin household became increasingly strained.

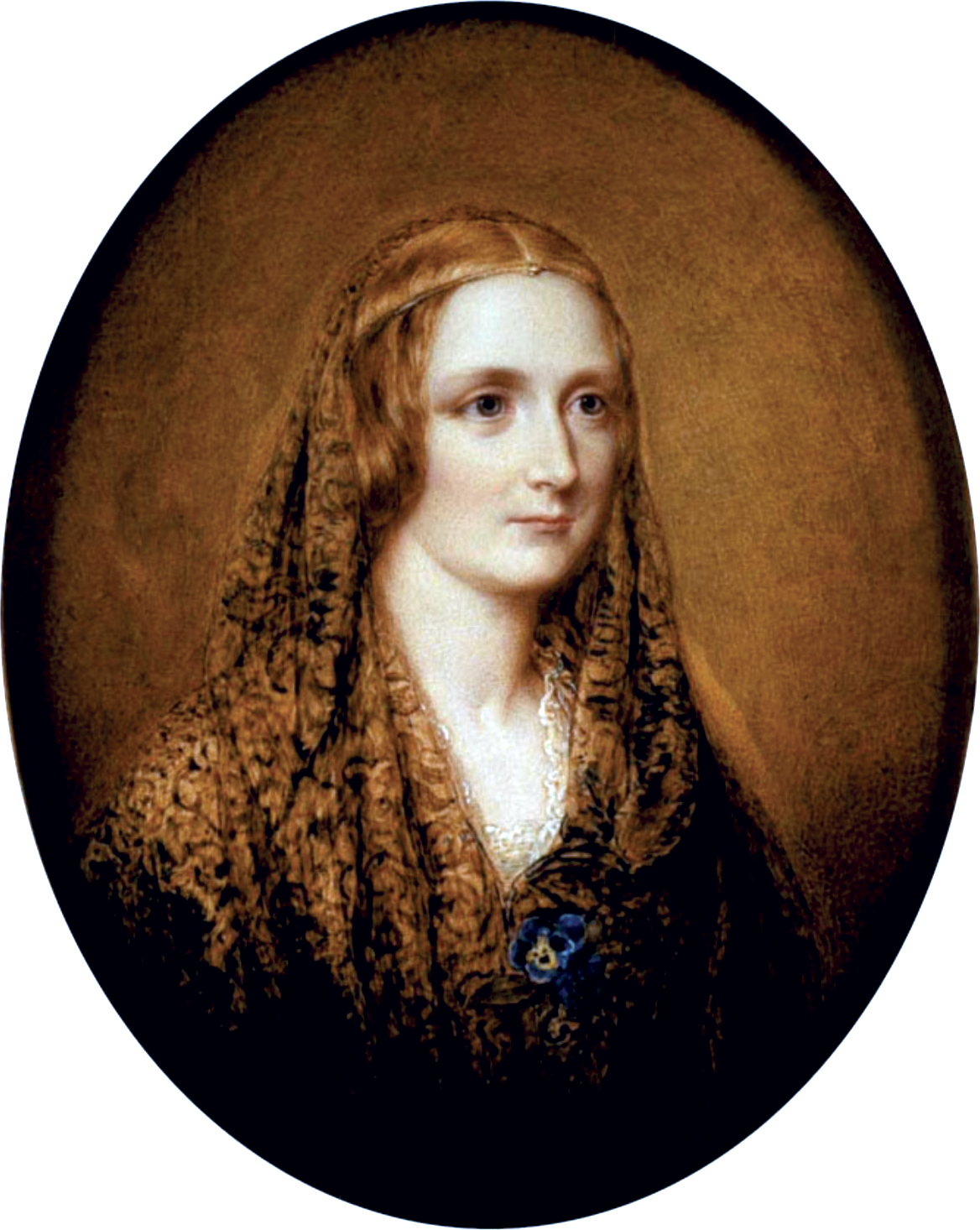
Mary Wollstonecraft Godwin, Fanny's half-sister and the (eventual) wife of Percy Bysshe Shelley (Reginald Easton, c. 1857)

When Mary Godwin, Claire Clairmont, and Shelley returned from the Continent in September 1814, they took a house together in London, enraging Godwin still further. Fanny felt pulled between the two households: she felt loyal both to her sisters and to her father. Both despised her decision not to choose a side in the family drama. As Seymour explains, Fanny was in a difficult position: the Godwin household felt Shelley was a dangerous influence and the Shelley household ridiculed her fear of violating social conventions. Also, her aunts were considering her for a teaching position at this time, but were reluctant because of Godwin's shocking Memoirs of the Author of A Vindication of the Rights of Woman (1798). Seymour writes, the "few timid visits Fanny made to see Mary and [Claire] in London were acts of great courage; she got little thanks for them". Although instructed by Godwin not to speak to Shelley and her sisters, Fanny warned them of creditors who knew of Shelley's return (he also was in debt). Her attempts to persuade Clairmont to return to the Godwins' convinced Shelley that she was of Godwin's party and he began to distrust her. Fanny was also still responsible for soliciting money from Shelley in order to repay her father's debts; despite Shelley's essential elopement with two of his daughters, Godwin agreed to accept £1,200 from Shelley. When Mary Godwin gave birth to a daughter in February 1815, she immediately sent for Fanny, particularly as both she and the infant were ill. Godwin chastised Fanny for disobeying his orders not to see her half-sister and her misery increased. After the death of the child, Fanny paid more frequent visits to the couple.

Soon after, Clairmont became a lover of the Romantic poet Lord Byron, and Mary Godwin and Shelley had a second child on 24 January 1816, who was named William after Godwin. In February, Fanny went to visit the Shelleys, who had settled in Bishopsgate. Godwin's debts continued to mount, and while he demanded money from Shelley, Godwin still refused to see either him or his daughter. At this time, Charles Clairmont (Fanny's step-brother), frustrated with the tension in the Godwin household, left for France and refused to help the family any further. At around the same time, Claire Clairmont, Mary Godwin, and Shelley left for the Continent, seeking Byron. Godwin was aghast. He relied on Shelley's money, and the stain on his family's reputation only increased when the public learned that the group had left to join the rakish Byron.

Amidst all of this family turmoil, Fanny still found time to ponder larger social issues. The utopian socialist Robert Owen came to visit Godwin in the summer of 1816 and he and Fanny discussed the plight of the working poor in Britain. She agreed with many of Owen's proposals, but not all of them. She decided, in the end, that his utopian scheme was too "romantic", because it depended heavily on the goodwill of the rich to sacrifice their wealth. That same summer, George Blood—the brother of Fanny's namesake—came to meet her for the first time and told her stories of her mother. After this meeting she wrote to Mary Godwin and Shelley: "I have determined never to live to be a disgrace to such a mother... I have found that if I will endeavour to overcome my faults I shall find being's [sic] to love and esteem me" [emphasis in original].

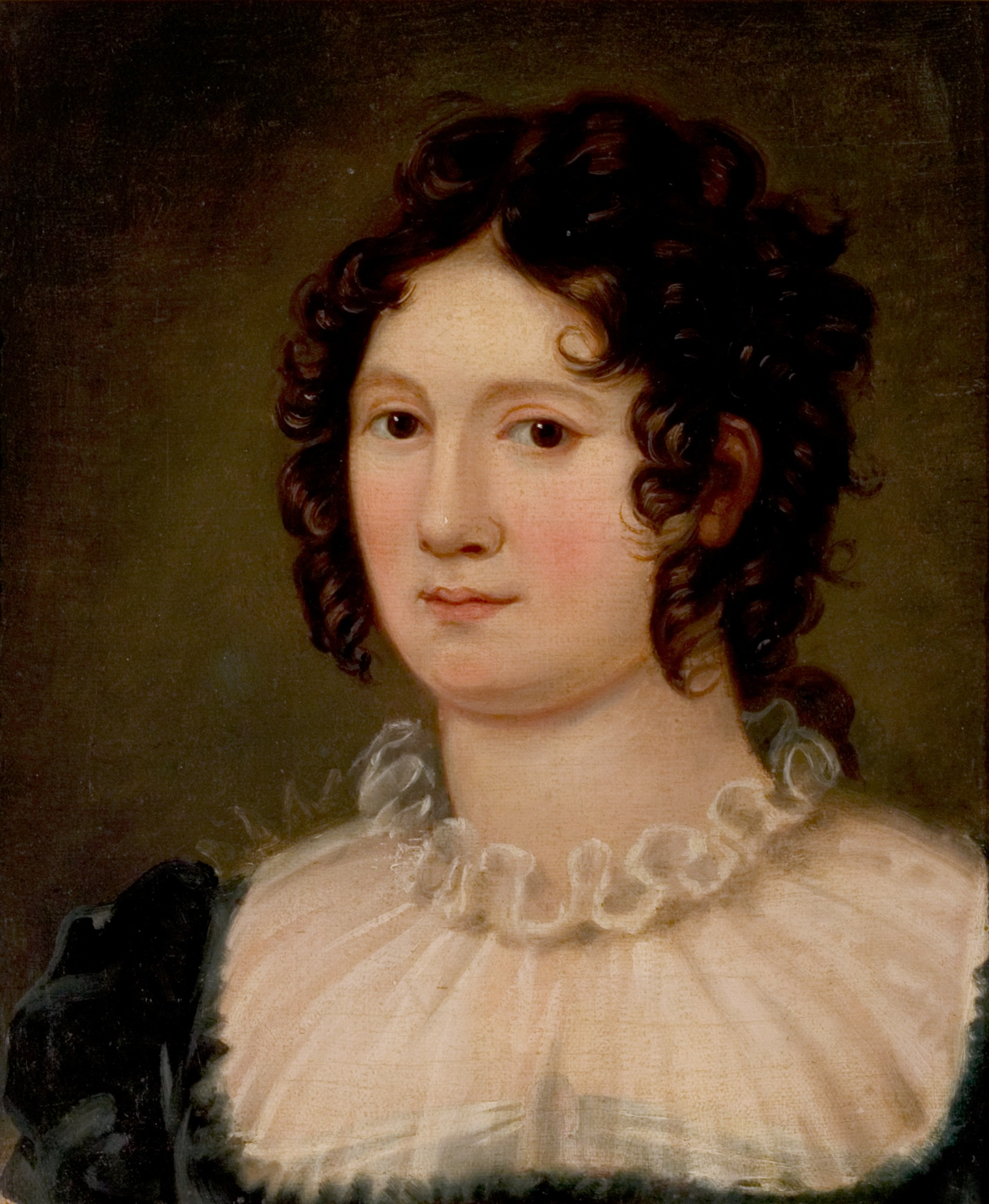
Claire Clairmont, Fanny's sister by adoption and a mistress of Lord Byron (Amelia Curran, 1819)

Before Mary Godwin, Clairmont, and Shelley had left for the Continent, Fanny and Mary had had a major argument and no chance to come to a reconciliation. Fanny attempted in her letters to Mary to smooth over the relationship, but her sense of loneliness and isolation in London was palpable. She wrote to Mary of "the dreadful state of mind I generally labour under & which I in vain endeavour to get rid of". Many scholars attribute Fanny's increasing unhappiness to Mrs Godwin's hostility towards her. Kegan, and others, contend that Fanny was subject to the same "extreme depression to which her mother had been subject, and which marked other members of the Wollstonecraft family". Wandering amongst the mountains of Switzerland, frustrated with her relationship with Shelley, and engrossed by the writing of Frankenstein, her sister was unsympathetic.

The group returned from the Continent, with a pregnant Clairmont, and settled in Bath (to protect her reputation, they attempted to hide the pregnancy). Fanny saw Shelley twice in September 1816; according to Todd's interpretation of Fanny's letters, Fanny had earlier tried to solicit an invitation to join the group in Europe and she repeated these appeals when she saw Shelley in London. Todd believes that Fanny begged to be allowed to stay with them because life in Godwin's house was unbearable, with the constant financial worries and Mrs Godwin's insistent haranguing, and that Shelley refused, concerned with anyone learning about Clairmont's condition, most of all someone he believed might inform Godwin (Shelley was being sued by his wife and was worried about his own reputation). After Shelley left, Todd explains that Fanny wrote to Mary "to make clear again her longing to be rescued".

== Death ==
=== Theories ===
It is only poets that are eternal benefactors of their fellow creatures—& the real ones never fail of giving us the highest degree of pleasure we are capable of ... they are in my oppinion [sic] nature & art united—& as such never failing.

— Fanny Godwin to Percy Bysshe Shelley and Mary Shelley, 1816

On 9 October 1816, Fanny left Godwin's house in London and died by suicide by taking an overdose of laudanum at an inn in Swansea, Wales; she was 22. The details surrounding her death and her motivations are disputed. Most of the letters regarding the incident were destroyed or are missing. In his 1965 article "Fanny Godwin's Suicide Re-examined", B. R. Pollin lays out the major theories that had been put forward regarding her suicide and which continue to be promulgated:

- Fanny had just learned of her illegitimate birth.
- Mrs Godwin became more cruel to Fanny after Mary Godwin and Claire Clairmont ran off with Percy Shelley.
- Fanny had been refused a position at her aunts' school in Ireland.
- Fanny was depressive, and her condition was aggravated by the state of the Godwin household.
- Fanny was in love with Percy Shelley and distraught that Mary and he had fallen in love.

Pollin dismisses the first of these, as have most later biographers, arguing that Fanny had access to her mother's writings and Godwin's Memoirs of the Author of A Vindication of the Rights of Woman which openly discuss the circumstances of her birth. Fanny herself even makes this distinction in letters to her half-sister Mary Godwin.

Pollin is also sceptical of the second explanation, pointing to Fanny's letter to Mary of 3 October 1816 in which she defended her step-mother: "Mrs. Godwin would never do either of you a deliberate injury. Mamma and I are not great friends, but always alive to her virtues, I am anxious to defend her from a charge so foreign to her character."

Pollin finds no evidence that Fanny had been refused a position at her aunts' school, only that such a scheme may have been "in contemplation", as Godwin later wrote, although Seymour grants this explanation some plausibility. St Clair claims that Fanny was on her way to join her maternal aunts in Ireland when she decided to die by suicide. He believes that it was to be a probationary visit, to see if she could be a teacher in their school. Godwin's modern biographer, Richard Holmes, dismisses this story.

In his survey of the letters of the Godwins and the Shelleys, Pollin comes to the conclusion that Fanny was not depressive. She is frequently described as happy and looking toward the future and describes herself this way. The mentions of melancholia and sadness are specific and related to particular events and illness. Richard Holmes, in his biography of Percy Shelley, argues that "her agonizing and loveless suspension between the Godwin and Shelley households was clearly the root circumstance" of her suicide. Godwin biographer and philosopher Don Locke argues the cause of her suicide was "most probably because she could absorb no more of the miseries of Skinner Street, her father's inability to pay his debts or write his books, her mother's unending irritability and spitefulness", all of which she blamed on herself.

Pollin largely agrees with Todd, speculating that Fanny saw Percy Shelley in Bath and he "somehow failed her", causing her to die by suicide. Seymour and others speculate that Shelley's only failure was to live up to his financial promises to Godwin and it was this that helped push Fanny over the edge; she was convinced, like her father, "that the worthy have an absolute right to be supported by those who have the worth to give". Todd, on the other hand, agrees with Pollin and speculates that Fanny went to see Mary Godwin and Shelley. Todd argues that Fanny had affection for Shelley and felt that his home was her only haven. Relying on scraps of poetry that Shelley may have written after Fanny's death, Todd concludes that Shelley saw her in Bath and rejected her pleas because he needed to protect Claire's reputation as well as his own at this time. Todd also notes that Fanny had worn her mother's stays, which were embroidered with the initials "M.W.", and the nicest clothes she owned. She had adorned herself with a Swiss gold watch sent to her from Geneva by the Shelleys and a necklace, in order to make a good impression. After Shelley rejected her, Todd concludes, Fanny decided to end her life.

=== Suicide and aftermath ===
Duty kept her with us; but I am afraid her affections were with them.

— William Godwin on Fanny Godwin

On the night of 9 October, Fanny checked into the Mackworth Arms Inn in Swansea and instructed the chambermaid not to disturb her. The same night Mary Godwin, staying in Bath with Shelley, received a letter Fanny had mailed earlier from Bristol. Her father in London also received a letter. The alarming nature of the letters prompted both Godwin and Shelley to set out for Bristol at once (although they travelled separately). By the time they tracked her to Swansea on 11 October, they were too late. Fanny was found dead in her room on 10 October, having taken a fatal dose of laudanum, and it was only Shelley who stayed to deal with the situation. Fanny left behind an unaddressed note, describing herself as "unfortunate", perhaps referring to Mary Wollstonecraft's description of her as "my unfortunate girl" in the note she wrote on "Lessons" before she herself attempted suicide:

I have long determined that the best thing I could do was to put an end to the existence of a being whose birth was unfortunate, and whose life has only been a series of pain to those persons who have hurt their health in endeavouring to promote her welfare. Perhaps to hear of my death will give you pain, but you will soon have the blessing of forgetting that such a creature ever existed as

The note appears to have originally been signed, but the name was torn off or burned off so that her body could not be identified. When the announcement was printed in the local newspaper, The Cambrian, therefore, it did not refer to Fanny specifically.

At the inquest, Fanny was declared "dead", rather than a suicide or an insanity victim, which saved her body from various indignities. Todd speculates that Shelley arranged for Fanny to be declared "dead" (an appellation more common for the well-to-do) and removed any identifying items, such as her name on the note. She also concludes that to protect the rest of the family, he refused to claim her body. No one else claimed Fanny's body and it was most likely buried in the graveyard of St. John-Juxta-Swansea (now Saint Matthew's Churchyard). In fact, Godwin wrote to Percy Shelley:

Do nothing to destroy the obscurity she so much desired, that now rests upon the event. It was, as I said, her last wish ... Think what is the situation of my wife & myself, now deprived of all our children but the youngest [William]; & do not expose us to those idle questions, which to a mind in anguish is one of the severest trials.

We are at this moment in doubt whether during the first shock we shall not say she is gone to Ireland to her aunts, a thing that had been in contemplation ... What I have most of all in horror is the public papers; & I thank you for your caution as it might act on this.

Because suicide was considered scandalous, disreputable, and sinful at the time, which might have damaged Godwin's business, the family told various stories regarding Imlay's death in order to cover up the truth, including that she had gone on vacation, that she had died of a cold in Wales, that she had died of an "inflammatory fever", that she was living with her mother's sisters, or, if forced to admit suicide, that Fanny killed herself because Shelley loved Mary Godwin and not her. Neither Percy nor Mary mention Fanny's death in their surviving letters from this time. Claire Clairmont claimed in a letter to Byron that Percy became ill because of her death, but as Holmes notes, there is no other evidence for this assertion. Yet Locke writes that Shelley told Byron he felt "a far severer anguish" over Fanny's suicide than over Harriet's (his wife's) suicide just two months later.

While there is no known image of Fanny, a few months after her death, Shelley penned the poem quoted at the beginning of this article. As Seymour writes, "[p]ublished by Mary without comment, it has always been supposed to allude to his last meeting with her half-sister."

== Family tree ==
Family tree of William Godwin

Sir John Lethbridge (1746–1815)	Mary Jane Vial Clairmont (c. 1766–1841)	William Godwin (1756–1836)	Mary Wollstonecraft (1759–1797)	Gilbert Imlay (1754?–1828)
Lady Byron (1792–1860)	Lord Byron (1789–1824)	Claire Clairmont (1798–1879)	William Godwin the Younger (1803–1832)	Mary Shelley (1797–1851)	Percy Bysshe Shelley (1792–1822)	Fanny Imlay (1794–1816)
Ada Lovelace (1815–1852)	Allegra Byron (1817–1822)	William (1816–1819)	Clara Everina (1817–1818)	Sir Percy Shelley, 3rd Baronet (1819–1888)	Clara (1815–1815)

Notes:

Source: Tomalin, Claire (1992) [1980]. Shelley and His World. Penguin. p. 115. ISBN 0140171525.

== Bibliography ==
- Gittings, Robert and Jo Manton. Claire Clairmont and the Shelleys 1798–1879. New York: Oxford University Press, 1995. ISBN 0-19-818351-8.
- Holmes, Richard. Footsteps: Adventures of a Romantic Biographer. New York: Viking, 1985. ISBN 0-670-32353-5.
- Holmes, Richard. Shelley: the Pursuit. 1974. London: Harper Perennial, 2005. ISBN 0-00-720458-2.
- Locke, Don. A Fantasy of Reason: The Life and Thought of William Godwin. London: Routledge & Kegan Paul, 1980. ISBN 0-7100-0387-0.
- Pollin, B. R. "Fanny Godwin's Suicide Re-examined". Études Anglaises 18:3 (1965): 258–68.
- Seymour, Miranda. Mary Shelley. London: John Murray, 2000. ISBN 0-7195-5711-9.
- St Clair, William. The Godwins and the Shelleys: The biography of a family. New York: W. W. Norton & Co., 1989. ISBN 0-393-02783-X.
- Todd, Janet. Death & the Maidens: Fanny Wollstonecraft and the Shelley Circle. Berkeley: Counterpoint, 2007. ISBN 978-1-58243-339-4; (NB "Fanny Wollstonecraft" here = Fanny Imlay).
- Todd, Janet. Mary Wollstonecraft: A Revolutionary Life. London: Weidenfeld and Nicolson, 2000. ISBN 0-231-12184-9.
- Tomalin, Claire. The Life and Death of Mary Wollstonecraft. Rev. ed. New York: Penguin, 1992. ISBN 0-14-016761-7.
- Verhoeven, Wil. Gilbert Imlay: Citizen of the World. London: Pickering & Chatto, 2008. ISBN 1-85196-859-8.
