= Claire Clairmont =

Mary Shelley's stepsister, mother of Byron's daughter (1798–1879)

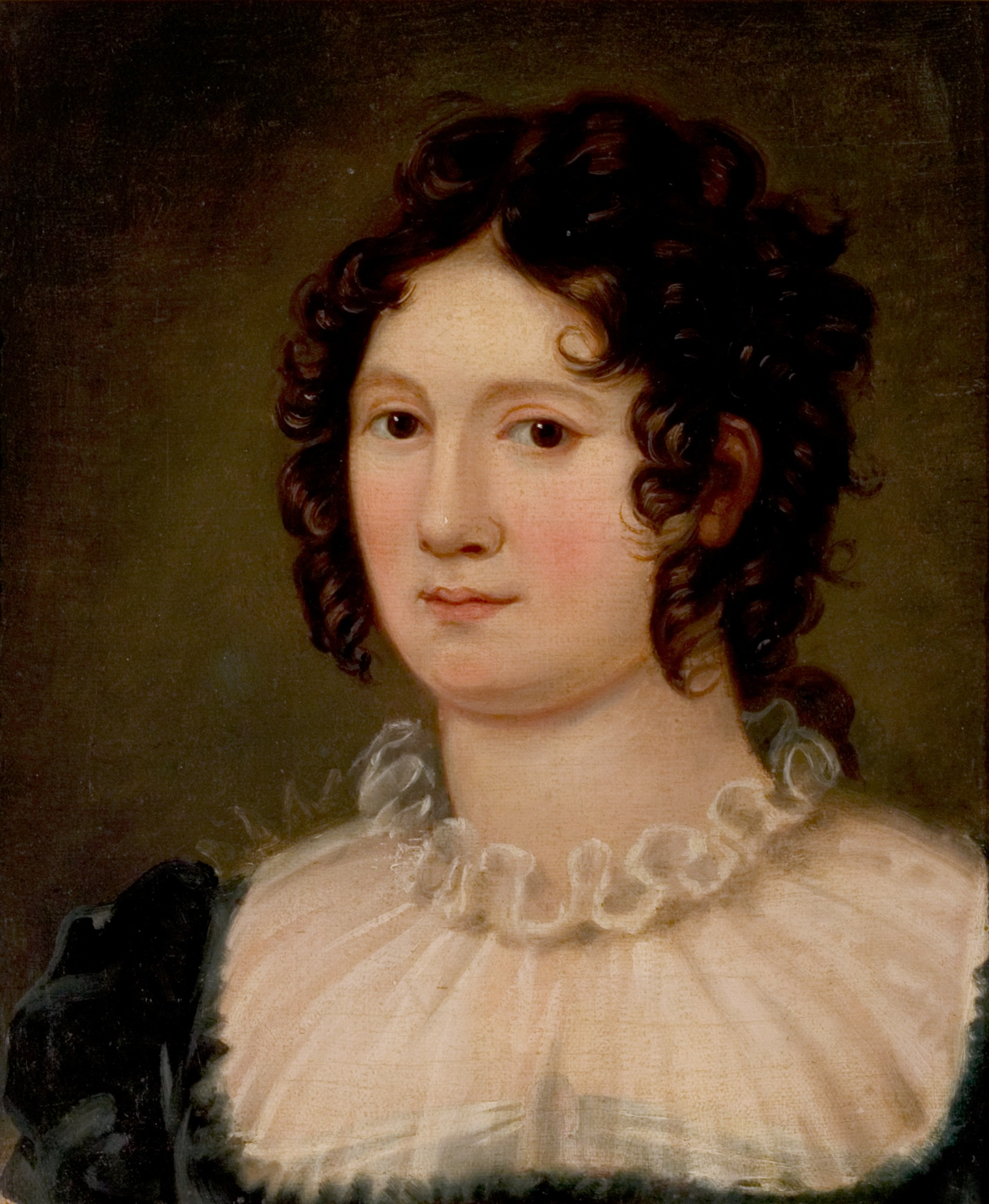
- Clairmont in 1819, painted by Amelia Curran
- Born: Clara Mary Jane Clairmont; 27 April 1798; Brislington, Bristol, England
- Died: 19 March 1879 (aged 80); Florence, Italy
- Occupations: governess; writer
- Partner: Lord Byron
- Children: Allegra Byron
- Parents: Mary Jane Vial Clairmont Godwin; John Lethbridge
- Relatives: William Godwin the Younger (half-brother); William Godwin (stepfather); Mary Shelley (stepsister)

Clara Mary Jane Clairmont (27 April 1798 – 19 March 1879), commonly known as Claire Clairmont, was the stepsister of English writer Mary Shelley and the mother of Lord Byron's daughter Allegra. She is thought to be the subject of a poem by Percy Bysshe Shelley.

== Early life ==
Clairmont was born in 1798 in Brislington, near Bristol, England, the second child and only daughter of Mary Jane Vial Clairmont. Throughout her childhood, she was known as Jane. In 2010 the identity of her father was discovered to be John Lethbridge (1746–1815, after 1804 Sir John Lethbridge, 1st Baronet) of Sandhill Park, near Taunton in Somerset. Her mother had identified him as a "Charles Clairmont", adopting the name Clairmont for herself and her children to disguise their illegitimacy. It appears that the father of her first child, Charles, was Charles Abram Marc Gaulis, "a merchant and member of a prominent Swiss family, whom she met in Cádiz".

In December 1801, when Clairmont was three years old, her mother married a neighbour, the writer and philosopher William Godwin. This brought her two stepsisters: Godwin's daughter, later Mary Shelley, only eight months her senior, and his stepdaughter Fanny Imlay, a couple of years older. Both were the daughters of Mary Wollstonecraft, who had died four years before, but whose presence continued to be felt in the household. The new couple soon became the parents of a son, which completed the family.

All five children were influenced by Godwin's radical anarchist philosophical beliefs. Both parents were well-educated and they co-wrote children's primers on Biblical and classical history, and ran a bookshop and publishers known as the Juvenile Library. Godwin encouraged all of his children to read widely and give lectures from early childhood.

Mary Jane Clairmont was a sharp-tongued woman, who often quarrelled with Godwin and favoured her own children over her husband's. She contrived to send her volatile and emotionally intense daughter to boarding school for a time, so providing her with more formal education than her stepsisters. Unlike Mary, Claire Clairmont was fluent in French as a teenager and was later credited with fluency in five languages. Despite their different treatment, the girls grew close and remained in contact for the rest of their lives.

== Travels through Europe with the Shelleys ==
At 16, Clairmont was a lively brunette with a good singing voice and a hunger for recognition. Her home life had become increasingly tense as her stepfather William Godwin sank deeper into debt and her mother's relations with Godwin's daughter Mary became more strained. Clairmont aided her stepsister's clandestine meetings with Percy Bysshe Shelley, who had professed a belief in free love and soon left his own wife, Harriet, and two small children to be with Mary. When Mary ran away with Shelley in July 1814, Clairmont went with them. Clairmont's mother traced the group to an inn in Calais, but could not make Clairmont go home with her. Godwin needed the financial assistance that the aristocratic Shelley could provide.

Clairmont remained in the Shelley household in their wanderings across Europe. The three young people traipsed across war-torn France and into Switzerland, fancying themselves as characters in a romantic novel, as Mary Shelley later recalled, but always reading widely, writing, and discussing the creative process. On the journey, Clairmont read Rousseau, Shakespeare and the works of Mary's mother, Mary Wollstonecraft. "What shall poor Cordelia do – Love & be silent", Clairmont wrote in her journal while reading King Lear. "Oh [th]is is true – Real Love will never [sh]ew itself to the eye of broad day – it courts the secret glades." Clairmont's emotions were so stirred by Cordelia that she had one of her "horrors", a hysterical fit, Mary Shelley recorded in her own journal entry for the same day. Clairmont, who was surrounded by poets and writers, also made her own literary attempts. During the summer of 1814, she started a story titled The Idiot, which has since been lost. In 1817–1818, she wrote a book, which Percy Bysshe Shelley tried without success to have published. Although Clairmont lacked the literary talent of her stepsister and brother-in-law, she always longed to take centre stage. It was during this period that she changed her name from "Jane", first to "Clara" and finally to the more romantic-sounding "Claire".

=== Relationship with Lord Byron ===
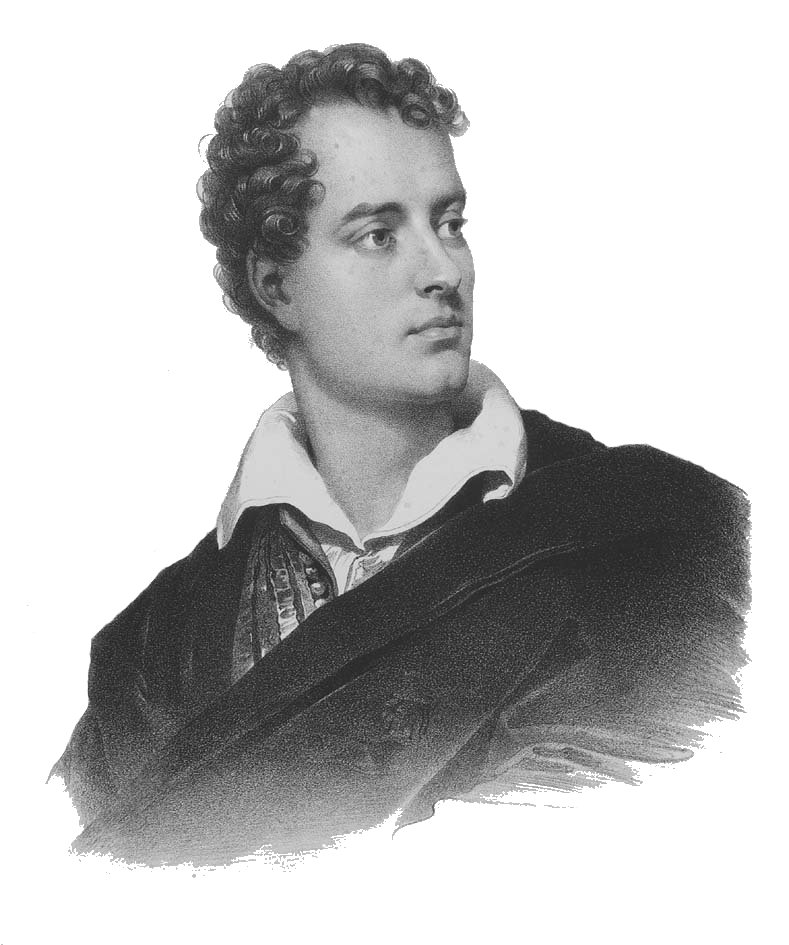
Lord Byron

Any romantic designs Clairmont might have had on Shelley were frustrated initially, but she did bring the Shelleys into contact with Lord Byron, with whom she entered into an affair before he left England in 1816 to live abroad. (A year marked by agricultural failures and widespread European famine, but also of significant literary advances as the Godwin-Shelley-Byron circle holed up indoors, 1816 would later be known as the "year without a summer".) Clairmont hoped to become a writer or an actress and wrote to Byron asking for "career advice" in March 1816, when she was almost 18. Byron was a director at the Drury Lane Theatre. Clairmont later followed up her letters with visits, sometimes bringing Mary, whom she seemed to suggest Byron might also find attractive. "Do you know I cannot talk to you when I see you? I am so awkward and only feel inclined to take a little stool and sit at your feet", Clairmont wrote to Byron. She "bombarded him with passionate daily communiqués", telling him he need only accept "that which it has long been the passionate wish of my heart to give you." She arranged for them to meet at a country inn. Byron, in a depressed state after the breakup of his marriage to Annabella Milbanke and the scandal over his relationship with his half-sister Augusta Leigh, made it very clear to Clairmont before he left that she would not be a part of his life, but she remained determined to change his mind.

She convinced Mary and Percy Shelley that they should follow Byron to Switzerland, where they met him and his personal physician, John William Polidori, at the Villa Diodati by Lake Geneva. It is unknown whether Clairmont knew she was pregnant with Byron's child at the commencement of the trip, but it soon became apparent to both her travelling companions and to Byron not long after their arrival at his door. At first he maintained his refusal of Clairmont's companionship and allowed her to be in his presence only in the company of the Shelleys; later, they resumed their sexual relationship for a time in Switzerland. Clairmont and Mary also made fair copies of Byron's current work-in-progress, Childe Harold's Pilgrimage.

Clairmont was the only lover, other than Caroline Lamb, whom Byron referred to as a "little fiend". Confessing the affair in a letter to his half-sister Augusta Leigh, Byron wrote:

What could I do? – a foolish girl – in spite of all I could say or do – would come after me – or rather went before me – for I found her here.... I could not exactly play the Stoic with a woman – who had scrambled eight hundred miles to unphilosophize me."

He referred to her also in a letter to Douglas Kinnaird (20 January 1817):

You know – & I believe saw once that odd-headed girl [Claire Clairmont] – who introduced herself to me shortly before I left England – but you do not know – that I found her with Shelley and her sister at Geneva – I never loved her nor pretended to love her – but a man is a man – & if a girl of eighteen comes prancing to you at all hours of the night – there is but one way – the suite of all this is that she was with child – & returned to England to assist in peopling that desolate island... This comes of "putting it about" (as Jackson calls it) & be dammed to it – and thus people come into the world.

Clairmont would later say that her relationship with Byron had given her only a few minutes of pleasure, but a lifetime of trouble.

=== Allegra ===
The group left Byron in Switzerland at the end of the summer and returned to England. Clairmont took up residence in Bath and in January 1817 she gave birth to a daughter, Alba, whose name was eventually changed to Allegra. Throughout the pregnancy, Clairmont had written long letters to Byron, pleading for his attention and a promise to care for her and the baby, sometimes making fun of his friends, reminding him how much he had enjoyed having sex with her, and sometimes threatening suicide. Byron, who by this time hated her, ignored the letters. The following year, Clairmont and the Shelleys left England and journeyed once more to Byron, who now resided in Italy. Clairmont felt that the future Byron could provide for their daughter would be greater than any she herself would be able to grant the child and therefore, wished to deliver Allegra into his care.

Upon arriving in Italy, Clairmont was again refused by Byron. He arranged to have Allegra delivered to his house in Venice and agreed to raise the child on the condition that Clairmont keep her distance from him. Clairmont reluctantly gave Allegra over to Byron.

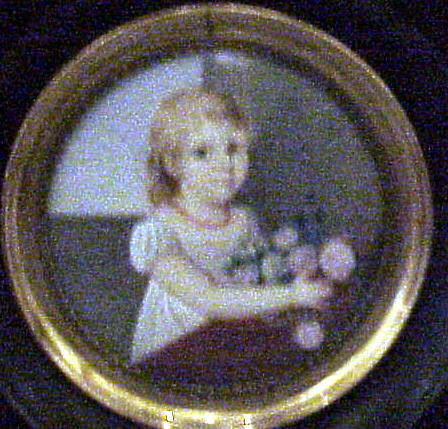
Clara Allegra Byron, about 1822

Clairmont was granted only a few brief visits with her daughter after surrendering her to Byron. When Byron arranged to place her in a Capuchin convent in Bagnacavallo, Italy, Clairmont was outraged. In 1821, she wrote Byron a letter accusing him of breaking his promise that their daughter would never be apart from one of her parents. She felt that the physical conditions in convents were unhealthy and the education provided was poor and was responsible for "the state of ignorance & profligacy of Italian women, all pupils of Convents. They are bad wives & most unnatural mothers, licentious & ignorant they are the dishonour & unhappiness of society.... This step will procure to you an innumerable addition of enemies & of blame."

By March 1822, it had been two years since she had seen her daughter. She plotted to kidnap Allegra from the convent and asked Shelley to forge a letter of permission from Byron. Shelley refused her request. Byron's seemingly callous treatment of the child was further vilified when Allegra died there at the age of five, from a fever some scholars identify as typhus and others speculate was a malarial-type fever. Clairmont held Byron entirely responsible for the loss of their daughter and hated him for the rest of her life. Shelley's death followed only two months later.

=== Relationship with Percy Bysshe Shelley ===
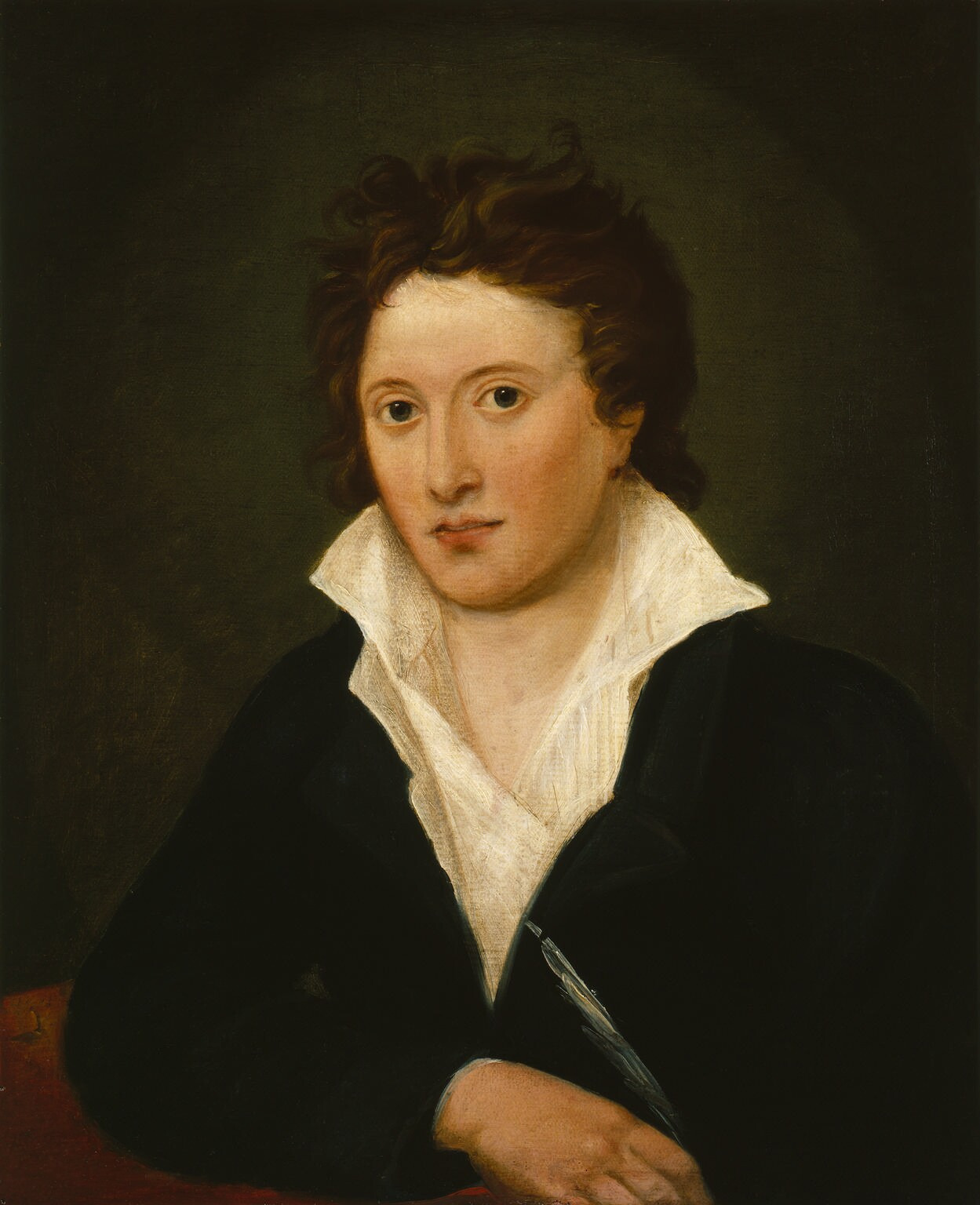
Percy Bysshe Shelley in 1819

Clairmont may have been sexually involved with Percy Bysshe Shelley at various periods, though Clairmont's biographers, Robert Gittings and Jo Manton, find no hard evidence. Their friend Thomas Jefferson Hogg joked about "Shelley and his two wives", Mary and Claire, a remark that Clairmont recorded in her own journal. Clairmont was also entirely in sympathy, more so than Mary, with Shelley's theories about free love, communal living, and the right of a woman to choose her own lovers and initiate sexual contact outside marriage. She seemed to conceive of love as a "triangle" and enjoyed being the third. She had also formed a close friendship with Shelley, who called her "my sweet child", and she both inspired and fed off his work.

Mary Shelley's early journals record several times when Clairmont and Shelley shared visions of Gothic horror and let their imaginings take flight, stirring each other's emotions to the point of hysteria and nightmares. In October 1814, Shelley deliberately frightened Clairmont by assuming a particularly sinister and horrifying facial expression. "How horribly you look... Take your eyes off!" she cried. She was put to bed after yet another of her "horrors". Shelley described her expression to Mary as "distorted most unnaturally by horrible dismay". In the autumn of 1814, Clairmont and Shelley also discussed forming "an association of philosophical people" and Clairmont's conception of an idealized community in which women were the ones in charge.

Shelley's poem "To Constantia, Singing" is thought to be about her:

Constantia turn!

In thy dark eyes a power like light doth lie
Even though the sounds which were thy voice, which burn
Between thy lips, are laid to sleep:
Within thy breath, and on thy hair
Like odour, it is yet,
And from thy touch like fire doth leap.
Even while I write, my burning cheeks are wet

Alas, that the torn heart can bleed, but not forget!

Mary Shelley revised this poem, completely altering the first two stanzas, when she included it in a posthumous collection of Shelley's works published in 1824. In Shelley's "Epipsychidion", some scholars believe that he is addressing Clairmont as his:

Comet beautiful and fierce

Who drew the heart of this frail Universe
Towards thine own; till, wrecked in that convulsion
Alternating attraction and repulsion

Thine went astray and that was rent in twain.

At the time Shelley wrote the poem, in Pisa, Clairmont was living in Florence, and the lines may reveal how much he missed her.

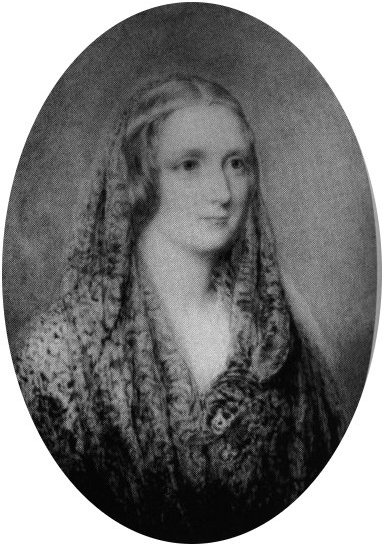
Mary Shelley, about 1820

It has occasionally been suggested that Clairmont was also the mother of a daughter fathered by Percy Shelley. The possibility goes back to the accusation by Shelley's servants, Elise and Paolo Foggi, that Clairmont gave birth to Shelley's baby during a stay in Naples, where on 27 February 1819, Shelley registered a baby named Elena Adelaide Shelley as having been born on 27 December 1818. The registrar recorded her as the daughter of Percy Shelley and "Maria" or "Marina Padurin" (possibly an Italian mispronunciation of "Mary Godwin"), and she was baptized the same day as the lawfully begotten child of Percy Shelley and Mary Godwin. It is, however, almost impossible that Mary Shelley was the mother, and this has given rise to several theories, including that the child was indeed Clairmont's. Clairmont herself had ascended Mount Vesuvius, carried on a palanquin, on 16 December 1818, only nine days before the date given for the birth of Elena. It may be significant, however, that Clairmont was taken ill at about the same time – according to Mary Shelley's journal she was ill on 27 December – and that her journal of June 1818 to early March 1819 has been lost. In a letter to Isabella Hoppner of 10 August 1821, Mary Shelley, however, stated emphatically that "Claire had no child". She also insisted:

I am perfectly convinced in my own mind that Shelley never had an improper connexion with Claire... we lived in lodgings where I had momentary entrance into every room and such a thing could not have passed unknown to me... I do remember that Claire did keep to her bed there for two days – but I attended on her – I saw the physician – her illness was one that she had been accustomed to for years – and the same remedies were employed as I had before ministered to her in England.

The infant Elena was placed with foster parents and later died on 10 June 1820. Byron believed the rumours about Elena and used them as one more reason not to let Clairmont influence Allegra.

== Later life ==
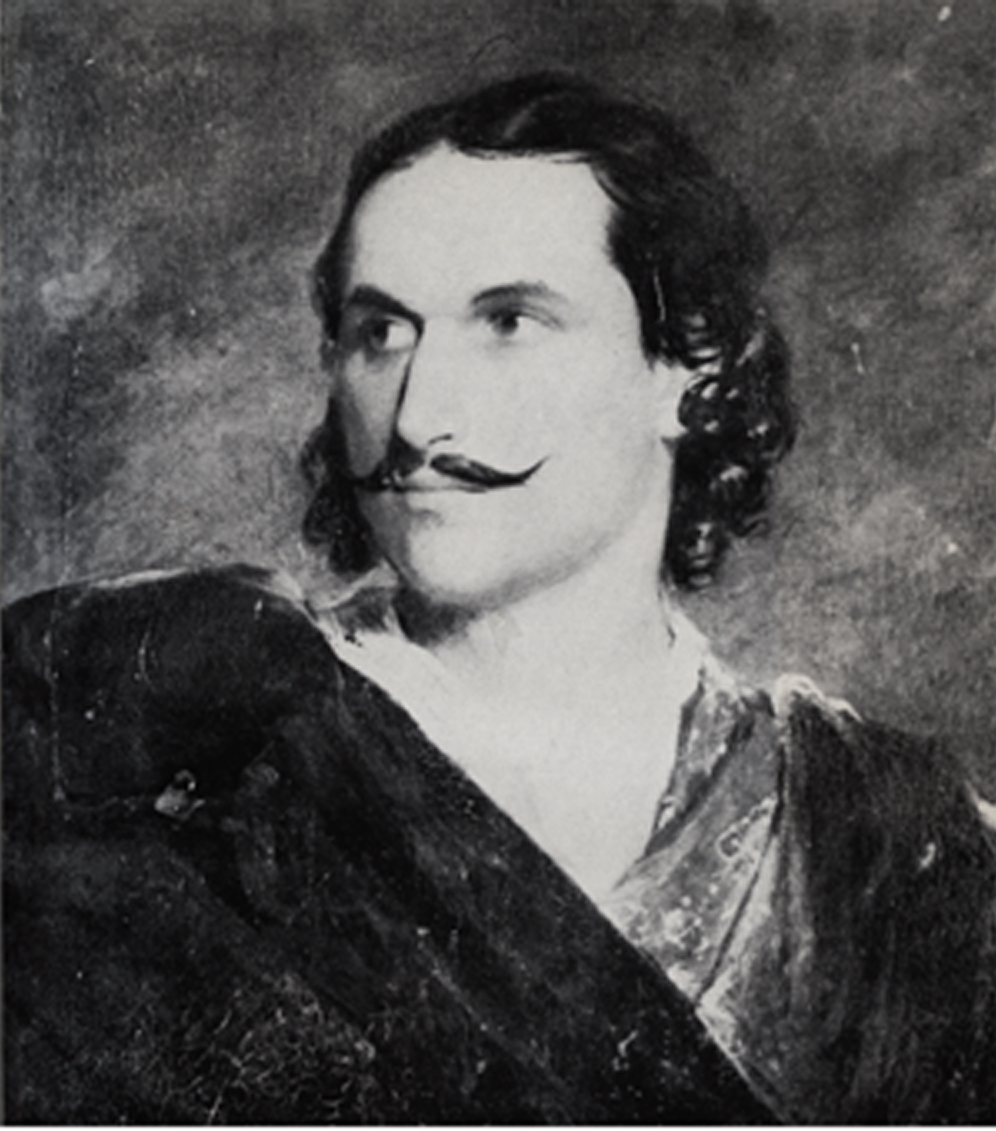
Edward John Trelawny

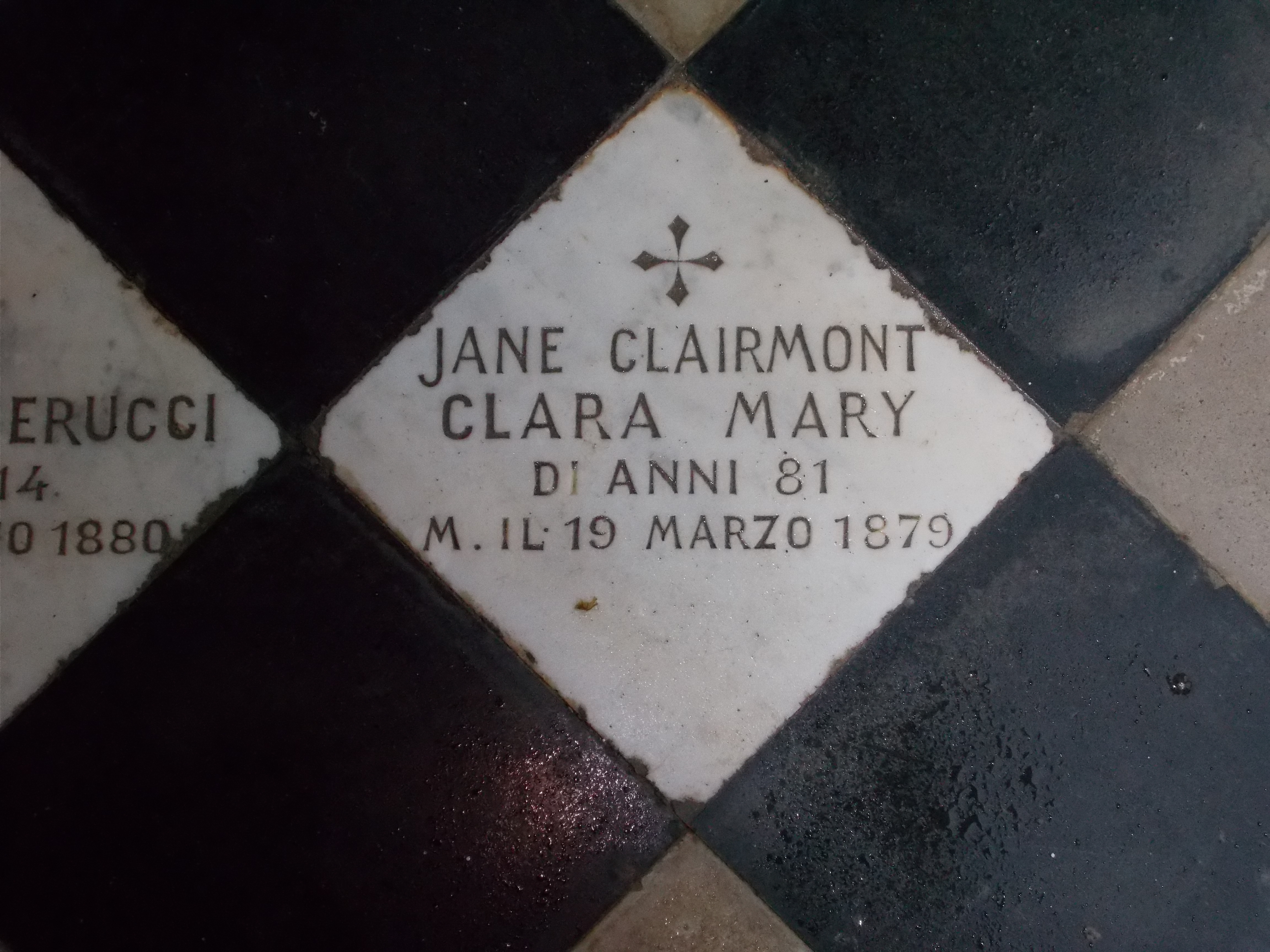
Tomb of Claire Clairmont at Cimitero della Misericordia dell'Antella, Florence, Italy

Shortly after Clairmont had introduced Shelley to Byron, she met Edward John Trelawny, who was to play a major role in the short remaining lives of both poets. After Shelley's death, Trelawny sent her love letters from Florence pleading with her to marry him, but she was not interested. Still, she remained in contact with him the rest of her long life. Clairmont wrote to Mary Shelley: "He [Trelawny] likes a turbid and troubled life; I a quiet one; he is full of fine feeling and has no principles; I am full of fine principles but never had a feeling (in my life)."

=== Governess in Russia ===
Devastated after Shelley's death, Mary returned to England. She paid for Clairmont to travel to her brother's home in Vienna where she stayed for a year, before relocating to Russia, where she worked as a governess from 1825 to 1828, firstly in St Petersburg and then in Moscow. During her time in Russia, she witnessed the Decembrist revolt. The people she worked for treated her almost as a member of the family. Still, what Clairmont longed for most of all was privacy and peace and quiet, as she complained in letters to Mary Shelley.

Two Russian men she met commented on her general disdain for the male sex; irritated by their assumption that since she was always falling in love, she would return their affections if they flirted with her, Clairmont joked in a letter to Mary Shelley that perhaps she should fall in love with both of them at once and prove them wrong.

=== Dresden ===
She returned to England in 1828, but remained there only a short while before departing for Dresden, where she was employed as a companion and housekeeper. Scholar Bradford A. Booth suggested in 1938 that Clairmont, driven by a need for money, might have been the true author of most of The Pole, an 1830 short story that appeared in the magazine The Court Assembly and Belle Assemblée as by "The Author of Frankenstein". Unlike Mary Shelley, Clairmont was familiar with the Polish used in the story. At one point, she thought of writing a book about the dangers that might result from "erroneous opinions" about the relations between men and women, using examples from the lives of Shelley and Byron. She did not make many literary attempts, as she explained to her friend Jane Williams:

But in our family, if you cannot write an epic or novel, that by its originality knocks all other novels on the head, you are a despicable creature, not worth acknowledging.

=== Return to England ===
In 1836, the year William Godwin died, Clairmont returned to England, where she worked as a music teacher. She cared for her mother when she was dying. In 1841, after Mary Jane Godwin's death, Clairmont moved to Pisa, where she lived with Margaret King (officially Lady Margaret Mount Cashell but known as Mrs Mason), an old pupil of Mary Wollstonecraft. She lived in Paris for a time in the 1840s, where she attended Harriet de Boinville's social gatherings, crowded with republicans and Italian revolutionaries. In one letter to her stepsister, Mary, she wrote:

"At Madame de Boinville's the people are clever and I go there and I like the conversation, but I am never allowed to speak myself... after fifteen years being silent, I want to talk a good deal... to clear out my mind of all the ideas that have been accumulating and literally rotting there for so many years – but they won't allow me this in Rue Clichy – the instant I speak, the whole coterie fall upon my words and pick them to pieces... seize upon my argument (so dear to me)... they are liberals of such opposite characters... I beg it to be understood that I am the most liberal, I am proud to say, not one of them can keep pace with me in liberality – I leave them all five hundred miles behind me."

Percy Shelley had left her £12,000 in his will, which she finally received in 1844. She carried on a sometimes turbulent, bitter correspondence with her stepsister, until Mary died in 1851.

=== Florence and death ===
Clairmont converted to Catholicism, despite having hated the religion earlier in her life. She moved to Florence in 1870 and lived there in an expatriate colony with her niece, Paulina. She was also close to Paulina's brother Wilhelm Gaulis Clairmont, the only other surviving child of her brother Charles. She considered making her home with him and financially supported some of his endeavours, for example with £500 towards the purchase of a farm.

Clairmont also clung to memorabilia of Percy Shelley. The Aspern Papers by Henry James is inspired by the true story of a retired captain, Edward Silsbee, who tried to purchase the letters that Shelley had written to Clairmont, and which she saved until her death. Clairmont died in Florence on 19 March 1879, at the age of 80 having outlived all the members of Shelley's circle except Trelawny and Jane Williams.

== Reputation and legacy ==
Writing for the Wordsworth Trust in 2014, author Lesley McDowell described Clairmont as "the ideal Romantic woman, as conjured up by Mary Wollstonecraft herself in A Vindication of the Rights of Woman", adding that "rarely did any other Romantic figure “mix in the throng” and attain knowledge of herself through others, to the extent that Claire Clairmont did."

== In popular culture ==
=== Film ===
The 1816 trip to Switzerland during the Year Without a Summer, during which Clairmont aimed to reunite with Byron, and Mary Shelley began writing Frankenstein, is the focus of multiple modern re-tellings in several mediums. She was portrayed by Myriam Cyr in the 1986 Ken Russell film Gothic, by Elizabeth Hurley in the Goya Award-winning 1988 Spanish film Rowing with the Wind, and by Laura Dern in Haunted Summer (1988).

Thirty years later, Clairmont was played by Bel Powley in Mary Shelley (2017) and by Nadia Parkes in the 2020 Doctor Who episode "The Haunting of Villa Diodati".

=== Literature ===
Clairmont was depicted in a special edition of the comic book The Wicked + The Divine, as an incarnation of the goddess Inanna and a member of the 1830s Pantheon.

She is also referred to in a disparaging manner by Jonathan Strange in the novel Jonathan Strange & Mr Norrell while he is describing his relationship with Lord Byron in letters home.

Claire is a featured character in the historical fiction novel Our Hands are Pale as Milk by Sara Kay Rupnik published by Serving House Books in 2025.

An 18-year-old Clairmont is the subject of the 2026 historical fiction novel Love & Other Monsters by Emily Franklin.

== See also ==
- Godwin–Shelley family tree

== Bibliography ==
- James Bieri. Percy Bysshe Shelley, a Biography: Exile of Unfulfilled Renown, 1816–1822. Newark: University of Delaware Press, 2005. ISBN 0-87413-893-0.
- Bradford A. Booth. "The Pole: A Story by Claire Clairmont?" In ELH, Vol. 5, No. 1 (March 1938), pp. 67–70. Retrieved 8 April 2008.
- Deirdre Coleman. "Claire Clairmont and Mary Shelley: identification and rivalry within the 'tribe of the Otaheite philosopher's'." 2006. Retrieved 8 April 2008.
- Benita Eisler. Byron: Child of Passion, Fool of Fame. New York: Alfred A. Knopf, 1999. ISBN 0-679-41299-9.
- Audrey A. Fisch, Anne Kostelanetz Mellor, and Esther H. Schor. The Other Mary Shelley: Beyond Frankenstein. Oxford: Oxford University Press, 1993. ISBN 0-19-507740-7.
- Garnett, Richard (1887). "Clairmont, Clara Mary Jane" . In Stephen, Leslie (ed.). Dictionary of National Biography. Vol. 10. London: Smith, Elder & Co.
- Robert Gittings and Jo Manton. Claire Clairmont and the Shelleys. Oxford: Oxford University Press, 1992. ISBN 0-19-818594-4.
- Rosalie Glynn Grylls. Claire Clairmont, Mother of Byron's Allegra. London: John Murray, 1939. OCLC 186940021.
- Armistead C. Gordon. Allegra: The Story of Byron and Miss Clairmont. New York: Minton, Balch & Company, 1926. OCLC 1515933.
- Richard Holmes. Shelley: The Pursuit. 1974. London: Harper Perennial, 2003. ISBN 0-00-720458-2.
- Lisa Diane Leslie. 'How can I exist apart from my sister?': Sisters in the Life and Literature of Percy Bysshe Shelley, Mary Shelley, and Claire Clairmont. PhD Thesis. Liverpool: University of Liverpool, 2001. British Library, DX241303. OCLC 59496278.
- Iain McCalman, Jon Mee, Gillian Russell, and Clara Tuite, eds. An Oxford Companion to the Romantic Age: British Culture, 1776–1832. Oxford: Oxford University Press, 1999. ISBN 0-19-924543-6.
- Lesley McDowell. "Books: Women's Work". A review of Other People's Daughters: The Life and Times of the Governess, by Ruth Brandon. The Scotsman, 29 March 2008. Retrieved 7 April 2008.
- Miranda Seymour. Mary Shelley. London: John Murray, 2000. ISBN 0-7195-5711-9.
- Mary Shelley. The Journals of Mary Shelley, 1814–44. Edited by Paula R. Feldman and Diana Scott-Kilvert. Baltimore: Johns Hopkins University Press, 1995. ISBN 0-8018-5088-6.
- Mary Shelley. Selected Letters of Mary Wollstonecraft Shelley. Edited by Betty T. Bennett. Baltimore: Johns Hopkins University Press, 1995. ISBN 0-8018-4886-5.
- William St Clair. The Godwins and the Shelleys: The Biography of a Family. London: Faber & Faber, 1989. ISBN 0-571-15422-0.
- Marion Kingston Stocking: "Clairmont, Clara Mary Jane (1798–1979" (Oxford, UK: Oxford University Press, 2004). Retrieved 27 July 2018.
- Marion Kingston Stocking, ed. The Clairmont Correspondence: Letters of Claire Clairmont, Charles Clairmont, and Fanny Imlay Godwin. 2 vols. Baltimore: Johns Hopkins University Press, 1995. ISBN 0-8018-4633-1.
- Marion Kingston Stocking, ed. "The Journals of Claire Clairmont 1814–1827." Cambridge: Harvard University Press, 1968.
- Janet Todd. Death & The Maidens. Berkeley, CA: Counterpoint, 2007. ISBN 1-58243-339-9.
- Laura Whalen. "The Song of Claire". Create Space, 2018. ISBN 9781987767414
