= Sir John Lethbridge, 1st Baronet =

Politician; Sheriff of Somerset (1746–1815)

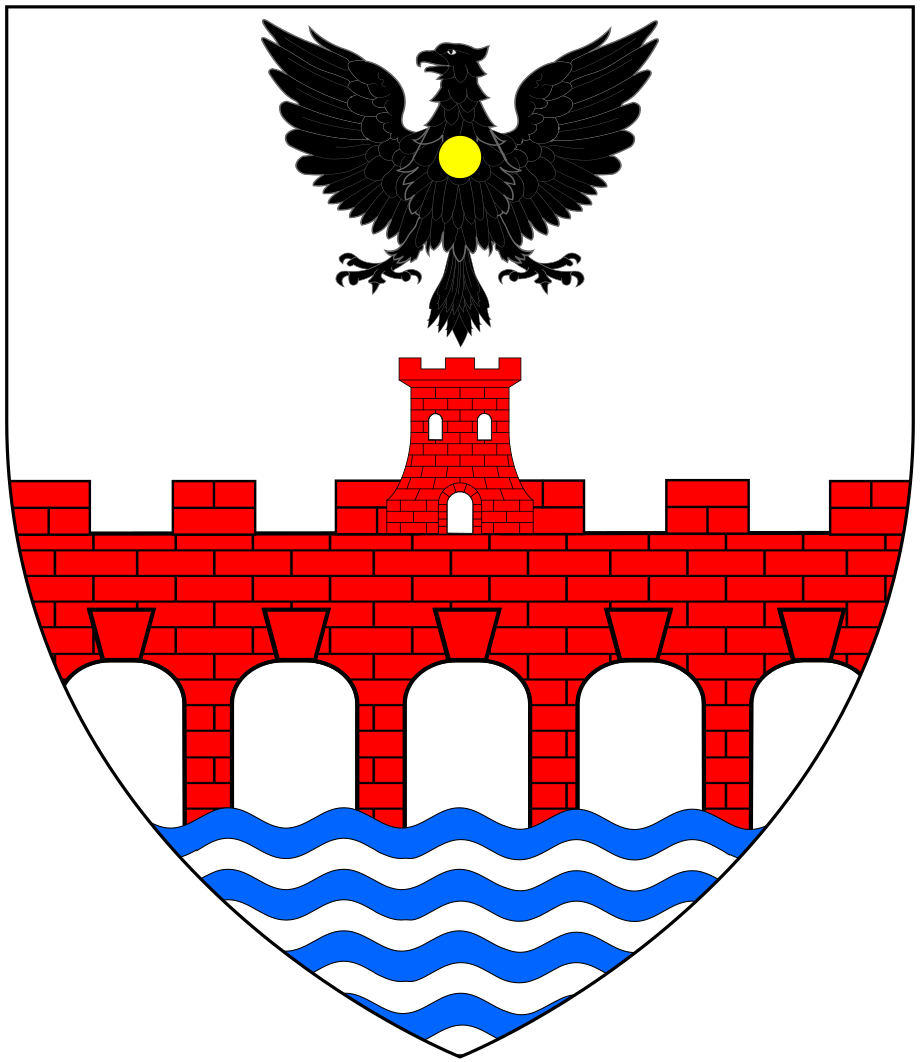
- Canting arms of Lethbridge: Argent, over water proper, a bridge of five arches embattled gules and over the centre arch a turret in chief an eagle displayed sable charged on the breast with a bezant

Sheriff of Somerset
- In office 1788–1789
- Preceded by: Nathaniel Dalton
- Succeeded by: Henry Hippisley Coxe

Member of Parliament for Minehead
- In office 1806–1807 Serving with George Parkyns
- Preceded by: John Fownes Luttrell
- Succeeded by: John Fownes Luttrell

Personal details
- Born: 12 March 1746
- Died: 15 December 1815 (aged 69)
- Party: Tory
- Spouse: Dorothea Buckler (m. 1776)
- Children: 4, including; Sir Thomas Lethbridge, 2nd Baronet; Claire Clairmont
- Relatives: Allegra Byron (granddaughter)

Sir John Lethbridge, 1st Baronet (12 March 1746 – 15 December 1815), of Whitehall Place, Westminster; Sandhill Park, Somerset; Westaway in the parish of Pilton, Devon, and Winkleigh Court, Winkleigh, Devon, was Member of Parliament for Minehead in Somerset from 1806 to 1807. He served as Sheriff of Somerset in 1788–9. In 2010 it was discovered that Lethbridge had been the biological father of Claire Clairmont, and thus the grandfather of Clairmont's daughter with Lord Byron, Allegra.

== Origins ==
Lethbridge was born on 12 March 1746, the only son of John Lethbridge (died 1761) of Westaway House in the parish of Pilton, North Devon, by his wife Grace Cardor (alias Carder), daughter of Amos Cardor of Westdown House in Devon. John Lethbridge was the only surviving son of Thomas Lethbridge (1698–1734), Gentleman, a lawyer of Clement's Inn, by his wife Sarah Periam, daughter of John Periam (died 1711) of Milverton, Somerset, and sister of John Periam (c. 1701 – 1788) of Milverton, MP for Minehead (1742–7). John Periam in 1720 built a mansion at Sandhill Park in the parish of Bishops Lydeard, Somerset, which descended to the Lethbridge family. Periam was descended from Sir William Peryam (1534–1604) of Little Fulford, near Crediton in Devon, Lord Chief Baron of the Exchequer under Queen Elizabeth I. Thomas had another son Thomas Lethbridge (1724–1744), Gentleman, who died aged 20 and was buried in the Bowchier vault in Pilton Church. Thomas Lethbridge was a younger son of Christopher Lethbridge, Esquire, of Westaway, by his wife Margaret Bowchier (whom he married on 3 January 1681/2), daughter and heiress of Phillip Bowchier (1623–1687) of Westaway. Christopher's uncle was Christopher Lethbridge (died 1670) of Exeter in Devon, Mayor of Exeter in 1660, and one of the Worthies of Devon of the biographer John Prince, (1643–1723). Mayor Christopher Lethbridge appears to have been the ultimate source of the great wealth of the Lethbridge family of Sandhill Park.

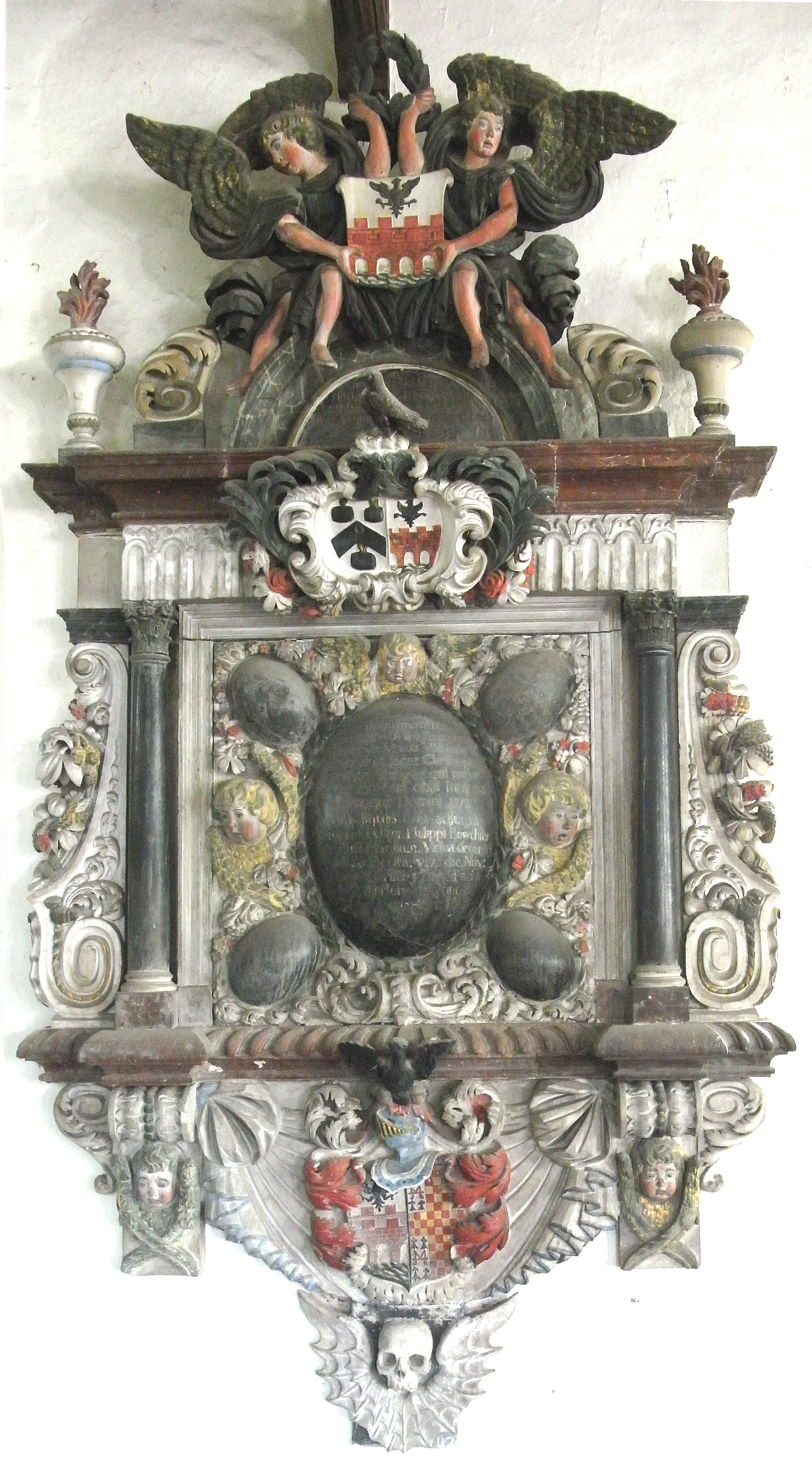
Mural monument to Christopher Lethbridge (died 1713) of Westaway, south aisle wall of Pilton Church, Devon, displaying arms of Lethbridge, Bowchier of Westaway and Incledon of Pilton House

The connection to the Bowchiers of Westaway provided the basis for a Lethbridge claim of heirship to the Barons FitzWarin, which had fallen into abeyance in 1636 with the death of Edward Bourchier, 4th Earl of Bath, though there is no documented connection between him and the Bowchiers. In 1786 John Lethbridge, the future 1st Baronet, made a generous gift of several thousand pounds to the Prince Regent "to relieve the Prince of Wales, out of concern for the dignity of the Royal family and the country and with no ulterior motive." However, it seems this gift was later used as a reason for the king to compensate the 1st Baronet by the grant of the title "Baron FitzWarin", alias "Fitzwarren". In 1809 he made an application to the king for the barony, and in 1811 his son wrote to the Prime Minister that this had been desired by his father "for many years", "as a mark of royal favour". A third application was made in 1812, but all without result.

A Ledger stone survives in St Mary's Church, Pilton, to Phillip Bowchier (1623–1687) of Westaway, inscribed as follows:

"Here lyeth ye body of Phillip Bowchier, Gent., buried ye 3^{d} day of Agust 1687 aged 64 years. Here also layeth the body of Agnes late wife of Phillip Bowchier, Gent., who departed this life ye 25th day of No^{br} 1698 aged 66. Here lyes also buryed the body of Thomas Lethbridge, Gent., son of Thomas Lethbridge of Clement's Inne, Gent., a younger son of Christopher Lethbridge of Westaway, Esq., by Margaret his wife daughter of the above named Philip Bowchier. Ob^{t} 10th Aug^{st} 1744 aetatis 20"

== Career ==
Lethbridge was educated at Winchester College and matriculated at Magdalen College, Oxford in 1764. He served as Sheriff of Somerset in 1788-9 and as a captain in the Somerset Fencibles in 1794, raised to meet the threat of French invasion. He was created a baronet in 1804, "of Westaway House in Devon and Winkley Court in the County of Somerset". He served as Member of Parliament for Minehead in Somerset from 1806 to 1807, apparently due to the influence over that seat exerted by his friend John Fownes Luttrell (1752–1816), feudal barony of Dunster of nearby Dunster Castle, who "having incurred liability for a treating offence [a form of electoral fraud] and to avoid risking a petition, returned Lethbridge as locum tenens until the danger of a petition was past".

The Tate holds a 1785 portrait entitled The Lethbridge Children, presumably commissioned by him. The accompanying description states that he was a governor of the British Mineral Water Hospital in the 1770s and 80s (now the Royal National Hospital for Rheumatic Diseases).

== Character ==
He was described (under the name of "Sir Richard Lethmore") by Lady Spencer, wife of the prime minister Spencer Perceval, as "a most abominable profligate—a rustic roué, very rich and using his riches for the worst purposes".

== Landholdings ==
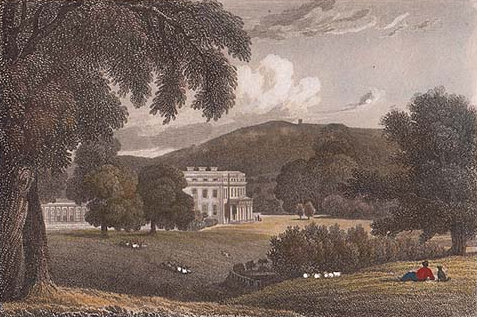
"Sandhill Park, Somersetshire", 1829 engraving

- Sandhill Park the estate of which lies partly in the parishes of Bishops Lydeard and Ash Priors, Somerset, built in 1720 by his grandfather's father-in-law John Periam (or possibly by the latter's son John Periam, MP for Minehead) who called it "Hill House". The subject of this article came to Sandhill in 1767, aged about 21, and it was in all probability at that time that the house was enlarged and the walls hung with pictures, including valuable examples by Salvator Rosa, Poussin, Guido Reni, Vandervelt, Snyders, Sir Joshua Reynolds and Gainsborough, and at the same time the library received its large collection of ancient books. The 1st Baronet spent lavishly on "adorning his place and mansion", as was reported by Lady Spencer, who related the following story (in which she refers to him as Sir Richard):

"He has a near neighbour who is at daggers drawn with him and has completely got the better of (him) in the art of tormenting, by imitating instantly every improvement Sir Richard is making at his seat, in his own, which kills with spleen the unhappy man of taste, for these imitations are very ill-executed. Sir Richard bethought himself however, lately, of a scheme which he conceived entirely out of the reach of his persecutor, namely a large and magnificent piece of water which he knew from the nature of the place his neighbour possessed, could not be equalled by him. However, here again he was mistaken, for the tormentor immediately made a frightful piece of water and placed in the very centre of it a large horrid statue holding a label out of its hand on which is written 'The way to Harlots Hall'. Did you ever hear such thorough-paced country gentlemen’s raillerie?".

- Hammett's estate, Somerset. In 1811 he bought the estate of Sir Benjamin Hammet (died 1800) at Taunton, Somerset. Hammet was a banker, MP for Taunton 1782-1800 and Sheriff of the City of London.
- Westaway, Pilton, Devon, sold by his son in 1819 to James Whyte of Pilton House.
- Winkleigh Court, also known as "Court Barton", in the parish of Winkleigh, Devon. This manor was an important one in the county, being the caput of the Devonshire holdings of the feudal barony of Gloucester. It was at some time split into two moieties (Winkleigh Keynes and Winkleigh Tracey), but by 1822, when Lysons published his Magna Britannia, both belonged to Sir Thomas Buckler Lethbridge, 2nd Baronet (1778–1849). The Lethbridge family seat was near the church, but shortly before 1822 had been sold to Rev. John Tossell Johnson.

== Marriage and children ==
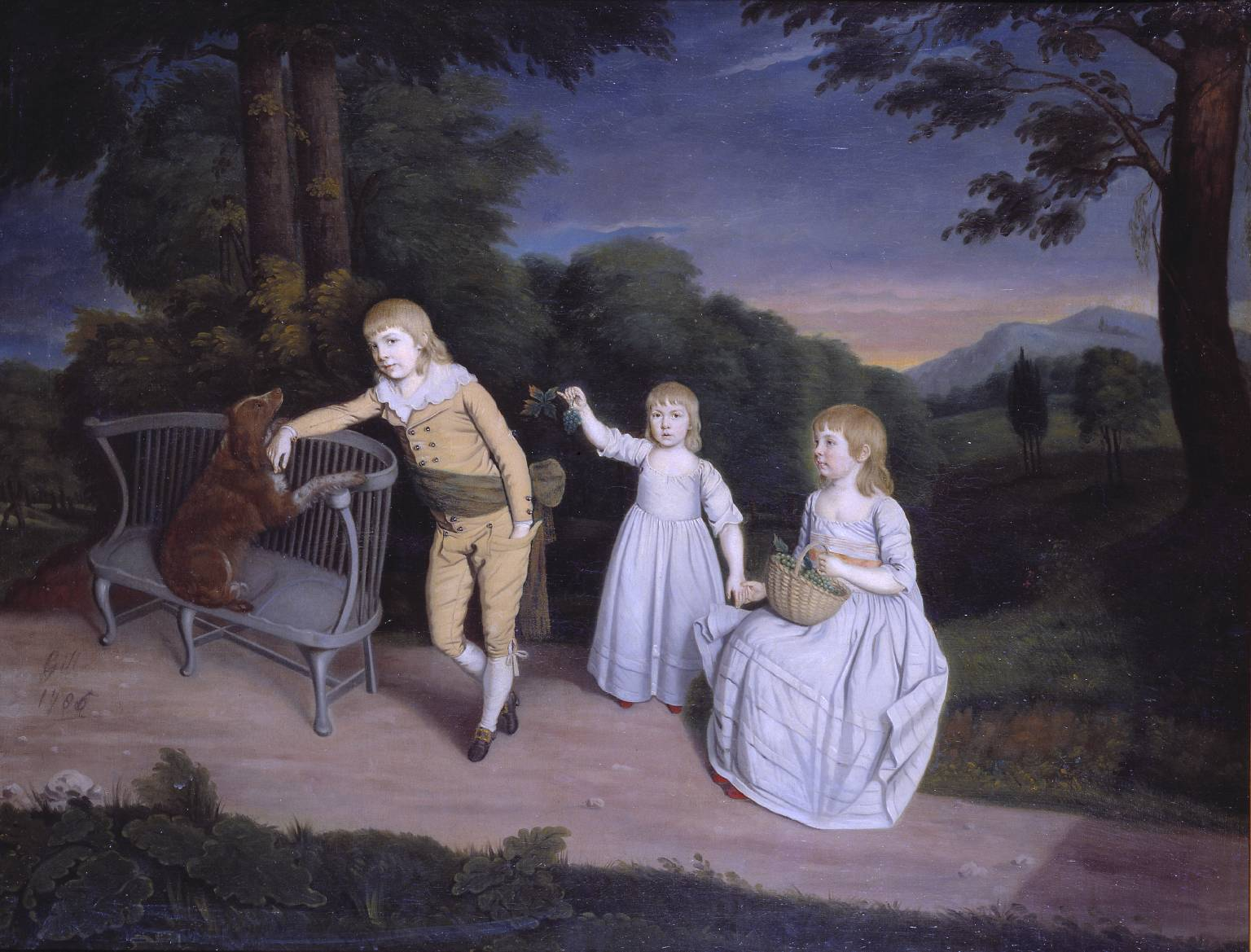
The children are (l-r) Sir Thomas Buckler Lethbridge, 2nd Baronet (b.1778), Dorothea and Frances Maria (by Charles Gill).

In June 1776 he married Dorothea Buckler, a daughter and co-heiress of William Buckler of Boreham in Wiltshire, by whom he had one son and two daughters as follows.

- Sir Thomas Buckler Lethbridge, 2nd Baronet (1778–1849), son and heir, several times MP for Somerset, who married Anne Goddard.
- Dorothea Lethbridge, wife of Henry Powell Collins (1776–1854), of Hatch Court, Hatch Beauchamp, Somerset, twice MP for Taunton (1811–1818, 1819–1820) and Sheriff of Somerset in 1827.
- Frances-Maria Lethbridge, wife of Sir Charles Henry Rich, 2nd Baronet (1784–1857) of Shirley House, Southampton.

In 2010 Lethbridge was discovered to be the father of Claire Clairmont. It appears that Lethbridge had an affair with Mary Jane Vial Clairmont, who gave birth to a daughter on 27 April 1798 in Brislington, near Bristol. Births outside marriage then carried great stigma for the mother and child. Correspondence, including lawyers' letters, show that, after some pressure, he acknowledged paternity and made a financial settlement. Nonetheless, the child did not bear his name: the mother identified him as a "Charles Clairmont", adopting the name Clairmont for herself and both her children, to disguise their illegitimacy. A few years later, she married the writer and philosopher William Godwin, so Lethbridge's daughter grew up in a literary household with a blended family, including Godwin's stepdaughter (Fanny Imlay) and daughter by his late wife Mary Wollstonecraft. When the younger of these, Mary, eloped with the poet Percy Bysshe Shelley, Claire Clairmont accompanied them on their flight to Europe. Clairmont had a brief relationship with Lord Byron, and they had a daughter together. Thus Lethbridge was the grandfather of Allegra Byron.

== Death ==
He died on 15 December 1815. On his deathbed he tore up a will by which he had disinherited his son. His monument in Bishops Lydeard Church is inscribed as follows:

"Underneath are deposited the relics of Sir John Lethbridge, Bart., who departed this life 15 Dec, 1815, in his 70th year. He had lived at Sandhill Park in this Parish for the last 48 years, but was formerly of Westaway House, in the county of Devon, where, and at Winkley Court, in the same county, his ancestors had been for many generations situated. This stone is also sacred to the memory of Dame Dorothy Lethbridge, relict of Sir John Lethbridge, Bart, and elder daughter and co-heiress of the late William Buckler, of Boreham, in the county of Wilts. She lived a pattern of Christian piety and virtue, and died full of good works Dec. 1st 1831, aged 82 years".

== Sources ==
- Thorne, R.G., biography of "Lethbridge, Sir John, 1st Bt. (1746–1815), of Sandhill Park, Taunton, Som.", published in History of Parliament: House of Commons 1790-1820, ed. R. Thorne, 1986.LETHBRIDGE, Sir John, 1st Bt. (1746-1815), of Sandhill Park, Taunton, Som. | History of Parliament Online
- Burke, John, General and Heraldic Dictionary of the Peerage and Baronetage of the British Empire, 3rd Edition, London, 1830, pp. 463–4 Burke's Genealogical and Heraldic History of Peerage, Baronetage and Knightage
- Baynham, Rev. Arthur Wilfrid, Memorials of Ash Priors, Exeter, 1908, pp. 125 et seq, "Lethbridge Family"Memorials of Ash Priors

Baronetage of the United Kingdom
New creation	Baronet (of Westaway House and Winkley Court); 1804–1815	Succeeded by Thomas Lethbridge
