= Mary Jane Godwin =

English author, publisher, and bookseller (1768–1841)

- Born: Mary Jane de Vial; 1768; Exeter, Devon, England
- Died: 17 June 1841 (aged 72–73); London, England
- Other name: Mary Jane Clairmont
- Occupations: Author, publisher, bookseller
- Spouse: William Godwin (m. 1801; died 1836)
- Children: 3; including Claire and William
- Relatives: Fanny Imlay (stepdaughter); Mary Shelley (stepdaughter); Allegra Byron (granddaughter)

Mary Jane Godwin (née de Vial; pseudonymed Mary Jane Clairmont; 1768 – 17 June 1841) was an English author, publisher, and bookseller. She was the second wife of William Godwin and stepmother to Mary Shelley.

== Early life ==
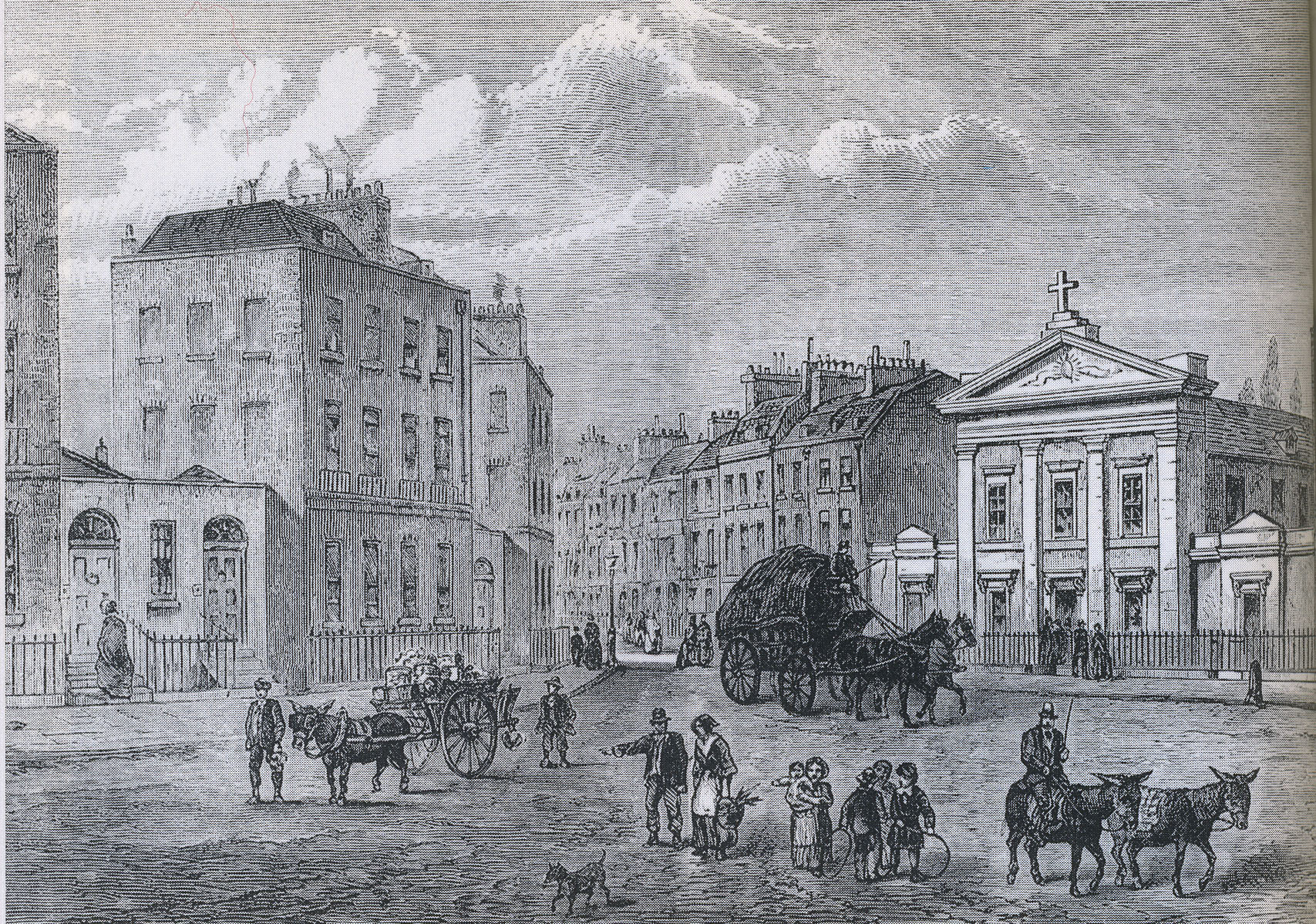
The Polygon (at left) in Somers Town, London, between Camden Town and St Pancras, where Mary Jane Clairmont and William Godwin were neighbours.

Mary Jane de Vial was born in Exeter in 1768, probably the daughter of merchant Peter de Vial and his wife Mary (née Tremlett). Little is known about her early life, but she spoke several European languages and claimed to have travelled extensively on the Continent.

In 1795, she was living in Bristol, a busy port city in south west England. There she bore her first child, Charles. Three years later at Brislington, a nearby village, she gave birth to a daughter she named Clara (in childhood known as Jane and in adulthood as Claire). To avoid these children bearing the social stigma of illegitimacy, she passed herself off as the widow of Charles Abram Marc Gaulis, "a merchant and member of a prominent Swiss family, whom she met in Cádiz". (His sister Albertina Mariana married Robert Trefusis, 17th Baron Clinton; both baron and baroness died in 1797-98.) She said that the Swiss merchant had anglicised his name upon settling in England, and so she and her children used the surname Clairmont. It appears that he was indeed the father of her first child, Charles Gaulis Clairmont, but there is no evidence that they ever married. In 2010, the father of her second child was discovered to be John Lethbridge (1746–1815, after 1804 Sir John Lethbridge, 1st Baronet) of Sandhill Park, near Taunton in Somerset. This discovery came through a trove of lawyers' letters, showing her making her case for child support payments. In 1799 and 1800 she was in debtors' prison in Ilchester.

By 1801, calling herself Mrs Clairmont, she was living in Somers Town, an area of London between St Pancras and Camden Town. Her neighbour at The Polygon, an early housing estate, was the philosopher and writer William Godwin, whose first wife Mary Wollstonecraft had died shortly after childbirth four years previously. He, like her, had two children to care for: Fanny Imlay and the young Mary Shelley.

== Marriage to William Godwin ==
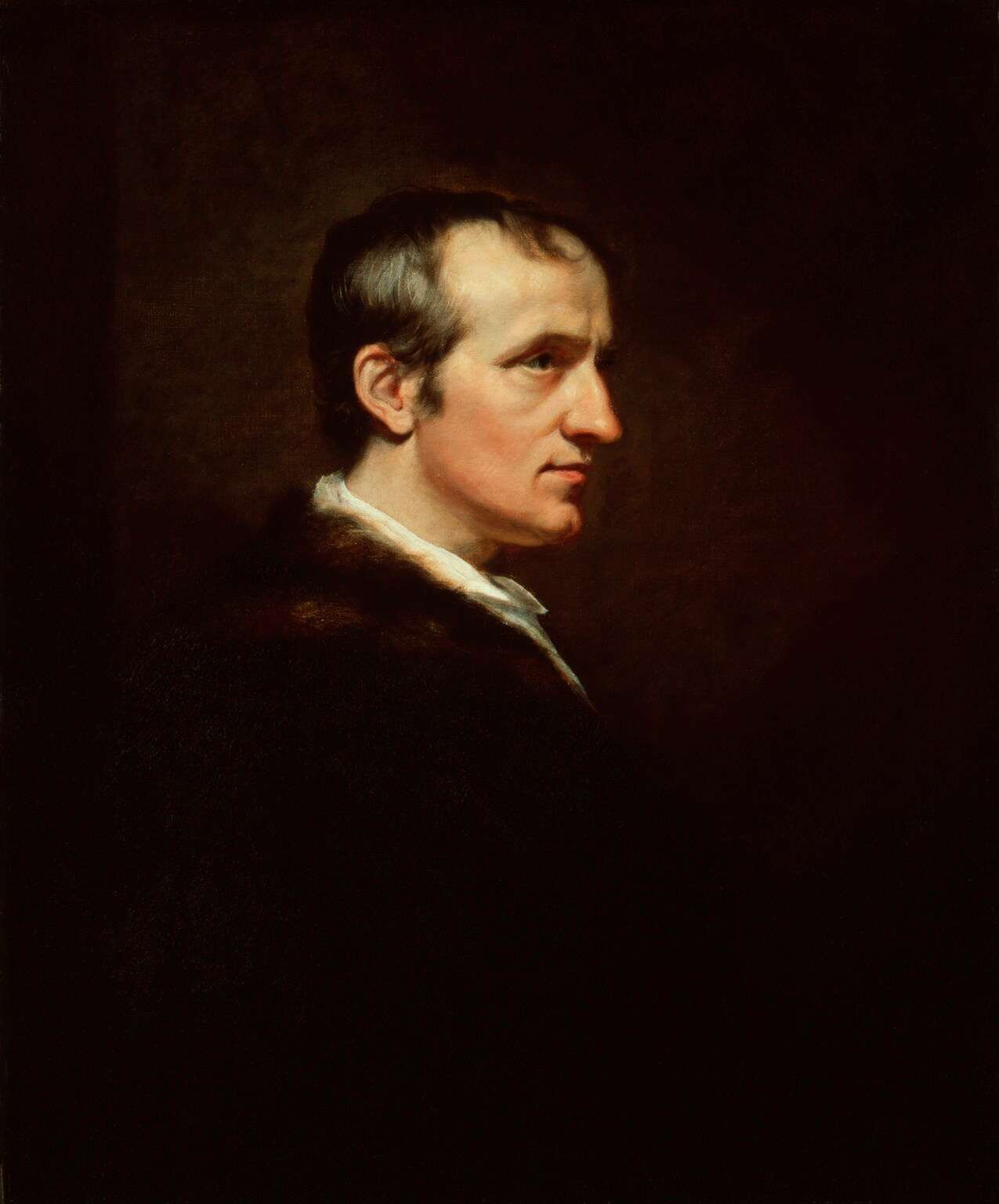
William Godwin in 1802.

Mary Jane and William married on 21 December 1801; this marriage, like his first, was precipitated by the bride's pregnancy. She gave birth six months later to a son they named William, but the infant died. She conceived again soon afterwards, and went on to have another boy, to whom they gave the same name: William Godwin the Younger, born in 1803.

Despite financial difficulties and a general dislike of Mary Jane among Godwin's friends, their marriage appears to have been solid, with Claire Clairmont describing her mother's 'affection and devotion to Godwin' as 'admirable and... unalterable from the day of their marriage till his death'. Her stepdaughter Mary wrote variously about Mary Jane: once writing that 'somthing [sic] very analogous to disgust arises whenever I mention her', but later - after her death - that 'It seemed strange that so restless a spirit could be hushed, & all that remained pent up in a grave. I had done all I could to help her during life'. The diarist Henry Crabb Robinson observed her to be "a meretorious wife".

Mary Jane and William remained married for 35 years, until Godwin's death in 1836. For some years they lived in grace and favour accommodation within the Palace of Westminster, following his award of a sinecure position as Office Keeper and Yeoman Usher of the Receipt of the Exchequer.

== The Juvenile Library ==
Mary Jane Godwin played an active role in the literary and cultural society of the time. Fluent in French, she worked as a translator, as well as being an editor of children's books.

Mary Jane and William Godwin opened, in 1805, a bookshop and publishing house. M. J. Godwin & Co. (as it was known from 1807) published, among other titles, the enduringly popular The Swiss Family Robinson (originally named Family Robinson Crusoe). The shop specialised in literature for children, and also published Tales from Shakespeare by Charles and Mary Lamb. It was Mary Jane, not William, who ran the business, which was profitable. Debt and financial troubles plagued the couple throughout their marriage, and the bookshop was eventually lost to bankruptcy.

== Death and legacy ==
Mary Jane Godwin died at home in London on 17 June 1841, and was buried in St. Pancras churchyard beside her husband. When the remains of William Godwin and Mary Wollstonecraft were moved to the Shelley family vault in Bournemouth, with the development of the nearby railway, Mary Jane's body was not reinterred.

Due in part to the reception of Mary Jane by her stepdaughter, and the remarks made by Godwin's literary friends (who idolised Godwin's first wife, Mary Wollstonecraft), her reputation has suffered and her own work been underestimated. It has since been acknowledged that Mary Jane Godwin occupied a 'singular professional position' as 'the only female publisher of substance in the London literary world of the early 1800s'.

Of the five children she brought up, all of them worked as writers or educators. The eldest and the youngest both pre-deceased her: Fanny in 1816 and William in 1832. Charles Gaulis Clairmont ended up as Chair of English literature at Vienna University and taught sons of the royal family; news of his sudden death in 1849 distressed Maximilian, Emperor of Mexico. Mary eloped with Percy Shelley, the poet, and wrote Frankenstein. Claire accompanied them, had an affair with Lord Byron, and presented Mary Jane Godwin with her first grandchild, Allegra Byron. The little girl died aged five, but later grandchildren were Mary's only surviving child, Percy Florence Shelley, and the son and daughter of Charles.
