= Marion Kingston Stocking =

Marion Kingston Stocking (June 4, 1922 – May 12, 2009) was an American literary scholar, educator, editor, book reviewer, advocate for the arts, memoirist, and environmentalist whose career spanned six decades. She was best known as editor of Beloit Poetry Journal and as a scholar of the Romantic period, specifically the circle of writers and thinkers associated with poets Percy Bysshe Shelley and Lord Byron.

== Life ==
=== Early life and education ===
Marion Stocking was born in Bethlehem, Pennsylvania, on June 4, 1922, the oldest daughter of William and Louisa (Schucholtz) Kingston. She grew up in Melrose, Massachusetts, and graduated magna cum laude from Mount Holyoke College in 1943 with an A.B. in English composition. She went on to study English literature as a graduate student at Duke University, receiving her PhD in 1952. At Duke she worked with Newman Ivey White, an eminent scholar of the Romantic period. Her doctoral research, which focused on Claire Clairmont, a step-sister of Mary Shelley and lover of Lord Byron, led to her dissertation, "Claire Clairmont: a biographical and critical study," and to a long career as a Romanticist.

=== Career ===
Stocking's teaching career began in 1946 at the University of Maine Orono. In 1950 she accepted a position at the University of Colorado, where she taught until spring of 1954 and served as an editorial intern for the Colorado Quarterly. She taught at Beloit College from 1954 (when she was the first woman to be hired to a tenure-track position in the English department) until her retirement in 1984. She was promoted to associate professor in 1959 and to professor in 1965.

Upon her arrival at the college, she was assigned a shared office with David Mackenzie Stocking. They married in 1955. She also joined him on the editorial staff of the Beloit Poetry Journal, a quarterly review of contemporary poetry founded in 1950 as a college publication by poet and colleague Chad Walsh and Robert H. Glauber, an art historian. It soon became clear that Marion Stocking was a talented critic of contemporary poetry. She wrote book reviews for the journal from 1964 to 2008, establishing a national reputation as an insightful and judicious reader, and promoting the careers of A.R. Ammons, Mary Oliver, Alice Fulton, and many others. Editor and poet Philip Fried wrote in his tribute to her in the Fall/Winter 2009/2010 issue of The Manhattan Review, "she was one of the most knowledgeable and sympathetic readers of contemporary poetry I have ever known."

The journal eventually became a life project for her and David Stocking. They shared editorial duties until his death in 1984, after which Marion continued as editor-in-chief, setting a goal of making the journal financially self-sustaining. This was achieved when the editorial board created the Beloit Poetry Journal Foundation, thanks in part to a $50,000 grant from the Stephen and Tabitha King Foundation.

Other editors who worked with Marion on the journal over the years included David Ignatow, Bink Noll, John Rosenwald, Ann Arbor, and Lee Sharkey. During Marion Stocking's long tenure, the journal was the first or early publisher of such poetic luminaries as Charles Bukowski, Anne Sexton, W.S. Merwin, Adrienne Rich, Philip Levine, Sharon Olds, Jonathan Aldrich, Galway Kinnell, and Sherman Alexie. In 2000, Marion Stocking edited the journal's 50th anniversary anthology, A Fine Excess.

Stocking published two major works of scholarship, both focused on the life and associations of Mary Shelley's step-sister Claire Clairmont. Both works are significant for the light they shed on the lives and thinking of Percy Shelley and Lord Byron and their friends. The first appeared in 1968: The Journals of Claire Clairmont, 1814–1827, edited with the assistance of David Mackenzie Stocking. The second publication, appearing in 1995, was a two-volume collection of The Clairmont Correspondence, 1808–1879, the culminating work of a career of biographical research. William St Clair, reviewing the volumes for the Literary Review, called the publication "an event in literary history. The last remaining unpublished source for Shelley and Byron, and for the long Victorian aftermath endured by the women, is now made available in a magnificent edition. Most of the letters are published in full for the first time. Marion Kingston Stocking ... is the perfect editor, and the book is a delight." In recognition of her scholarly achievements, Stocking received the Keats-Shelley Society Distinguished Scholar Award in 1996 and the International Byron Society Elma Dangerfield Prize in 1997.

With funds provided by friends of the Stockings in 1984, Beloit College established the David & Marion Stocking Prize, which is awarded annually to the student who submits the best piece of non-fiction prose.

=== Post-retirement ===
Upon retirement, Stocking moved to Lamoine, Maine, where she and her husband had spent their summers since 1970. In addition to her editorial work, Marion Stocking devoted fifteen years of service to the Maine arts community, first as a member of the Maine Arts Commission (1984–1988) and then as chair of its Literature Panel (1986–1988). She later served as a commissioner and chair of the Community Arts Committee (1993–1999). In 1997 she edited the Hancock County Cultural Directory. Meanwhile, she continued teaching and mentoring for special projects as a faculty associate of the College of the Atlantic in Bar Harbor, Maine.

Until 1992, Stocking continued her work as a licensed bird bander for the U.S. Fish and Wildlife Service, having begun this work in Wisconsin in 1960. Her memoir, "A Boomer's Journal," recounts episodes as a naturalist observing prairie chicken populations. She supported land conservation, particularly in the remote parts of Maine. She was one of the group of environmentalists that founded Quoddy Regional Land Trust in coastal Washington County. She was concerned about the destruction of the natural environment.

Marion Stocking died of cancer May 12, 2009, after a short illness and brief hospital stay.

David Lehman, series editor for Best American Poetry, honored her with a memorial statement: "Blessed be they who read poetry for pleasure and write about it with passion and joy. Marion K. Stocking, who edited the Beloit Poetry Journal and wrote about contemporary poetry with the ardor of a true believer, died on Tuesday at the age of 86. She was a great lady."

Marion Stocking's papers are housed in the Beloit College Archives, and she is represented in the Maine Women Writers Collection in the archives of the University of New England.

== Bibliography ==
=== Scholarship and editing ===
- Editor, A Fine Excess: Fifty Years of the Beloit Poetry Journal (Beloit Poetry Journal Foundation 2000)
- Editor, The Clairmont Correspondence: Letters of Claire Clairmont, Charles Clairmont, and Fanny Imlay Godwin, Volume 1: 1808–1834 (Johns Hopkins University Press 1995)
- Editor, The Clairmont Correspondence, Volume 2: 1835–1879 (Johns Hopkins University Press 1995)
- Contributing editor, Shelley and His Circle, 1773–1822, Volume 5, edited by Donald H. Reiman (Harvard University Press 1973)
- Editor, The Journals of Claire Clairmont, 1814–1827 (Harvard University Press 1968)

=== Memoirs ===
- To the Wilderness: A Memoir (University of Delaware Press 2010).
- “From Bunker Hill to Baghdad: My Lifetime of Wars,” North Dakota Quarterly (2008) Summer-Fall; 75(3–4) 185–199.
- I Got the Idear: My Love Affair with Maine Language, Northeast Folklore, volume 40 (Maine Folklife Center, University of Maine 2007).
- “A Boomer’s Journal,” The Passenger Pigeon Journal 67:3 (Fall 2005).
- “Claire, Kairos, and Great Companions: One Scholar's Way in the World,” Keats-Shelley Journal (2005), 22-33.
- “The Gathering” (on E.B. White), Down East: The Magazine of Maine (October 2003).

== Awards and honors ==
- 2008: Mt. Holyoke College Alumnae Achievement Award
- 2000: Honorary Doctor of Humane Letters, Beloit College
- 1998: Distinguished Achievement Award, University of Maine at Machias
- 1997: International Byron Society Elma Dangerfield Prize
- 1996: Keats-Shelley Society Distinguished Scholar Award (presented by Donald H. Reiman)
- 1992: Honorary D.Litt, University of Maine at Fort Kent
- 1943: Election to Phi Beta Kappa
