= Henry Stockings =

English Royal Air Force officer

Henry Rayner Stockings (22 August 1916 – 10 February 2015) was an English Royal Air Force officer, who was involved in the bombing of Danzig during the Second World War, and who later carried out secret intelligence work as a prisoner of war.

After the war he became a successful pig breeder.
