= Sandhill Park =

Country house in Somerset, England

Coordinates: 51.061816°N 3.205433°W

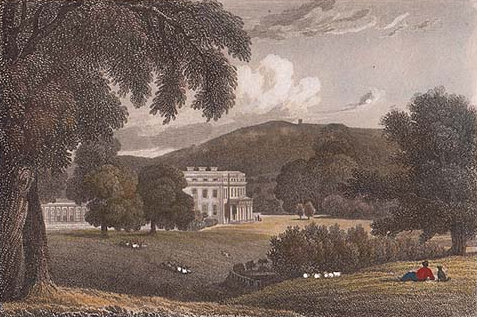
"Sandhill Park, Somersetshire, drawn by J.P. Neale, engraved by W.Taylor, published by Scope(?) & C.Temple of M.. Finsbury (?) Square, London, 1829"

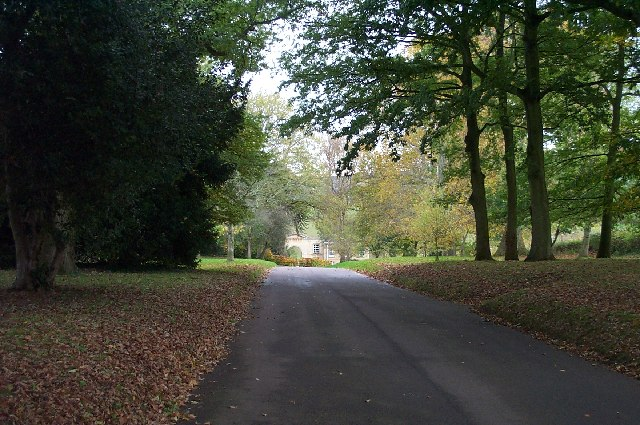
Grounds of Sandhill House

Sandhill Park in the parish of Bishops Lydeard, Somerset, England is a derelict country house built in about 1720. It was used in the 20th century as a prisoner of war camp, a home for handicapped children and later as a military and civilian hospital.

== History ==
The estate was originally known as "Hill". In St Mary's Church, Bishops Lydeard, is a monument inscribed as follows:

"In a vault near this place lyeth the body of Elizabeth Periam, relict of John Periam of Hill, Esq, and dau(ghter) of John Southey of Fitzhead, Esq. ...she ....died lamented May 14, 1767, aged 68 ... Sarah, dau of John Periam of Milverton and heir to her brother John Periam of Hill, married 1719 died 21 June 1771 aet 74 wife of Thomas Lethbridge".

John I Periam (1657-1711) of Milverton was the father of Sarah Periam, the wife firstly of Thomas Lethbridge (d.1734), a lawyer of Clement's Inn and secondly of George Bere of Taunton, a Doctor of Physick. In St Michael's Church, Milverton, is a ledger stone inscribed as follows: "Here lyeth the body of John Periam, Gent., who dyed Sept. 19 1711 aged 54".

The mansion was built in 1720 by John II Periam, the Member of Parliament for Minehead, and named "Hill House". It was afterwards lived in by the Lethbridge family from 1767 to 1913.

During World War I it was used as a prisoner of war camp for German and Austrian Officers. In 1919 it was converted by Somerset County Council into a home for handicapped children.

It was requisitioned by the military in August 1940 and became the 41st General Military Hospital, providing accommodation in tents and huts. From 1941 the hospital was leased to the Americans as a neurological hospital for over 1,000 patients in 32 new wards which were completed in 1943. In 1943, the US Army 127th General Hospital moved in caring for patients and preparing to follow the invasion forces. In May 1944, the 127th was replaced by the 185th General Hospital that continued to staff the hospital until July 1945. See 185th General Hospital. The hospital remained in military use until 1945. The psychiatric hospital reopened under the National Health Service in 1948 and further buildings were constructed.

The hospital was sold in 1991 and housing built on part of the area. It is included in the Heritage at Risk Register produced by English Heritage.

The derelict building was badly damaged by fire on 22 November 2011, which was caused by arson. The east wing gutted along with more modern additions to the rear. The main house suffered extensive damage, the roof and top floor being lost and significant secondary damage caused by fire water. The west wing and orangery appear to have been untouched by the fire.

In 2013 Sandhill Park was purchased by local developer Strongvox Homes. After years of decay and the serious fire in 2011 the only viable way to save the mansion house was for a sympathetic development of new houses in the grounds. Strongvox Homes worked closely with the planning department and English Heritage and in 2012 planning permission was approved for 28 detached houses and the conversion of the mansion house into 26 apartments. Sadly Strongvox were unable to complete the work and for some time the development was halted. Now the Akkeron Building group have completed the first phase, marketing and selling the converted stables into 10 units and they are now working on the main house.
