= Timeline of Jane Austen =

Austen family tree, showing Jane Austen's parents and her brothers and sister

Austen family tree, showing Jane Austen's brothers' marriages and children

The English novelist Jane Austen (16 December 1775 – 18 July 1817) lived her entire life as part of a family located socially and economically on the lower fringes of the English gentry. The Rev. George Austen and Cassandra Leigh, Jane's parents, lived in Steventon, Hampshire, where Rev. Austen was the rector of the Anglican parish from 1765 until 1801. Austen's immediate family was large and close-knit. She had six brothers—James, George, Charles, Francis, Henry, and Edward—and a beloved older sister, Cassandra. Austen's brother Edward was made the heir of Thomas and Elizabeth Knight <family record> and eventually inherited their estates at Godmersham, Kent, and Chawton, Hampshire. In 1801, Rev. Austen retired from the ministry and moved his family to Bath, Somerset. He died in 1805 and for the next four years, Jane, Cassandra, and their mother lived first in rented quarters and then in Southampton where they shared a house with Frank Austen's family. During these unsettled years, they spent much time visiting various branches of the family. In 1809, Jane, Cassandra, and their mother moved permanently into a large "cottage" in Chawton village that was part of Edward's nearby estate. Austen lived at Chawton until she moved to Winchester for medical treatment shortly before her death in 1817.

Throughout their adult lives, Jane and Cassandra were close to their cousin, Eliza de Feuillide, and to neighbors Mary and Martha Lloyd. Mary became the second wife of Austen's brother James, and Martha lived with the Austen family (beginning shortly after Rev. Austen's death in 1805) and married Austen's brother Frank late in life. Jane and Cassandra were also friends for many years with three sisters, Alethea, Elizabeth and Catherine Bigg, who lived at Manydown Park. Anne Brydges Lefroy, wife of Rev. George Lefroy, "became Jane Austen's best-loved and admired mentor, the person she would always run to for advice and encouragement" after the Lefroys moved to nearby Ashe in 1783. Her death in a riding accident in 1804 left Jane grief-stricken.

Austen met, danced with, and perhaps fell in love with Thomas Lefroy during the Christmas holidays in 1795. However, Lefroy departed to begin his law studies in January 1796 and he and Jane never saw each other again. Samuel Blackall, a Fellow of Emmanuel College, Cambridge, and a friend of Mrs. Anne Lefroy, was seriously interested in marrying Austen in 1797. Austen family tradition holds that Jane and an unnamed young clergyman fell in love while the Austen family visited the seaside at Sidmouth in the summer of 1801. Cassandra is said to have approved of this young man, but he died unexpectedly several months later, before he and Jane could be together again. Austen received her only proposal of marriage from Harris Bigg-Wither, brother of her friends Alethea, Elizabeth and Catherine Bigg, while visiting them at their home in December 1802. Austen at first accepted the proposal, then realized she had made a mistake and withdrew her acceptance the next day. Austen biographer Park Honan suggests that Jane may have received a proposal of marriage from Edward Bridges, a brother of Edward Austen's wife Elizabeth, in 1805, but biographer Claire Tomalin dismisses this claim.

Jane Austen was primarily educated at home by her father and older brothers and through her own reading. Her apprenticeship as a writer lasted from her teenage years until she was about thirty-five years old. During this period, she wrote three major novels and began a fourth. From 1811 until 1815, with the release of Sense and Sensibility (1811), Pride and Prejudice (1813), Mansfield Park (1814), and Emma (1815), she achieved success as a published writer. She wrote two additional novels, Northanger Abbey (originally written in 1798–1799 and revised later) and Persuasion, both published after her death in 1817, and began a third (eventually titled Sanditon), but died before it could be completed. A product of 18th-century literary traditions, Austen's works were influenced most by those of renowned writer and critic Samuel Johnson and novelists Frances Burney and Maria Edgeworth. She considered poet and novelist Sir Walter Scott a rival. Family theatricals, which included plays by Richard Brinsley Sheridan and other 18th-century dramatists, shaped Austen's writing from an early age. William Cowper's poetry was a favourite as were the novels of Samuel Richardson. Austen's engagement with sensibility illustrates her debt to sentimental writers such as Laurence Sterne.

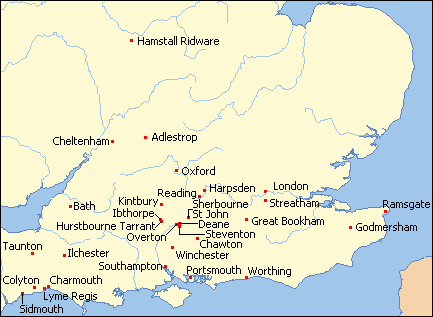
Map of places Jane Austen lived or visited

(Each dot is wikilinked to the article for that place)

Austen published all of her novels in the Regency period, during which King George III was declared permanently insane and his son was appointed as prince regent, and the novels are firmly rooted in the social context of the time. Throughout most of Austen's adult life, Britain was at war with revolutionary France. Fearing the spread of revolution and violence to Britain, the government tried to repress political radicals by suspending habeas corpus and passing the Seditious Meetings Act and the Treasonable Practices Act, known as the "Gagging Acts". Many reformers still held out hope for change in Britain during the 1790s, but by the first two decades of the 19th century, the French Revolutionary Wars and the Napoleonic Wars had exhausted the country and a deep conservative reaction had set in. While Austen's novels rarely explicitly touch on these events, she herself was personally affected by them, as two of her brothers served in the Royal Navy. When Napoleon was finally defeated at the Battle of Waterloo in 1815, Britain rejoiced. However, economic hardships in the 1810s increased the income disparity in the country and class conflict rose as the Industrial Revolution began.

== 1760s ==
Year	Austen	Literary history	Political history
1764	26 April – Marriage of Rev. George Austen, rector of Steventon parish, and Cassandra Leigh		
1765	13 February – James Austen (Jane's brother) born at Deane, Hampshire	Publication of William Shakespeare's collected works edited by Samuel Johnson; Publication of Horace Walpole's The Castle of Otranto, widely considered the first Gothic novel; Publication of the final ten volumes of L'Encyclopédie (begun 1751)	March – Riots erupt in American colonies after the British parliament levies the stamp tax
1766	26 August – George Austen (Jane's brother) born at Deane	Publication of Oliver Goldsmith's novel The Vicar of Wakefield	
1767	7 October – Edward Austen (Jane's brother) born at Deane	A charitable couple giving money to a poor monk.: Publication of Laurence Sterne's novel A Sentimental Journey through France and Italy (pictured)	James Cook voyages to Australia and New Zealand (1768–1771)
1768	July–August – Austen family moves to Steventon, Hampshire		
1769		David Garrick's Shakespeare Jubilee celebration at Stratford-on-Avon	

== 1770s ==
Year	Austen	Literary history	Political history
1770		Publication of Goldsmith's poem The Deserted Village	January – Frederick, Lord North becomes Prime Minister of Great Britain (1770–1782)
1771	8 June – Henry Thomas Austen (Jane's brother) born at Steventon	Publication of the first edition of the Encyclopædia Britannica completed (begun 1768)	Richard Arkwright opens the first cotton mill in Cromford, Derbyshire, England
1772		Publication of final volumes of plates of the Philosophes' Encyclopédie (begun 1751)	22 June – Slavery is effectively outlawed in England
1773	9 January – Cassandra Elizabeth Austen (Austen's sister) born at Steventon; 23 March – Rev. Austen becomes rector of Deane parish in addition to Steventon; Pupils live at Steventon from 1773 to 1796		16 December – American colonists protest against British policies by dumping tea into Boston Harbour
1774	23 April – Francis (Frank) Austen (Jane's brother) born at Steventon	Publication of Goethe's novel The Sorrows of Young Werther	May – Louis XVI (pictured) ascends to the throne of France; Warren Hastings becomes the first Governor-General of India
1775	16 December – Jane Austen born at Steventon	Publication of Samuel Johnson's travel narrative A Journey to the Western Islands of Scotland	19 April – American War of Independence begins with the Battle of Lexington (1775–1783)
1776		Publication of Adam Smith's An Inquiry into the Nature and Causes of the Wealth of Nations	
1778		Publication of Frances Burney's novel Evelina; Publication of Jean-Jacques Rousseau's Reveries of a Solitary Walker	
1779	23 June – Charles Austen (Jane's brother) born at Steventon; 3 July – James Austen matriculates at St. John's College, Oxford	Publication of Johnson's (pictured) biographies Lives of the Poets (1779–1781)	

== 1780s ==
Year	Austen	Literary history	Political history
1780		Publication of The Education of Humanity by Gotthold Ephraim Lessing	2–11 June – Gordon Riots in London, protesting the Catholic Relief Act
1781		Publication of Schiller's drama The Robbers; Publication of Immanuel Kant's philosophical treatise Critique of Pure Reason	19 October – Franco-American force defeats the British at the Battle of Yorktown, effectively ending the fighting in America during War of Independence
1782	December – First amateur theatrical production at Steventon – Matilda	Publication of Frances Burney's (pictured) novel Cecilia; Posthumous publication of the first part of Rousseau's autobiographical Confessions; Publication of Pierre Choderlos de Laclos's novel Les Liaisons dangereuses	
1783	Edward Austen adopted by Mr. and Mrs. Thomas Knight of Godmersham, Kent; Spring – Jane Austen, Cassandra Austen, and Jane Cooper sent to live with Mrs. Cawley in Oxford to be educated; Summer – Mrs. Cawley moves to Southampton and the girls fall ill		3 September – Treaty of Paris signed, formally ending the American War of Independence; December – William Pitt becomes Prime Minister of Great Britain
1784	Amateur theatricals at Steventon continue – The Rivals		Pitt's India Act gives the British Crown (rather than officers of the East India Company) the power to guide Indian politics
1785	Spring – Austen and Cassandra attend Abbey School, Reading, Berkshire	Publication of William Cowper's (pictured) poem The Task	
1786	Edward Austen takes the Grand Tour of the Continent (1786–90); April – Francis Austen enters the Royal Naval Academy at Portsmouth; November – James Austen travels to the Continent; December – Austen and Cassandra leave Abbey School	Publication of Robert Burns's Poems Chiefly in the Scottish Dialect	December – Shays' Rebellion in the United States (December 1786 – January 1787); Beginning of impeachment proceedings in British Parliament brought by Edmund Burke against Warren Hastings, Governor-General of India
1787	Austen begins writing juvenilia (pictured); Autumn – James Austen returns from the Continent; December – Amateur theatricals at Steventon continue – The Wonder		13 May – First fleet of convicts sails to penal colony in Australia from Britain; 22 May – Committee for the Abolition of the Slave Trade is formed in Britain
1788	January – Amateur theatricals continue at Steventon – The Chances; March – Amateur theatrical continue at Steventon – Tom Thumb; 1 July – Henry Austen matriculates at St. John's College, Oxford; Summer – Mr. and Mrs. Austen take Jane and Cassandra to Kent and London; 23 December – Francis Austen leaves the Royal Naval Academy and sails to the East Indies; Winter – Amateur theatricals continue at Steventon – The Sultan and High Life Below Stairs	1 January – First edition of The Times is published; Publication of Charlotte Smith's (pictured) novel Emmeline	November – Beginning of the Regency Crisis, caused by George III's madness
1789	Publication of the first issue of James Austen's periodical The Loiterer; issued weekly until March 1790	29 April – Publication of former slave Olaudah Equiano's autobiography The Interesting Narrative of the Life of Olaudah Equiano; Publication of William Blake's poems Songs of Innocence; Posthumous publication of the second part of Rousseau's autobiographical Confessions	14 July – Storming of the Bastille in Paris (pictured); 26 August – The French Assembly adopts the Declaration of the Rights of Man and of the Citizen; 5–6 October – "October days"; Parisian women, unable to buy bread, march to Versailles and bring the royal family back to Paris; December – End of the Regency Crisis (George III recovers)

== 1790s ==
Year	Austen	Literary history	Political history
1790	James Austen takes up residence as curate of Overton, Hampshire; Autumn – Edward Austen returns to England from Grand Tour	1 November – Publication of Edmund Burke's Reflections on the Revolution in France	Parliament withdraws motions for the repeal of the Test and Corporation Acts
1791	Charles Austen enters the Royal Naval Academy; 15 September – James Austen becomes vicar of Sherborne St John, Hampshire; 27 December – Edward Austen marries Elizabeth Bridges; they move to Rowling House, Edward's residence in Kent	February–March – Publication of Part I of Thomas Paine's pamphlet Rights of Man; Publication of Elizabeth Inchbald's novel A Simple Story; Publication of James Boswell's biography Life of Johnson; Publication of Ann Radcliffe's novel The Romance of the Forest; Publication of Smith's novel Celestina	19 April – The British parliament rejects William Wilberforce's bill to abolish the slave trade; 14–17 July – Priestley Riots; rioting aimed at religious Dissenters in Birmingham; August – 100,000 slaves and ex-slaves revolt against planters and the local government in French-controlled San Domingo, the wealthiest colony of the West Indies and main source of sugar and coffee in Europe
1792	27 March – James Austen marries Anne Mathew; they move to the parsonage in Deane; October – Jane and Cassandra Austen visit the Lloyds at Ibthorpe House, near Hurstbourne Tarrant, Hampshire; Winter? – Cassandra Austen engaged to Rev. Tom Fowle	Publication of Robert Bage's novel Man As He Is; Publication of Hannah More's pamphlet Village Politics; Publication of Smith's novel Desmond	7 March – Sierra Leone is established under British rule as a home for former slaves; 10 August – Attack on the Tuileries Palace leads to the deposition of Louis XVI and the dissolution of the Legislative Assembly; 2–6 September – "September Massacres"; 12,000 political prisoners murdered in France; 21 September – Newly elected National Convention abolishes the monarchy and officially declares France a Republic
1793	? – Austen begins to write, then sets aside, Sir Charles Grandison or the happy Man, a comedy in 6 acts; 23 January – Edward Austen's first child, Fanny, born; Spring – Henry Austen becomes a lieutenant in the Oxfordshire Militia; 15 April – James Austen's first child, Anna, is born; 3 June – Jane Austen writes last item of juvenilia; Winter – Francis Austen returns home from the Far East; December – Jane and Cassandra Austen visit Butler-Harrison cousins in Southampton	14 February – Publication of William Godwin's treatise Political Justice; Publication of Smith's novel The Old Manor House	21 January – Execution of Louis XVI; 1 February – France declares war on England; 11 March – Civil war erupts in France with the revolt in the Vendée; July – Beginning of the Reign of Terror in France; 16 October – Execution of Marie Antoinette (pictured)
1794	22 February – Eliza de Feuillide's husband is guillotined in Paris; Midsummer – Jane and Cassandra Austen visit the Leighs at Adlestrop, Gloucestershire; August? – Jane and Cassandra Austen visit Edward and Elizabeth Austen at Rowling; September – Charles Austen leaves the Royal Naval Academy and goes to sea; Autumn? – Austen possibly writes Lady Susan	28 May – Publication of Godwin's novel Caleb Williams; Publication of Blake's poems Songs of Experience; Publication of Radcliffe's novel The Mysteries of Udolpho	4 February – France abolishes slavery in its colonies; 7 May – The writ of habeas corpus is suspended in Britain; Late July – Robespierre is executed and the Reign of Terror ends; November – British radicals are acquitted at the 1794 Treason Trials
1795	Austen probably writes Elinor and Marianne; 3 May – Death of Anne Mathew (James' wife) at Deane; infant Anna sent to live at Steventon rectory; Autumn – Rev. Tom Fowle joins William Craven, 1st Earl of Craven, as his private chaplain for the West Indian campaign; December–January 1796 – Austen's flirtation with Tom Lefroy on his visit to Ashe rectory	Hannah More (pictured) begins publishing the Cheap Repository Tracts to counteract radical publications	29 October – On the way to parliament, George III is attacked by a hungry mob; 18 December – Seditious Meetings Act and Treasonable Practices Act passed (also known as the "Two Acts" or the "Gagging Acts"); The Famine Year
1796	January – Tom Lefroy (pictured) leaves Ashe for London; January – Tom Fowle sails for the West Indies; April – Jane and Cassandra Austen visit the Coopers at Harpsden, Oxfordshire; Summer? – James Austen courts Eliza de Feuillide; August – Edward and Francis Austen take Jane to Rowling via London; she returns to Steventon in late September or early October; October – Austen begins writing First Impressions (Pride and Prejudice); November – James Austen engaged to Mary Lloyd	Publication of Bage's novel Hermsprong; Publication of Mary Hays's novel Memoirs of Emma Courtney; Publication of Burney's novel Camilla; Publication of Matthew Lewis's novel The Monk; Publication of Madame de Staël's essay De l'Influence des passions	December – Failed French landing at Bantry Bay, West Cork, Ireland; Failure of peace negotiations between Britain and France
1797	17 January – James Austen marries Mary Lloyd; January – Anna returns to live at Deane; February – Tom Fowle dies of fever in San Domingo and is buried at sea; August – Austen finishes First Impressions; 1 November – Revd. Austen unsuccessfully offers First Impressions to Thomas Cadell, London publisher; November – Austen begins to revise Elinor and Marianne, which eventually becomes Sense and Sensibility; November – Mrs. Austen, Jane, and Cassandra visit the Leigh-Perrots in Bath; November – Edward Austen and family move from Rowling to Godmersham Park, near Godmersham, Kent; Winter – Rev. Samuel Blackall visits Ashe; mild courtship of Jane Austen; 31 December – Henry Austen marries Eliza de Feuillide	20 November – Publication of the first issue of the government-sponsored journal, the Anti-Jacobin Review; Publication of Radcliffe's novel The Italian	February – Bank of England suspends cash payments; April–June – Naval mutinies occur at Spithead and the Nore; Failure of French landing in Wales
1798	August – Mr. and Mrs. Austen, Jane, and Cassandra visit Godmersham; August – Austen possibly begins writing Susan (which eventually becomes Northanger Abbey); 9 August – Lady Williams (Jane Cooper) killed in a road accident; 24 October – Austen and her parents leave Godmersham and return to Steventon; October–November – Mrs. Austen ill; 17 November – James Austen's son, James-Edward, born	June – Publication of Thomas Robert Malthus's An Essay on the Principle of Population; Publication of William Wordsworth and Samuel Taylor Coleridge's poems Lyrical Ballads; Publication of Smith's novel The Young Philosopher	26 May – Society of United Irishmen rebel against British rule in Ireland; August–September – French landing in Ireland; 1 August – Horatio Nelson's victory over Napoleon's fleet at the Battle of the Nile (pictured)
1799	February – Jane Austen possibly visits the Lloyds at Ibthorpe; March – Cassandra returns to Steventon from Godmersham; 17 May–June – Mrs. Austen and Jane arrive in Bath, with Edward and Elizabeth; End of June – Austen probably finishes Susan (Northanger Abbey); Late summer – The Austens pay a round of visits to the Leighs at Adlestrop, the Coopers at Harpsden, and the Cookes at Great Bookham; 14 August – Austen's aunt, Mrs. Leigh Perrot, charged with theft and committed to Ilchester Gaol	Publication of More's Strictures on the Modern System of Education; Publication of Jane West's novel A Tale of the Times	Religious Tract Society formed in Britain; 9 November – 18 Brumaire; Napoleon overthrows the Directory and becomes First Consul of France

== 1800s ==
Year	Austen	Literary history	Political history
1800	29 March – Mrs. Leigh Perrot tried at Taunton and acquitted; October – Edward Austen visits Steventon and takes Cassandra back to Godmersham with him via Chawton and London; October - Jane visits her friends, the Bramstons, at Oakley Hall near Steventon Rectory; End of November–mid-December – Jane Austen visits the Lloyds at Ibthorpe; December – Revd. Austen decides to retire and move to Bath; ? – Austen revises and completes Sir Charles Grandison	Publication of Maria Edgeworth's novel Castle Rackrent; Publication of Mary Robinson's (pictured) Lyrical Tales; Publication of Elizabeth Hamilton's Memoirs of Modern Philosophers	Food riots in Britain; Robert Owen founds model factory at New Lanark
1801	January – Henry Austen resigns commission in Oxfordshire militia and sets up as a banker and army agent in London; End of January – Jane Austen visits the Bigg-Wither family at Manydown; February – Cassandra returns to Steventon from Godmersham via London; May – Austen family leaves Steventon and settles in Bath; May – Mrs. Austen and Jane travel to Bath via Ibthorpe, and stay with the Leigh-Perrots; May – James Austen and his family move to Steventon rectory; End of May – Austen family takes a West Country holiday, probably visiting Sidmouth and Colyton; End of May – Jane Austen's West Country romance with a young clergyman may have occurred; September – Austen family visits Steventon and Ashe; 5 October – Austen family returns to Bath	Publication of Edgeworth's novel Belinda; Publication of Hamilton's Letters on Education	1 January – Act of Union creates the United Kingdom; 1 October – Truce between Britain and France
1802	April – James, Mary, and Anna visit the Austen family at Bath; Summer – Charles Austen joins the Austens for the holidays; 1 September – Jane and Cassandra Austen arrive at Steventon; 3 September – Charles takes Jane and Cassandra to Godmersham; 28 October – Charles brings his sisters back to Steventon; 25 November – Jane and Cassandra visit the Biggs family at Manydown; 2 December – Harris Bigg-Wither unexpectedly proposes marriage to Jane Austen; she accepts; 3 December – Austen rejects Bigg-Wither's proposal; she and Cassandra return to Steventon and leave at once for Bath; Winter – Austen revises Susan (Northanger Abbey)	Publication of Walter Scott's (pictured) collection of ballads Minstrelsy of the Scottish Border; Publication of West's novel The Infidel Father	27 March – Treaty of Amiens signed; 18-month break in wars with France
1803	Spring – Austen sells copyright for Susan to Benjamin Crosby, a London publisher, for £10; 18 May – Henry and Eliza nearly trapped in France when Napoleon breaks the Peace of Amiens; Summer – Austen possibly visits Charmouth, Up Lyme, and Pinny; July – Francis Austen stationed at Ramsgate; September–October – Rev. and Mrs. Austen, probably accompanied by Jane and Cassandra, stay at Godmersham; October – Jane and Cassandra visit Ashe; 24 October – Jane and Cassandra return to Bath; November – Austen family visits Lyme Regis		12 May – Peace of Amiens ends; war resumes with France
1804	Jane Austen probably writes The Watsons; Spring – Mrs. Austen seriously ill; Summer – Austens, with Henry and Eliza, visit Lyme Regis; 25 October – Austens return to Bath and move to 3 Green Park Buildings East; 16 December – Jane Austen's long-time friend, Mrs. Anne Lefroy of Ashe, killed in a riding accident	Publication of Edgeworth's collection of stories Popular Tales	18 May – Napoleon (pictured) crowns himself emperor of the French
1805	21 January – Rev. George Austen (Jane's father) dies suddenly in Bath; 25 March – Mrs. Austen and her daughters move to 25 Gay Street, Bath; June – Mrs. Austen, Jane, and Cassandra travel to Godmersham via Steventon, taking Anna with them; 18 June – James Austen's daughter, Caroline, born; Summer – Possible courtship of Jane Austen by Edward Bridges; Summer – Martha Lloyd joins the Austen household; 17 September–November – Jane and Cassandra travel to Worthing	Publication of Edgeworth's (pictured) The Modern Griselda; Publication of Amelia Opie's novel Adeline Mowbray; Publication of William Godwin's novel Fleetwood	21 October – Nelson's fleet defeats combined French and Spanish fleet at the Battle of Trafalgar
1806	January – Mrs. Austen and her daughters visit Steventon; 29 January – Mrs. Austen returns to Bath and takes lodgings in Trim Street; February–mid-March – Jane and Cassandra visit the Biggs sisters at Manydown, returning to Bath via Steventon; 2 July – Mrs. Austen and her daughters finally leave Bath, and go via Clifton to Adlestrop; 24 July – Francis Austen marries Mary Gibson; 5 August – The Austens leave Adlestrop and travel to Stoneleigh Abbey with Thomas Leigh and his sister Elizabeth; 14 August–mid-October – Mrs. Austen and her daughters visit the Coopers at Hamstall Ridware; October – Austen family takes lodgings in Southampton with Francis Austen and Mary; Winter – Cassandra Austen visits Godmersham		
1807	March – Austen family moves into a house in Castle Square, Southampton; April – Henry brings Cassandra back to Southampton from Godmersham via London; 19 May – Charles Austen marries Fanny Palmer in Bermuda; September – Edward Austen arranges family gathering at Chawton Great House, followed by further family gathering in Southampton	Publication of William Wilberforce's (pictured) A Letter on the Abolition of the Slave Trade	25 March – Britain abolishes the slave trade
1808	January–March – Jane and Cassandra stay at Steventon, Manydown, and with the Fowles at Kintbury; 15 May – Henry and Jane Austen at Steventon en route to London; 14 June – Jane Austen travels to Godmersham with James and Mary; 8 July – Austen returns to Southampton; 28 September – Cassandra travels to Godmersham; 10 October – Elizabeth Austen (Edward's wife) dies after eleventh childbirth	Publication of Scott's poem Marmion; Publication of Hamilton's novel Cottagers of Glenburie; Publication of More's novel Coelebs in Search of a Wife	
1809	February – Cassandra returns to Southampton; 5 April – Austen attempts unsuccessfully to pressure Crosby to publish Susan; 15 May – Mrs. Austen and her daughters begin visit to Godmersham; 7 July – Austen family and Martha Lloyd move to Chawton Cottage (pictured); August – Jane Austen's interest in writing revives; October – Edward Austen and Fanny visit Chawton	Foundation of The Quarterly Review, the chief Tory periodical; Publication of Edgeworth's story collection Tales of Fashionable Life (1809–1812)	

== 1810s ==
Year	Austen	Literary history	Political history
1810	July–August – Jane Austen (pictured) and Cassandra visit Manydown and Steventon; November – Edward Austen and Fanny visit Chawton; Winter – Sense and Sensibility accepted for publication by Thomas Egerton, London publisher	Publication of Scott's poem "Lady of the Lake"; Publication of West's novel The Refusal	October – George III recognized as insane
1811	February – Jane Austen starts planning Mansfield Park; March – Austen stays with Henry in London; March – Austen corrects proofs of Sense and Sensibility; March – Cassandra visits Godmersham; August – Charles Austen and family return to England; 30 October – Sense and Sensibility published anonymously; November – Jane Austen visits James at Steventon; Winter? – Jane Austen begins revising First Impressions, later published as Pride and Prejudice		February – George, Prince of Wales becomes prince regent; Luddites protest industrialization in Britain (1811–1812)
1812	April – Edward Austen and Fanny visit Chawton; 9–25 June – Mrs. Austen and Jane visit Steventon; Cassandra goes to Godmersham; 14 October – Edward Austen officially adopts "Knight" as surname; Autumn – Jane Austen sells copyright of Pride and Prejudice to Egerton for £110	Publication of Lord Byron's poem Childe Harold's Pilgrimage, Cantos I and II; Publication of Anna Laetitia Barbauld's poem Eighteen Hundred and Eleven; Publication of West's novel The Loyalists	June – Napoleon invades Russia; 18 June – United States declares war on Great Britain; October–December – Napoleon's defeated army retreats from Russia (pictured)
1813	28 January – Pride and Prejudice published anonymously; 21 April – Edward Austen and family come to Chawton Great House and stay for four months; 22 April – Jane Austen goes to London to attend the dying Eliza de Feuillide; 25 April – Eliza dies; 1 May – Austen returns to Chawton; 19 May – Henry Austen takes Jane to London for a fortnight; July? – Austen finishes Mansfield Park; September – Edward Austen and Jane travel via London to Godmersham (her last visit there); 13 November – Edward Austen takes Jane back to Chawton via London; November – Second editions of Pride and Prejudice and Sense and Sensibility released; November – Mansfield Park probably accepted for publication	Publication of Byron's poems The Giaour and The Bride of Abydos to great acclaim; May – Publication of Percy Bysshe Shelley's (pictured) poem Queen Mab	
1814	21 January – Austen begins Emma; 1 March – Henry Austen takes Jane to London; April – Jane Austen returns to Chawton via Streatham; April – Edward Austen and family stay at Chawton Great House for two months; 9 May – Mansfield Park (pictured) published anonymously by Egerton; Midsummer – Austen visits the Cookes at Great Bookham, Surrey; August – Austen visits Henry in London; August – Francis Austen and family move into Chawton Great House and stay there for about two years; 3 September – Henry Austen takes Jane home to Chawton; 6 September – Charles's wife Fanny dies after childbirth; 25 November – Austen visits Henry in London; 5 December – Henry takes Jane back to Chawton; 25 December – Jane and Cassandra stay with Mrs. Heathcote and Miss Bigg in Winchester	Publication of Walter Scott's novel Waverley; Publication of Burney's novel The Wanderer; Publication of Edgeworth's novel Patronage; Publication of Byron's poem The Corsair, instantly popular; Publication of Wordsworth's poem The Excursion; Publication of Mary Martha Sherwood's children's book The History of Little Henry and his Bearer	6 April – Napoleon abdicates and is exiled to Elba; 24 December – Treaty of Ghent ends war between the United States and Britain
1815	2–16 January – Jane and Cassandra stay at Steventon; they also visit Ashe and Laverstoke; 29 March – Emma finished; March or April? – Jane and Cassandra probably visit Henry in London; 8 August – Austen begins Persuasion; August – Austen possibly goes to London to negotiate publication of Emma, returning early in September; 4 October – Austen moves to London to nurse Henry; 13 November – Austen visits the Prince Regent's Library at Carlton House; receives invitation to dedicate a future work to him; 16 December – Austen returns to Chawton; End of December – Emma published by John Murray, dedicated to the Prince Regent	Publication of Scott's novel Guy Mannering	March – Napoleon returns from Elba; May – Corn Laws passed; 18 June – Duke of Wellington (pictured) defeats Napoleon at the Battle of Waterloo; Restoration of Louis XVIII in France; 20 November – Treaty of Paris, officially ending Napoleonic Wars
1816	Spring – Jane Austen begins to feel ill; Spring – Henry buys back manuscript of Susan; Spring – Austen revises Susan as Catharine, intending to publish it; 15 March – Henry's bank fails and he leaves London; 22 May – Jane and Cassandra go to Cheltenham via Steventon; 15 June – Jane and Cassandra return to Chawton via Kintbury; 18 July – First draft of Persuasion finished; 6 August – Persuasion revised and finished; Second edition of Mansfield Park published by Murray; December – Henry is ordained and becomes curate of Chawton	Publication of Coleridge's poem "Christabel"; Publication of Coleridge's poem "Kubla Khan"; Publication of Byron's poem Childe Harold's Pilgrimage, Canto III; Byron (pictured) leaves England because of personal troubles, never to return	April – Riots in East Anglia and manufacturing districts in Britain; Elgin Marbles exhibited in the British Museum
1817	27 January–18 March – Austen works on novel later published as Sanditon; 18 March – Austen ceases work on Sanditon; 27 April – Austen makes her will; 24 May – Cassandra takes Jane to Winchester for medical treatment; 18 July – Austen dies early in the morning; 24 July – Austen is buried in Winchester Cathedral (pictured); End of December – Northanger Abbey and Persuasion are published together by Murray along with Henry's "Biographical Notice of the Author"	Publication of Coleridge's Biographia Literaria; Publication of Edgeworth's novels Ormond and Harrington; Publication of Byron's poem Manfred; Publication of Godwin's novel Mandeville; Publication of Scott's novel Rob Roy	

== See also ==
- Timeline of the French Revolution
- Napoleonic era

== Bibliography ==
- Le Faye, Deirdre. A Chronology of Jane Austen and her Family: 1700–2000. Cambridge: Cambridge University Press, 2006. ISBN 0-521-81064-7.
