= Cloudesley =

1830 novel by William Godwin

Cloudesley: A Tale (1830) is the fifth novel published by eighteenth-century philosopher and novelist William Godwin.

== Publication details ==
Cloudesley was published thirteen years after Mandeville, Godwin's fourth novel, and two years after the completion of his four-volume History of the Commonwealth of England.

== Plot ==
William Meadows, the son of the curate of Epworth in North Lincolnshire, is sent to sea as a boy after his father dies. He finds himself ill-suited to a nautical life and leaves the ship at Archangel in Russia in the final years of the reign of Peter the Great (the 1720s). He falls foul of John Ernest Biren, the principal minister of Empress Anna, who ruled Russia from 1730 to 1740 and returns to England. His sister and brother-in-law rent a farm from. Earl Danvers (Richard Herbert) of Axholme. Lord Danvers, who has seen some of William's correspondence with his sister from his time in Russia, invites him to Millwood Park; he is fifty, a widower with one remaining son, Lord Bardsley who is 11. Lord Danvers, a solitary man with a tendency to melancholy, gives William the job of secretary and reveals his extraordinary history. Richard dislikes his status and financial prospects as a younger son whose brother, Arthur, will inherit the earldom from their cousin, Robert. When Arthur unexpectedly dies in a duel in Austria and his wife, Irene, dies shortly after giving birth, Richard hides the identity of his infant nephew. Arthur's servant, Cloudesley, brings up the boy in Italy and marries the servant of the boy's mother, Eudocia. They call him Julian Cloudesley. Richard returns to England and marries Selina and they have four children. All but one of them die at the age of eleven, and Selina dies. Cloudesley tries to convince Richard that he should reveal his secret and restore the boy to his position and entitlements, but Richard refuses. Eudocia dies, and Cloudesley goes to Britain to confront Richard, but when he is away Cloudesley's friend, Borromeo, with whom he has left the 18-year-old Julian, writes to say that Julian has gone missing. Julian found it difficult to live with Borromeo, a blue beard character, and left to join his friends in the countryside whom he does not know belong to a group of bandits. Cloudesley is shot by one of the bandits, Francesco, and his secret about Julian's birth is left with his misanthropic friend, Borromeo. Robert dies, making Richard Baron Alton and Earl Danvers. Having formed a close bond with the chief bandit, St. Elmo, Julian returns to them. Borromeo writers to Lord Danvers to tell him of Cloudesley's death and of Julian's disappearance. Danvers sends Meadows to find Julian, who is now 21. Julian is about to be executed with the rest of the bandits. Meadows asks the consul-general to intervene, but he is only prevailed upon to do so when Lord Danvers arrives to confess his guilt. Danvers is dangerously ill and has recently lost his last child. St. Elmo, Francesco, and the rest of the gang are executed and Julian is released. Lord Danvers is buried according to his wishes in an unmarked grave in Naples. Witnesses are produced in England to corroborate the truth of Julian's birth for the English courts, and Meadows writes to Borromeo to inform him of what has happened. Borromeo learns that “The true key of the universe is love” (289). He renounces his misanthropy and proclaims that the most important human trait is “disinterested affection” (289).

== Themes ==
According to the literary scholar Graham Allen, "Cloudesley is a story of deceit and usurpation, fraud and prolonged guilt; but, far more importantly, it is the story of how a man raises himself from crime to transcend not only his own past but the apparently inexorable laws of blood-relations and class divisions." He argues that Cloudesley "is the greatest example of a theme frequently returned to in Godwin’s work, a theme obviously close to his heart: the ability of human beings to transcend the apparent logic of consanguinity and to form parental and filial relations with those to whom they are not related by blood."

== Bibliography ==
- Allen, Graham. "Cloudesley; A Tale". The Literary Encyclopedia. 27 September 2004. Retrieved on 22 April 2008.
- Godwin, William. The Collected Novels and Memoirs of William Godwin. Cloudesley. Vol. 7. Ed. Maurice Hindle. London: William Pickering, 1992.
