= Fleetwood (novel) =

Novel by William Godwin

Fleetwood (1805) (sub-titled: Or, The New Man of Feeling) is a novel by William Godwin. Like his two previous novels, it is an eponymous tale (the title of the novel is the same as the name of the hero).

More than either Caleb Williams or St. Leon, however, Fleetwood is intended as a criticism of Jean-Jacques Rousseau and his ideas about the virtue of natural man. Like Emile, the protagonist of Rousseau's treatise on education, Fleetwood is raised in the supposedly ideal world of nature. However, what is ideal for Rousseau turns out to be problematic in Fleetwood.

The novel, in a bildungsroman style, follows the problematic consequences of the hero's natural education.

== Plot ==
Casimir Fleetwood lives in Merionethshire, North Wales, on a large estate near Cader Idris in the early to mid-eighteenth century and is brought up as an only child. While on the grand tour, he visits his father's old friend, Monsieur Ruffigny, in Switzerland, who is a thinly disguised portrait of Rousseau. While he is there, his father dies, and Ruffigny decides to accompany Casimir back to Wales and tells the story of his life and how he became friends with Casimir's father during the journey. At 45 years old, he marries Mary Macneil, whose family have all died in a shipwreck. Casimir finds it difficult to adjust to married life and his wife is much younger. He invites his distant cousins, Kenrick and Gifford. Casimir is unaware that Gifford's aim is to discredit his brother, and to become Casimir's heir. Mary becomes pregnant by the time the men come to stay, but Casimir imagines she is having an affair with Kenrick, prompted by Gifford's insinuations. Casimir frequently alludes to Othello in his account of this affair. After acting as a go-between for Kenrick and her friend, Louisa Scarborough, Mary is accused of adultery and is divorced by her husband, who goes to France. Kenrick and Casimir arranges to meet Gifford in Paris. As he approaches the city, however, Casimir is set upon by men who drag him from his carriage. Louisa's father arrives, denounces Gifford and reveals that Kenrick rescued Casimir from the attackers and Gifford was the shooter.

Scarborough has proof that Kenrick and Mary are innocent. Casmir forgives Kenrick and is introduced to his baby son. He makes a will, giving his wife his possessions, Kenrick an estate worth £18,000, and says he plans to live in the Pyrenees on £400 a year. Mary arrives and they are reconciled. Gifford is executed in France as a highwayman and a swindler. Kenrick and Louisa marry.

== Sources ==
- Godwin, William. Fleetwood: Or, The New Man of Feeling. Ed. Gary Handwerk and A. A. Markley. Peterborough, Ontario: Broadview, 2001.
