= Jane Austen's House Museum =

Historic house museum in Hampshire, England

Coordinates: 51.1331°N 0.9890°W

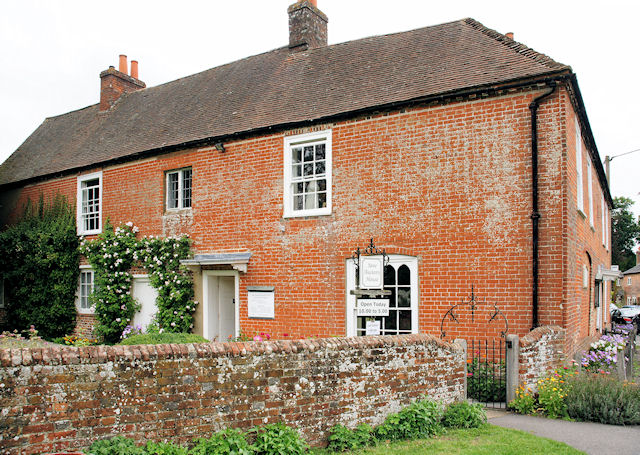
Jane Austen's House in Chawton

Jane Austen's House is a small independent museum in the village of Chawton near Alton in Hampshire. It is a writer's house museum occupying the 17th-century house (informally known as Chawton Cottage) in which novelist Jane Austen spent the last eight years of her life, during which time she wrote, revised and made ready to be published all six of her novels, and the fragment Sanditon. The museum has been a Grade I listed building since 1963.

== Jane Austen residence ==
Previously home to local farmers, the house was briefly a public house, The New Inn, between 1781 and 1787. The pub was the site of two murders, and after the second murder the house was let by Jane Austen's brother, Edward Austen Knight, to his bailiff, Bridger Seward.

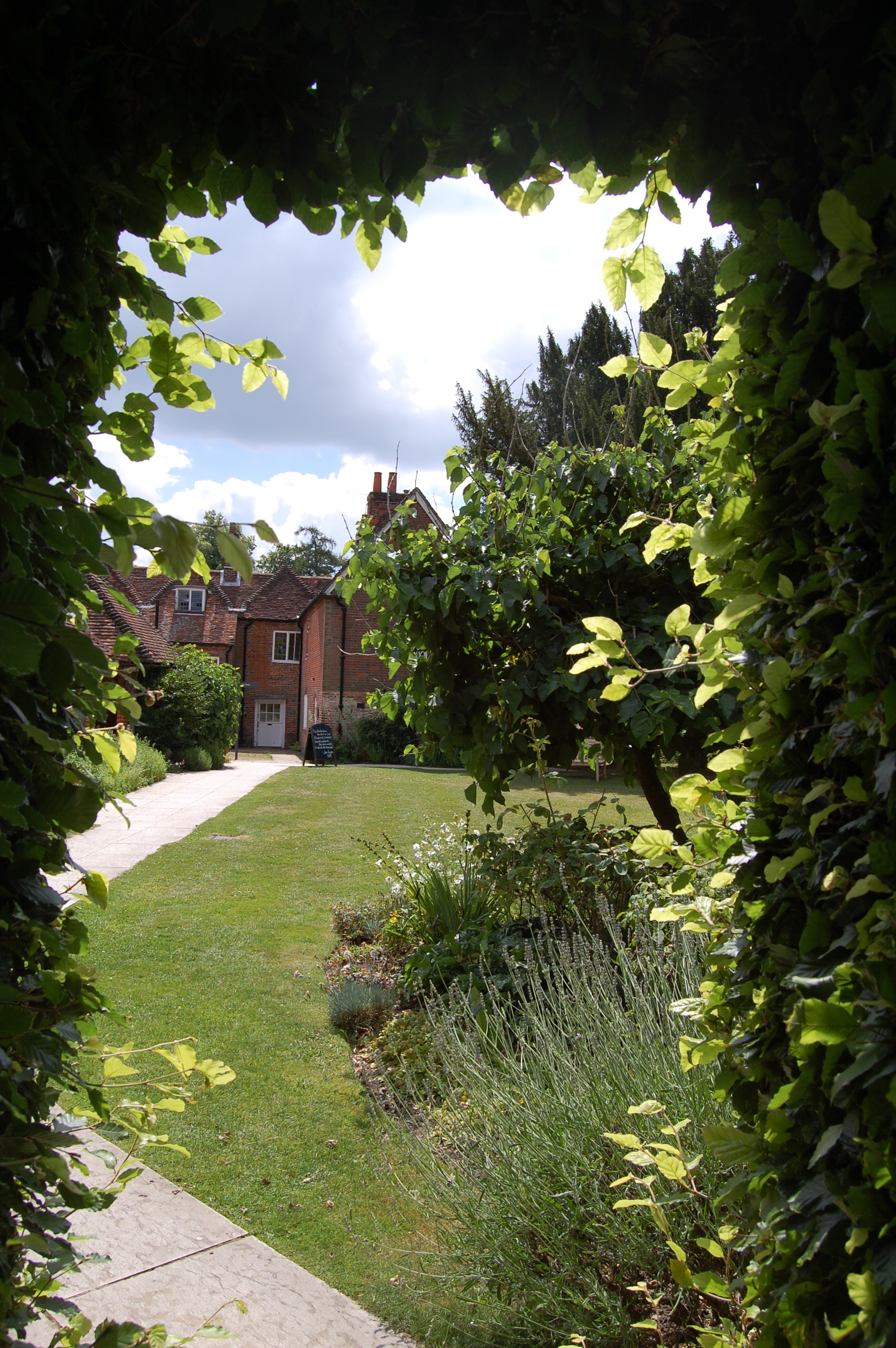
View

Later, Edward Austen Knight allowed his mother and sisters to live in the house so they had a permanent residence. Jane Austen lived in the house with her mother, her sister Cassandra and a longtime family friend Martha Lloyd from 7 July 1809 until May 1817, when because of illness she moved to Winchester to be near her physician. She died in Winchester on 18 July 1817. Her mother and sister continued to live in the house until their deaths in 1827 and 1845 respectively.

When she arrived at Chawton, Jane Austen had written three novels in draft form; these were Sense and Sensibility, Pride and Prejudice and Northanger Abbey. She revised these novels at the house before getting them published. In addition, it was here that she wrote Mansfield Park, Emma and Persuasion.

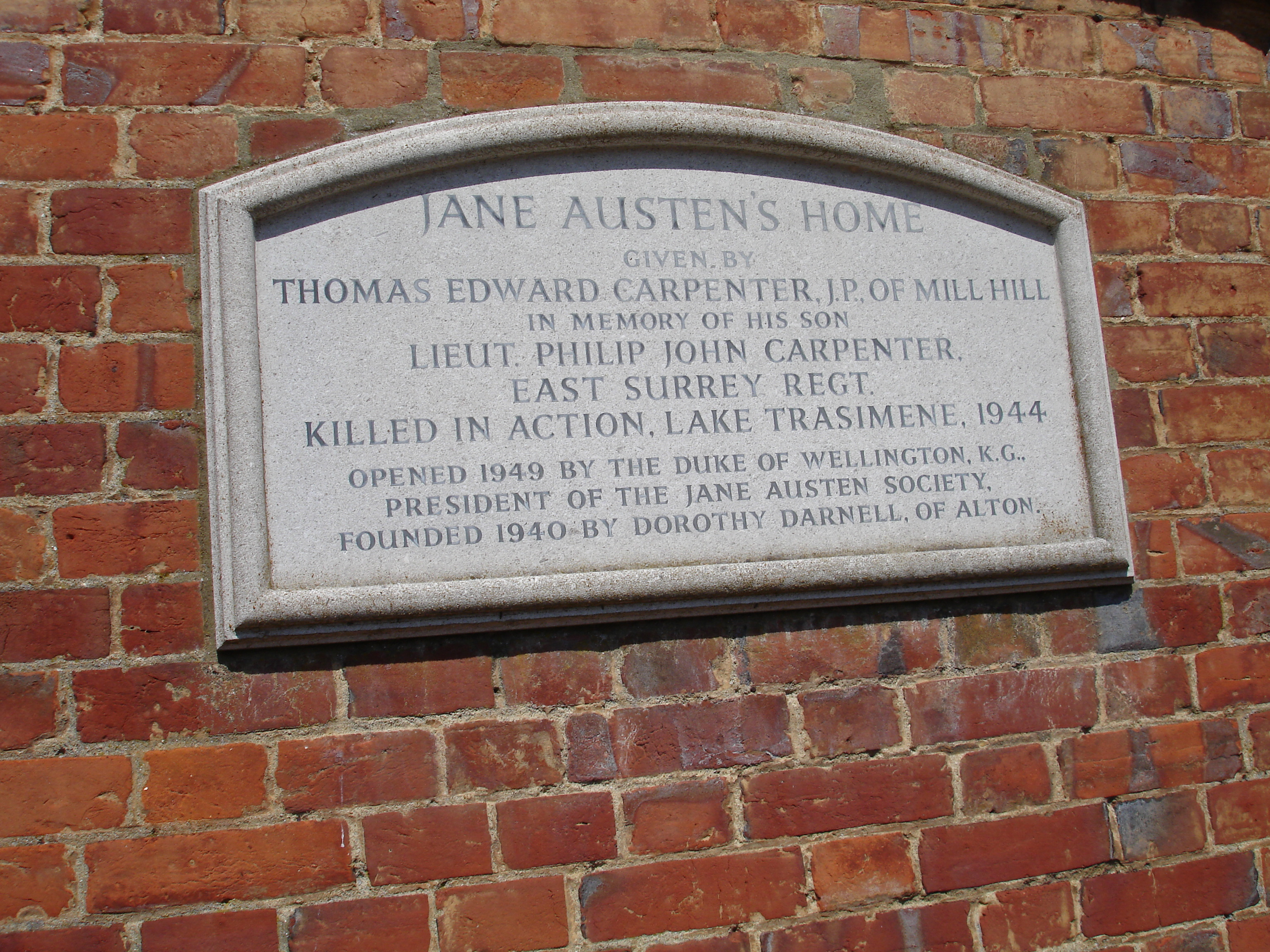
Inscription on Jane Austen's House

== Museum ==
Following Cassandra's death, the house was divided into small apartments for labourers, before part of the building became a workman's club by the beginning of the twentieth century. The remainder of the house was split into cottages for estate workers and had been known as Petty Johns and Chawton Cottage.

Jane Austen's House Museum was established in 1947 and until 2014 it was governed by the Jane Austen Memorial Trust. The house was sold by Edward Knight to Thomas Edward Carpenter for £3,000 in 1948 (£94,310 as of 2025). The house was given in trust in 1949 in memory of Carpenter's son, Lieutenant Philip John Carpenter, of the 1st Battalion East Surrey Regiment, 'who fell whilst leading his men at Trasimene, Italy, the 30th day of June 1944, aged 22'.

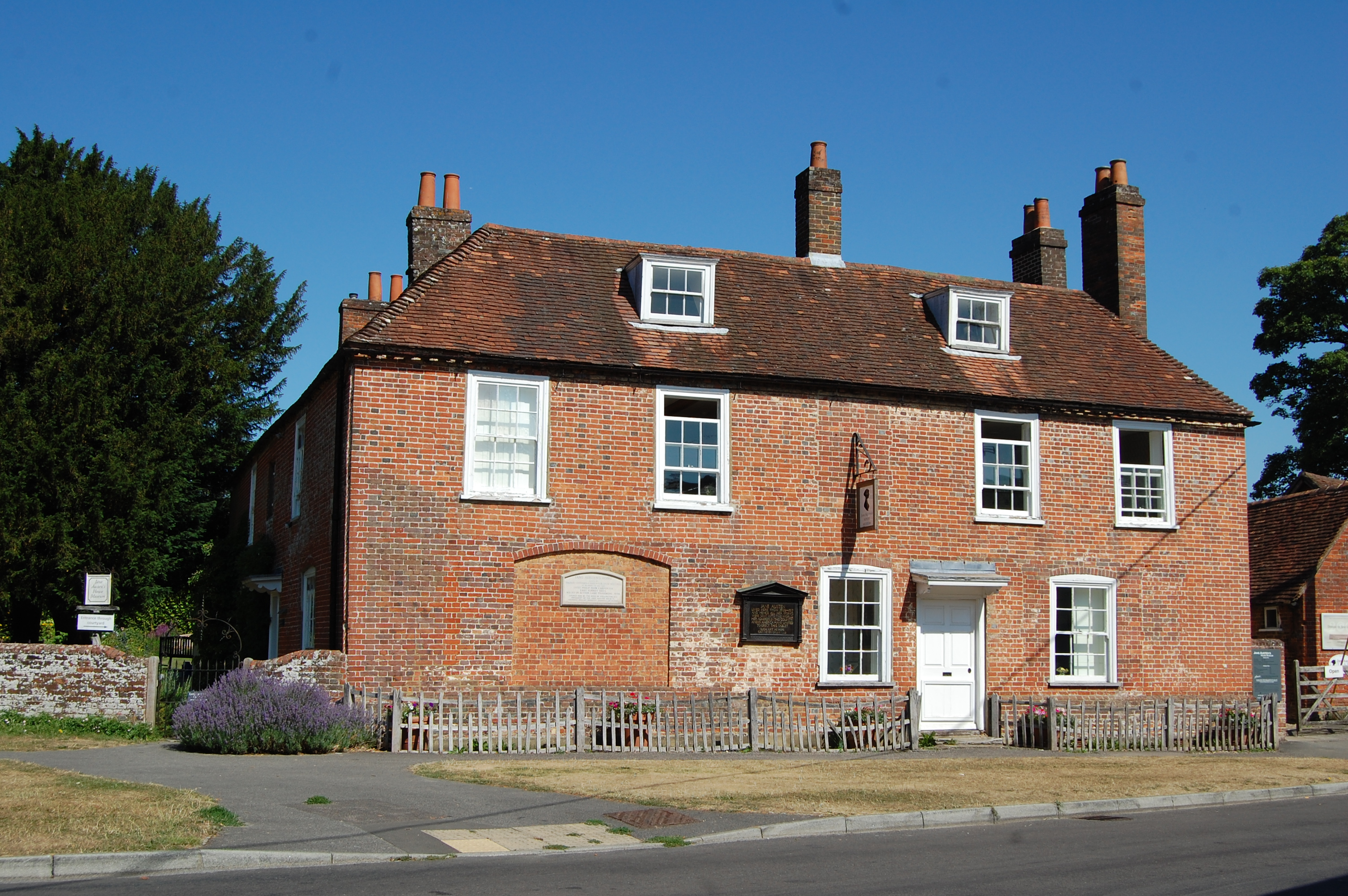

The museum opened to the public in July 1949 and is visited by approximately 40,000 people each year. It is now owned and run by the Jane Austen's House Museum CIO, a registered charity which has as its objects "the advancement of education and in particular the study of English literature, especially the works of Jane Austen."(registered number: 1156458)

The Museum's collection includes eighteen music books owned by Jane Austen, with pieces transcribed in her own hand. In addition, among the items of furniture on display at the museum are a Muzio Clementi pianoforte (dated 1813) similar to the piano she owned, and a Hepplewhite bureau-bookcase containing several of her works. The museum also has a collection of other Austen family items and furniture.

The museum owns the only three pieces of jewellery known to have been owned by Austen, a turquoise beaded bracelet, a topaz cross, and a turquoise and gold ring. The gold ring had remained in Austen's family until its 2012 sale at auction to the American singer Kelly Clarkson. The British government placed an export ban on the ring owing to its historic importance, and the museum eventually bought the ring by the export deadline, with the help of £100,000 from an anonymous donor. The ring was placed on display at the museum in February 2014.

Regular events are held at the museum, both to further appreciation of Jane Austen, and to encourage new writers. There are also recitals using the Clementi pianoforte and performances based on her works.

== See also ==
- Chawton House
- Jane Austen Centre, Bath
- Timeline of Jane Austen
