= St. Leon (novel) =

1799 novel by William Godwin

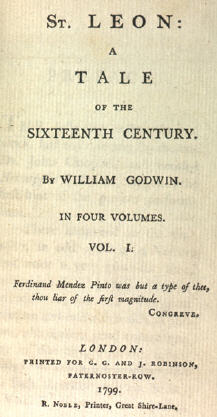
Title page from the first edition of St. Leon

St. Leon: A Tale of the Sixteenth Century (1799) is eighteenth-century British philosopher William Godwin's fourth novel.

Following the success of Things as They Are; or, The Adventures of Caleb Williams (1794), Godwin searched for a topic that would capture his imagination as much as his earlier work. St. Leon is the tale of a French aristocrat, Count Reginald de St. Leon, who loses his wealth gambling and experiences guilt that drives him almost to madness. He accepts the secret of the elixir of life and of the power of multiplying wealth from a dying stranger, ultimately causing him to wander separated from humankind.

== Plot ==
Count Reginald narrates the story of his life, beginning with the death of his father when he was an infant. He was brought up by his mother, "a woman of rather a masculine understanding, and full of the prejudices of nobility and magnificence."

Reginald has grand notions of aristocratic honour, and, inspired by his uncle, the Marquis de Villeroy, he joins the Italian war of 1521–6, hoping to achieve military renown in the battle of Pavia. Reginald is knighted by King Francis I, while fighting for the French against the Spanish Imperial army, but the King is captured and imprisoned by Charles V. The King's exile changes the climate in France from one in which "the activity of the field" is exchanged "for the indulgences of the table."

On his return home, Reginald, now twenty years old is forced by the death of his mother to take charge of his own affairs. He is quickly led astray by a life of spending too much, keeping mistresses, and gambling. He lives like this for two years and quickly depletes his fortune. He meets the beautiful and accomplished nineteen-year-old Marguerite Louise Isabeau de Damville, whose education has benefited from the society of Clement Marot, Rabelais, Erasmus, and Scaliger, and whose drawing has been encouraged by Leonardo da Vinci. Reginald courts Marguerite, who is the daughter of the Marquis de Damville, but Reginald's reputation as a gambler causes the Marquis to warn him that he should be careful not to ruin himself and his daughter. The Marquis allows them to marry, but by the time he is in his thirties, Reginald is living beyond his means and has returned to gambling. The Marquis does not live to see this development.

Marguerite moves their family to Switzerland and pays off her husband's debts by selling their possessions. She tries to convince him that the simpler life of a peasant will make the whole family happier and more virtuous. However, while they are beginning their farming life, their crops and animals are unexpectedly destroyed in a fierce storm. Disturbed by the sight of a dead woman and child, Reginald realizes he is fortunate when he returns home to find his family is safe. He dismisses his former love of money and rank. Seeing the casualties of a fierce storm reveals to him that his new life as a subsistence farmer is more valuable than he imagined, but that it is a life subject to the precarious whims of fortune. This development gives Godwin scope to expatiate on the Swiss system of storing corn in public reserves in case of natural disasters.

Reginald applies for national relief and a disbursement from the public treasury to enable him to restock his farm. But relief is refused on the grounds that he is not Swiss. Government officials are sent to remove the family from the country altogether without giving them time to sell their cottage. A compassionate neighbour lends them money against the house and they leave for Lake Constance. The neighbour dies, and his estate passes to a relative, Monsieur Grimseld, who steals their house. Reginald risks imprisonment to return to Switzerland to reclaim his cottage as his family are beginning to starve. Grimseld is fined for fraud, and Reginald is given the money for his farm.

Volume 2 begins in the year 1544. An old man arrives at the family's house at Lake Constance, claiming to be a Venetian called Francesco Zampieri, but his true identity remains a mystery. He is being pursued by the Inquisition. Zampieri reveals to Reginald the secret of immortality and the art of multiplying gold. Only one person is permitted to know these secrets at any one time. The secret of immortality is an elixir made from herbs that when consumed bring youth and vigour. It cures sickness, but cannot save anyone from injury. Reluctant to keep a secret from his wife, Reginald is forced to remain silent about the gift and Zampieri dies shortly afterwards.

Francis I returns to France from his imprisonment in Spain, finding the country in a great upheaval, with Charles V and Henry VIII in the process of invading northern France. Unwilling to return to his simple domestic life, Reginald plans to repurchase the estate that he lost, but in order to make it seem like he has regained his wealth gradually and not in suspicious circumstances, he moves to the city of Constance and pretends that Zampieri had given him 3,000 crowns. Constance is in the process of becoming Protestant.

Reginald is quickly seduced into spending a great deal of money and arouses the suspicion of his countryman, Gaspard de Coligny. Reginald's son, Charles, becomes aware of the shame that wealth with an inexplicable origin has brought and disowns his father and leaves. Marguerite is also suspicious and guesses that he has found the philosopher's stone. Reginald tells her not to reveal this and not to enquire further about it. She is ill, but as the elixir can only be drunk by an "adept", he cannot give it to her.

The suspicions about Reginald's wealth grow to such a height that the magistrate has him arrested and questioned. He is asked about the disappearance of the stranger and about his new wealth, but refuses to cooperate. Monsieur Monluc, a Frenchman, arrives, and Reginald appeals to him for help. Monluc investigates the case, interviews Marguerite. Reginald tells him the honorable name of St. Leon which removes the necessity for an explanation and he does not provide a reason. Monluc refuses to help him further.

Marguerite advises Reginald to escape from the prison. He attempts to bribe a turnkey, Hector, but he refuses to help because he is loyal to the keeper and he reveals this to the keeper. The keeper asks for a bribe. Reginald hands over a large sum but is led to a dungeon instead and chained to a wall. Hector is imprisoned because he is the only person who knows about the bribe. The keeper asks for more money, and Reginald is forced to trust him, and this time he is released provided he takes Hector with him in order to make the latter appear to be an accomplice.

In volume 3, Reginald, his family, and Hector set out for Italy. One evening, while Hector and Reginald are taking an evening walk while the family are at an inn in the Alps, Reginald hears a man shrieking and is attacked by a large black dog. The dog takes him to a man who is wounded and dying. Reginald and Hector dress his wounds, and Hector runs back to the inn to get help.

The man's name is Andrea Filosanto. He had been taking his mother's dower to her and was robbed. He dies, and the dog grieves for him. Reginald takes the dog, Charon, into his family. A few months later, the dog finds the assailant, who is apprehended, confesses to being one of the robbers, is tried, convicted, and executed.

Reginald settles in Pisa, and is protected by the Filosanto family and the family of the woman Andrea was about to marry, the Carracciuoli, who are powerful in the Pisan territory. Reginald spends some time practicing alchemy in a grotto, employing Hector as an assistant. Hector tells his girlfriend about the experiments, and Reginald quickly gains the reputation of being a sorcerer. His girlfriend's other lover, Agostino, is jealous and seeks revenge.

Reginald is shunned, and someone shoots at their house at night. The dog is killed, and Hector is attacked. The attack is motivated by the suspicions about magic and by Hector's being of African origin. Reginald addresses the mob in an attempt to vindicate himself, but they throw mud at him and accuse him of witchcraft.

He leaves to consult with the Marchese Filosanto, and the rest of the family leave for Lucca, heading for Spain. They leave Hector in charge of their house in Pisa. When Reginald goes back to Pisa, he finds that the mob have burned his house down, that Hector has gone mad and has escaped his carers and has died defending the house. Hector was tortured by the mob, and it is clear that the crime is racially motivated.

Marguerite has a miscarriage in Lucca. The family continue to Spain, and Marguerite dies in Barcelona. Distraught, the family continues to Madrid. Here, the daughters are looked after by Mariana, a former companion of their mother's. Reginald repurchases his family's French estate, and he gradually separates himself from his children, considering this to be a virtuous action. They are told to think and speak of him as if he were dead. The family still do not know the whereabouts of Charles.

Reginald moves to Madrid and spends time studying natural philosophy and ethics. He is followed by two men, who are eventually revealed to be informers for the Inquisition. He is arrested and imprisoned for sorcery. Philip II returns to Spain after his marriage to Queen Mary, and he oversees an auto da Fé in Seville. Philip then travels to Valladolid for another auto da Fé, at which Reginald is to be burned alive. The elixir of life cannot protect him from this punishment.

While processing to Valladolid from Madrid, a horse is frightened and kicks, and in the confusion, Reginald escapes and breaks into the house of a Jewish convert to Christianity, Mordecai. Just as he had appealed to the turnkey as a member of an oppressed minority, so Reginald appeals to Mordecai to help him escape the Inquisition. Mordecai helps him change his clothes and fetches the herbs needed for the elixir of immortality. Reginald now has visibly aged such that he looks like a man of eighty. He drinks the elixir and becomes as young and healthy as he was on his wedding day. He leaves without Mordecai's knowledge. During his escape, Reginald accidentally witnesses the auto da fé and is horrified.

At the beginning of volume 4, Reginald visits his daughters disguised as an Armenian merchant. He has now been away from them for twelve years. Louisa is 28, Marguerite (named after her mother) is 24, and Julia died four years previously after her fiancé had been imprisoned by his father for intending to marry her. Reginald pretends to have known their father and informs them of his own death. He hopes that the death certificate that he gives them will remove the dishonour from his family.

Reginald leaves for Hungary and takes a house in Buda, intending to use his money to revitalize the economy after the devastation of a long war. He gives charity to poor people, becomes a corn dealer and an architect, and takes a new name: "the sieur de Chatillon" (p. 366). Problems occur, however, when demand for corn becomes too great and the people suspect him of manipulating the market for personal gain.

Reginald presents himself to the Turkish Pasha of Buda, Muzaffer Bey. But Bey blames him for causing civil unrest and investigates the unknown origins of Reginald's wealth. Reginald is forced to bribe him. He then meets Bethlem Gabor, a misanthropic arms dealer, and a native of Hungary, whose wife and children have been murdered. Like Reginald, Bethlem spends a great deal of time wandering, and they share their sorrows and become friends.

The civil unrest eases as the crops that Reginald has ordered to be sown are ripening and are being successfully protected by soldiers. Three months have passed since Reginald first became acquainted with Bethlem. After expecting to meet him while travelling, Reginald is captured by Austro-Hungarian freebooters. He escapes and finds Bethlem, but without warning, Bethlem takes him to one of his castles and puts him in the dungeon. Reginald is left without food for thirty-six hours, and then he is given food and chained to a wall.

Bethlem gives as his reason for his hostility: that Reginald had helped an enemy of his, unknowingly, and that although he and Reginald had suffered the same loss of their families, Reginald had reacted to it by being kind to a great number of people and Bethlem had done the reverse. Bethlem feels shamed by this. Reginald tries to pay Bethlem to let him go, and requests a chest from his house. Bethlem opens the chest and discovers that it contains alchemical equipment. He demands gold, making it clear that he intends to keep Reginald locked up forever in order to supply it.

In the dungeon Reginald dreams that he is rescued by a knight in armour, who turns into a female angel, and that they fly away together leaving the castle in flames. Something close to this vision comes true. Bethlem visits Reginald's cell to tell him that the castle is under siege, and that he is experiencing remorse for keeping him captive. Bethlem gives Reginald the means to escape, making him promise not to do so for twenty-four hours. Reginald waits six hours, justifying his inability to keep his promise with the argument that it was extorted under duress. He spends two hours trying to get out of the caverns, but finds that the aids he left on the walls on his way in are no longer helpful.

A loud shout startles him, and Reginald concludes that he is near the outside. But a large amount of smoke convinces him to wait before he attempts to leave, so he returns to the dungeons, risking suffocation. He hides in a different cell from the one to which he was confined in case Bethlem returns. Eventually, Reginald leaves the castle in ruins and approaches some soldiers. He immediately recognizes his son Charles, who has changed his surname to de Damville. Charles is now thirty-two. Ruminating over what has happened, Reginald cannot account for Bethlem's hostile actions or his remorse and he forgives him. Charles does not recognize his father, who appears to be twenty-two, even though the other soldiers notice their similarity.

Intending not to disgrace his son, Reginald adopts the name Henry d'Aubigny. Charles and Reginald quickly become friends, and Charles reveals his history. He is fighting the Turks, and prefers not to fight in the wars between Protestants and Catholics. He is also in search of Chatillon because of his known friendship with Bethlem Gabor. Reginald does not reveal that he is Chatillon. Charles recounts that he fought with General Castaldo in the battle of Muhlberg in 1547, whom he served for seven years. He recalls the siege of Erlau (Eger, Hungary) and notes the bravery of the women of the city, and the siege of Ziget (Sisak in Croatia). Ziget was governed by Horvati, a Christian, and was besieged by the Turkish Pasha of Buda.

The Pasha lost the siege and died of grief and mortification. While Reginald sympathizes a great deal with his son and is proud of his achievements, he regards his role as a Christian warrior as religious fanaticism. Charles has fallen in love with Pandora, the niece of the palatine of Hungary, Nadasti, whom he first met when she was fourteen. Pandora's father died in the siege of Ziget, leaving her a poor orphan and Nadasti prefers Charles to marry one of his own daughters. Charles realizes that he cannot support a wife on his pay, and he needs the uncle's consent. Reginald sees Pandora and is struck by her beauty, good sense and naturalness. He is determined to use his wealth to enable them to marry, but needs to find a way to make it seem appropriate. Reginald discovers that Pandora's mother had been a Venetian, and that her mother's uncle sailed with the Spanish explorer Francisco Pizarro to conquer Peru. Her uncle having died during the mission, he did not receive a portion of the treasure. Pandora being his sole surviving relative would have inherited this treasure.

Reginald finds, by chance, a man who had sailed on the same ship, Benedetto Cabriera, who has lost all of his money due to a series of calamities. Reginald pays him to pretend that Pandora's uncle had received his share, and that it had been bequeathed to her. While waiting for Benedetto to appear with the money in Hungary, Reginald learns that Charles has rejected Pandora because he thinks, incorrectly, that she is in love with Reginald and is an ‘unfeeling coquette’. Pandora explains to Reginald that they must no longer see each other, and is interrupted by Charles's arrival, faints and is caught by Reginald increasing Charles's suspicions. Charles remonstrates with them both and leaves them speechless.

Reginald yearns to tell his son the truth about his identity and learns his greatest lesson about solitude: more than a dungeon, solitude is alienation from your child. Reginald leaves for Presburg and meets Charles, who is on his way to accompany Mary, Queen of Scots back to her native land. Charles confronts his father with a letter from Andrew, Count of Bathori, accusing Reginald of being Chatillon and an alchemist. He tells Reginald that he lost his father to alchemy and challenges Reginald to a duel. Reginald agrees, but leaves Presburg before the appointed time.

Charles and Pandora are reconciled, and the remainder of Reginald's story is devoted to tracing the development of Charles's virtues and to expressing his own regret at realizing the importance of his family too late.

== Themes ==
The novel explores the themes of immortality, the domestic affections (love and friendship), honour, and religion. Into a historical novel of vast range and violence Godwin melds elements of the domestic novel, the philosophical novel, and fantasy. More so than the earlier Caleb Williams, this novel tests Godwin's philosophical premises, showing the tensions between the aspiration to greatness and family affections and the disintegration of effective social responsibility.

=== Money ===
The novel deals with a range of issues connected with wealth. Firstly, it moralizes against gambling, viewing it as a waste of resources and a drain on the time of people who could be doing something more useful with their wealth. Secondly, it traces the effects of poverty, suggesting that there is a nobility in the simple life. While the peasant life is favoured, the novel emphasizes that education is also important, and so the aristocratic family who are living in reduced circumstances have the benefit of having developed their minds and of living in a way that does not oppress anyone. Thirdly, the novel reflects on the power of wealth. The ideas expressed in the novel follow those of Godwin's Enquiry Concerning Political Justice and its Influence on Modern Morals and Manners (1793). Reginald reflects that "[w]eakness and want are the parents of vice". When Reginald is finally in a position to put his new ability to multiply gold to good use, he secures the future of his daughters, and then travels to Buda to help stimulate the post-war economy with a building program. When he finds his son Charles, he is able to give his intended wife a dowry without them knowing it. Wherever Reginald goes, he confronts problems with appearing to have excessive wealth that comes from no discernible origin. Here Godwin addresses the topic of the surveillance society, the problem of secrecy, and the traditional motif of cursed gold.

=== Liberty and intolerance ===
The novel asks the questions: what do we need in order to be truly free? And what is oppression? Reginald's lost money may appear to him to be a disaster, but his wife, Marguerite, philosophizes that its loss makes them less able to oppress people by engaging them as servants, and it makes them more free themselves. She argues that people who are educated and live the life of a peasant are the happiest because they do not reduce the people below them “to a state of servitude” and in turn become themselves enslaved to their own homes and lifestyle. Intolerance is further explored through the persecutions of the Inquisition. Both the stranger who gives Reginald the secrets and Reginald himself are pursued by the Inquisition for sorcery. At several points in the narrative, Godwin expatiates on the power and unthinking qualities of mob-like behavior. He also explores racial intolerance through the torture and murder of Hector, the African servant, and the fear expressed by Mordechai, the Spanish convert from Judaism to Christianity. Reginald appeals to both for help on the grounds that they have experienced the same kind of oppression as him. Godwin also devotes a great deal of time to exploring the difficulties of immigrants and refugees. The St. Leon family is displaced several times, and they learn that the "prepossessions of mankind are clearly unfavourable to a newcomer, an emigrant who has quitted his former connections and the scenes of his youth. They are unavoidably impelled to believe, that his taking up his abode in another country must be owing to a weak and discreditable caprice, if it be not owing to something still more disadvantageous in his character."

=== Honour and merit ===
Honour and merit are central themes in Caleb Williams. Again, Godwin pits aristocratic reputation against intrinsic merit. Like Falkland, in Caleb Williams, Reginald has been brought up to think of himself as worthy of admiration and homage. He learns that the "value of a man is in his intrinsic qualities" and that honour is not inherited, it must be earned and displayed in one's actions. While Godwin associates aristocratic honour with vanity and ostentation, there remains in the novel a sense in which honourable behaviour is valued insofar as it signals loyalty, equitable action, and acting in an open manner.

=== Gender ===
To some extent the novel preserves traditional ideas about the differences between men and women. Women are commended for their beauty and men for their bravery. Marguerite, however, is presented as an exceptional woman in that she is unusually brave, rational, and independent. Marguerite suggests that as a wife she should be "a human being and an equal" and that this means that they should be open with each other. In accordance with Godwin's views in Political Justice, Reginald attacks what he regards as effeminacy in men, and in particular, men who are inactive or who are emotional or cowardly. Zampieri, the stranger, criticizes Reginald for arguing that he could not keep a secret from his wife, calling him "[f]eeble and effeminate" and "the puppet of a woman". Reginald agrees to keep the secret, but still holds that his wife and he are two halves of one soul and rightly fears that the secret will lead to an emotional separation.

== Influence ==
St. Leon influenced the Gothic novel St. Irvyne; or, The Rosicrucian (1811) by Godwin's future son-in-law Percy Bysshe Shelley, and Frankenstein (1818), which was dedicated to Godwin, and written by his daughter Mary Shelley.

St. Leon further inspired J.D. Burk's play Bethlem Gabor, Lord of Transylvania, or, The Man Hating Palatine: an Historical Drama (1807). The Reverend John Hobart Caunter, a friend of Godwin's, (Note: Social calls from and to Caunter are recorded in Godwin's diary mostly from late 1830 to a week before Godwin's death in 1836, and Caunter attended Godwin's funeral.) also wrote a play inspired by the novel, St. Leon: A Drama. In Three Acts (1835).
