= Lives of the Necromancers =

19th-century book by William Godwin

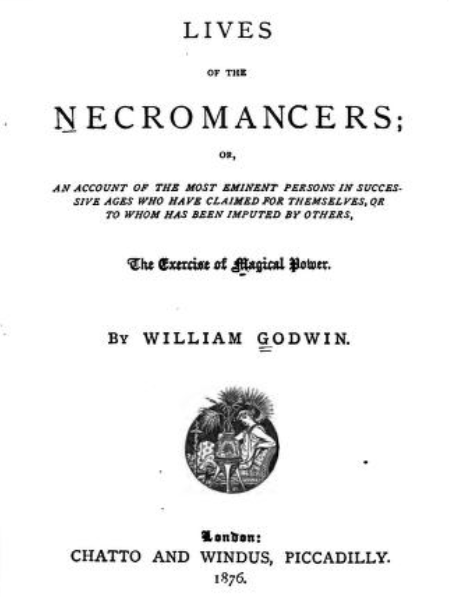
- Title page for Lives of the necromancers or An account of the most eminent persons in successive ages who have claimed for themselves or to whom has been imputed by others the exercise of magical powers (1876 edition)
- Author: William Godwin
- Language: English
- Subject: Magicians
- Published: 1834
- Publication place: United States
- Media type: Print
- ISBN: 1153638215
- OCLC: 606221214

Lives of the necromancers or An account of the most eminent persons in successive ages who have claimed for themselves or to whom has been imputed by others the exercise of magical powers (1834) was the final book written by English journalist, political philosopher and novelist William Godwin. The book concerns paranormal legends from western and Middle Eastern history. In 1835 it was reviewed by Edgar Allan Poe of the Southern Literary Messenger.

== Content ==
The book begins with an introduction that explains the ways in which superstitions and other mythical beliefs could have originated during the Middle Ages, before the Scientific Revolution. The first chapter is entitled "Ambitious Nature of Man" and briefly explains many concepts including divination, chiromancy, interpretations of dreams, casting of lots, fairies, Rosicrucianism, oracles and necromancy.

The second chapter gives examples of necromancy and witchcraft from the Bible, such as the Pharaoh's dream of the seven years of plenty, and seven years of famine which could not be interpreted by "all the magicians of Egypt and all the wise men."

The third chapter covers the Greeks, their deities, demigods, the argonauts, and even tales of the idiosyncrasies of Pythagoras and Socrates. He claims of the latter "that he repeatedly received a divine premonition of dangers impending over himself and others."

The fourth chapter covers Rome and includes discussions about Virgil and Romulus, among others.

The fifth chapter is about the casting out of devils in the Christian religion and the mentioning of sorcery in the New Testament. He discusses Simon Magus, Nero, and Elymas the sorcerer, amongst others.

The sixth chapter flows from the fifth in that it covers the changes that took place under Constantine which affected necromancy and witchcraft.

The seventh chapter covers the history of necromancy in the East and mentions Arabian nights and Persian tales, amongst others.

The eighth chapter covers the Dark Ages in Europe and mentions Merlin and St. Dunstan.

The ninth chapter looks at Europe and the Saracens and mentions Pope Benedict IX and Pope Gregory VII, as well as Macbeth, King of Scotland, Virgil, Roger Bacon, and Thomas Aquinas amongst others.

The tenth chapter is entitled "Revival of Letters" and mentions Joan of Arc, Richard III and Eleanor Cobham.

The eleventh chapter is entitled "Sanguinary Proceedings Against Witchcraft" and covers the persecution of suspected witches. Dr Faustus, Luther, Cornelius Agrippa and Nostradamus are amongst the people mentioned. Witches in Sweden, New England and the Lancashire witches are specifically discussed.

The conclusion mentions some laws that were passed in various parts of the world to remove the punishment of witchcraft, such as the 1736 English statute that stated "no capital prosecution should for the future take place for conjuration, sorcery and enchantment, but restricting the punishment of persons pretending to tell fortunes and discover stolen goods by witchcraft, to that appertaining to a misdemeanour."

== Reception ==
In his 1835 review of this work, Edgar Allan Poe was full of praise. He opined that the author showed "an air of mature thought — of deliberate premeditation ... [which is] in him a grace inestimable". He praises the way in which the book displays "the great range and wild extravagancy of the imagination of man", and he concludes that "his compilation is an invaluable work, evincing much labor and research, and full of absorbing interest."
