= William Godwin =

English philosopher and novelist (1756–1836)

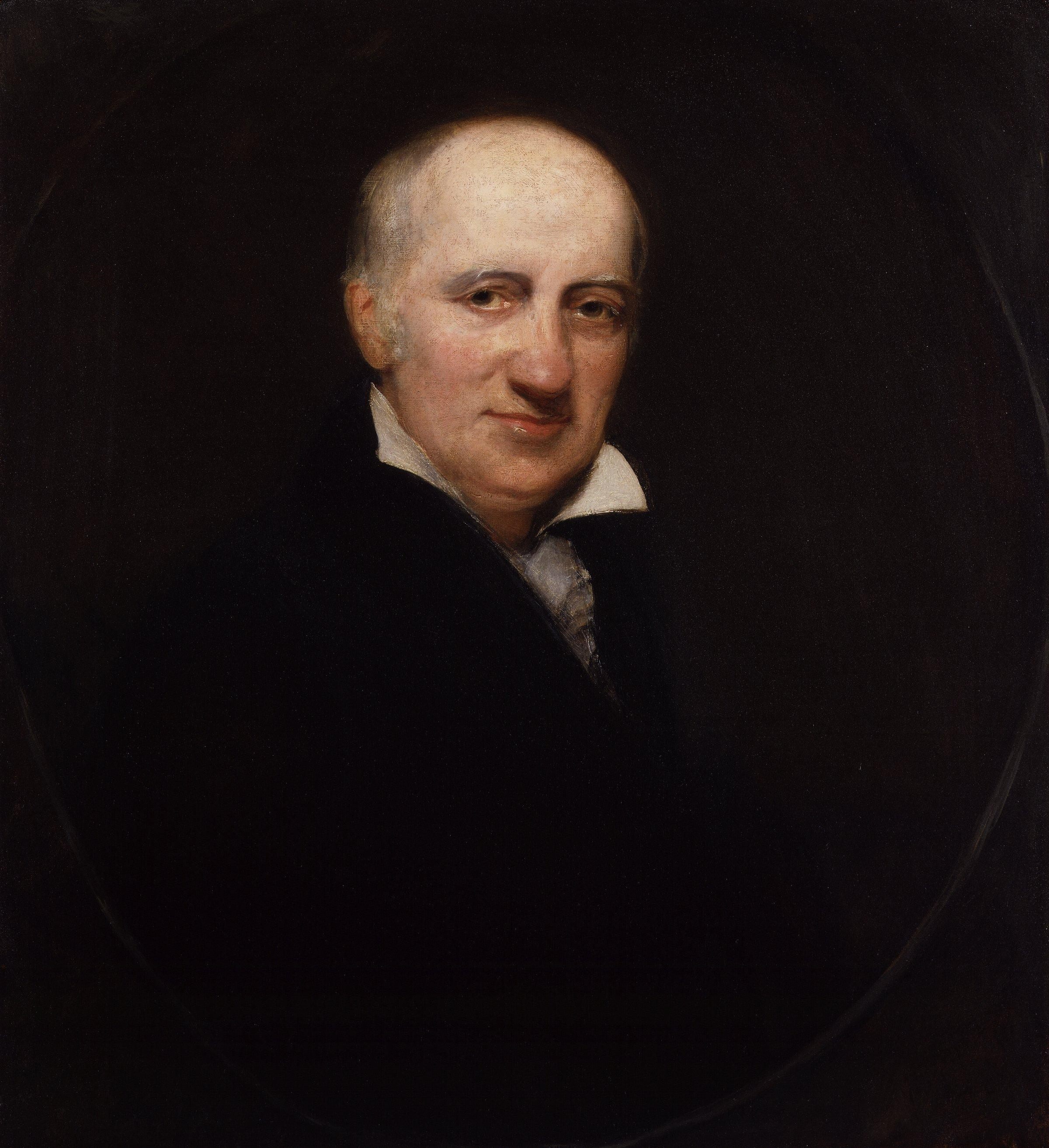
- 1830 portrait by Henry William Pickersgill
- Born: 3 March 1756; Wisbech, Cambridgeshire, England
- Died: 7 April 1836 (aged 80); Westminster, Middlesex, England
- Spouses: Mary Wollstonecraft (m. 1797; died 1797) Mary Jane Clairmont (m. 1801)

Education
- Education: Hoxton Academy

Philosophical work
- Era: Modern philosophy; Age of Enlightenment; 19th-century philosophy
- Region: Western philosophy; British philosophy
- School: Philosophical anarchism; Radicalism; Utilitarianism
- Main interests: Society; Politics; Ethics
- Notable works: Enquiry Concerning Political Justice; Things as They Are; or, The Adventures of Caleb Williams
- Notable ideas: Poet as legislator

William Godwin (3 March 1756 – 7 April 1836) was an English journalist, political philosopher and novelist. He is often considered one of the first exponents of utilitarianism as well as the first modern proponent of contemporary anarchism.

Godwin is most famous for two books that he published within the space of a year: An Enquiry Concerning Political Justice, an attack on political institutions, and Things as They Are; or, The Adventures of Caleb Williams, an early mystery novel that criticizes aristocratic privilege. Based on the success of both works, Godwin featured prominently in the radical circles of London in the 1790s.

He wrote prolifically in the genres of novels, history and demography throughout his life.

In the conservative reaction to British radicalism, Godwin was attacked, in part because of his marriage to the feminist writer Mary Wollstonecraft in 1797 and his candid biography of her after her death from childbirth.

Their daughter, later known as Mary Shelley, would go on to write Frankenstein and marry the poet Percy Bysshe Shelley.

With his second wife, Mary Jane Clairmont, Godwin established The Juvenile Library, which allowed the family to write their own works for children (sometimes under noms de plume) as well as translate and publish many other books, some of enduring significance.

Godwin has had considerable influence on British literature and literary culture.

Anarchist theoretician Peter Kropotkin would later claim Godwin to be a forerunner of anarchist communism.

== Early life and education ==
Godwin was born in Wisbech, Isle of Ely, Cambridgeshire, to John and Anne Godwin, the seventh of thirteen children. Godwin's family on both sides were middle-class and his parents adhered to a strict form of Calvinism. Godwin's mother came from a wealthy family but due to her uncle's frivolities the family wealth was squandered. Fortunately for the family, her father was a successful merchant involved in the Baltic Sea trade. Shortly following William's birth, his father John, a Nonconformist minister, moved the family to Debenham in Suffolk and later to Guestwick in Norfolk, which had a radical history as a Roundhead stronghold during the English Civil War. At the local meeting house, John Godwin often found himself sitting in "Cromwell's Chair", which had been a gift to the town by the Lord Protector.

William Godwin came from a long line of English Dissenters, who faced religious discrimination by the British government, and was inspired by his grandfather and father to take up the dissenting tradition and become a minister himself. At eleven years old, he became the sole pupil of Samuel Newton, a hard-line Calvinist and a disciple of Robert Sandeman. Although Newton's strict method of discipline left Godwin with a lasting anti-authoritarianism, Godwin internalized the Sandemanian creed, which emphasised rationalism, egalitarianism and consensus decision-making. Despite Godwin's later renunciation of Christianity, he maintained his Sandemanian roots, which he held responsible for his commitment to rationalism, as well as his stoic personality. Godwin later characterised Newton as, "... a celebrated north country apostle, who, after Calvin damned ninety-nine in a hundred of mankind, has contrived a scheme for damning ninety-nine in a hundred of the followers of Calvin." In 1771, Godwin was finally dismissed by Newton and returned home, but his father died the following year, which prompted his mother to urge him to continue his education.

At seventeen years old, Godwin began higher education at the Dissenting Academy in Hoxton, where he studied under Andrew Kippis, the biographer, and Abraham Rees, who was responsible for the Cyclopaedia, or an Universal Dictionary of Arts and Sciences. A hotspot for liberalism, at the Academy, Godwin familiarized himself with John Locke's approach to psychology, Isaac Newton's scientific method and Francis Hutcheson's ethical system, which all informed Godwin's philosophies of determinism and immaterialism. Although Godwin had joined the Academy as a committed Tory, the outbreak of the American Revolution led him to support the Whig opposition and, after reading the works of Jonathan Swift, he became a staunch republican. He familiarised himself with the French philosophes, learning of Jean-Jacques Rousseau's belief in the inherent goodness of human nature and opposition to private property, as well as Claude Adrien Helvétius's utilitarianism and Paul-Henri Thiry's materialism.

In 1778, Godwin graduated from the academy and was quickly appointed as a minister in Ware, where he met Joseph Fawcett, one of his main direct influences. By 1780, he had been reassigned to Stowmarket, where he first read Paul-Henri Thiry's System of Nature, adopting his philosophies of determinism and materialism. But after a conflict with other dissenting ministers of Suffolk over the administration of the eucharist, he stepped down and left for London in April 1782, resigning his career as a minister to become a writer.

== Early writing ==
Throughout 1783, Godwin published a series of written works, beginning with an anonymously published biography of William Pitt the Elder, followed by a couple of pro-Whig political pamphlets. He also briefly attempted to return to ministerial work in Beaconsfield, where he preached that "faith should be subordinated to reason". A few months later, during the opening of a seminary in Epsom, Godwin gave a politically charged speech in which he denounced state power as "artificial" and exalted the libertarian potential of education, which he believed could bring an end to authoritarian governments. Godwin then worked for a spell as a satirical literary critic, publishing The Herald of Literature, in which he reviewed non-existent works by real authors, imitating their writing styles in lengthy quotations.

His work on the Herald secured him further work as a critic for John Murray's English Review and a commission to translate Simon Fraser's memoirs. In 1784, he published the romantic novels Damon and Delia and Imogen, the latter of which was framed as a translation of a found manuscript from ancient Wales. That same year, he also published Sketches of History, which compiled six of his sermons about the characters of Aaron, Hazael and Jesus. Drawing from John Milton's Paradise Lost, which depicted Satan as a rebel against his creator, Godwin denounced the Christian God as a theocrat and a tyrant that had no right to rule.

In further attempts to earn money, Godwin started writing for well-paying Whig journals on Grub Street, starting work as a political journalist for the New Annual Register after being introduced to Georgie Robinson by Andrew Kippis. Godwin's work was then picked up by the Political Herald, where he wrote under the pseudonym of "Mucius" in order to attack the Tories. He subsequently reported on the Pitt ministry's colonial rule in Ireland and India; penned a history of the Dutch Revolt and predicted the outbreak of a revolutionary wave in Europe.

After the death of the Political Herald's editor, Godwin turned down Richard Brinsley Sheridan's offer of succeeding to the editorship, out of concern that his editorial independence would be compromised by a direct financial connection to the Whig Party. But it was through Sheridan that Godwin became acquainted with a life-long friend Thomas Holcroft, whose arguments convinced Godwin to finally reject Christianity and embrace atheism. At the same time, Godwin took up a side job as a tutor for the young Thomas Abthorpe Cooper. After a fractious relationship between the two, Godwin eventually became the orphaned boy's adoptive father, which altered his style of pedagogy to one that emphasised "an open and honest relationship between tutor and pupil."

With the outbreak of the French Revolution, Godwin was among the Radicals that enthusiastically welcomed the events as the spiritual successor to Britain's own Glorious Revolution of 1688. As a member of the Revolution Society, Godwin met the political activist Richard Price, whose Discourse on the Love of Our Country espoused a radical form of patriotism that controversially upheld freedom of religion, representative democracy and the right of revolution. Price's Discourse ignited a pamphlet war, beginning with Edmund Burke's publication of his Reflections on the Revolution in France, which defended traditionalist conservatism and opposed revolution. In response to Burke, Thomas Paine published his Rights of Man with the help of Godwin, who declared that "the seeds of revolution it contains are so vigorous in their stamina, that nothing can overpower them."

But Godwin's voice remained largely absent from the Revolution Controversy, as he had started writing a work of political philosophy that developed on his radical principles. With George Robinson's financial support, Godwin quit his work at the New Annual Register and committed himself wholly to his magnum opus, which he hoped would condense the "best and most liberal in the science of politics into a coherent system". After sixteen months' work, while the revolution in France had culminated with the execution of Louis XVI and the outbreak of war, Godwin published his Enquiry Concerning Political Justice in February 1793.

== Marriage to Mary Wollstonecraft ==
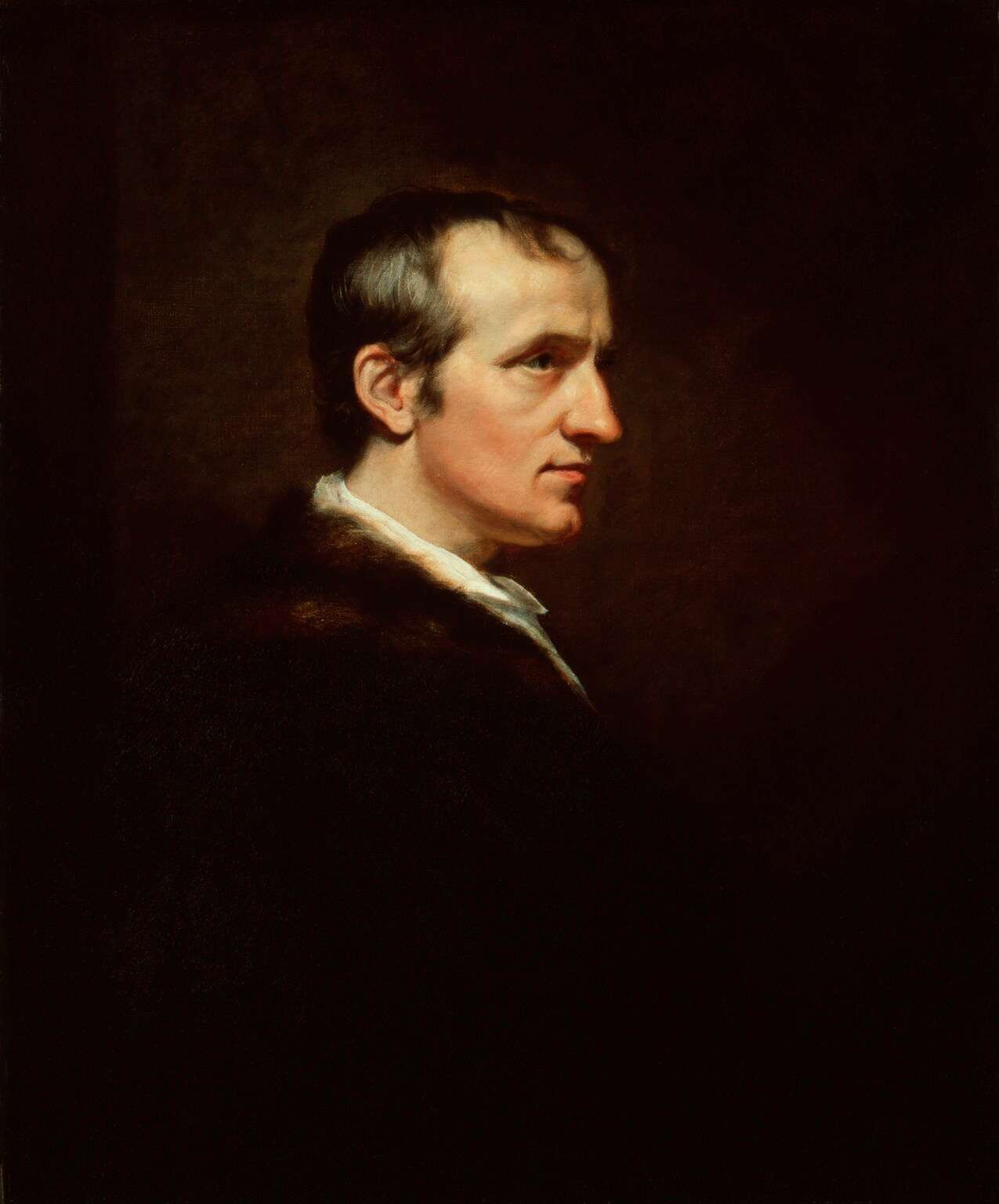
James Northcote, William Godwin, oil on canvas, 1802, the National Portrait Gallery

Godwin first met Mary Wollstonecraft at the home of their mutual publisher. Joseph Johnson was hosting a dinner for another of his authors, Thomas Paine, and Godwin remarked years later that on that evening he heard too little of Paine and too much of Wollstonecraft; he did not see her again for some years. In the interim, Wollstonecraft went to live in France to witness the Revolution for herself, and had a child, Fanny Imlay, with an American adventurer named Gilbert Imlay. In pursuit of Gilbert Imlay's business affairs, Wollstonecraft travelled to Scandinavia, and soon afterwards published a book based on the voyage. Godwin read it, and later wrote that "If ever there was a book calculated to make a man in love with its author, this appears to me to be the book."

When Godwin and Wollstonecraft were reintroduced in 1796, their respect for each other soon grew into friendship, sexual attraction, and love. Once Wollstonecraft became pregnant, they decided to marry so that their child would be considered legitimate by society. Their marriage revealed the fact that Wollstonecraft had never been married to Imlay, and as a result she and Godwin lost many friends. Godwin received further criticism because he had advocated the abolition of marriage in Political Justice. After their marriage at St. Pancras on 29 March 1797, they moved into two adjoining houses in Somers Town so that they could both still retain their independence; they often communicated by notes delivered by servants.

Mary Wollstonecraft Godwin was born in Somers Town on 30 August 1797, the couple's only child. Godwin had hoped for a son and had been planning on naming the child "William". On 10 September 1797 Wollstonecraft died of complications following the birth. By all accounts, it had been a happy and stable, though brief, relationship. Now Godwin, who had been a bachelor until a few months before, was distraught at the loss of the love of his life. Simultaneously, he became responsible for the care of these two young girls, the new-born Mary and toddler Fanny.

== Marriage to Mary Jane Claremont ==
In 1801, Godwin married his neighbour Mary Jane Clairmont. She brought two of her own children into the household, Charles and Claire. Journalist H.N. Brailsford wrote in 1913, "She was a vulgar and worldly woman, thoroughly feminine, and rather inclined to boast of her total ignorance of philosophy." While Fanny eventually learned to live with Clairmont, Mary's relationship with her stepmother was tense. Mary writes, "As to Mrs Godwin, something very analogous to disgust arises whenever I mention her", "A woman I shudder to think of".

== Book publishing and playwriting ==
In December 1800 his play Antonio, or the Soldier's Return was put on at the Theatre Royal, Drury Lane without success.

In 1805, the Godwins set up a shop and publishing house called the Juvenile Library, significant in the history of children's literature. Through this, Godwin wrote children's primers on Biblical and classical history, and using the pseudonym Edward Baldwin, he wrote a variety of books for children, including a version of Jack and the Beanstalk, and a biography of the Irish artist William Mulready, who illustrated works for them. They kept alive family ties, publishing the first book by Margaret King (then Lady Mount Cashell), who had been a favoured pupil of Mary Wollstonecraft. They published works never since out of print, such as Charles and Mary Lamb's Tales from Shakespeare. The Juvenile Library also translated European authors. The first English edition of Swiss Family Robinson was translated (from the French, not the German) and edited by them. The business was the family's mainstay for decades.

In 1807 his tragedy Faulkener was performed at the Theatre Royal Drury Lane without more success than his earlier play.

== Children ==
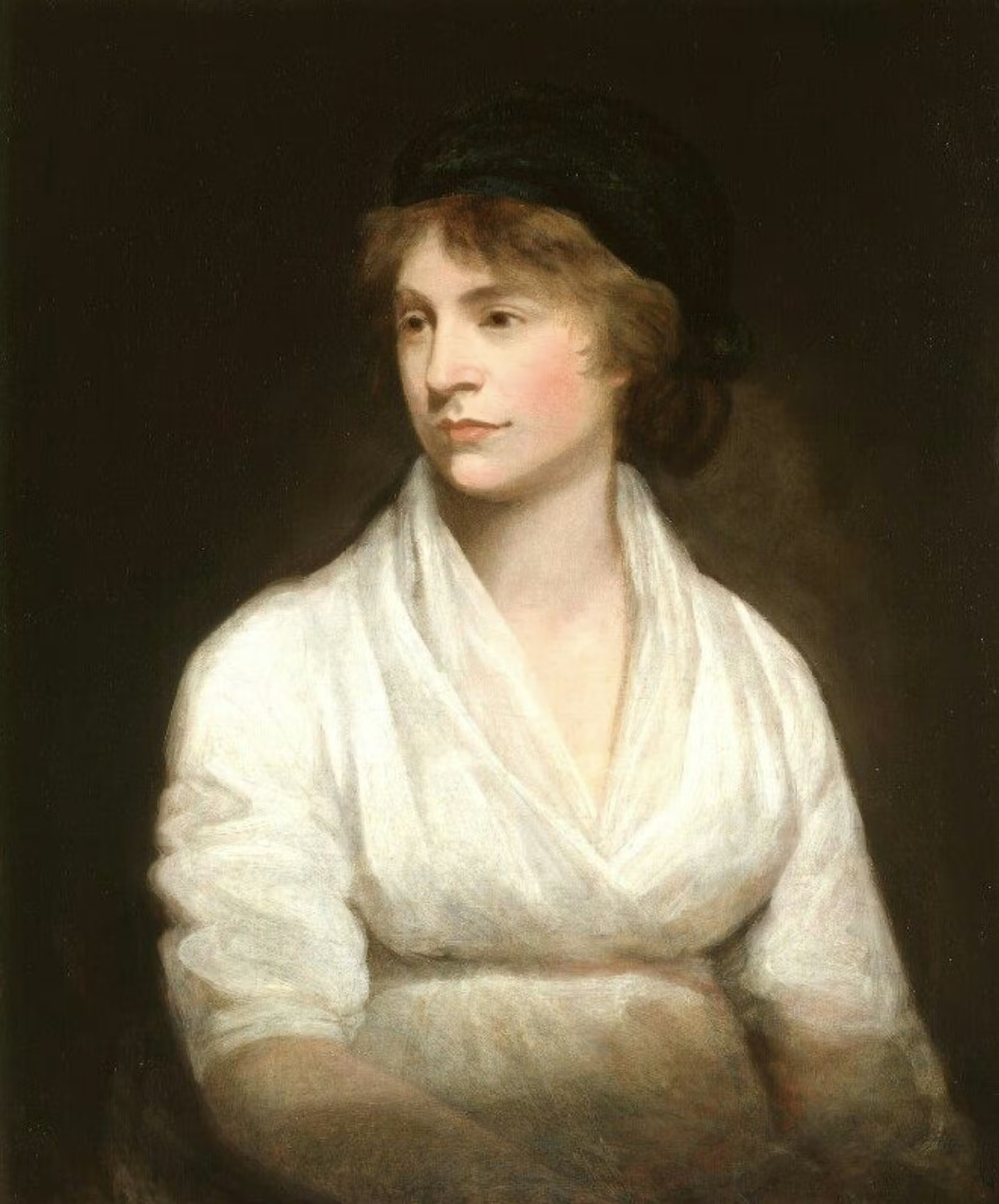
c. 1797 portrait of Mary Wollstonecraft

When Mary was three years old, Godwin left his daughters in the care of James Marshall while he travelled to Ireland. Godwin's tone in his letters demonstrates how much he cared about them. His letters show the stress he placed on giving his two daughters a sense of security. "And now what shall I say for my poor little girls? I hope they have not forgot me. I think of them every day, and should be glad, if the wind was more favourable, to blow them a kiss a-piece from Dublin to the Polygon.. but I have seen none that I love so well or think half so good as my own."

Godwin had one child from each of his marriages. Mary Godwin (1797–1851) gained fame as Mary Shelley, author of Frankenstein. William Godwin the Younger (1803–1832) was sent by his father to Charterhouse School and then to various other establishments of a practical bent. Nonetheless, he eventually earned his living by the pen. He died at 29, leaving the manuscript of a novel, which Godwin saw into print.

The eldest of Godwin's stepchildren was Fanny Imlay (1794–1816), who committed suicide as a young woman. Charles Gaulis Clairmont ended up as Chair of English literature at Vienna University and taught sons of the royal family; news of his sudden death in 1849 distressed Maximilian. Claire Clairmont was Mary Jane's only daughter, to whom she showed favouritism.

All of Godwin's children who lived into adulthood worked as writers or educators, carrying on his legacy and that of his wives. Only two of them had children who in turn survived: Percy Florence Shelley, and the son and daughter of Charles. Godwin did not welcome the birth of Allegra Byron, but Claire's only child died aged five.

Godwin had high hopes for Mary, giving her a more rigorous intellectual experience than most women of her period, and describing her as "very intelligent". He wished to give his daughter a more "masculine education" and prepared her to be a writer. However, Godwin withdrew his support as Mary became a woman and pursued her relationship with Percy Bysshe Shelley. Mary's first two novels, Frankenstein and Mathilda, may be seen as a reaction to her childhood. Both explore the role of the father in the child's socialisation and the control the father has on the child's future. Shelley's last two novels, Lodore and Falkner, re-evaluate the father-daughter relationship. They were written at a time when Shelley was raising her only surviving child alone and supporting her ageing father. In both novels, the daughter eludes the father's control by giving him the traditional maternal figure he asks for. This relationship gives the daughter control of the father.

== Later years and death ==
Godwin was awarded a sinecure position as Office Keeper and Yeoman Usher of the Receipt of the Exchequer, which came with grace and favour accommodation in New Palace Yard, part of the complex of the Palace of Westminster, i.e. the Houses of Parliament. One of his duties was to oversee the sweeping of the chimneys of these extensive buildings. On 16 October 1834, a fire broke out and most of the Palace burned down. Literary critic Marilyn Butler concluded her review of a 1980 biography of Godwin by comparing him favourably to Guy Fawkes, joking that Godwin was more successful in his opposition to the status quo.

In later years, Godwin came to expect support and consolation from his daughter. Two of the five children he had raised had pre-deceased him, and two more lived abroad. Mary responded to his expectations and she cared for him until he died in 1836.

In 1836, Harriet de Boinville described Godwin's death, in a letter to his daughter Mary, as "the extinction of a mastermind. ... Everything is interesting which relates to such a man, one of the gifted few under whose moral influences society is now vibrating."

== Legacy and memorials ==
Godwin was buried next to Mary Wollstonecraft in the graveyard of St Pancras, the church where they had married in 1797. His second wife outlived him, and eventually was buried there too. The three share a gravestone. In the 1850s, Mary Shelley's only surviving child, Percy Florence Shelley, had the remains of Godwin and Wollstonecraft moved from what had become a run-down area of the capital to the more salubrious surroundings of Bournemouth, to his family tomb at St Peter's Church.

The surviving manuscripts for many of Godwin's best-known works are held in the Forster Collection at the Victoria and Albert Museum. The V&A's manuscripts for Political Justice and Caleb Williams were both digitised in 2017 and are now included in the Shelley-Godwin Archive.

His birthplace, Wisbech, has two memorials to him. A cul-de-sac was named in his honour Godwin Close, and a wall plaque adorns a building adjacent to the Angles Theatre in Alexandra Road.

== Works and ideas ==
=== Enquiry Concerning Political Justice and Caleb Williams ===
In 1793, while the French Revolution was in full swing, Godwin published his great work on political science, Enquiry concerning Political Justice, and its Influence on General Virtue and Happiness. The first part of this book was largely a recap of Edmund Burke's A Vindication of Natural Society – a critique of the state. Godwin acknowledged the influence of Burke for this portion. The rest of the book is Godwin's positive vision of how an anarchist (or minarchist) society might work. Political Justice was extremely influential in its time: after the writings of Burke and Paine, Godwin's was the most popular written response to the French Revolution. Godwin's work was seen by many as illuminating a middle way between the fiery extremes of Burke and Paine. Prime Minister William Pitt famously said that there was no need to censor it, because at over £1 it was too costly for the average Briton to buy. However, as was the practice at the time, numerous "corresponding societies" took up Political Justice, either sharing it or having it read to the illiterate members. Eventually, it sold over 4000 copies and brought literary fame to Godwin.

Godwin augmented the influence of Political Justice with the publication of a novel that proved equally popular, Things as They Are; or, The Adventures of Caleb Williams. This tells the story of a servant who finds out a dark secret about Falkland, his aristocratic master, and is forced to flee because of his knowledge. Caleb Williams is essentially the first thriller: Godwin wryly remarked that some readers were consuming in a night what took him over a year to write. Not the least of its merits is a portrait of the justice system of England and Wales at the time and a prescient picture of domestic espionage. His literary method, as he described it in the introduction to the novel, also proved influential: Godwin began with the conclusion of Caleb being chased through Britain, and developed the plot backwards. Dickens and Poe both commented on Godwin's ingenuity in doing this.

=== Political writing ===
In response to a treason trial of some of his fellow British Jacobins, among them Thomas Holcroft, Godwin wrote Cursory Strictures on the Charge Delivered by Lord Chief Justice Eyre to the Grand Jury, 2 October 1794 in which he forcefully argued that the prosecution's concept of "constructive treason" allowed a judge to construe any behaviour as treasonous. It paved the way for a major victory for the Jacobins, as they were acquitted.

However, Godwin's own reputation was eventually besmirched after 1798 by the conservative press, in part because he chose to write a candid biography of his late wife, Mary Wollstonecraft, entitled Memoirs of the Author of A Vindication of the Rights of Woman, including accounts of her two suicide attempts and her affair (before her relationship with Godwin) with the American adventurer Gilbert Imlay, which resulted in the birth of Fanny Imlay.

Godwin, stubborn in his practice, practically lived in secret for 30 years because of his reputation. However, in its influence on writers such as Percy Shelley, who read the work on multiple occasions between 1810 and 1820, and Kropotkin, Political Justice takes its place with Milton's Areopagitica and Rousseau's Émile as a defining anarchist and libertarian text.

=== Interpretation of political justice ===
By political justice, the author meant "the adoption of any principle of morality and truth into the practice of a community," and the work was therefore an inquiry into the principles of society, government, and morals. For many years Godwin had been "satisfied that monarchy was a species of government unavoidably corrupt," and from desiring a government of the simplest construction, he gradually came to consider that "government by its very nature counteracts the improvement of original mind," demonstrating anti-statist beliefs that would later be considered anarchist.

Believing in the perfectibility of the human race, that there are no innate principles, and therefore no original propensity to evil, he considered that "our virtues and our vices may be traced to the incidents which make the history of our lives, and if these incidents could be divested of every improper tendency, vice would be extirpated from the world." All control of man by man was more or less intolerable, and the day would come when each man, doing what seems right in his own eyes, would also be doing what is in fact best for the community, because all will be guided by principles of pure reason.

Such optimism was combined with a strong empiricism to support Godwin's belief that the evil actions of men are solely reliant on the corrupting influence of social conditions, and that changing these conditions could remove the evil in man. This is similar to the ideas of his wife, Mary Wollstonecraft, concerning the shortcomings of women as due to discouragement during their upbringing.

Peter Kropotkin remarked of Godwin that when "speaking of property, he stated that the rights of every one 'to every substance capable of contributing to the benefit of a human being' must be regulated by justice alone: the substance must go 'to him who most wants it'. His conclusion was communism."

=== Debate with Malthus ===
In 1798, Thomas Robert Malthus wrote An Essay on the Principle of Population in response to Godwin's views on the "perfectibility of society". Malthus wrote that populations are inclined to increase in times of plenty, and that only distress, from causes such as food shortages, disease, or war, serves to stem population growth. Populations in his view are therefore always doomed to grow until distress is felt, at least by the poorer segment of the society. Consequently, poverty was felt to be an inevitable phenomenon of society.

Let us imagine for a moment Mr. Godwin's beautiful system of equality realized in its utmost purity, and see how soon this difficulty might be expected to press under so perfect a form of society.... Let us suppose all the causes of misery and vice in this island removed. War and contention cease. Unwholesome trades and manufactories do not exist. Crowds no longer collect together in great and pestilent cities.... Every house is clean, airy, sufficiently roomy, and in a healthy situation.... And the necessary labours of agriculture are shared amicably among all. The number of persons, and the produce of the island, we suppose to be the same as at present. The spirit of benevolence, guided by impartial justice, will divide this produce among all the members of the society according to their wants....With these extraordinary encouragements to population, and every cause of depopulation, as we have supposed, removed, the numbers would necessarily increase faster than in any society that has ever yet been known....

Malthus went on to argue that under such ideal conditions, the population could conceivably double every 25 years. However, the food supply could not continue doubling at this rate for even 50 years. The food supply would become inadequate for the growing population, and then:

...the mighty law of self-preservation expels all the softer and more exalted emotions of the soul.... The corn is plucked before it is ripe, or secreted in unfair proportions; and the whole black train of vices that belong to falsehood are immediately generated. Provisions no longer flow in for the support of the mother with a large family. The children are sickly from insufficient food.... No human institutions here existed, to the perverseness of which Mr. Godwin ascribes the original sin of the worst men. No opposition had been produced by them between public and private good. No monopoly had been created of those advantages which reason directs to be left in common. No man had been goaded to the breach of order by unjust laws. Benevolence had established her reign in all hearts: and yet in so short a period as within fifty years, violence, oppression, falsehood, misery, every hateful vice, and every form of distress, which degrade and sadden the present state of society, seem to have been generated by the most imperious circumstances, by laws inherent in the nature of man, and absolutely independent of it human regulations.

In Political Justice Godwin had acknowledged that an increase in the standard of living as he envisioned could cause population pressures, but he saw an obvious solution to avoiding distress: "project a change in the structure of human action, if not of human nature, specifically the eclipsing of the desire for sex by the development of intellectual pleasures". In the 1798 version of his essay, Malthus specifically rejected this possible change in human nature. In the second and subsequent editions, however, he wrote that widespread moral restraint, i.e., postponement of marriage and pre-nuptial celibacy (sexual abstinence), could reduce the tendency of a population to grow until distress was felt. Godwin also saw new technology as being partly responsible for the future change in human nature into more intellectually developed beings. He reasoned that increasing technological advances would lead to a decrease in the amount of time individuals spent on production and labour, and thereby, to more time spent on developing "their intellectual and moral faculties". Instead of population growing exponentially, Godwin believed that this moral improvement would outrun the growth of population. Godwin pictured a social utopia where society would reach a level of sustainability and engage in "voluntary communism".

In July 1820, Godwin published Of Population: An Enquiry Concerning the Power of Increase in the Numbers of Mankind as a rebuttal to Malthus' essays. Godwin's main argument was against Malthus' notion that population tends to grow exponentially. Godwin believed that for population to double every twenty-five years (as Malthus had asserted had occurred in the United States, due to the expanse of resources available there), every married couple would have to have at least eight children, given the rate of childhood deaths. Godwin himself was one of thirteen children, but he did not observe the majority of couples in his day having eight children. He therefore concluded:

In reality, if I had not taken up the pen with the express purpose of confuting all the errors of Mr Malthus's book, and of endeavouring to introduce other principles, more cheering, more favourable to the best interests of mankind, and better prepared to resist the inroads of vice and misery, I might close my argument here, and lay down the pen with this brief remark, that, when this author shall have produced from any country, the United States of North America not excepted, a register of marriages and births, from which it shall appear that there are on an average eight births to a marriage, then, and not till then, can I have any just reason to admit his doctrine of the geometrical ratio.

=== Interest in earthly immortality ===
In his first edition of Political Justice Godwin included arguments favouring the possibility of "earthly immortality" (what would now be called physical immortality), but later editions of the book omitted this topic. Although the belief in such a possibility is consistent with his philosophy regarding perfectibility and human progress, he probably dropped the subject because of political expedience when he realised that it might discredit his other views.

== Family tree ==
Family tree of William Godwin

Sir John Lethbridge (1746–1815)	Mary Jane Vial Clairmont (c. 1766–1841)	William Godwin (1756–1836)	Mary Wollstonecraft (1759–1797)	Gilbert Imlay (1754?–1828)
Lady Byron (1792–1860)	Lord Byron (1789–1824)	Claire Clairmont (1798–1879)	William Godwin the Younger (1803–1832)	Mary Shelley (1797–1851)	Percy Bysshe Shelley (1792–1822)	Fanny Imlay (1794–1816)
Ada Lovelace (1815–1852)	Allegra Byron (1817–1822)	William (1816–1819)	Clara Everina (1817–1818)	Sir Percy Shelley, 3rd Baronet (1819–1888)	Clara (1815–1815)

Notes:

Source: Tomalin, Claire (1992) [1980]. Shelley and His World. Penguin. p. 115. ISBN 0140171525.

== List of works ==
=== Novels ===
- Damon and Delia, A Tale (1784)
- Imogen: A Pastoral Romance From the Ancient British (1784)
- Things as They Are; or, The Adventures of Caleb Williams (1794)
- St. Leon (1799)
- The Looking Glass: A True History of the Early Years of an Artist (1805)
- Fleetwood (1805)
- Mandeville (1817)
- Cloudesley: A Tale (1830)
- Deloraine (1833)

=== Other fiction ===
- Antonio: A Tragedy In Five Acts (1800) – play
- Fables, Ancient And Modern: Adapted For The Use Of Children (1840) – posthumously published

=== Non-fiction ===
- Enquiry concerning Political Justice, and its Influence on General Virtue and Happiness (1793)
- The Enquirer (London: George Robinson, 1797; rev. 1823)
- Memoirs of the Author of A Vindication of the Rights of Woman (1798)
- Life of Geoffrey Chaucer (1804)
- The Pantheon: Or, Ancient History of the Gods of Greece and Rome (1814)
- Lives Of Edward And John Philips, Nephews And Pupils Of Milton (1815)
- Life of Lady Jane Grey, and of Lord Guildford Dudley, Her Husband (1824)
- History of the Commonwealth of England (1824–1828)
- Thoughts on Man, his Nature, Productions, and Discoveries, Interspersed with some particulars respecting the author (1831)
- Lives of the Necromancers (1834)
- Transfusion (1835)

== Bibliography ==
- Brailsford, Henry Noel (2009) [1913]. Shelley, Godwin, and their circle. Home University Library of Modern Knowledge. Vol. LXXVII. London: Oxford University Press. OCLC 914564890. Archived from the original on 1 August 2017 – via gutenberg.org.
- Bakay, Gonlil (2016). William Godwin, Mary Wollstonecraft, Mary Shelley, and their offspring, Victor Frankenstein: A Family of Rebels. Lewiston: Edwin Mellen Press. ISBN 978-1495504525. LCCN 2016010810. OCLC 944086351.
- Butler, Marilyn (1984). Burke, Paine, Godwin, and the Revolution Controversy. Cambridge: Cambridge University Press. ISBN 0521286565.
- Carlson, Julie A. (2007). England's First Family of Writers: Mary Wollstonecraft, William Godwin, Mary Shelley. Baltimore: Johns Hopkins University Press. ISBN 978-0801886188. OCLC 1160369044.
- Durant, Will (1965). The Age of Voltaire. The Story of Civilization. Vol. 9. New York: Simon & Schuster. ISBN 0671013254. OCLC 416169760.
- Gagliano, G. (2013). Utopia e antagonismo politico. Nella riflessione di Gerrard Winstanley e William Godwin (in Italian). Rome: Aracne. ISBN 978-8854864535.
- Godwin, William (1986). Marshall, Peter H. (ed.). The Anarchist Writings of William Godwin. London: Freedom Press. ISBN 978-0900384295.
- Locke, Don (1980). A Fantasy of Reason: The Life & Thought of William Godwin. Routledge & Kegan Paul. ISBN 978-0710003874.
- Marshall, Peter H. (1984). William Godwin: Philosopher, Novelist, Revolutionary. London & New Haven: Yale University Press. ISBN 978-0300105445.
- Marshall, Peter H. (2008) [1992]. Demanding the Impossible: A History of Anarchism. London: Harper Perennial. ISBN 978-0006862451. OCLC 218212571.
- McElroy, Wendy (2008). "Godwin, William (1756–1836)". In Hamowy, Ronald (ed.). Godwin, William (1856–1836). The Encyclopedia of Libertarianism. Thousand Oaks, CA: Sage; Cato Institute. p. 211. doi:10.4135/9781412965811.n126. ISBN 978-1412965804. LCCN 2008009151. OCLC 750831024. Archived from the original on 30 September 2020.
- McKinley, C. Alexander (2019). "The French Revolution and 1848". In Levy, Carl; Adams, Matthew S. (eds.). The Palgrave Handbook of Anarchism. Cham: Springer Publishing. pp. 307–324. doi:10.1007/978-3-319-75620-2_18. ISBN 978-3-319-75620-2. OCLC 7704845112. S2CID 158876153.
- Mukherjee, S.; Ramaswamy, S. (2002). William Godwin: His Thoughts and Works. New Delhi: Deep & Deep Publications. ISBN 978-8171007547.
- Newton, A. Edward (1918). "A Ridiculous Philosopher". The amenities of book-collecting. Boston: The Atlantic Monthly Press. pp. 226–248.
- Philp, Mark (1993). Political And Philosophical Writings Of William Godwin. London: Pickering & Chatto Limited. ISBN 1851960937.
- Robinson, Cedric J. (1980). The Terms of Order: Political Science and the Myth of Leadership. SUNY Press. ISBN 978-0873954112. Archived from the original on 10 February 2021.
- Stephen, Leslie (1902). "William Godwin's Novels" . Studies of a Biographer. Vol. 3. London: Duckworth & Co. pp. 119–164.
- St. Clair, William (1989). The Godwins and the Shelleys: The biography of a family. New York: W.W. Norton and Co. ISBN 0801842336.
- Sunstein, Emily (1975). A Different Face: the Life of Mary Wollstonecraft. Boston: Little, Brown and Co. ISBN 0060142014.
- Thomas, Richard Gough (2019). William Godwin: A Political Life. London: Pluto Press. ISBN 978-1786803894. OCLC 1090781689.
- Tomalin, Claire (1992a) [1974]. The Life and Death of Mary Wollstonecraft. New York: Penguin. ISBN 0140167617.
- Wardle, Ralph M. (1951). Mary Wollstonecraft: A Critical Biography. Lincoln: University of Nebraska Press.
