= Hurstbourne Tarrant =

Village and civil parish in Hampshire, England

Coordinates: 51.277490°N 1.451262°W

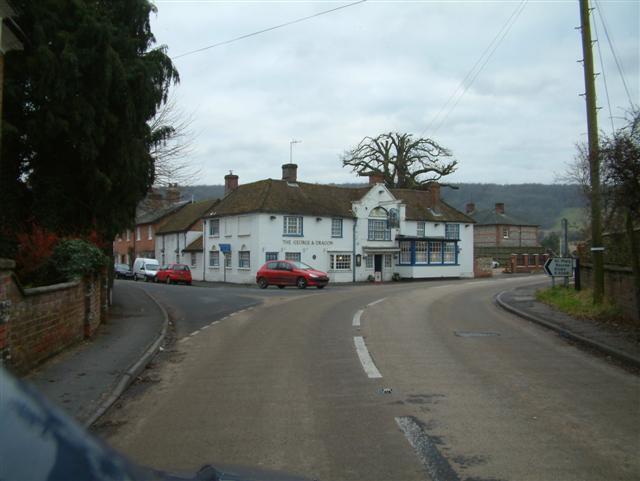
- The George and Dragon

- Location within Hampshire
- Population: 864 (2011 Census including Pill Heath)
- OS grid reference: SU3837253292
- District: Test Valley
- Shire county: Hampshire
- Region: South East
- Country: England
- Sovereign state: United Kingdom
- Post town: Andover
- Postcode district: SP11
- Dialling code: 01264
- Police: Hampshire and Isle of Wight
- Fire: Hampshire and Isle of Wight
- Ambulance: South Central
- UK Parliament: North West Hampshire

Hurstbourne Tarrant is a village and civil parish in Hampshire, England. It lies to the north of the county in the Test Valley.

== History ==
The Tarrant part of the name originates from 1226, when the village was given to the Cistercian Tarrant nunnery. The civil parish includes the village of Ibthorpe.

During the Second World War, Hurstbourne Tarrant was the decoy site for RAF Andover, the headquarters of RAF Maintenance Command. This was one of four airfields in Hampshire to be given a decoy site in 1940, to deceive enemy aircraft into attacking a spurious target. The decoy site at Hurstbourne Tarrant was a type 'K' decoy site with fake aircraft and buildings. From September 1940, fake machine gun posts were added to Hurstbourne Tarrant.

Located near the top of Hurstbourne hill along the A343 there is a Royal Observer Corps (ROC) nuclear monitoring post which was likely built following the Second World War, and was apparently closed in 1991 and demolished in the following years.

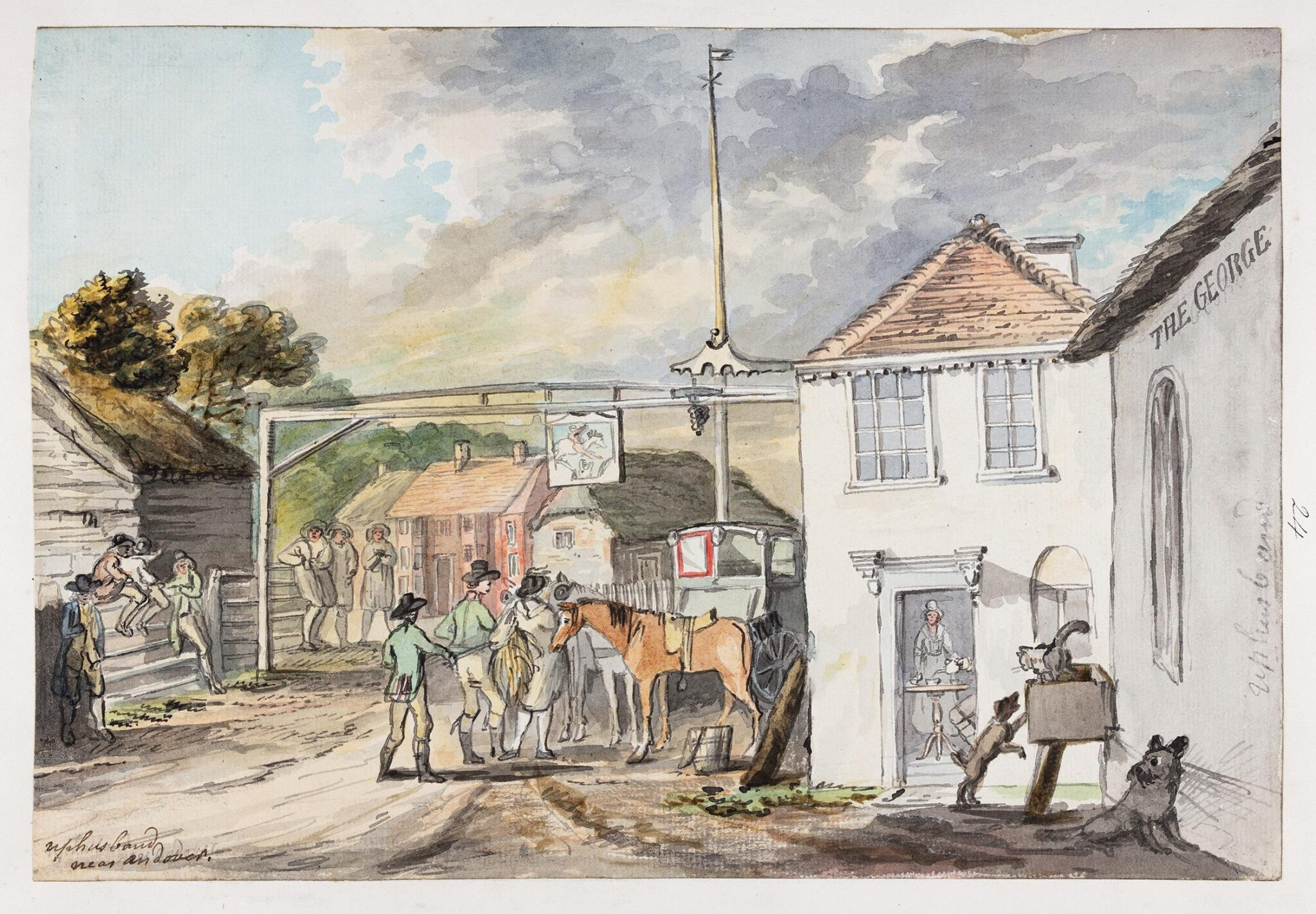
Uphusband near Andover by John Nixon (1755–1818), showing The George and Dragon, a coaching inn

William Cobbett declared Hurstbourne Tarrant and its location as worth going miles to see with beauty at every turn. He referred to it in his book Rural Rides (1830; but serialised from 1822) as Uphusband.

In the winter of 2014 a blockage in a drain caused a culvert on Church street to burst from excessive rainfall, this prompted the excavation of ditches and the construction of new drainage infrastructure with assistance from the army

== Hurstbourne House ==
Hurstbourne House is a grade II listed late 17th-century country house at the edge of the village. It was renovated in the late 18th and early 19th centuries. It is home to the Sharpe family. The original central range was built in two storeys, and has 19th-century three-storey cross-wings at each end. The walls are stucco rendered and the roof tiled. The frontage has three bays, the central one recessed.

== Notable residents ==
The American Victorian/Edwardian artist Anna Lea Merritt lived in the village before her death in 1930.

== See also ==
- Test Valley
- RAF Andover
- Starfish site
