= Ibthorpe =

Village in Hampshire, England

Coordinates: 51.2811°N 1.46°W

- Location within Hampshire
- OS grid reference: SU3753
- District: Test Valley
- Shire county: Hampshire
- Region: South East
- Country: England
- Sovereign state: United Kingdom
- Post town: Andover
- Postcode district: SP11
- Police: Hampshire and Isle of Wight
- Fire: Hampshire and Isle of Wight
- Ambulance: South Central
- UK Parliament: North West Hampshire

Ibthorpe is a village in Hampshire, England. Ibthorpe is in the civil parish of Hurstbourne Tarrant.

== Name ==
Ibthorpe is named after "Ibbaprop" which means, "Ibba's second settlement".

== The Hamlet ==
Most houses are situated around a central horseshoe-shaped road, with some extending toward neighbouring Hurstbourne Tarrant.

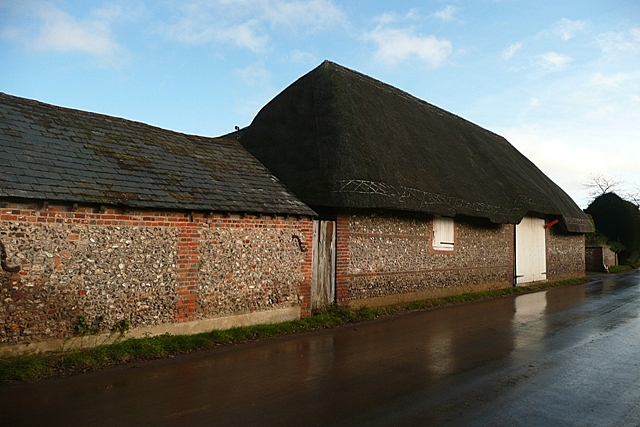
Thatched barn

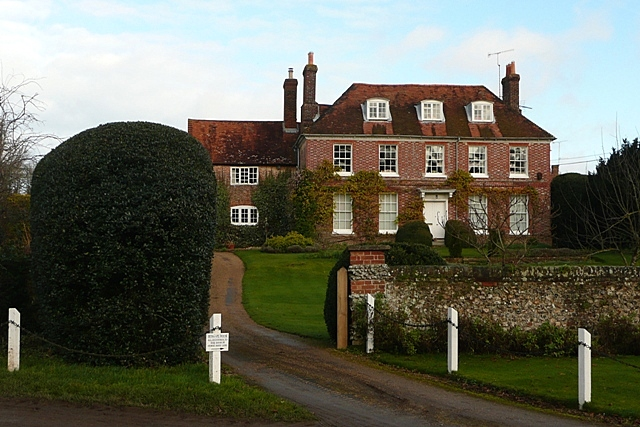
Ibthorpe House

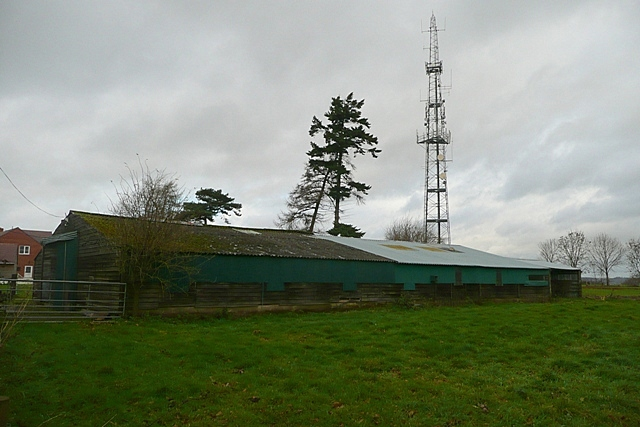
Ibthorpe radio tower
