= Things as They Are; or, The Adventures of Caleb Williams =

1794 British three-volume Jacobin mystery novel by William Godwin

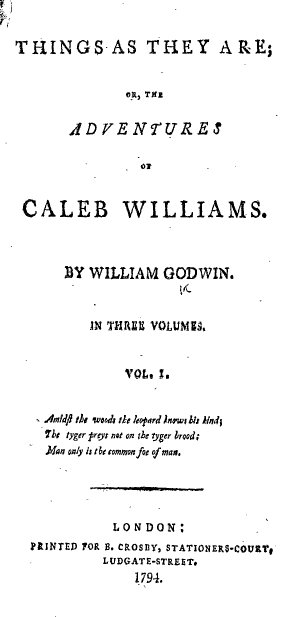
- Title page of the first edition, volume I
- Author: William Godwin
- Language: English
- Genre: Novel, political philosophy
- Publisher: B. Crosby
- Publication date: 2 June 1794
- Publication place: London, United Kingdom
- OCLC: 1928669

Things as They Are; or The Adventures of Caleb Williams (1794; retitled The Adventures of Caleb Williams; or Things as They Are in 1831, and often abbreviated to Caleb Williams) by William Godwin is a three-volume novel written as a call to end the abuse of power by what Godwin saw as a tyrannical government. Intended as a popularisation of the ideas presented in his 1793 treatise Political Justice Godwin uses Caleb Williams to show how legal and other institutions can and do destroy individuals, even when the people the justice system touches are innocent of any crime. This reality, in Godwin's mind, was therefore a description of "things as they are". The original manuscript included a preface that was removed from publication, because its content alarmed booksellers of the time.

== Plot summary ==
=== Volume I ===
The main character, Caleb Williams, is of humble birth, unusual for Godwin, since his characters are often persons of wealth and title. Caleb Williams, a poor, self-educated, orphaned young man, and the novel's first-person narrator, is recommended for a job on the estate of the wealthy Ferdinando Falkland. Although Falkland is generally a reserved and quiet master, he is also prone to sudden fits of rage. Concerned about his outbursts, Caleb asks Mr Collins, administrator of Falkland's estate, if he knows the cause of Falkland's odd temper.

Collins proceeds to tell of Falkland's past, citing Falkland's long history of stressing reason over bloodshed. Falkland's neighbour, Barnabas Tyrrel, was a tyrannical master who oppressed and manipulated his tenants. Tyrrel became the enemy and competitor of Falkland, who was loved for his brave and generous demeanor. Falkland continually righted the many wrongs Tyrrel caused members of his household and his neighbours, which only elevated the community's respect and esteem for Falkland. He also saved Tyrrel's niece, Emily Melvile, from a fire, an act of heroism that caused Emily to fall in love with Falkland. The outraged Tyrrel kept Emily imprisoned in his estate, and had her arrested on false charges when she tried to escape. Emily's emotional distress at these events resulted in her falling ill and dying. The conflict between the two men came to a head when, at the funeral services for Emily, Tyrrel physically attacked Falkland. Tyrrel himself was found murdered shortly afterward. Although immediately considered a suspect in Tyrrel's murder, Falkland defended himself on the basis of his spotless reputation. Instead, two of Tyrrel's tenants were found with incriminating evidence, convicted of the murder, and hanged. Falkland's emotional state, Mr Collins explains, has been wavering ever since.

=== Volume II ===
The account of Falkland's early life intrigues Caleb, though he still finds the aristocrat's strange behaviours suspicious. Caleb obsessively researches aspects of the Tyrrel murder case for some time and his doubts gradually increase. He convinces himself that Falkland is secretly guilty of the murder.

When Caleb's distrust is exposed, Falkland finally admits that he is the murderer of Tyrrel, but forces Caleb to be silent about the issue under penalty of death. Falkland frames and falsely accuses Caleb of attempting to rob him of a large sum of money. Caleb, however, flees the estate, but is later convinced to return to defend himself with the promise that, if he can do so effectively in court, he will be freed. Falkland's brother-in-law oversees a fraudulent trial of the two and, eventually, sides with Falkland, having Caleb arrested. The anguish of a life in prison is documented through Caleb and other wretched inmates. Eventually, a servant of Falkland supplies Caleb with tools he can use to escape, which he successfully does, venturing out into the wild.

=== Volume III ===
Caleb must now live a life evading Falkland's attempts to recapture and silence him. In the wilderness, Caleb is robbed by a band of criminals, physically attacked by one in particular, and then rescued by a different man who takes him to the headquarters of this same group of thieves. Caleb's saviour turns out to be their captain. The Captain accepts Caleb and promptly banishes Caleb's attacker, a man called Jones (or Gines in some editions), from the group. Caleb and the Captain later debate the morality of being a thief and living outside the oppressive restrictions of the law. Shortly afterward, a sympathiser of Jones tries to kill Caleb and then reveals his whereabouts to the authorities, forcing Caleb to flee once more.

As he is boarding a ship to Ireland, Caleb is confused for another criminal and again arrested. He bribes his captors to obtain freedom before they discover that he is in fact wanted after all. While Caleb makes a living by publishing stories about notorious criminals, the vengeful Jones subsequently puts out a reward for Caleb's capture and keeps Caleb's movements under careful surveillance.

Ultimately betrayed by a neighbour, Caleb is taken to court; however, Caleb's accusers do not show up and he is abruptly released only to be immediately ensnared by Jones and sent to confront Falkland, face to face. Falkland, now aged, gaunt, and frail, claims that he deliberately did not show up in court, so that he could persuade Caleb to put in writing that his accusations are unfounded. However, Caleb refuses to lie for Falkland, and Falkland threatens him, but lets him go. Falkland later sends the impoverished Caleb money to try to bribe him. Next, Caleb attempts to make a living in Wales, but must move around frequently as Jones continues to track him. When Caleb finally decides to travel to the Netherlands, Jones confronts him and reveals to him the true scope of Falkland's tyrannical power, warning Caleb that he will be either murdered or caught and executed if he attempts to leave the country. At last, Caleb convinces a magistrate to summon Falkland to court so that he can make his accusations public and reveal Falkland's guilt once and for all.

==== Published ending ====
Before an emotional court, Caleb vindicates himself and makes his accusations of Falkland; however, he reveals his sadness at having become part of the same vicious mindset as Falkland that forces people into groups competing for power. Ultimately, Caleb finds a universality among all humans, whether the oppressor or the oppressed, finding humanity even in Falkland. He even voices his admiration and respect for many of Falkland's positive qualities, including his ideals. The two forgive each other and it is noted that Falkland dies soon thereafter. Despite his noble pursuit of justice, though, Caleb is not contented, believing his success a hollow one and holding himself responsible for Falkland's death. Caleb concludes with an explanation that the point of the book is merely to straighten out the details of Falkland's turbulent history, rather than to condemn the man.

==== Original manuscript ending ====
The original and more controversial manuscript ending was not officially published, though is often included as an appendix in many current editions of the novel. In this version, Falkland argues in court that Caleb's agenda is merely revenge. Caleb responds, claiming himself to be a voice of justice and offering to gather witnesses against Falkland, but the magistrate suddenly silences him and denies his offer, calling Caleb insolent and his accusations ludicrous. With some pages missing, the story jumps to the final scene of Caleb imprisoned some time later, with none other than Jones as his warden. Caleb's narration now seems erratic and disorganised, implying that he has gone mad. Caleb is informed that Falkland has died recently, but does not seem to remember who Falkland is. In his delirium, Caleb concludes that true happiness lies in being like a gravestone that reads, "Here lies what was once a man."

== Manuscript ==
The surviving holograph manuscript for Caleb Williams is held in the Forster Collection at the Victoria and Albert Museum, along with several other works by Godwin. Following Godwin's death in 1836, many of the writer's manuscripts were bought at auction by the collector Dawson Turner. In 1859 the texts for Political Justice, Caleb Williams, Life of Chaucer, and History of the Commonwealth of England were all acquired by John Forster, who died in 1876. Forster's will stipulated that his extensive collection should be given to the South Kensington Museum after his wife's death. In the event, Eliza Ann Forster transferred the Godwin manuscripts to the Museum straight away. The bound volume for Caleb Williams also contains Godwin's text for the novel's original conclusion.

The V&A's manuscripts for Political Justice and Caleb Williams were both digitised in 2017 and are now included in the Shelley-Godwin Archive.

== Reviews of Caleb Williams ==
The novel is classified as one of the best examples of the "victim-of-society story". The preface and subtitle of Caleb Williams indicate to the reader that social theory is the main purpose of the novel.

The 1790s was a time of radical political thought in Britain, due to the inspiration created from the French Revolution in 1789, which inspired the questioning of the power held by King George III and the Prime Minister William Pitt. Published in 1794, William Godwin chose the date of publication as 12 May, the same day the Prime Minister had suspended habeas corpus to begin mass arrests of suspected radicals. Godwin had already attained fame a year earlier through his publication of Enquiry Concerning Political Justice. The subject matter, in combination with the political climate upon release, resulted in an extreme divergence of opinion regarding Caleb Williams.

A critic wrote, "Fancy is a faculty which we should not have expected to find in the brain of a philosopher who had struck his hand upon his heart and felt it stone; yet fancy Mr. Godwin possesses in no common degree."

Many saw the book as an affront not only to government but also to justice, virtue, and religion. One review from the British Critic in July 1794 stated, "This piece is a striking example of the evil use which may be made of considerable talents…every gentleman is a hard-hearted assassin, or a prejudiced tyrant; every Judge is unjust, every Justice corrupt and blind." Many critics saw Caleb Williams as having a detrimental effect on society as propaganda for anarchism. These critics saw Caleb Williams as attacking the current established order, that Godwin was effectively spreading his "evil" principles throughout society. The same critic states, "When a work is so directly pointed at every band which connects society, and at every principle which renders it amiable, its very merits become noxious as they tend to cause its being known in a wider circle." There were also those who viewed the novel negatively in a different manner, as fictitious to a degree of irrelevance in its form as political commentary. This argument asserted that Godwin represented the law falsely to push his anarchistic ideals. Another reviewer from the British Critic wrote in April 1795, "a Philosopher has invented a Fable for the purpose of attacking the moral and political prejudices of his countrymen, and in all the instances in which he has affected to state the law of the land, and to reason from it, has stated it falsely; and it is almost superfluous to say, that in so doing, he has outraged Philosophy, Reason, and Morality, the foundation, object, and end of which is Truth."

Anthony Trollope gave a lecture in 1870, published as On English Prose Fiction ..., which included: "[Caleb Williams has been] the subject of eulogies which I cannot understand ... It was written to depict the agony of one who suffered innocently from the despotic power of the English aristocracy, and is intended as a denunciation of the injustice of the time. But ... his sufferings were not compatible with the practice of law or the usages of life in those days. To my idea the book is false. It is certainly unreal, harsh, gloomy, and devoid of life. The writer was a fierce democrat, attacking every existing institution." See An Autobiography, Anthony Trollope, Nicholas Shrimpton (ed.), 2014. ISBN 978-0-19-967529-6.

Caleb Williams was otherwise received positively. Ford K. Brown writes in his biography of Godwin, The Life of William Godwin, of a story in which a young boy finds out he just missed the author of Caleb Williams and "with true genuine enthusiasm, falling suddenly on his knees, reverently kissed the chair which the philosopher had just quitted, rapturously thanking heaven that he might now say he had been in company with the author of the best novel in the English, or in any language". A notably appreciative review was included in William Hazlitt's essay "William Godwin" in The Spirit of the Age in which Hazlitt exclaims of the author: "he was in the very zenith of a sultry and unwholesome popularity; he blazed as a sun in the firmament of reputation; no one was more talked of, more looked up to, more sought after, and wherever liberty, truth, justice was the theme, his name was not far off—now he has sunk below the horizon, and enjoyed the serene twilight of a doubtful immortality." Of his novel, Hazlitt writes that "no one ever began Caleb Williams that did not read it through: no one that ever read it could possibly forget it, or speak of it after any length of time but with an impression as if the events and feelings had been personal to himself." Elton and Esther Smith, in their biography of Godwin, William Godwin, relate an anecdote from Godwin describing his friend Joseph Gerald's reception of Caleb Williams: "having started Volume One late in the evening, he was unable to close his eyes in sleep until he had read through all three volumes".

== Stage version ==
To evade a censorship ban on presenting the novel on the stage, the impresario Richard Brinsley Sheridan presented the piece on the stage of his Drury Lane Theatre in 1796 under the title The Iron Chest, his pretext for avoiding censorship being that his resident composer Stephen Storace had made an "operatic version" of the story.

== Television version ==
Mick Ford starred as Caleb Williams in a successful TV-miniseries (German-French-Swiss-Austrian-British-Italian co-production of 1980) by Herbert Wise with a special soundtrack by Hans Posegga.
