= Mandeville (novel) =

Mandeville, a tale of the seventeenth century (1817) is a three volume novel written by William Godwin.

== Plot summary ==
Orphaned at a young age due to his family's involvement in the English colonization of Ireland, Charles Mandeville is brought up in England by his reclusive uncle Audley Mandeville. His sister, Henrietta, is brought up by family friends. Charles attends Winchester school, where he is falsely accused of possessing a subversive print of Charles I and becomes jealous of the most popular boy, Lionel Clifford. He later discovers that an unprincipled boy named Mallison was responsible. The stain on Charles's reputation stays with him through his time at Oxford University, and is compounded by a misunderstanding about his involvement in a failed royalist plot. It was assumed that he was a coward for not taking part, but the role he was promised was unexpectedly given to Clifford. Charles becomes insane and is taken to a lunatic asylum in Cowley and then nursed back to health by Henrietta. Lord Montagu attempts a reconciliation between Charles and Clifford, but this fails. Mallison and his uncle, Holloway, become involved in managing Audley's Mandeville's estate. When Audley dies, Charles keeps them on, even though he knows that they are corrupt. Clifford converts to Catholicism while exile in Belgium, making Charles dislike him even more. Clifford and Henrietta fall in love while at Lord Montagu's house. On what he thinks is the eve of their marriage, Charles attempts to kidnap Henrietta, but the marriage has already taken place and he is wounded in the face by Clifford.

== Mentioned in other works ==
Near the middle of Chapter XX of Two Years Before the Mast (1840), Richard Henry Dana Jr. mentions "Mandeville, a Romance, by Godwin, in five volumes":

...for two days I was up early and late, reading with all my might, and actually drinking in delight. It is no extravagance to say that it was like a spring in a desert land.

Edgar Allan Poe also quotes Mandeville in his tale "Loss of Breath" (1832): "Most philosophers, upon many points of philosophy, are still very unphilosophical. William Godwin, however, says in his Mandeville, that 'invisible things are the only realities', and this, all will allow, is a case in point."
