= Enquiry Concerning Political Justice =

1793 book by William Godwin

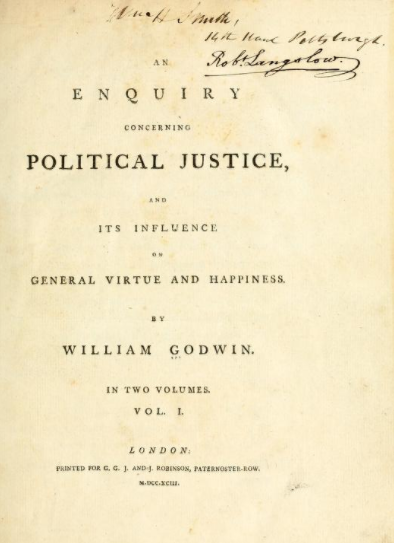
- Cover, circa 1793
- Author: William Godwin
- Language: English
- Subject: Political philosophy
- Publication date: 14 February 1793
- Publication place: Great Britain (now the United Kingdom)
- Media type: Print

Enquiry Concerning Political Justice and its Influence on General Virtue and Happiness is a 1793 book by the philosopher William Godwin, in which the author outlines his political philosophy. It is the first modern work to elucidate anarchism.

== Background and publication ==
Godwin began thinking about Political Justice in 1791, after the publication of Thomas Paine's Rights of Man in response to Edmund Burke's Reflections on the Revolution in France (1790). However, unlike most of the works that Burke's work spawned in the ensuing Revolution Controversy, Godwin's did not address the specific political events of the day; it addressed the underlying philosophical principles. Its length and expense (it cost over £1) made it inaccessible to the popular audience of the Rights of Man and probably protected Godwin from the persecution that other writers such as Paine experienced. Nevertheless, Godwin became a revered figure among radicals and was seen as an intellectual leader among their groups. One way in which this happened is through the many unauthorized copies of the text, the extracts printed by radical journals, and the lectures John Thelwall gave based on its ideas.

== Content ==
Despite being published during the French Revolution, the French Revolutionary Wars, and the lead up to the 1794 Treason Trials in Britain, Political Justice argues that humanity will inevitably progress: it argues for human perfectibility and enlightenment. McCann explains that "Political Justice is ... first and foremost a critique of political institutions. Its vision of human perfectibility is anarchist in so far as it sees government and related social practices such as property monopoly, marriage and monarchy as restraining the progress of mankind". Godwin believed that government "insinuates itself into our personal dispositions, and insensibly communicates its own spirit to our private transactions". Instead, Godwin proposes a society in which human beings use their reason to decide the best course of action. The very existence of governments, even those founded through consensus, demonstrates that people cannot yet regulate their conduct by the dictates of reason.

Godwin argued that the link between politics and morality had been severed and he wanted to restore it. McCann explains that in Godwin's vision, "as public opinion develops in accordance with the dictates of reason, so too should political institutions change until, finally, they will wither away altogether, leaving the people to organize themselves into what would be a direct democracy". Godwin believed that the public could be rational; he wrote: "Opinion is the most potent engine that can be brought within the sphere of political society. False opinion, superstition and prejudice, have hitherto been the true supporters of usurpation and despotism. Enquiry, and the improvement of the human mind, are now shaking to the center those bulwarks that have so long held mankind in thraldom".

Godwin was not a revolutionary in the vein of John Thelwall and the London Corresponding Society. A philosophical anarchist, he believed that change would come gradually and that there was no need for violent revolution. He argues that "the task which, for the present, should occupy the first rank in the thoughts of the friend of man is enquiry, communication, discussion". Godwin thus believed in individuals' desire to reason sincerely and truthfully with each other. In the 20th century, Jürgen Habermas developed this idea further.

However, paradoxes and contradictions surface throughout Political Justice. As McCann explains, "a faith in the ability of public opinion to progress towards enlightenment, based on its own exercise of reason, is constantly undone by actual forms of public action and political life, which for Godwin end up dangerously subsuming the individual into the collective". For example, Godwin criticizes public speeches because they rely on sentiment and the printing press because it can perpetuate dogma as well as enlighten.

The work begins with a list of eight principles which are expounded throughout the work. Generally, the principles can each be summarized as follows:

1. The object of moral and political discourse is how to maximize the amount and variety of pleasure and happiness.
2. Injustice and violence produced the demand for government, but due to its propensity toward war and despotism and its perpetuation of inequality, government has come to embody and perpetuate injustice.
3. Government's chief object is security, and it achieves this through abridging individual independence. This prevents the cultivation of the individual's happiness. One should aim to maintain general security, while minimizing such damages.
4. Justice must aim at producing the greatest sum of happiness and it requires impartiality. Justice is universal.
5. One's duty is to fulfill one's capacity to bring about the general advantage. One's right is to their share to this general advantage. Ordinarily, one's contribution to general advantage should be at their discretion. One's injury to the general good might sometimes warrant political superintendence.
6. One's actions are based on feelings rather than reason. Reason merely allows the comparison and balancing of different feelings. Reason, therefore, allows us to regulate our feelings, making its improvement the best method to improve our social condition.
7. Reason's clarity and strength depend on the cultivation of knowledge. The cultivation of knowledge is unlimited. Therefore, our social condition is capable of perpetual improvement; however, institutions calculated to give perpetuity to any particular mode of thinking, or condition of existence, are harmful.
8. The cultivation of happiness requires that we avoid prejudice and protect freedom of inquiry. It also requires leisure for intellectual cultivation, therefore extreme inequality is to be avoided.

== Variants ==
Godwin's Enquiry Concerning Political Justice has various editions. The editions were published in Godwin's lifetime. Due to Godwin's continuous revision of the text, three editions were released. The first edition was published in 1793, the second edition in 1796 and the third edition in 1798. Each of these editions was published by G.G and J. Robinson. Political Justice has a complex textual development due to these changes. The overall tones of these changes portray a move away from pure reason, yielding more towards the emotive feelings of mankind.

Peter Kropotkin, in his article on "Anarchism" for The Encyclopedia Britannica discusses the revisions from a far-left perspective, criticizing how new versions seemed to retract earlier, more radical, positions concerning property:

Speaking of property, he stated that the rights of every one 'to every substance capable of contributing to the benefit of a human being' must be regulated by justice alone: the substance must go 'to him who most wants it'. His conclusion was communism. Godwin, however, had not the courage to maintain his opinions. He entirely rewrote later on his chapter on property and mitigated his communist views in the second edition of Political Justice (8vo, 1796).

== Impact ==
Godwin's Enquiry Concerning Political Justice presents the first modern defense and articulation of anarchism. The book was revered by the first generation of Romantic poets, such as William Wordsworth and Samuel Taylor Coleridge, although they would later turn away from radicalism. However, as Romantic scholar Andrew McCann explains, "it is in the radicalism of Percy Shelley's work that Godwin's thinking exerted its greatest influence on the Romantic movement, and ... Shelley's work was most central to the resurgence of radical sentiment after the end of the Napoleonic Wars".

In 1798, the Reverend Thomas Malthus published An Essay on the Principle of Population, which was largely written as a refutation of the ideas of Godwin and the Marquis de Condorcet. Malthus argued that since population increases geometrically (i.e. doubling in size each generation), while production can only increase in a linear manner, then disease, famine, poverty and vice are inevitable. Consequently, Malthus criticised Political Justice for expounding unachievable utopianism. In 1820 Godwin answered with Of Population: An Enquiry Concerning the Power of Increase in the Numbers of Mankind which disputed Malthus' population growth predictions.

The work merited a place in Peter Kropotkin's overview of the history of anarchism that he wrote for The Encyclopedia Britannica.

It was Godwin, in his Enquiry concerning Political Justice (2 vols., 1793), who was the first to formulate the political and economical conceptions of anarchism, even though he did not give that name to the ideas developed in his remarkable work. Laws, he wrote, are not a product of the wisdom of our ancestors: they are the product of their passions, their timidity, their jealousies and their ambition. The remedy they offer is worse than the evils they pretend to cure.

== Manuscript ==
The surviving holograph manuscript for Political Justice is held in the Forster Collection at the Victoria and Albert Museum, along with several other works by Godwin. Following Godwin's death in 1836, many of the writer's manuscripts were bought at auction by the collector Dawson Turner. In 1859 the texts for Political Justice, Caleb Williams, Life of Chaucer, and History of the Commonwealth of England were all acquired by John Forster, who died in 1876. Forster's will stipulated that his extensive collection should be given to the South Kensington Museum after his wife's death. In the event, Eliza Ann Forster transferred the Godwin manuscripts to the Museum straight away.

The V&A's manuscripts for Political Justice and Caleb Williams were both digitised in 2017 and are now included in the Shelley-Godwin Archive.

== See also ==
- List of books about anarchism

== Bibliography ==
- McCann, Andrew. "Enquiry Concerning Political Justice and its Influence on Modern Morals and Manners". The Literary Encyclopedia. 8 January 2001. Retrieved on 20 April 2008.
- Pullen, J. M. "Malthus, (Thomas) Robert (1766–1834), political economist", Oxford Dictionary of National Biography, Oxford: Oxford University Press, 2004.
