= List of fictional baronets =

This is a list of fictional baronets — characters who appear in fiction as a baronet of the United Kingdom, England, Ireland or Great Britain.

First Name	Last name	Title of work	Format(s) (Date(s) of publication)	Author/creator
Sir Buckstone	Abbott	Summer Moonshine	Novel (1937)	P. G. Wodehouse
Sir Anthony	Absolute	The Rivals	Stage play (1775)	Richard Brinsley Sheridan
Sir Thomas	de Beauchamp	1635: The Weaver's Code	Novel (2024)	Eric Flint and Jody Lynn Nye
Sir George	Alleyn	Chief Inspector Alleyn series	Novel(s) (1934)	Ngaio Marsh
Sir Thomas	Arkenshaw	For The Good Of The State	Novel (1986)	Anthony Price
Sir Michael	Audley	Lady Audley's Secret	Novel (1862)	Mary Elizabeth Braddon
Sir Charles; Sir Henry	Baskerville; Baskerville (distant relation)	The Hound of the Baskervilles	Novel (1902)	Arthur Conan Doyle
Sir Paul	Berowne	A Taste for Death	Novel (1986)	P.D. James
Sir Thomas	Bertram	Mansfield Park	Novel (1814)	Jane Austen
Sir Severus; Sir John; Sir Anthony	Blake; Bullock; Strallan	Downton Abbey	Public television series (2010)	Julian Fellowes
Sir Percy	Blakeney	The Scarlet Pimpernel	Novel (1905)	Baroness Orczy
Sir Hilary	Bray	On Her Majesty's Secret Service	Novel (1963)	Ian Fleming
Sir Felix	Carbury	The Way We Live Now	Novel (1875)	Anthony Trollope
Sir James	Catton	Saltburn	Movie (2023)	Emerald Fennell
Sir Clifford	Chatterley	Lady Chatterley's Lover	Novel (1928)	D.H. Lawrence
Sir Gervase	Chevenix-Gore	Dead Man's Mirror (Poirot)	Novella (1937)	Agatha Christie
Sir Robert	Chiltern	An Ideal Husband	Stage play (1894)	Oscar Wilde
Sir Philip	Chestrum	Hermsprong; or, Man as He Is Not	Novel (1796)	Robert Bage
Sir Phillip	Crane	To Sir Phillip, With Love; Bridgerton	Novel(s) (2000); Netflix series (2020)	Julia Quinn
Sir Pitt; Sir Pitt	Crawley; Crawley (son)	Vanity Fair	Novel (1847)	William Makepeace Thackeray
Sir George	Crofts	Mrs. Warren's Profession	Stage play (1893)	George Bernard Shaw
Sir Leicester	Dedlock	Bleak House	Novel (1852)	Charles Dickens
Sir Walter	Elliot	Persuasion	Novel (1817)	Jane Austen
Sir Nicholas	Fandorin	Adventures of the Magister	Novel(s) (2001-2009)	Boris Akunin
Sir Anthony	Ferndale	The Black Moth	Novel (1921)	Georgette Heyer
Sir Austin	Feverel	The Ordeal of Richard Feverel	Novel (1859)	George Meredith
Sir Charles	Fraith	Agatha Raisin series	Novel(s) (1992-2021); Radio play Television series	M.C.Beaton
Sir Gilbert	Galbraith	Sir Gibbie	Novel (1879)	George MacDonald
Sir Percival	Glyde	The Woman in White	Novel (1859)	Wilkie Collins
Sir Julius	Hanbury	"The Ghost in the Machine," Inspector Morse	Television series (1989)	Colin Dexter
Sir Julian; Sir Hayden	Harker; Harker (son and successor)	Bodies	Television limited series (2023)	Paul Tomalin
Sir Jocelyn	Harris	Zulu Hart	Novel (2009)	Saul David
Sir Topham	Hatt	The Railway Series	Short story series (1945-1972)	Rev. W. Awdry
Sir Reginald	Lavington	"The Adventure of the Black Baronet", The Exploits of Sherlock Holmes	Short story (1954)	Adrian Conan Doyle and John Dickson Carr
Sir Alan	Lewrie	The Invasion Year	Novel (2011)	Dewey Lambdin
Sir Hugo	Mallinger	Daniel Deronda	Novel (1876)	George Eliot
Sir Bale	Mardykes	"The Haunted Baronet", Chronicles of Golden Friars	Novella (1871)	Sheridan Le Fanu
Sir Ruthven; Sir Despard	Murgatroyd; Murgatroyd (younger brother); Ghost chorus	Ruddigore	Stage play (1887)	Gilbert and Sullivan
Sir Gregory	Parsloe	Blandings books	Short story collections (1935-53)	P. G. Wodehouse
Sir Marmaduke	Pointdextre	The Sorcerer	Stage play (1877)	Gilbert and Sullivan
Sir Ross	Poldark	The Twisted Sword	Novel (1990)	Winston Graham
Sir Roger; Sir Louis Philippe	Scatcherd; Scatcherd (son)	Doctor Thorne	Novel (1858)	Anthony Trollope
Sir Thomas	Sharpe	Crimson Peak	Film (2015)	Guillermo del Toro
Sir Adam	Sinclair	The Adept series	Novel(s) (1991-6)	Katherine Kurtz and Deborah Turner Harris
Sir Robert	Smithson	The French Lieutenant's Woman	Novel (1969); Film (1981)	John Fowles
Sir Perceval	Stuyvesant	Wheels	Novel (1971)	Arthur Hailey
Commander Sir Charles	Swann	Brannigan	Film (1975)	Douglas Hickox
Sir Helmsley	Thwarte	The Buccaneers	Novel (1937)	Edith Wharton
Sir Francis; Sir George	Uproar; Uproar	The Ghosts of Motley Hall	Television series (1976-8)	Richard Carpenter
Sir Gregory	Upshott	The Green Man	Film (1956)	Frank Launder and Sidney Gilliat
Sir Dudley	Valance	The Stranger's Child	Novel (2011)	Alan Hollinghurst
Sir Arthur	Wardour	The Antiquary	Novel (1816)	Walter Scott
Sir Percy	Ware-Armitage	Those Magnificent Men in their Flying Machines	Film (1965)	Ken Annakin
Sir Stanley	Winthrop	When Maidens Mourn	Novel (2012)	C.S. Harris
Sir Integral (Fairbrook Wingate) Sir Arthur	Hellsing	Hellsing	Manga (1997-2008) Anime (2001-2002) OVA (2006-2012)	Kouta Hirano

== See also ==
- List of fictional nobility
