= Bomb vessel =

Sailing naval ship

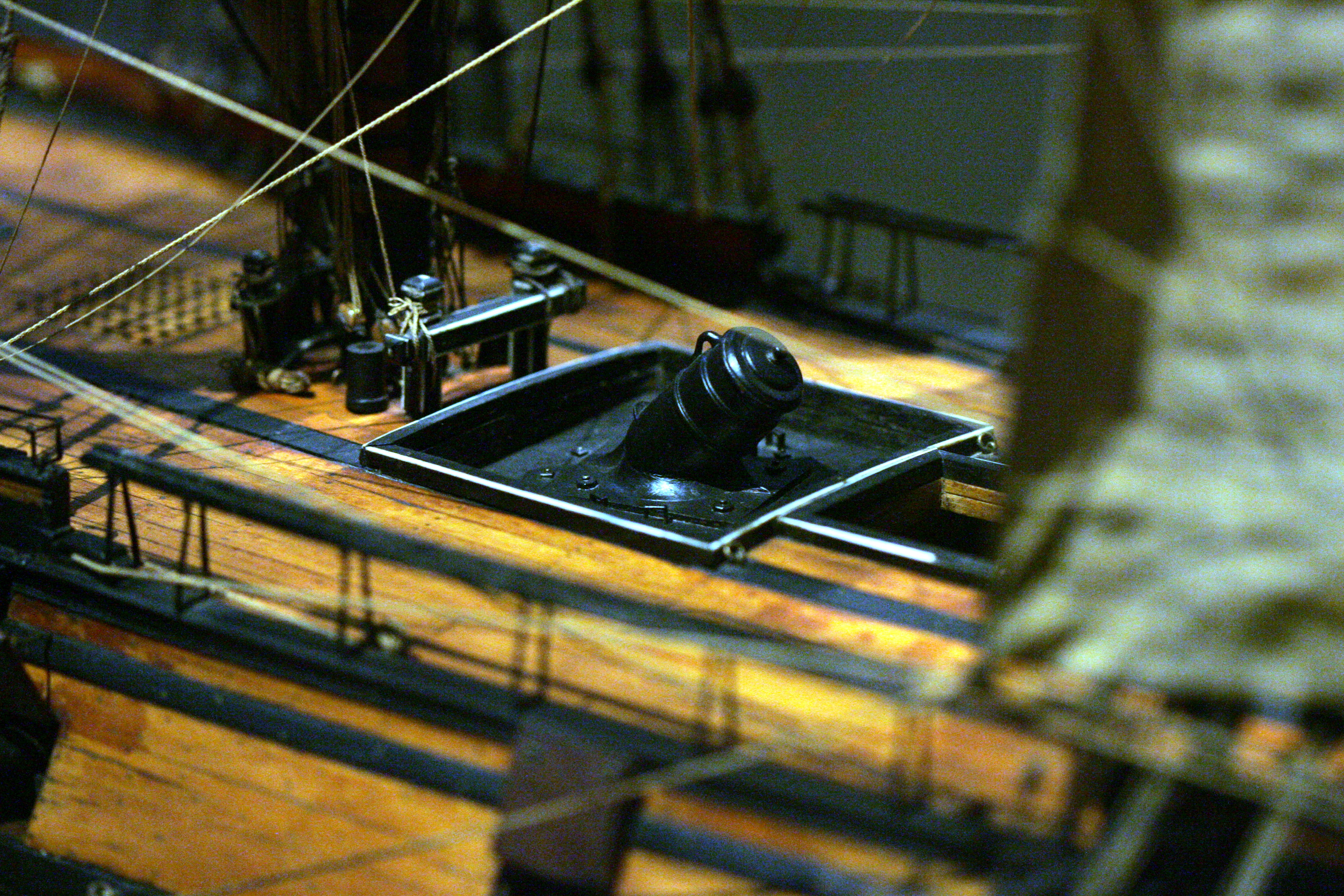
Model of a mortar aboard Foudroyante, a French bomb vessel of the 1800s

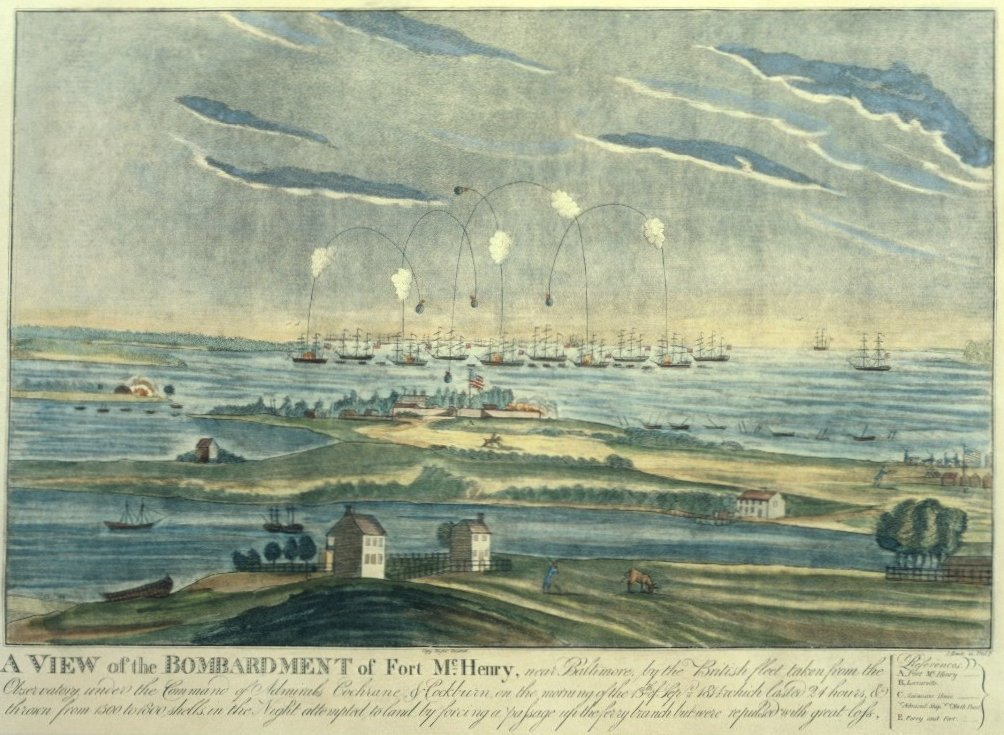
British bomb vessels attacking Fort McHenry during the Battle of Baltimore in 1814

A bomb vessel, bomb ship, bomb ketch, or simply bomb was a type of wooden sailing naval ship. Its primary armament was not cannons (long guns or carronades) – although bomb vessels carried a few cannons for self-defence – but mortars mounted forward near the bow and elevated to a high angle, and projecting their fire in a ballistic arc. Explosive shells (also called bombs at the time) or carcasses were employed rather than solid shot. Bomb vessels were specialized ships designed for bombarding (hence the name) fixed positions on land. In the 20th century, this naval gunfire support role was carried out by the most similar purpose-built World War I- and II-era monitors, but also by other warships now firing long-range explosive shells.

== Development ==
The first recorded deployment of bomb vessels by the English was for the siege of Calais in 1347 when Edward III deployed single-deck ships with bombardes and other artillery. The first specialised bomb vessels were built towards the end of the 17th century, based on the designs of Bernard Renau d'Eliçagaray, and used by the French Navy. They were first called galiote à bombe (a word derived from the Dutch galliot, denoting a short, beamy vessel well suited for the powerful downward recoil of its weapons). Five such vessels were used to shell Algiers in 1682 destroying the land forts, and killing some 700 defenders. Two years later the French repeated their success at Genoa. The early French bomb vessels had two forward-pointing mortars fixed side-by-side on the foredeck. To aim these weapons, the entire ship was rotated by letting out or pulling in a spring anchor. The range was usually controlled by adjusting the gunpowder charge. The French later adopted the word bombarde for this vessel, but it should not be confused with the horizontal fire, stone throwing bombard of earlier centuries.

The French design was copied by the Royal Navy, who continued to refine the class over the next century or more, after Huguenot exiles brought designs over to England and the United Provinces. The side-by-side, forward-pointing mortars were replaced in the British designs by mortars mounted on the centerline on revolving platforms. These platforms were supported by strong internal wooden framework to transmit the forces of firing the weapons to the hull. The interstices of the framework were used as storage areas for ammunition.

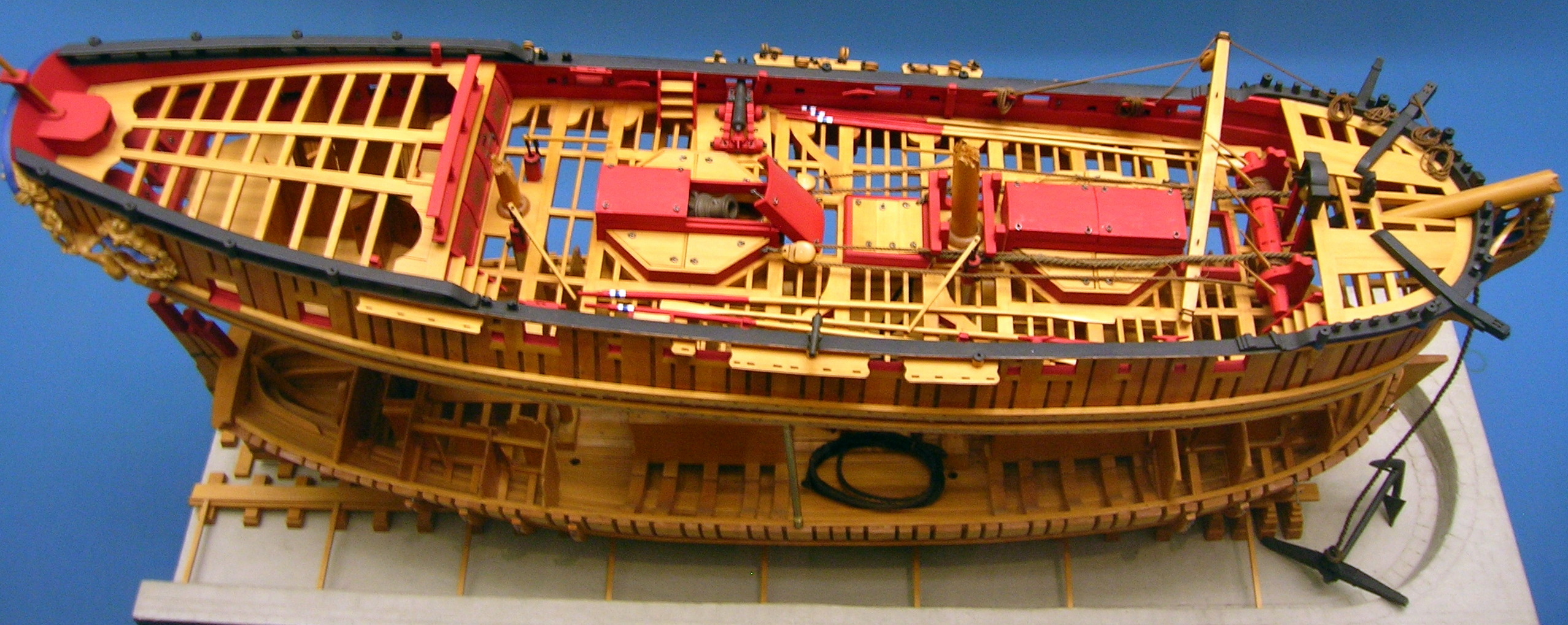
Model of a 'Granado' bomb vessel, launched in 1742. It has two mortars inline. National Maritime Museum, London.

Early bomb vessels were rigged as ketches with two masts. They were awkward vessels to handle, in part because bomb ketches typically had the masts stepped farther aft than would have been normal in other vessels of similar rig, in order to accommodate the mortars forward and provide a clear area for their forwards fire. As a result, by the 1800s British bomb vessels were designed as full-rigged ships with three masts, and two mortars, one between each neighboring pair of masts. The full rig also meant that bomb vessels could be used as escort sloops between bombardment missions; in 1805 the Acheron bomb along with the Arrow sloop were both lost in a defence of their convoy. Bomb vessels often had the front rigging made of chain, to better withstand the muzzle blast of the mortars.

Mortars were the only kind of naval armament to fire explosive shells rather than solid shot until the invention of the Paixhans gun. Since it was considered dangerous to have large stocks of shells on board the ships that were firing them, and because the reinforced mortar platforms occupied so much space below decks, bomb vessels were usually accompanied by a tender to carry ammunition as well as the ordnance officers in charge of firing the mortars. However, as naval warfare became more advanced, bomb ships were also accompanied by frigates to protect them from direct assault by faster, smaller vessels.

Bomb vessels were traditionally named after volcanoes, or given other names suggestive of explosive qualities. Some were also given names associated with the underworld. Vessels of other types which were later converted to bomb ships generally retained their original names.

Bomb vessels were highly specialized and expensive to fit out and maintain, and only marginally suited for their secondary role as cruisers. Because bomb vessels were built with extremely strong hulls to withstand the recoil of the mortars, several were converted in peacetime as ships for exploration of the Arctic and Antarctic regions, where pack ice and icebergs were a constant menace. Most famously, these ships included HMS Erebus and HMS Terror. In this case, the volcanoes – Mount Erebus and Mount Terror on Ross Island in Antarctica – were named after the ships, instead of vice versa.

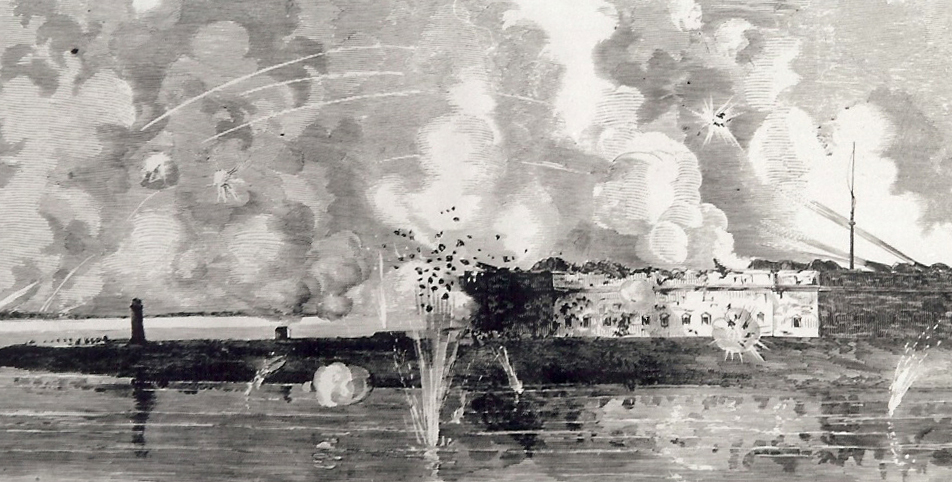
Fort Pulaski under fire. 1 May 1862.

Although horizontal fire naval guns propelling explosive shells had entered all major navies by the 1840s (see Paixhans gun), there was still room for a specialized vessel on occasion. During the American Civil War, the Union fleet included armored gunboats armed with 13 inch mortars; the weapon weighed 17,250 lbs and its bedding another 4,500 lbs. They fired 204-lb shells, with a bursting charge of 7 lbs of gunpowder, and had a range of three miles. At this distance, the projectile spent 30 seconds in flight. They were used to attack several forts, for example Fort Pulaski, Georgia.

== Notable bomb vessels and actions ==
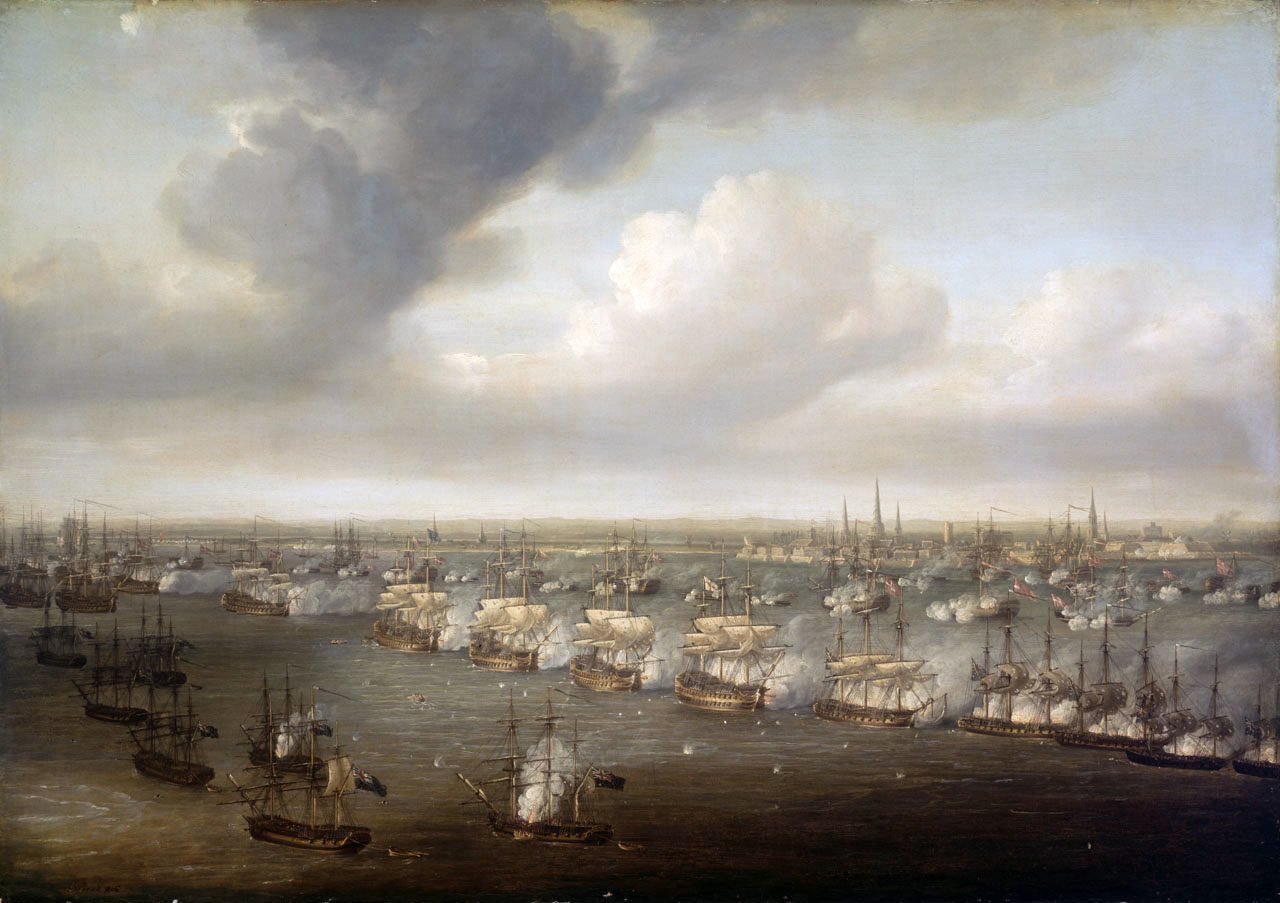
In this painting of the Battle of Copenhagen (1801) by Nicholas Pocock, Royal Navy bomb vessels in the left foreground fire over the British and Danish lines of battle into Copenhagen in the background

- The bomb vessels Racehorse and Carcass were further strengthened for an expedition of discovery to the North Pole in the 1770s. The uncompleted expedition included a young Horatio Nelson.
- Bomb vessels Discovery, Explosion, Hecla, Sulphur, Terror (1784), Volcano, and Zebra participated in the First Battle of Copenhagen in 1801.
- Thunder, Vesuvius, Aetna, and Zebra participated in the Second Battle of Copenhagen in 1807.
- Thunder and Aetna additionally participated in the Battle of the Basque Roads in 1808 (this action was also notable for including three rocket vessels in support of the bombs).
- The "bombs bursting in air" recorded by Francis Scott Key at the Battle of Baltimore in 1814 were provided by the Volcano, Meteor, Devastation, Aetna, and a new Terror.
- Another Hecla and her sister ship Fury were used by William Edward Parry on a series of voyages to the Arctic between 1819 and 1827.
- During the Battle of Veracruz in 1838, the bomb vessels Cyclope and Vulcain fired most of the shells used by the French, and scored decisive hits on Mexican ammunition depots.
- HMS Erebus and HMS Terror (1813) served as polar exploration vessels. Terror had been used by George Back in his 1836 Arctic expedition, in Sir James Clark Ross's own expedition of 1840 to the Antarctic, before they were lost on Sir John Franklin's lost expedition of 1845.

== In fiction ==
Commodore Hornblower (published 1945), a Horatio Hornblower novel written by C. S. Forester, features several actions by British bomb vessels. The text includes a highly detailed account of the procedures used to load the mortars and aim, which involved anchoring fore-and-aft, receiving range corrections from another vessel, precisely adjusting the aim using an anchor cable attached to a windlass, and by using fine adjustments in the amount of gun powder to correct the range. However, Forester erred in describing the vessels as ketches, which by the early 19th century had been replaced by full-rigged ships, and in assigning the management of the mortars to Naval officers, rather than the Royal Marine Artillery which had been formed for this specific purpose. A later book, Hornblower in the West Indies, features a small portable "ship's mortar" mounted in a boat, used to bombard a target during a riverine operation.

In a fictionalized account, war correspondent, author, and yachtsman G. A. Henty describes in vivid detail the deployment of ten bomb-ketches by the Spanish besiegers during the final period of the siege of Gibraltar.

In The Ramage Touch by Dudley Pope (published 1979), Captain Lord Ramage and the crew of the frigate Calypso capture two bomb ketches, which they subsequently use to thwart a French invasion plan in the Mediterranean. Like the Hornblower books, The Ramage Touch describes in great detail the technical aspects of employing a bomb vessel during the Napoleonic era.

In H.M.S. Cockerell by Dewey Lambdin (published 1995), First Lieutenant Alan Lewrie is set ashore by his vindictive captain, for 'land service' during the siege of Toulon. There Admiral Goodall gives him a bomb ketch, which he commands for several weeks until it is blown out of the water and sunk by a young Colonel of artillery named Buonaparte.

== See also ==
- List of bomb vessels of the Royal Navy
- Paixhans gun
