= The Ramage Touch =

1979 novel by Dudley Pope

- 1st edition hardback
- Author: Dudley Pope
- Language: English
- Series: Lord Ramage novels
- Genre: Naval historical novels
- Publisher: Secker & Warburg (first ed.)
- Publication date: 1979
- Publication place: United Kingdom
- Media type: Print (hardback & paperback)
- Preceded by: Ramage and the Rebels
- Followed by: Ramage's Signal

The Ramage Touch, is an historical novel by Dudley Pope, set during the French Revolutionary Wars. It is the tenth of the Ramage novels, following on from Ramage and the Rebels.

== Plot ==
Ramage has been given orders for an independent fighting cruise of the Mediterranean to capture sink or destroy as many enemy ships as he can and generally create havoc. His ship, HMS Calypso is perhaps the only British presence in the Mediterranean at the time. The Calypso is a former French frigate. With her French lines and still rigged with French-cut sails, she is well suited to such an endeavor. The novel opens at night, with the Calypso sailing off the Tuscan coast, near Punta Ala. Two oddly rigged ships are sighted coming to anchor for the night in the lee of the headland.

Calypso's arrival at the same anchorage later that night rouses no alarm and the two ships are easily boarded and captured. Their strange rig is because they are bomb ketches. Each is armed with two large calibre mortars that fire exploding shells, intended to batter shore installations. Interrogating the senior captain, Ramage learns that they were to rendezvous with two French frigates further down the coast at Porto Ercole – approximately 80 kilometres (50 mi) sailing. The frigates are to embark troops and the ships are to sail to the western Mediterranean. It appears likely that an invasion force is assembling. Regardless, Ramage sees an opportunity to disrupt Bonaparte's plans. He mans the two ketches from his crew and quickly trains them to proficiently employ the unfamiliar mortars.

Ramage sails his ships toward the peninsular of Monte Argentario, with Porto Ercole on its southern side. Nearing Monte Argentario, three French frigates are sighted approaching Porto Ercole. While Ramage's ships wait off the northern side of Monte Argentario, Ramage, Martin and Orsini, disguised as gypsies, go ashore to gather more intelligence on the situation at Porto Ercole. They are captured but Jackson and Rossi have followed them (without orders) and help them escape.

Returned to his ship, Ramage attacks Porto Ercole. The bomb ketches bombard the port as the frigates are moored and loading troops and their equipment. One frigate is destroyed, the second is severely damaged but the third sails clear of the port with Calypso in pursuit. The Frenchman was damaged by bomb blast and the hard chase has worked planks free. She strikes her colours and Ramage boards the sinking ship but she is beyond saving. Ramage is able to rescue many of the crew, including Rear-admiral Poitier, commanding the French ships. He has also captured the admirals orders, which had not been thrown overboard in the confusion. He was able to confirm that Bonaparte had planned a second invasion of Egypt; however, Poitier received orders at Porto Ercole that the invasion was cancelled. The soldiers being embarked were to garrison other French conquests.

At Porto Ercole, the damaged frigate was abandoned by the French and cut out by the bomb ketches to become a prize. The saved French prisoners were released on parole, Wagstaffe was given command to sail the prize frigate to Gibraltar and the Calypso would continue her four-month cruise of the Mediterranean.

== Characters ==
- Nicholas Ramage - post-captain commanding the frigate, HMS Calypso.
- Gianna the Marchesa di Volterri - an Italian noblewoman who fled from the French conquest of the Italian kingdoms in Ramage and lover of Lieutenant Ramage. She does not appear but is frequently mentioned.
- Paolo Orsini – nephew and heir to the marchesa's title. Midshipman on the Calypso.
- James Aitken – Calypso's first lieutenant.
- Wagstaffe – Calypso's second lieutenant.
- Kenton – Calypso's third lieutenant.
- William "Blower" Martin – Calypso's Fourth lieutenant. Nicknamed because he plays the flute.
- Lieutenant Rennick – officer commanding the Calypso's marine detachment.
- Henry Southwick – master of the Calypso
- Bowen – medical officer of the Calypso
- Thomas Jackson - Ramage's American coxswain.
- Will Stafford - a London-born crewman who was a locksmith and occasional housebreaker before being pressed into the Navy.
- Alberto Rossi - a Genoese crewman and close comrade of Jackson and Stafford.
- James Maxton - one of Ramage's crewmen. He is an escaped slave from Grenada.
