= Great Mutiny =

Great Mutiny could refer to:

- Indian Rebellion of 1857
- Great Naval Mutiny 1797 - Spithead and Nore mutinies
