= Spithead and Nore mutinies =

Two mutinies by British sailors in 1797

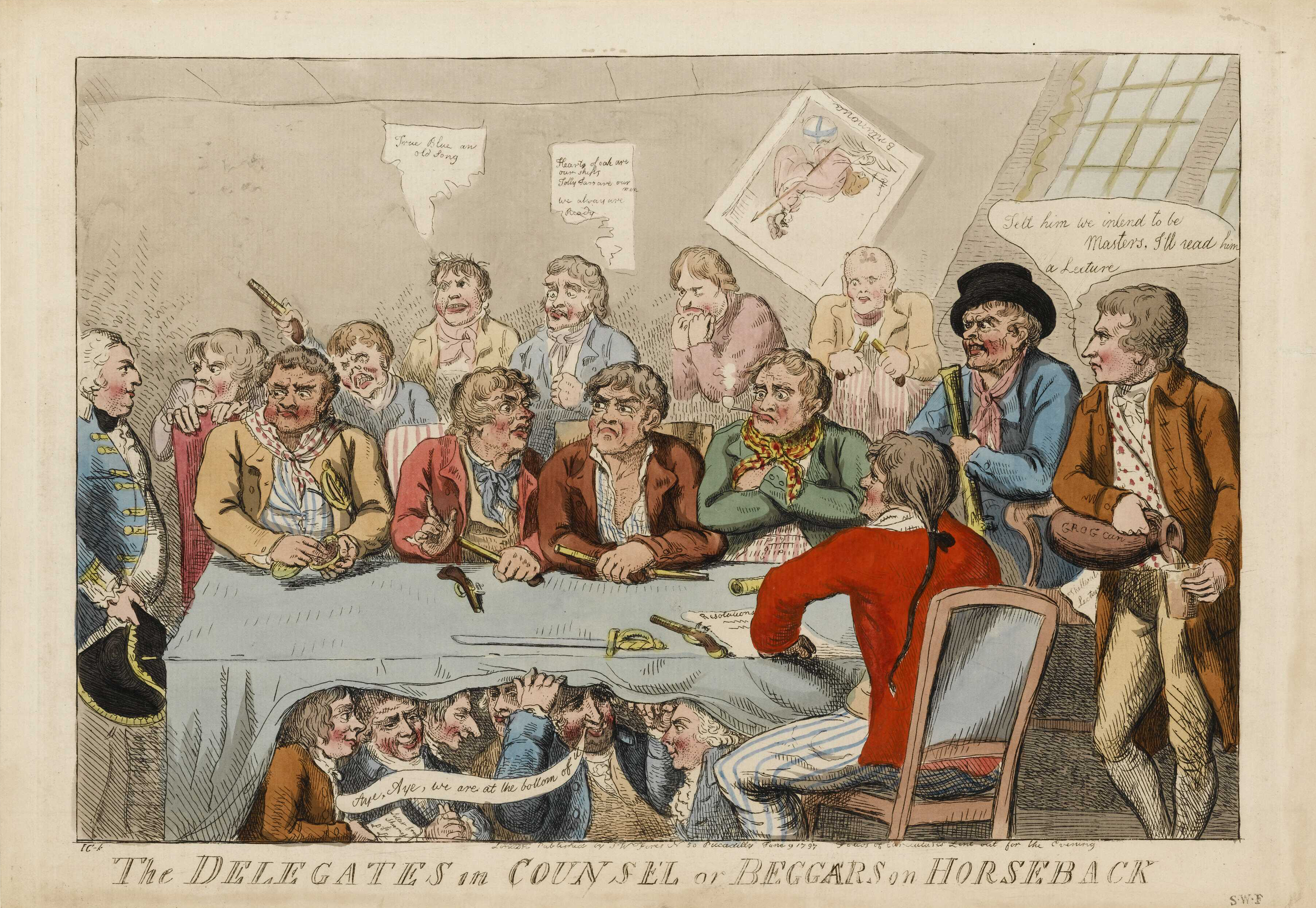
The Delegates in Council, or beggars on horseback, a contemporaneous caricature

The Spithead and Nore mutinies were two major mutinies by sailors of the Royal Navy in 1797. They were the first in an increasing series of outbreaks of maritime radicalism in the Atlantic World. Despite their temporal proximity, the mutinies differed in character. The Spithead mutiny was a simple, peaceful, successful strike action to address economic grievances, while the Nore mutiny was a more radical action, articulating political ideals as well, which failed.

The mutinies were extremely concerning for Britain, because at the time the country was at war with Revolutionary France, and the Navy was the main component of the war effort. There were also concerns among the government that the mutinies might be part of wider attempts at revolutionary sedition instigated by societies such as the London Corresponding Society and the United Irishmen.

== Spithead ==
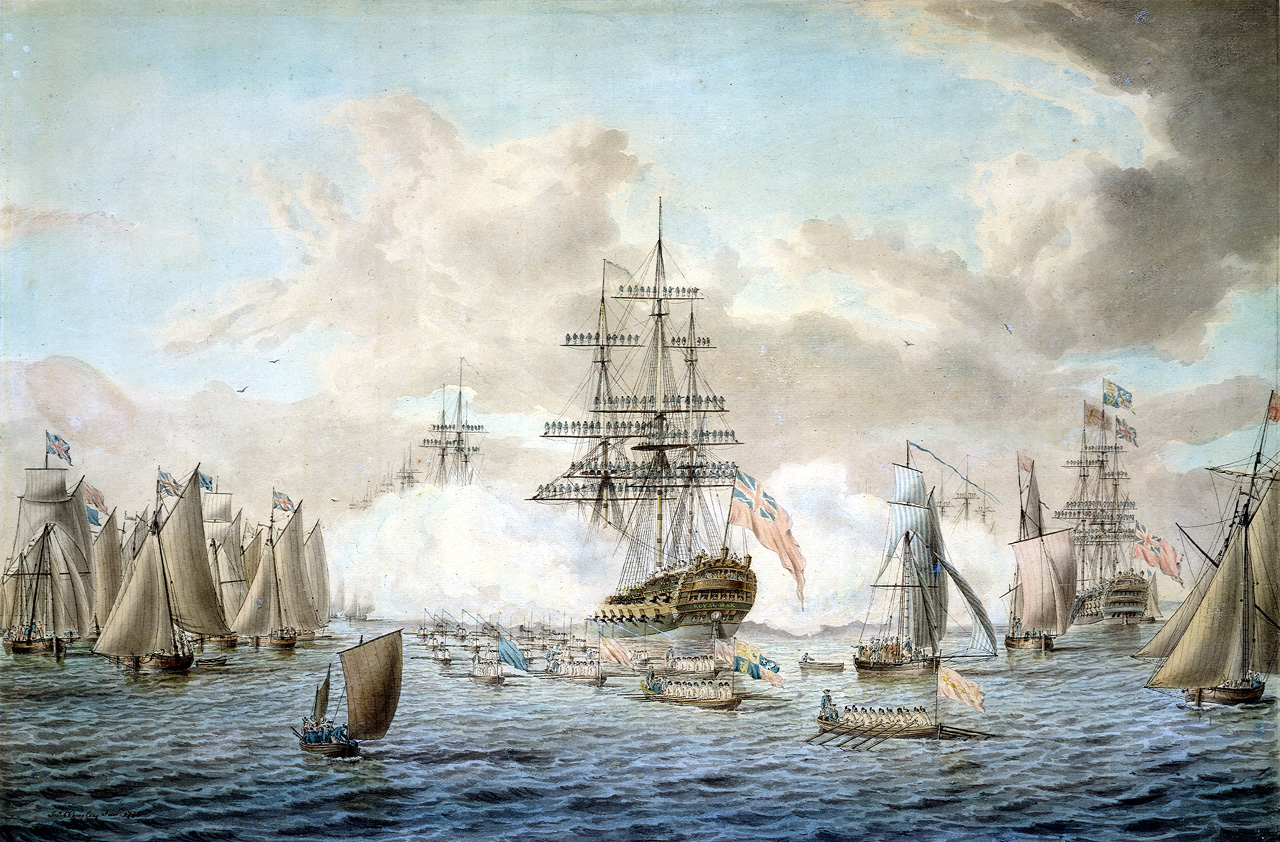
George III conducting a fleet review at Spithead on 22 June 1773

The mutiny at Spithead (an anchorage near Portsmouth) lasted from 16 April to 15 May 1797. Sailors on 16 ships in the Channel Fleet, commanded by Admiral Lord Bridport, protested against the living conditions aboard Royal Navy vessels and demanded a pay raise, better victualling, increased shore leave, and compensation for sickness and injury. On 26 April a supportive mutiny broke out on 15 ships in Plymouth, who sent delegates to Spithead to take part in negotiations.

Seamen's pay rates had been established in 1658, and because of the stability of wages and prices, they were still reasonable as late as the 1756–1763 Seven Years' War; however, high inflation during the last decades of the 18th century had severely eroded the real value of the pay. Pay raises had meanwhile been granted to the army, militia, and naval officers. At the same time, the practice of coppering the submerged part of hulls, which had started in 1761, meant that British warships no longer had to return to port frequently to have their hulls scraped, and the additional time at sea greatly altered the rhythm and difficulty of seamen's work. The Royal Navy had not made adjustments for any of these changes, and was slow to understand their effects on its crews. Impressment (a common practice) meant that some of the seamen were onboard ship against their will. Finally, the new wartime quota system meant that crews had many landsmen from inshore (including some convicted criminals sent in lieu of punishment) who did not mix well with the career seamen, leading to discontented ships' companies.

The mutineers were led by elected delegates and tried to negotiate with the Admiralty for two weeks, focusing their demands on better pay, the abolition of the 14-ounce "purser's pound" (the ship's purser was allowed to keep one eighth of every 16-ounce true pound as a perquisite), and the removal of a handful of unpopular officers. Neither flogging nor impressment was mentioned in the mutineers' demands, even though ending impressment had been one of the motivations for the mutiny. The mutineers maintained regular naval routine and discipline aboard their ships (mostly with their regular officers), allowed some ships to leave for convoy escort duty or patrols, and promised to suspend the mutiny and go to sea immediately if French ships were spotted heading for English shores.

Because of mistrust, especially over pardons for the mutineers, the negotiations broke down, and minor incidents broke out, with several unpopular officers sent to shore and others treated with signs of deliberate disrespect. When the situation calmed, Admiral Lord Howe intervened to negotiate an agreement that issued a royal pardon for all crews, reassignment of some of the unpopular officers, and a pay raise and abolition of the purser's pound. Afterwards, the mutiny was to become nicknamed the "breeze at Spithead".

== The Nore ==
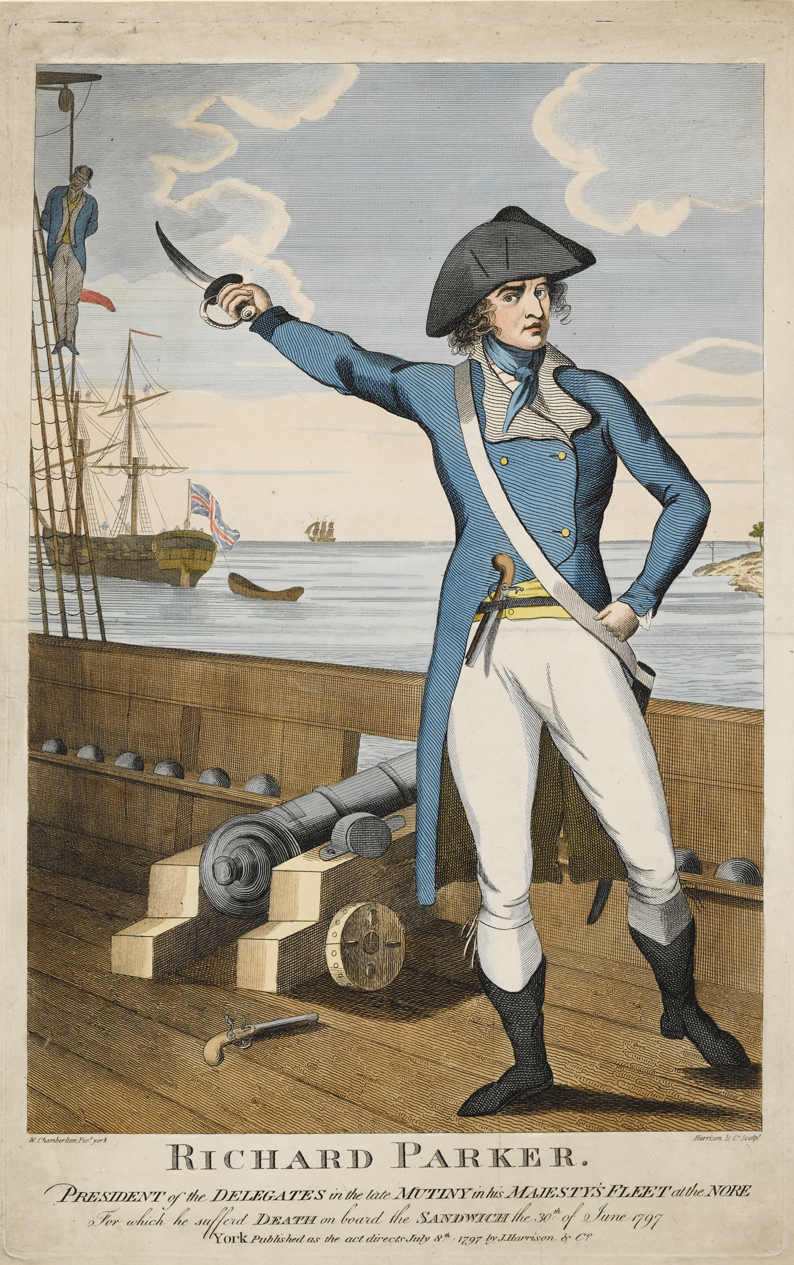
Illustration of a living Richard Parker pointing to his hanged corpse

Inspired by the example of their comrades at Spithead, the sailors at the Nore, an anchorage in the Thames Estuary, also mutinied, on 12 May 1797, when the crew of Sandwich seized control of the ship. Several other ships in the same location followed this example, though others slipped away during the mutiny despite gunfire from the ships that were attempting to use force to hold the mutiny together. The mutineers had been unable to organise easily because the ships were scattered along the Nore (and were not all part of a unified fleet, as at Spithead), but they quickly elected delegates for each ship.

Richard Parker was elected "President of the Delegates of the Fleet". According to him, he was nominated and elected without his knowledge. Parker was a former master's mate who was disrated and court-martialled in December 1793 and re-enlisted in the Navy as a seaman in early 1797, where he came to serve aboard the brig-sloop Hound. A list of eight demands was formulated on 20 May 1797, and presented to Admiral Charles Buckner. The demands mainly involved pardons, increased pay, and modification of the Articles of War, eventually expanding to a demand that the King dissolve Parliament and make immediate peace with France. These demands infuriated the Admiralty, which offered nothing except a pardon (plus the concessions already made at Spithead) in exchange for an immediate return to duty.

Captain Sir Erasmus Gower commissioned HMS Neptune (98 guns) in the upper Thames and put together a flotilla of fifty loyal ships to prevent the mutineers moving on the city of London. It was largely fear of this blockade moving down river that made the mutineers reconsider their actions and begin to waver.

The mutineers expanded their initial grievances and blockaded London, preventing merchant vessels from entering the port, and the principals made plans to sail their ships to France, alienating the regular English sailors and losing more and more ships as the mutiny progressed. This gave rise to a fear in the Admiralty that ships still at sea might be taken to France, but that was generally unfounded. When word of the mutiny reached the squadron under Sir John Borlase Warren, cruising off Ushant, the crew of HMS Galatea seized her, confining her captain, Richard Goodwin Keats, but the whole squadron nonetheless followed orders to return to Plymouth. There was seemingly no thought of treason – the men just wanted improvements in their conditions. When they returned to shore Keats was released and once prize money was secured and other matters of pay were settled, they returned to their station. Although the port of Brest was unwatched for some weeks the French missed the opportunity to get to sea.

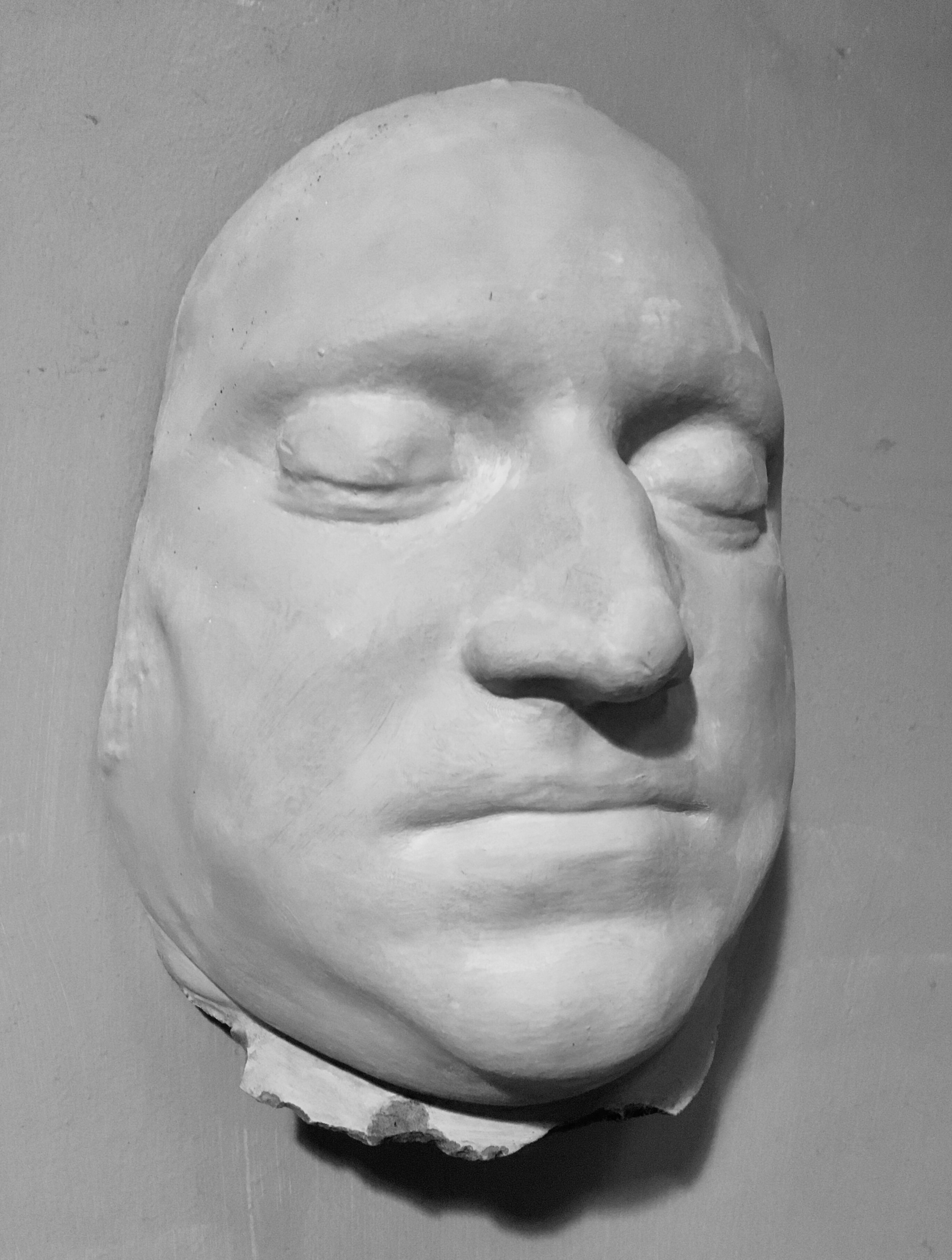
Death mask of Parker taken shortly after he was hanged

On 5 June, Parker issued an order that merchant ships be allowed to pass the blockade, and only Royal Navy victualling (i.e., supply) ships be detained. The ostensible reason provided in the order was that "the release of the merchant vessels would create a favourable impression on shore", although this decision may have had more to do with such a wide and complex undertaking as interdicting all the merchant traffic on the busy Thames. After the successful resolution of the Spithead mutiny, the government and the Admiralty were not inclined to make further concessions, particularly as they felt some leaders of the Nore mutiny had political aims beyond improving pay and living conditions. The mutineers were denied food and water, and when Parker hoisted the signal for the ships to sail to France, all of the remaining ships refused to follow.

Meanwhile, Captain Charles Cunningham of HMS Clyde, which was there for a refit, persuaded his crew to return to duty and slipped off to Sheerness. This was seen as a signal to others to do likewise, and eventually, most ships slipped their anchors and deserted (some under fire from the mutineers), and the mutiny failed. Parker was quickly convicted of treason and piracy and hanged from the yardarm of Sandwich, the vessel where the mutiny had started. In the reprisals that followed, 29 were hanged, 29 were imprisoned, and nine were flogged, while others were sentenced to transportation to Australia. One such was surgeon's mate William Redfern who became a respected surgeon and landowner in New South Wales. The majority of men involved in the mutiny were not punished at all, which was lenient by the standards of the time.

After the Nore mutiny, Royal Navy vessels no longer rang five bells in the last dog watch, as that had been the signal to begin the mutiny.

== Alleged role of the United Irishmen ==
The authorities were more than ready to see in the mutinies not only the hand of English radicals but also, among the large contingent of Irish sailors, the hand of the United Irishmen. Much was made of Valentine Joyce, among the delegates at Spithead, described by Edmund Burke as a "seditious Belfast clubist".

That the Valentine Joyce in question was Irish and a republican has been disputed, and while that "rebellious paper, the Northern Star" (from Belfast) may have circulated as reported among the mutineers, no evidence has emerged of a concerted United Irish plot to subvert the fleet. In Ireland there was talk of seizing British warships as part of a general insurrection, but it was only after the Spithead and Nore mutinies that United Irishmen awoke to "surprising effectiveness" of formulating sedition within the Royal Navy.

HMS Defiance, which had been part of the "floating republic" at Spithead, did see United Irish oaths administered (according to court-martial evidence) in a further mutinous conspiracy during the Irish rebellion in the early summer of 1798. Eleven of the crew were hanged and ten sentenced to transportation.

== Fairness and ‘Good Usage’ ==
A new interpretation of the Spithead and Nore mutinies has identified the sailors’ perceptions of fair treatment (which they called ‘good usage’) as being central to the causation of these mutinies. Traditionally, one of the greatest challenges to understanding the Spithead and Nore mutinies has been the inconsistent and contradictory rhetoric and behavior of the sailors observed during both mutinies. For example, E.P. Thompson wrote of the ‘wild and extravagant nature of their changes in mood’, as the sailors might appear loyal and conciliatory one day but seditious and confrontational the next. Easton has argued that an effective way to reconcile these contradictions is to view prolonged mutinies of this kind as a form of complex negotiation process, within which a variety of strategies could be used over time. Depending on the sailors' sense of hope or frustration at the progress (or lack thereof) that their cause was making, their behaviour and language would vary over time. In this way, the Spithead and Nore mutinies were not fully developed at their inception; each was the product of a process of attempted negotiation with the state.

According to this interpretation, the grievances that drove the sailors to mutiny in 1797 were not based on dissatisfaction towards the absolute form of naval conditions themselves, but a perception that elements of these conditions were unjust or unfair relative to the treatment received by other groups or customary expectations. This feature is observed in the mutineers' key demands. For example, although the Spithead sailors' petitions complained of stagnant wages and rising prices, they disagreed significantly on the scale of those price rises. By contrast, all of these petitions stated that 'It is now upwards of two years since your Petitioners observed with pleasure the Augmentation which had been made to pay of the Army and Militia [...] naturally expecting that they should in their turn experience the same Munificence but alas no Notice has been taken of them'. Coupled with the pay increase for naval lieutenants in 1796 and the planned increase for naval captains in 1797, this suggests that the sailors were not aggrieved by the specific rate of naval pay so much as the fact that they alone seemed neglected and forgotten, in spite of their key role in the nation's defence. In December 1796, Captain Thomas Pakenham had written to the Admiralty to warn of this growing sentiment among the seamen and called for their pay to be raised, but no action was taken. Similarly, in the case of the sailors' demands about naval food, it was specifically the dishonest scales, weights, and measures that they objected to (the purser's eighth). This was due to the sense of insult and unfulfilled entitlement resulting from being served a 'pound' of provisions weighing only fourteen rather than the full sixteen ounces. Likewise, on the matter of naval punishment, neither the structure of discipline nor flogging were the object of complaint for the Spithead sailors (and the mutineers made use of both themselves while in control of their ships). Instead, they sought the targeted removal of specific officers they considered inconsistent, unpredictable, or excessive in their exercise of discipline. In all three cases (wages, food, and discipline), perceived 'insult' was more of a motivation for mutiny than any tangible 'injury' felt by the sailors.

Another notable aspect of this new interpretation is the claim that the Spithead and Nore mutinies were, at first, far more similar than has generally been acknowledged. Although they eventually diverged dramatically and the Nore mutiny took on a far more radical aspect than Spithead, it is argued that this divergence was not inevitable and was the product of contrasting government policy. Whereas the state quickly entered meaningful negotiations with the Spithead sailors, they resolutely refused any negotiation with their counterparts at the Nore, as they feared creating a precedent that might encourage frequent future mutinies. Therefore, the general trend at Spithead was a hopeful dialogue that encouraged conciliation and compromise. By contrast, the Nore sailors were compelled to take a more confrontational approach to attempt to force the state to begin negotiations. This was ultimately counter-productive because each escalatory action by the Nore mutineers merely alienated and enraged the state further. At Spithead, the onset of negotiations allowed the leading mutineers to maintain the unity and discipline of their cause quite easily due to the likely prospect of gaining concessions. Without such progress, and the sustaining hope it created, it was more difficult for the leading Nore mutineers to hold their mutiny together. One strategy they relied upon was to increase the number and severity of their demands, even though they were no closer to opening negotiations, let alone winning concessions from the state. In this way, the increasingly radical nature of the Nore demands was itself a product of frustration at the lack of negotiation. Consequently, Easton argues, it would be wrong to portray Spithead as inherently 'good' and the Nore as inherently 'bad' from the start, because each was the product of a process of negotiation with the state that, due to contrasting government policy, developed in opposite directions as they went along.

== Mutinies and discontent following ==
In September 1797, the crew of HMS Hermione mutinied in the West Indies, killing almost all the officers in revenge for a number of grievances, including throwing into the sea, without proper burial, the bodies of three men killed by falling from the rigging in a desperate attempt not to be the last men on deck, which was punishable by flogging. The Hermione was taken by the crew to the Spanish port of La Guaira.

On 27 December, the crew of HMS Marie Antoinette murdered their officers and took their ship into a French port in the West Indies. Other mutinies took place off the coast of Ireland and at the Cape of Good Hope and spread to the fleet under Admiral Jervis off the coast of Spain. As noted above, in July 1798 a court martial on board HMS Defiance took the evidence of the oaths of allegiance to the United Irishmen as a prelude to mutiny, and eleven men were sentenced to hang for it.

In the years following Spithead and the Nore, there was about a 50% increase in mutinies among European navies and merchant companies. Scholars have linked it to the radical political ideologies developing at the time, including the development of working class consciousness among sailors. Both explanations have been the subject of extensive academic investigation. Political analyses often emphasize the radical discourse and conduct of the Nore mutineers as evidence of their ideological motivation. Class analyses often emphasize harsh discipline and economic grievances of the Spithead mutineers as pointing to "class solidarity". Recent attempts have been made to class these approaches under a heading of masculine identity, arguing that interpretations of what it meant to be a man for sailors marked the difference of motivation between the two mutinies.

== In the arts ==
- Mutiny on the Nore or British Sailors in 1797, a play (nautical drama) in three acts by Douglas Jerrold first performed at the Pavilion Theatre on 7 June 1830 with Thomas Cobham as Parker, and Royal Coburg Theatre 23 August 1830, and Tottenham Street Theatre 1830.
- The father of the protagonist in Frederick Marryat's The King's Own (1830) was hanged for his part in the Nore mutiny.
- Herman Melville's posthumously published novella Billy Budd (c. 1886-1891, published 1924), and the 1951 opera based on it by Benjamin Britten, are set immediately after the mutinies.
- The Floating Republic – An account of the Mutinies at Spithead and The Nore in 1797, by G. E. Manwaring and Bonamy Dobrée published by Frank Cass & Co. 1935 is a history of these mutinies. In 1982, BBC Radio 4's Saturday Night Theatre broadcast a dramatised account of the book called The Floating Republic.
- The 1962 film H.M.S. Defiant (released in the U.S. as Damn the Defiant!) and the 1958 novel Mutiny by Frank Tilsley are fictional accounts of a ship's crew undertaking a mutiny based on the Spithead mutiny, which is part of the plot.
- Ramage and the Freebooters (1969) by British novelist Dudley Pope begins when Lieutenant Ramage is given command of a ship anchored at Spithead during the mutiny, and must convince the crew to sail so that he may carry out his orders.
- The Men They Couldn't Hang, an English folk-punk group, commemorated the executed leaders of the mutiny in the ballad "The Colours" (1988).
- In William Kinsolving's 1996 novel Mister Christian, the Bounty mutineer Fletcher Christian returns from the South Seas and witnesses the Nore mutiny.
- Much of Dewey Lambdin's 2000 novel A King's Captain is set during the Nore Mutiny as seen by the protagonist, Alan Lewrie.
- Mutiny (2004) by Julian Stockwin is a fictional account of the Nore mutiny.
