= Elford =

Village in Staffordshire, England

Coordinates: 52.69°N 1.72°W

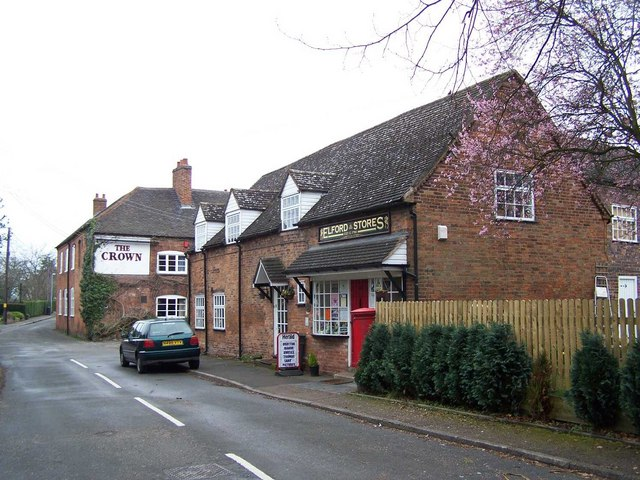
- Elford Stores

- Location within Staffordshire
- Population: 632 (2011)
- OS grid reference: SK189105
- Civil parish: Elford
- District: Lichfield
- Shire county: Staffordshire
- Region: West Midlands
- Country: England
- Sovereign state: United Kingdom
- Post town: TAMWORTH
- Postcode district: B79
- Dialling code: 01827
- Police: Staffordshire
- Fire: Staffordshire
- Ambulance: West Midlands
- UK Parliament: Tamworth

Elford is a village and civil parish in Lichfield District, Staffordshire, England. It is on the east bank of the River Tame, about 5 miles (8 km) east of the City of Lichfield and 5 miles north of Tamworth.

== Origins ==
The village is said to have derived its name from the great number of eels with which the river there formerly abounded. Before the Norman conquest this manor belonged to Ælfgār, Earl of Mercia. In the reign of Henry III, it was held by William de Arderne, whose descendants continued to enjoy it till the marriage of Maud, sole heiress of Sir John Arderne, with Thomas, second son of Sir John Stanley, of Latham, carried it into that family; thence to the families of Staunton, Smythe and Huddlestone. With the marriage of Sir John Bowes (1530-1608) to Anne Huddleston the manor passed to the Bowes family. In 1683 Craven Howard married Mary Bowes, and the manor remained with the Bowes Howard family until 1877, with the death of Mary Howard, Elford Hall was bequeathed to her Paget cousins.

== Buildings ==
Elford Hall was a mansion erected before 1757 by Henry Bowes Howard (Earl of Suffolk and Berkshire) and his son Lord Andover. In 1935, following the death of Howard Francis Paget (1858-1935), the Hall and much of the surrounding land was bequeathed, unexpectedly and much to the chagrin of his family, by the owner Francis Edward Howard Paget (1886-1945) to 'the People of Birmingham'. It was intended to be used as leisure facilities or for day trips for the people of Birmingham. By the 1960s, it shared the fate of so many country houses and was torn down. Few reminders of it remain today but those which do, including a walled garden, are currently the location of a successful restoration project by a local group.

Elford House, a surviving Victorian property, was built by the Webb family in the late 19th century. The initials of some family members can still be seen engraved into the wall near the rear patio.

St Peter's Church, the parish church, is a Grade II* listed building. A church has stood on the current site since Norman times but the current building predominantly dates from the mid-19th century.

Robert Bage (1730–1801) owned a paper mill, and lived in the Mill House, built 1760. He wrote six novels including Man as he is (1792) and Hermsprong or Man as he is not (1796), which were much admired by Sir Walter Scott. Elford experienced its largest and most damaging floods in living memory on Fathers' Day 2007. The police, fire service, the district council, environmental agencies and even the army were all present to lend a hand. Nevertheless, many houses were severely damaged, including the paper mill (recently converted to a dwelling) referred to above. The Mill house did not suffer as it is considerably elevated in relation to the Mill.

== Surrounding countryside ==
Elford Lowe, on the summit of a hill about one mile east of the village, is distinguished by a large oak tree and opposite it, at the distance of a mile, is a smaller lowe. These lowes have been known as 'Robin Hood's Shooting Butts', from a belief that he sometimes practised here, and was able to shoot an arrow between them.

== Notable people ==
- Richard Huddleston (MP) (ca.1535–1589), lived locally. politician, MP for Lichfield in 1588/89.
- Robert Bage (1730–1801), grew up locally, novelist & ran a paper-manufacturing business
- Charles Bage (1751–1822), architect, born in a Quaker family, grew up locally, novelist & wine merchant
- Fulk Greville Howard (1773–1846), politician, adopted the name Howard in 1807 upon marrying the heiress of Elford Hall
- Francis Edward Paget (1806–1882), an English clergyman and author.

== See also ==
- Listed buildings in Elford
