= Ramage's Signal =

1980 novel by Dudley Pope

- First edition
- Author: Dudley Pope
- Language: English
- Series: Lord Ramage novels
- Genre: Naval historical novels
- Publisher: Secker & Warburg (first ed.)
- Publication date: 1980
- Publication place: United Kingdom
- Media type: Print (hardback & paperback)
- Preceded by: The Ramage Touch
- Followed by: Ramage and the Renegades

Ramage's Signal, is an historical novel by Dudley Pope, set during the French Revolutionary Wars. It is the eleventh of the Ramage novels, following on from The Ramage Touch.

== Prelude ==
In the previous novel in the series, The Ramage Touch, Ramage was given orders for and independent fighting cruise of the Mediterranean: "to capture sink or destroy as many enemy ships as he could." The Calypso was perhaps the only British presence in the Mediterranean at the time. Off the Tuscan coast, Ramage was able to sink two French frigates and capture a third - all sister ships of his own command, a captured French frigate commissioned as HMS Calypso. The Second Lieutenant, Wagstaffe, was given command of the prize frigate, to sail it to Gibraltar, while the Calypso quits the Italian coast for the Gulf of Lion to continue the cruise.

No specific dates are given in the novel and the premise that the British had quit the Mediterranean is historical licence. It occurs after the failed French campaign in Egypt and Syria (ending 2 September 1801) but before the Treaty of Amiens (27 March 1802). Britain captured Menorca in 1798 but returned it to Spain in 1802 following the Treaty of Amiens. Malta was captured by the British (4 September 1800) and ultimately became a British Dominion. Malta was to be evacuated by the British under the terms of the Amiens treaty; however, Britain ultimately retained Malta.

== Plot ==
The novel commences with the Calypso sailing inshore off the Camargue region and the sighting of an isolated semaphore station. The outward appearance of Calypso, a former French frigate, causes no alarm. Ramage captures the station bloodlessly. It passes signals between the main French naval base at Toulon and the Spanish base at Cartagena. Ramage mans it with a detachment of his crew, to gather intelligence.

Signals report a merchant convoy of ships assembled at Barcelona, bound for Marseille, Genoa and Leghorn. Ramage intercepts the most recent message from Barcelona, complaining that the escort frigates have not arrived. Ramage sends a false signal, ordering the Barcelona convoy to sail and rendezvous with the escort off the "Baie de Foix", the vicinity of the captured signal station. The convoy of fifteen ships falls for the ruse and arrives. The problem facing Ramage is, what to do next. He lacks the crew to man the merchant ships as prizes, guard the prisoners taken and safely escort them to the British base at Gibraltar. Ramage devises a plan that is revealed as the story progresses.

Ramage issues revised orders to the merchant ship's master's. The orders are delivered by Midshipman Orsini, who speaks fluent French. The convoy sails to assemble at a safe but remote anchorage off the south of Sardinia. This does not arouse suspicion in the merchantmen but takes them away from the mainland and possible intervention by the French. In the course of the leg to Sardinia, Ramage has the smallest and most lively of the merchantmen, the tartane Passe Partout, boarded and taken over. Ramage contrives for the convoy to arrive piecemeal at their destination anchorage so that he is able to board and capture each merchantman as they arrive without raising alarm in the remainder. He disposes of the prisoner problem by landing them on the remote Sardinian shore.

Ramage mans six of the largest ships with prize-crews and dispatches them in convoy to Gibraltar under overall command of Aitken, the First Lieutenant. He still has to deal with the crews on the remaining mercantmen but this, he leaves for the night. He intends to keep Passe Partout, but scuttle the rest. Just as darkness falls, a French ship of the line (later identified as the 74 gun Scipion) is sighted approaching a night anchorage a little further around the coast. The French ship could jeopardies the Calypso and Ramage's plans.

Ramage could "cut and run" to escape the French ship but instead, decides to attack, using two of the gunpowder-ladened merchantmen as floating bombs. While the plan nearly goes awry, it is ultimately successful. As a final touch and to help ensure the safety of Aitken's convoy of prizes, Ramage returns to the French coast to destroy a signal station near Collioure. This severs communication between Toulon and Barcelona.

Aitken's convoy; however, is intercepted by a French frigate. Orsini, commanding one of the prizes, acts quickly. Sailing toward the frigate he hails in French that all the ships have the plague. Just as the first frigate departs, another is sighted approaching on the same course. She is identified as the Calypso.

== Characters ==
- Nicholas Ramage - post-captain commanding the frigate, HMS Calypso.
- Gianna the Marchesa di Volterri - an Italian noblewoman who fled from the French conquest of the Italian kingdoms in Ramage and lover of Lieutenant Ramage. She does not appear but is frequently mentioned.
- Paolo Orsini – nephew and heir to the marchesa's title. Midshipman on the Calypso.
- James Aitken – Calypso's first lieutenant.
- Wagstaffe – Calypso's second lieutenant. Mentioned but absent commanding the prize frigate captured at the end of The Ramage Touch
- Kenton – Calypso's third lieutenant.
- William "Blower" Martin – Calypso's Fourth lieutenant. Nicknamed because he plays the flute.
- Lieutenant Rennick – officer commanding the Calypso's marine detachment.
- Henry Southwick – master of the Calypso
- Bowen – medical officer of the Calypso
- Thomas Jackson - Ramage's American coxswain.
- Will Stafford - a London-born crewman who was a locksmith and occasional housebreaker before being pressed into the Navy.
- Alberto Rossi - a Genoese crewman and close comrade of Jackson and Stafford.
- James Maxton - one of Ramage's crewmen. He is an escaped slave from Grenada.
