= Richard Huddleston (MP) =

English politician

Richard Huddleston (ca. 1535 – 1 March 1589), of Thame Park, Oxfordshire and Elford, Staffordshire, was an English politician.

He was the eldest son of Richard Huddleston of Elford.

He was a Justice of the Peace for Oxfordshire from 1577 until c. 1587 and appointed High Sheriff of Oxfordshire for 1580–81. In the early 1580s he fought in the Netherlands and was made treasurer at war in the Netherlands in 1585–1587.

He was elected a member (MP) of the parliament of England for Lichfield in 1589.

He married Isabel, the daughter and coheiress of John Williams, 1st Baron Williams of Thame, and the widow of Sir Richard Wenman of Thame Park.
