= Ramage (novel) =

1965 novel by Dudley Pope

- First edition (UK)
- Author: Dudley Pope
- Cover artist: Paul Wright
- Language: English
- Series: Lord Ramage novels
- Genre: Naval historical novels
- Publisher: Weidenfeld & Nicolson (UK); Lippincott (US)
- Publication date: 1965
- Publication place: United Kingdom
- Media type: Print (Hardback & Paperback)
- Followed by: Ramage and the Drumbeat

Ramage (1965) is the first novel in the Lord Ramage novels by Dudley Pope. It is set during the French Revolutionary Wars and later in the series during the Napoleonic Wars.

== Plot ==
Nicholas Lord Ramage is the third lieutenant on His Majesty's ship Sibella, but assumes command when the Captain, and the First and Second Lieutenants are killed by fire from a French ship. The French ship had fatally crippled the Sibella and had killed over half of her crew, including the surgeon and surgeon's mate. As the new Captain, Ramage decides to abandon the sinking ship. He leaves the injured on the deck to be taken prisoner by the French and hopefully treated by their surgeon. Before he abandons the ship, Ramage retrieves some documents and the late Captain's last orders. The remaining crew then loads into the four lifeboats and rows away. As they are rowing away, the crew of the French ship set the Sibella on fire after taking the injured off.

Ramage opens Sir John Jervis's orders to the late Captain and finds that the Sibella was on a rescue mission to extricate the Marchesa di Volterri along with five other nobles including the Marchesa's two cousins. Austria was proving unable to defend its possessions in northern Italy, despite the subsidies the British government was paying to support the Austrian army. Britain, unable to deploy major forces on the European continent, used its commercial power to bolster the land armies of allies like Austria and Spain against the French for over a decade. Ramage decides to go through with the rescue. He takes the captain's gig with several topmen and the former Captain's coxswain, Jackson, with him and sends the other surviving sailors to Bastia. Ramage and his men then land upon Monte Argentario and find the Marchesa with the help of a local charcoal maker.

Half of the nobles decide not to risk trying to escape in a small boat, but Ramage rescues the Marchesa and one of her cousins, Count Pisano, although the other cousin, Count Pitti, is apparently killed by Napoleon's cavalry during the escape. The refugees are eventually picked up by the Lively frigate under the command of Captain Probus. That night Pisano accuses Ramage of cowardice in connection with the death of Count Pitti, submitting a formal accusation to Probus. During their time together, the Marchesa and Ramage develop a Romeo-and-Juliet-esque relationship, with the conniving of her family and the demands of discretion upon them.

After the Marchesa is safe, Ramage is sent to trial according to the Articles of War for his loss of the Sibella. Captain Croucher, a political enemy of Ramage's father, brings the accusation of cowardice into the trial. Ramage's trial is interrupted by Commodore Nelson's arrival, effectively ending the trial. Nelson gives him the command of the cutter Kathleen sending him to rescue the crew of the frigate HMS Belette which had run aground and was under fire from Napoleon's troops. Ramage saves the stranded crew and returns to Nelson. Upon his return, he learns that Count Pitti, who he had been unable to rescue had not been killed, but instead had hidden and later escaped. The book ends as Ramage considers his orders to carry the Marchesa and Count Pitti to Gibraltar.

== Characters ==
- Lieutenant Ramage- the third lieutenant who gains command of the Sibella after the seniors officers are killed.
- Gianna the Marchessa di Volterri - an Italian noblewoman fleeing from the French conquest of the Italian kingdoms. She is described as having black hair and comparable beauty to "Ghiberti's naked Eve."
- Count Luigi Pisano - one of the Italian refugees rescued by Ramage who accuses Ramage of cowardice. He is repeatedly characterized as a vain and man of doubtful and easily injured honour
- Count Antonio Pitti - the last of the three Italian refugees who agree to flee with Ramage
- Thomas Jackson - the American coxswain of the Sibella who is described as being weathered by his nautical service.
- Nino - an Italian charcoal maker bound to the Marchessa who shelters her from the French
- Captain Aloysius Probus - a peer and captain of HMS Lively (1794) who sympathizes with Ramage over the persecution during his court martial
- Captain Croucher - a political enemy of Ramage's father and commander of the Trumpeter
- Lieutenant Jack Dawlish - a close friend of Ramage, who is a lieutenant aboard the Lively
- Commodore Horatio Nelson - the commander in charge of fleet based in Bastia

== Ships ==
British:

- HMS Sibella
- HMS Lively (1794)
- HMS Trumpeter, 74-Gun Sail of the line
- His Majesty's Cutter Kathleen
- HMS Belette

French:

- Barras

== Critical reaction ==
The New York Times praised Ramage as "A grand tale written with panache, glitter and awesome authority".

'A splendid battlescape, a running adventure ashore...a good story' Evening Standard

In response to the novel, Orville Prescott wrote that "Dudley Pope has kept his story scudding along before a fine wind," and "Therewith predict that Lieut. Nicholas Ramage, commander of His Majesty's cutter Kathleen, will enjoy a highly successful career and survive some of the most perilous adventures experienced by any British naval officer in the entire history of the Napoleonic Wars."

== Publication history ==
Publishing information from Google Books:

- 1965, Lippencott, 302 pages
- 1970, Lippencott Williams and Wilkens (ISBN 9780397003945)
- 1974, Weidenfeld & Nicolson (ISBN 9780297767077) 301 pages
- 1975, Quartet Books (ISBN 9780704312418) 288 pages
- 2000, Ithaca, New York, McBook Press (ISBN 978-0-935526-76-9) Paperback, 319 pages
- 2003, Redwood Editions (ISBN 9781741211276) 379 pages
