= Governor Ramage R.N. =

1973 novel by Dudley Pope

- First edition
- Author: Dudley Pope
- Language: English
- Series: Lord Ramage novels
- Genre: Naval historical novel
- Publisher: Secker & Warburg
- Publication date: 1973
- Publication place: United Kingdom
- Media type: Print (hardback & paperback)
- Preceded by: Ramage and the Freebooters
- Followed by: Ramage's Prize

Governor Ramage R.N. is an historical novel by Dudley Pope, set during the French Revolutionary Wars. It is the fourth of the Ramage novels, following on from Ramage and the Freebooters.

== Plot ==
Ramage's ship, HMS Triton, is performing guard duty to a merchant convoy travelling from Britain to Jamaica. An otherwise routine assignment is complicated by his being under the orders of Rear Admiral Goddard, his family's sworn enemy. The convoy is menaced by French and Spanish attackers, and hit by a hurricane. Ramage pulls through, only to be court-martialed under Goddard's trumped-up charges.

A side-plot occurs when Triton is wrecked on a remote island, Isla Culebra. Ramage discovers that the Spanish garrison is searching for lost pirate treasure, having failed to puzzle out a clue left by the pirate in the form of a short poem. Successfully taking the Spanish forces prisoner, Ramage turns his wits to solving the puzzle and eventually triumphs through a combination of clear thinking and good fortune, recovering a large quantity of gold and precious stones which he delivers to the British authorities on leaving the island. It is his short spell as the senior ranking officer of either side on the island that gives the book its title, though in fact Ramage never attempts to exercise any civil authority over the island.

== Characters ==
- Nicholas Ramage - lieutenant and commander of the brig HMS Triton
- Thomas Jackson - Ramage's American coxswain
- Henry Southwick – Ramage's sailing master on Triton
- Bowen – Ramage's medical officer
- Maxton – one of Ramage's crewmen, a native of Grenada (inconsistently named "Maxwell" elsewhere in the series)
- Rear Admiral Goddard – second in command at Jamaica
- Captain Croucher – captain of the flagship HMS Lion
- M. de St. Brieuc - a pseudonymous, but clearly important, French passenger
- M. de St. Cast - another such French passenger
- Sidney Yorke – merchant, master and owner of Topaz

== Ships ==
- HMS Triton
- HMS Lion
- Topaz
- Peacock
