= Listed buildings in Elford =

Elford is a civil parish in the district of Lichfield, Staffordshire, England. It contains 28 buildings that are recorded in the National Heritage List for England. Of these, one is listed at Grade II*, the middle of the three grades, and the others are at Grade II, the lowest grade. The parish contains the village of Elford and the surrounding countryside. Most of the listed buildings are houses and associated structures, cottages, farmhouses and farm buildings, the earlier of which are timber framed or have a timber-framed core. The other listed buildings are a church, a public house, a former smithy, a bridge, and three mileposts.

== Key ==
Grade	Criteria
II*	Particularly important buildings of more than special interest
II	Buildings of national importance and special interest

== Buildings ==
Name and location	Photograph	Date	Notes	Grade
Elford Post Office, The Square; 52.69168°N 1.72259°W		17th century	A house incorporating a shop that has a timber framed core with cruck construction. It was remodelled in the 18th century, with red brick replacing the external walls. There is one storey and an attic, and approximately three bays. To the right is a shop front with bow windows, near the centre is a doorway with a gabled hood, the windows are casements with segmental heads, and there are three gabled dormers. Inside is a pair of cruck trusses.	II
St Peter's Church; 52.69290°N 1.72745°W		1598	The oldest part of the church is the tower, most of the rest of the church was designed by Anthony Salvin in 1848–49, and there were alterations in 1869–70 by G. E. Street. The church is built in stone with roofs of lead and tile, and consists of a nave, a south aisle, a south porch, a chancel with north and south chapels, and a west tower. The tower has four stages, diagonal buttresses, an octagonal stair turret to the south, a three-light pointed west window, and an embattled parapet with crocketed corner pinnacles.	II*
Black and White Cottage, Church Road; 52.69191°N 1.72323°W		17th century	The cottage was extended in the 20th century. It is timber framed with brick infill, and has a tile roof. The original part has two storeys and an attic, a timber-framed porch and a casement window. The extension to the left has two storeys and two bays. In the ground floor is a bay window, over which is a canopy.	II
Crown Cottage, Church Road; 52.69188°N 1.72311°W	—	17th century	A timber framed cottage with brick infill and a tile roof. There is one storey and an attic, and three bays. To the left is a porch with a hipped roof, the windows are casements, and there are three gabled dormers.	II
Barn and stables, Elford Park Farm; 52.70724°N 1.72071°W	—	17th century	The farm buildings were remodelled and extended in the 18th century. The original part is timber framed with brick infill on a plinth, the rebuilding and extensions are in red brick, and the roof is tiled. There are two ranges forming an L-shaped plan. The older range contains stables, and has three bays; the later range is a barn with four bays, containing barn doors and a loft door.	II
The Arches, Church Road; 52.69126°N 1.72124°W	—	17th century	The cottage is timber framed with some rebuilding in brick, and has a tile roof. There is one storey and an attic, two bays, and a single-storey lean-to at each end. On the front are two doorways and casement windows, all with segmental heads, and there are two gabled dormers. At the rear and in the gable ends is exposed timber framing.	II
The Forge, Church Road; 52.69132°N 1.72276°W		Late 17th century	The house was restored in the 19th century, and is timber framed with red brick infill and a tile roof. There is one storey and an attic, three bays, and a single-storey lean-to on the left. In the centre is a gabled porch, the windows are casements with hood moulds, and there are three gabled dormers, the central one with a finial.	II
The Cottage, The Square; 52.69202°N 1.72235°W	—	Late 17th century	A timber framed cottage with rendered infill and a tile roof. There are two storeys and two bays, and the windows are casements.	II
Elford Park Farmhouse; 52.70742°N 1.72112°W	—	Early 18th century	The farmhouse was extended to the west in the 19th century. It is in red brick with a tile roof, and has dentilled eaves bands. The older part has storey bands, two parallel ranges, three storeys and two bays, and it contains casement windows. There is a single-storey lean-to on the right. The later part projects on the left, it has two storeys and three bays, the outer bays projecting and gabled. In the centre is a gabled porch, and the windows are sashes with wedge lintels.	II
The Old Rectory, The Gardens; 52.69172°N 1.72441°W	—	Early 18th century	The rectory, later a private house, was altered and extended in the 19th century. It is in red brick with a band, cogged eaves, and a tile roof, hipped at the centre, and with parapeted gables. There are two storeys and an H-shaped plan, with a central range of five bays flanked by gabled cross-wings. In the centre is a doorway with a pediment, and the windows are a mix of sashes and casements. On the right cross-wing is a polygonal conservatory with a canted bay window.	II
Elford Bridge East; 52.68669°N 1.71760°W		18th century	The bridge carries a road over the River Tame. It is in stone with brick arches, and consists of three semicircular arches. The bridge has hood moulds over the arches, triangular cutwaters rising as buttresses and forming refuges, a plain parapet with a moulded string course, and the bridge sweeps round to end in square buttresses.	II
Kitchen Garden Walls, Former Elford Hall; 52.69331°N 1.72906°W	—	18th century	The walls surround the kitchen garden of the hall that has been demolished. They are in red brick with stone coping, and are ramped up in places. The walls contain doorways, some with segmental heads and other with flat heads, and brick lean-to potting sheds.	II
Former Stables, Elford Park Farm; 52.70732°N 1.72049°W	—	18th century	The former stables are in red brick with dentilled eaves and a tile roof. There are two storeys and four bays. The building contains four stable doors with segmental heads and irregular fenestration.	II
Mere Pitts Farmhouse; 52.67048°N 1.70517°W	—	Mid 18th century	A red brick farmhouse with a double eaves band and a tile roof. There are two storeys and an attic, and an L-shaped plan, consisting of a main range with three bays and a rear wing. Two steps lead up to the central doorway that has a rectangular fanlight, the windows are casements with segmental heads, and there are gabled dormers.	II
Barn, Mere Pitts Farm; 52.67069°N 1.70551°W	—	Mid 18th century	The barn is in red brick with a tile roof, and has an L-shaped plan, with two ranges at right angles. The main range has one storey and three bays, and it contains full-height barn doors and square vents. The other range is gabled and has a loft door.	II
Mill House; 52.68479°N 1.71630°W	—	Mid 18th century	The house, which was later extended, is in red brick with dentilled eaves and a tile roof. It has two storeys, and the original house has a main range and two parallel rear wings. The doorway has a rectangular fanlight and a bracketed hood, the windows are casements with segmental heads, and there are later extensions.	II
Former smithy, Church Road; 52.69132°N 1.72238°W	—	18th century	The former smithy is in red brick with a tile roof, and has one story and a T-shaped plan. It contains irregular fenestration and a boarded door.	II
The Crown Inn, The Square; 52.69185°N 1.72240°W		18th century	The public house, which probably has an earlier core, is in red brick with a tile roof. There are two storeys, a main range of two bays, and a slightly projecting cross-wing to the left. The windows are casements with segmental heads.	II
Garden wall north of The Old Rectory; 52.69185°N 1.72472°W	—	18th century	The wall is in red brick with coping in stone and brick, partly on a plinth. There are piers with stone caps at intervals and two gateways.	II
Avenue House, Church Road; 52.69306°N 1.72505°W	—	Late 18th century	A red brick house with a tile roof, and three storeys. There is a T-shaped plan with a main block of three bays, a rear service wing, and further extensions to the rear. In the centre is a doorway with a rectangular fanlight, and the windows are casements with segmental heads.	II
Elford Low Farmhouse; 52.67986°N 1.71235°W	—	Late 18th century	A red brick farmhouse with a dentilled eaves band, and a hipped tile roof. There are three storeys, a main range with five bays, and two rear wings. The windows are casements with segmental heads, those in the middle bay are blind, and in the right return is a Classical portico.	II
Park Farmhouse; 52.70194°N 1.72651°W	—	Late 18th century	The farmhouse is in red brick with a floor band, a stone moulded eaves cornice, and a hipped tile roof. There is a main block with three storeys and three bays, and recessed flanking wings each with two storeys and one bay. In the centre, steps lead up to a porch and a doorway with a rectangular fanlight and a moulded cornice. This is flanked by canted bay windows, each with a moulded cornice. The other windows in the main block are sashes, and in the wings they are casements. In the angle between the front and the right wing is a conservatory.	II
Upfields Farmhouse; 52.67513°N 1.70993°W	—	Late 18th century	A red brick farmhouse on a plinth with a moulded eaves cornice, and a slate roof. There are three storeys and a T-shaped plan, with a main range of three bays, and a rear wing. In the centre is a porch with paired Tuscan columns, and a full entablature with a fluted frieze containing rosettes, and a dentilled cornice. The porch is flanked by small windows, and the other windows are sashes with segmental heads.	II
Home Farmhouse; 52.69431°N 1.72557°W	—	Early 19th century	A red brick farmhouse with a dentilled eaves band and a tile roof. There are three storeys, three bays, and rear extensions. The central doorway has pilasters and a bracketed hood, it is flanked by small windows, and the other windows are sashes.	II
The Coach House; 52.69290°N 1.72825°W	—	Early 19th century	Stables and a coach house that have been converted for residential use, they are in red brick and have a hipped slate roof. There is a single storey, a central range of eleven bays, and flanking single-bay wings, each with a full-height semicircular blind arch. The windows are casements, and there are two Tuscan porches.	II
Milepost at NGR SK 19420970; 52.68463°N 1.71421°W		Mid to late 19th century	The milepost is on the north side of Haselour Lane, and is in cast iron with a triangular plan and a sloping top. On the top is "ELFORD" and on the sides are the distances to Harlaston, Clifton, Measham, Ashby, Tamworth, Alrewas, Lichfield and Burton upon Trent.	II
Milepost at NGR SK 19570813; 52.67044°N 1.71207°W		Mid to late 19th century	The milepost is on the east side of the A513 road. It is in cast iron and has a triangular plan and a sloping top. On the top is "ELFORD PARISH" and on the sides are the distances to Tamworth, Alrewas, and Burton upon Trent.	II
Milepost at NGR SK 19661093; 52.69567°N 1.71058°W		Mid to late 19th century	The milepost is on the southeast side of the A513 road. It is in cast iron and has a triangular plan and a sloping top. On the top is "ELFORD PARISH" and on the sides are the distances to Tamworth, Alrewas, and Burton upon Trent.	II
