= Ramage and the Freebooters =

1969 novel by Dudley Pope

- First edition
- Author: Dudley Pope
- Language: English
- Series: Lord Ramage novels
- Genre: Naval historical novels
- Publisher: Weidenfeld & Nicolson
- Publication date: 1969
- Publication place: United Kingdom
- Media type: Print (Hardback & Paperback)
- Preceded by: Ramage and the Drumbeat
- Followed by: Governor Ramage R.N.

Ramage and the Freebooters, is an historical novel by Dudley Pope, set during the French Revolutionary Wars. It is the third of the Ramage novels, following on from Ramage and the Drumbeat.

== Plot ==
Ramage, recovering from medical leave after the Battle of Cape St Vincent is summoned to the Admiralty by Lord Spencer and given command of a brig, HMS Triton, with orders to take sealed dispatches to the admirals commanding the British fleets off Brest, Cádiz and the West Indies. However, there is just one small problem – HMS Triton is docked at Spithead, where crews of the Royal Navy have mutinied over pay and living conditions. Ramage knows that if he fails in his mission, he will become a convenient political scapegoat for the government.

Although Ramage sympathizes with the aims of the mutineers, he has a mission to perform. He obtains orders to have half of the crew of Triton replaced by men who formerly served under him on the Kathleen, including Southwick and Jackson. He then overcomes the mutiny by cutting the anchor cable as the tide was going out of Spithead harbor, forcing the men to man their posts, or risk drowning when the ship capsized.

Having dealt with the mutiny, partly with the secret aid of Jackson, Stafford, Rossi and Maxton, Ramage tries to cure Bowen the surgeon of alcoholism. Through a combination of enforced sobriety and an appeal to the man's pride as an expert chess-player (almost the only remaining accomplishment the frequently intoxicated Bowen can take pride in), Ramage succeeds in rehabilitating Bowen, who proves to be an excellent doctor once he has quit drinking.

Ramage successfully completes his rendezvous with Admiral Curtis off Brest, and Admiral Jervis of Cádiz, Ramage sets sail across the Atlantic. On the way, he captures La Merlette, a French-owned slave ship before making his rendezvous with Admiral Robinson on HMS Prince of Wales at Barbados.

Ramage is ordered by Admiral Robinson to Grenada, from which numerous merchant ships sailing to nearby Martinique have been mysteriously disappearing en route, presumably due to activity by privateers. Again, Ramage is being set up as a scapegoat, since Admiral Robinson and two of his frigate captains have spent months unsuccessfully searching for these privateers, and can now shift the blame to Ramage should fail at the same mission. At Grenada, Ramage gets off to an uneven start with Colonel Wilson. He then explores the coastlines of all islands between Grenada and Martinique, but is unsuccessful in finding the pirate's lair. On his return to Grenada, Ramage meets Governor Fisher, who turns out to be a pompous, incompetent social climber. However, Ramage accepts Fisher's invitation to a fete, as it will give him an opportunity to meet with many of the local shipowners. At the ball, Ramage falls quickly in love with Claire de Giraud, the extremely competent and beautiful private secretary to the Governor. However, at the ball, one of the shipowners insists that he must sail at once, as his cargo is perishable. Ramage reluctantly agrees, knowing that the ship will most likely be seized before reaching its destination. Only four people know the schedule. When Ramage steps out on the balcony of the governor's mansion for some fresh air, he notices some native drumming, sounding further and further way like the transmission of a message, and the sudden appearance of bonfires on the far coast. He realizes that this is how information on the sailing of ships from Grenada is reaching the pirates, but later realizes that the only person who could have overheard the schedule was Claire de Giraud. When he confronts Claire, he finds that she is the unwilling pawn of Governor Fisher's butler, who is not only a French spy, but is her father. Ramage has his native-Grenadan crewman, Maxton, train Jackson in how to send a false message and lays a trap for the privateers – he and twenty crewmen from the Triton hide in the hold of a ship provided by Rondin, and allow themselves to be captured by the privateers, with Southwick following just under the horizon in Triton. The plan works, but Ramage finds himself highly outnumbered as he and his crew recapture the ship from the privateers and attempt to fight their way out of their hidden base. With the help of Triton, Ramage finally manages to overcome the privateers and to capture two of their ships. Arriving back at Grenada, he finds a lieutenant waiting with letter from Admiral Robinson reprimanding him for failing to complete his mission, and an angry report from Governor Fisher to the Admiral, both confirming his suspicions that he had been set up as a scapegoat from the start. However, with the capture of the privateers, Ramage finds that he now has the upper hand over his political enemies.

== Characters ==
- Nicholas Ramage - lieutenant and former commander of the cutter HMS Kathleen
- Thomas Jackson - Ramage's American coxswain
- Henry Southwick – Ramage's former master of the Kathleen
- Bowen – Ramage's alcoholic medical officer
- Maxton – one of Ramage's crewmen, a native of Grenada (inconsistently named "Maxwell" elsewhere in the series)
- Colonel Humphrey Wilson – British Army commander on Grenada
- Sir Jason Fisher – governor of Grenada
- Miss Claire de Giraud – private secretary to the Governor
- John Rondin – local businessman and ship owner
- George Spencer, 2nd Earl Spencer – First Lord of the Admiralty

== Ships ==
- HMS Triton
- HMS Rover
- HMS Prince of Wales
- Le Merlette
- Jorum

== Critical reception ==
Booklist called it "Another stirring eighteenth-century sea adventure", while The New York Times declared "Not even C.S. Forester knows more about the routine and battle procedures of the British Navy in the days of Nelson."
