= Ramage and the Drumbeat =

1967 novel by Dudley Pope

Ramage and the Drum Beat
- First edition
- Author: Dudley Pope
- Language: English
- Series: Lord Ramage novels
- Genre: Naval historical novels
- Publisher: Weidenfeld & Nicolson
- Publication date: 1967
- Publication place: United Kingdom
- Media type: Print (Hardback & Paperback)
- Preceded by: Ramage
- Followed by: Ramage and the Freebooters

Ramage and the Drum Beat, later republished as Ramage and the drumbeat and as Drumbeat is an historical novel by Dudley Pope, set during 1796 and 1797 amongst the naval warfare of the French Revolutionary Wars. It is the second of the Ramage novels, following on from Ramage. During the book, Ramage becomes an integral part of ensuring British readiness for the Battle of Cape St. Vincent (1797).

== Plot ==
The book follows Lieutenant Nicholas Lord Ramage and his experiences commanding the cutter HMS Kathleen. Dispatched by Commodore Horatio Nelson to carry messages to Gibraltar while transporting the Italians refugees rescued in Ramage. During the voyage, the Marchesa and Ramage exchange rings through a faked shooting competition. Soon the Kathleen encounters the crippled Spanish frigate, La Sabina. Deciding that it would be imprudent to leave the hulk drifting at sea, he forces the ship to surrender to his far inferior armed ship by demonstrating that he has the means to blow the stern off the immobile ship. He takes La Sabina in tow.

Soon after, two British frigates encounter Kathleen and remove the prisoners from the hulk in tow. The captain of one of the ships also takes charge of the Marchesa, to the great reluctance of Ramage and herself. Soon after, Ramage and the hulk drift into a Spanish fleet returning to the port of Cartagena, Spain. Though Kathleen is captured, Ramage, with the help of Jackson, passes himself off as an American sailor pressed by the British, and receives liberty from the Spanish. While in Cartagena (with other foreign and non-foreign refugees from Kathleen who had fake Protections) Ramage spies on the Spanish admiral José de Córdoba, stealing several official documents from his house. From these Ramage learns that the Spanish fleet will soon sail for the Atlantic. Realizing the danger of the situation, he steals a xebec and returns to Gibraltar, where he finds the recaptured Kathleen. The Commissioner of the port then sends Ramage to find Sir John Jervis and warn him of the battle. After a squall, he encounters the fleet, which quickly proceeds to Cape St. Vincent where they fight the Spanish fleet on 14 February 1797, Kathleen acting as a support ship for Lord Nelson. Entangled in the battle, Ramage and Kathleen become integral in the fouling of San Nicholas aboard San Jose, allowing Nelson in HMS Captain to come into battle. The British fleet is victorious, capturing four ships, and Ramage nearly dies from a wound which knocks him into the sea. However, he is rescued by several of his sailors, but gains no credit for his role in the battle.

== Characters ==
=== Fictional ===
- Nicholas Ramage - lieutenant and commander of the cutter HMS Kathleen
- Gianna the Marchesa di Volterri - an Italian noblewoman who fled from the French conquest of the Italian kingdoms in Ramage and lover of Lieutenant Ramage.
- Count Antonio Pitti - a cousin of the Marchessa di Volterri
- Thomas Jackson - Ramage's American coxswain; possesses a genuine American Protection certificate exempting him from British Navy service, but chooses to remain with Ramage out of loyalty and helps other crewmen pass as Americans, including:
  - Will Stafford - a London-born crewman who was a locksmith and occasional housebreaker before being pressed into the Navy; enables Ramage to burgle Admiral de Córdoba's house.
  - Alberto Rossi - a Genoese crewman who is fiercely loyal to both Ramage and the Marchesa; like Jackson and Stafford, becomes a recurring character throughout the remainder of the series.
  - James Maxton - a West Indian crewman from Belmont, Grenada; stated to be exceptionally skilled with either a machete (owing to his upbringing cutting sugar-cane) or a Navy cutlass, also becomes a recurring character.
  - Sven Jensen - a Danish prize-fighter; killed in action when boarding the San Nicholas. Implied to be able to knock a man senseless with one punch, but this ability is never used in the story.

=== Real ===
- Sir John Jervis - commander of the British fleet out of Gibraltar
- Horatio Nelson - sympathizer with Ramage and commodore of a British squadron

== Ships ==
Below are the fictional ships, see the respective fleet lists from the Battle of Cape St. Vincent for real ships. British

- HMS Kathleen - cutter armed with 10 x 6 lb carronades

Spanish

- La Sabina - Spanish frigate demasted by a blow and captured by the Kathleen

== Critical reception ==
Booklist called it "Another rousing tale of the sea ...", while The New York Times declared "Not even C.S. Forester knows more about the routine and battle procedures of the British Navy in the days of Nelson." Kirkus Reviews reported that "Mr. Pope is as good at detail as Ramage is at tactics and it's for those who like their cutlasses sharp and their romance romantic."
