= St Peter's Church, Elford =

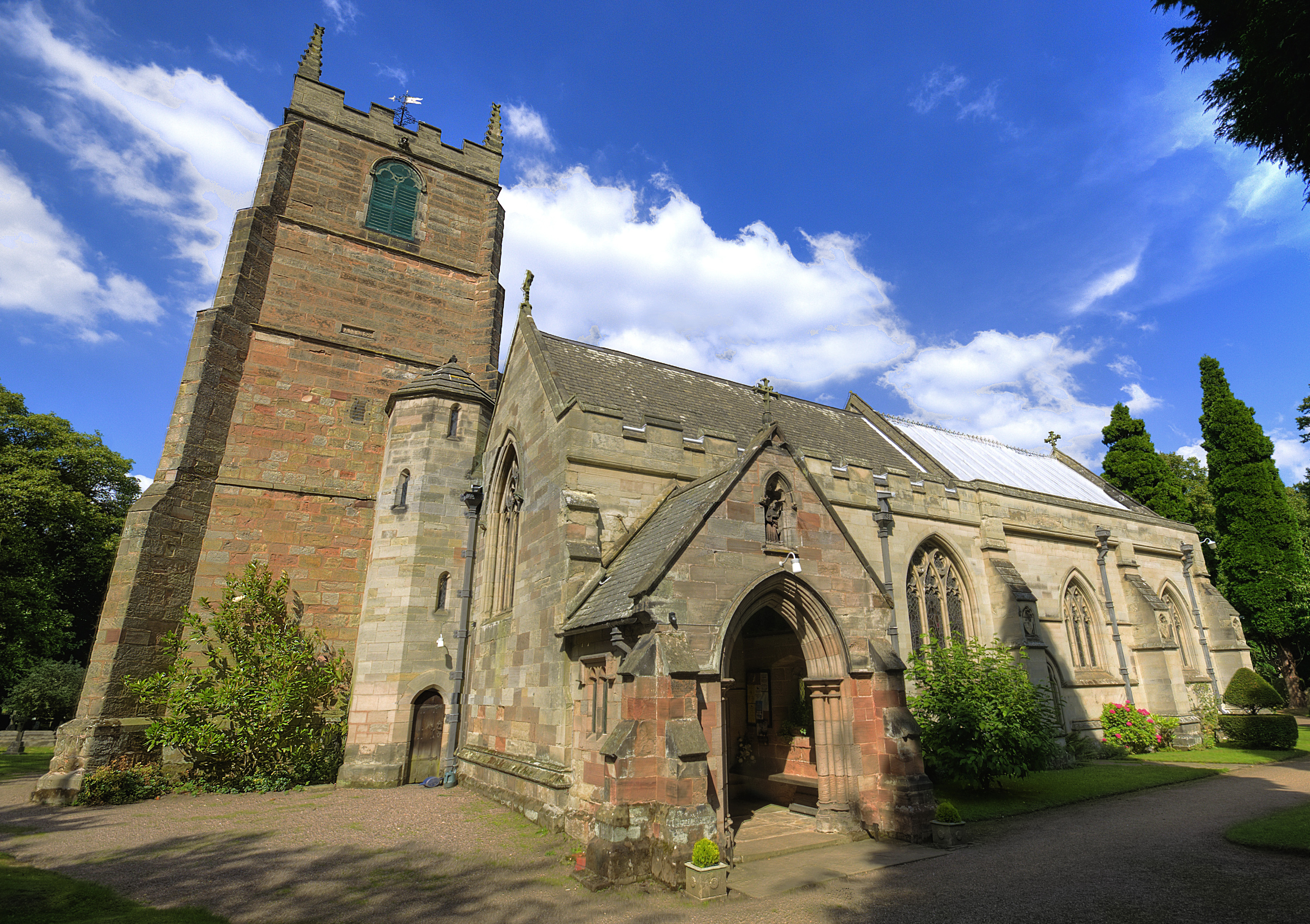
- St Peter's Church, Elford
- 52.692833°N 1.727412°W
- OS grid reference: SK 18523 10609
- Location: Elford, Staffordshire
- Country: England
- Denomination: Anglican
- Website: St Peter's Church

Architecture
- Functional status: Active
- Heritage designation: Grade II*
- Designated: 20 November 1986
- Architect(s): Anthony Salvin & George Edmund Street
- Architectural type: Church
- Style: Gothic
- Completed: 1870

Administration
- Province: Canterbury
- Diocese: Lichfield
- Parish: Lichfield

St Peter's Church, Elford is a parish church in the village of Elford, Staffordshire in England. The church is situated on the eastern edge of the village on the north bank of the River Tame. The church is a Grade II* listed building. A church has stood on the current site since Norman times but the current building predominantly dates from the mid-19th century.

== History ==
=== Original Buildings ===
The earliest known church to be built on the current site was Norman, probably dating from the 12th century. A Norman arch survived in a wall dividing the nave from the south aisle until the restoration of 1848. A small doorway from the original Norman church in the north wall of the nave was bricked up, probably in the 18th century, and a plain window is now set in its place. In the second half of the 14th century the old Norman church was falling into disrepair, and major restorations and alterations to the church took place under the guidance of Sir Thomas Arderne, Lord of Elford at that time.

A century later Sir John Stanley added the south aisle and chantry dedicated to the Blessed Virgin Mary. The ancient roses and portcullises surmounted by crowns in a window of the south aisle signify the connection between the Stanleys and Henry VII, who is said to have met secretly with Lord Stanley at Elford on the night before the Battle of Bosworth Field and persuaded Stanley to desert Richard III and join his side.

In 1598 the old Norman tower was replaced by the current tower which is embattlemented with four pinnacles. The date can be seen on the exterior of the tower today. The church avoided destruction during the Civil War due to the efforts of the then Rector, Thomas Dowley, who although a Puritan managed to preserve the church from desecration. Of the original Norman church nothing now remains. The oldest parts of the current building are the 14th-century chancel east wall and the 16th-century west tower.

=== Current Building ===
The present church was designed by Anthony Salvin in 1848/49 with the south aisle and south chapel rebuilt by George Edmund Street in 1869/70. Francis Paget (Rector 1835–1882), wished the restoration work when completed to be as near to Sir Thomas Arderne's church of the 14th century as possible. Victorian decoration includes roof and walls painted and gilded, stained glass by Wailes, Ward & Hughes, ornate brass altar rails to guard the elaborate sanctuary. A 200m tree lined avenue currently leads up to the church creating a striking impression.

== Features ==
=== Glass ===
The window at the west end of the south aisle near the entrance is of Flemish glass, said to originate from the Herkenrode Abbey near Liège, like the glass in the Lady Chapel of Lichfield Cathedral. By being brought to England they were saved from destruction at the hands of the armies of the French Revolution. The subject is the 'Presentation of the Virgin' in the Temple. The glass was installed at St Peter's in 1825.

=== Floor ===
The nave of St Peter's boasts some highly regarded Minton Tiles. During the construction work of 1848/49, medieval tiles were found beneath the brick floor. They appear to have been relief tiles with a geometric pattern composed mainly of intersecting circles. Minton's made a new nave pavement for the church replicating their design in line-impressed tiles using brown and buff grounds.

Former Rectors of Elford are commemorated in the brasses in the Chancel floor. The ones there now are 19th-century restorations, as the originals disappeared long ago. There are some genuinely old slabs belonging to members of the Arderne family in the floor of the Chantry Chapel near where the altar formerly stood, and the churchyard contains some tombstones with quaint inscriptions.

=== Monumental Effigies ===
The monumental effigies at St Peter's have been regarded by some as being among the finest in the country.

- Sir Thomas Arderne – the oldest effigy is that of Sir Thomas Arderne, the 14th-century church builder who died in 1391, and his wife, Matilda. The effigies of Thomas and Matilda are unusual in that they are holding hands. Notable are the angels and "weepers" in the panels round the sides of the tomb. Although the tombs are mostly plain now, some of the original colouring can still be seen on the shields on the sides.
- Sir John Stanley – the tomb of Sir John Stanley, founder of the Chantry, wearing armour of his period. The date of death was 1474 and is inscribed on the tomb. We only see the plain white effigy, whereas the original would have been highly decorated. Near his head is an eagle and a baby which refers to the legend associated with Sir John's descent from the Latham family. His ancestor, Sir Thomas Latham, whose wife was barren, wanted to adopt his illegitimate son so he placed him in a nearby eagle's nest. He called his wife and she was delighted with this 'miracle' and took the child as her own.
- Sir John Stanley's Grandson – the most famous effigy is that of Sir John's grandson, also John, who is shown holding the tennis ball that caused his death in 1460 and pointing to his temple. His effigy is in hard grit stone unlike the others, which are of alabaster. With the child's death the male line of the Elford Stanleys became extinct.
- Sir William Smythe – The final effigy in the Chantry is that of Sir William Smythe, Lord of Elford, died 1525, and his two wives, Anne Staunton and the Lady Isabella Neville. He inherited Elford through his first wife and his second was a niece of Warwick the Kingmaker and a cousin of Richard III.

=== Monuments ===
A notable post-Reformation monument is that of William Brooke of Haselour, dated 1641, above the Staunton effigy in the Chancel. He was the grandson of Lucy Huddleston of Elford.

High up in the Chantry Chapel can be seen the shields of the Lords of the Manor from Saxon times beginning with Wulfric, Earl of Mercia and founder of Burton Abbey.

== See also ==
- Grade II* listed buildings in Lichfield (district)
- Listed buildings in Elford
- Earl of Derby
- List of church restorations and alterations by Anthony Salvin
