= Alan Lewrie =

Fictional character by Dewey Lambdin

Alan Lewrie, KB, BT, is the fictional hero and main character of Dewey Lambdin's naval adventure series of novels set during the American and the French Revolutions and the Napoleonic Wars. The series spanned some twenty-five novels with a 26th reportedly in progress at the time of Lambdin's death in July 2021.

== Character ==
Alan Lewrie provides a departure from other heroes of the genre. C.S. Forester's Horatio Hornblower, Alexander Kent's Richard Bolitho, and Dudley Pope's Lord Ramage are much more in the traditional hero mode in attitudes and upbringing. Hornblower is the son of a country doctor packed off to sea after the death of his parents, Bolitho and Ramage are the sons of naval officers (captain and admiral, respectively) and scions of seafaring families. Lewrie, on the other hand, is little more than an educated, fun-loving Londoner who spends his time gambling, drinking, and pursuing women. His character shares elements of Patrick O'Brian's Jack Aubrey, Bernard Cornwell's Richard Sharpe, George MacDonald Fraser's Harry Flashman, and Henry Fielding's Tom Jones.

With the help of friends, mentors, enemies, villains, and the mention of a god or two, Alan quickly rises through the ranks of the Royal Navy. He becomes the captain of his own ship and sails off to many subsequent adventures.

As with all historical fiction, Lewrie's adventures are set against the events of his setting. He participates in several of the major naval and land battles of the American Revolutionary War and the Napoleonic era.

While a multi-volume series of novels following the career of a British naval officer in the late 18th Century and through the Napoleonic Wars is hardly new ground for novelists, Lambdin's series is much more bawdy than the C.S. Forester Hornblower series. Unlike other series, Alan Lewrie does not quite express himself in the manner of the times, though Lambdin throws in a lot of period slang, sometimes reaching before or after the times that Lewrie is active.

== Life ==
Alan Lewrie was born on Epiphany Sunday, 1763, at St Martin in the Fields (parish), London, the bastard son of Elisabeth Lewrie and Sir Hugo St. George Willoughby, a captain in 4th Regiment of Foot. Elisabeth Lewrie had been abandoned by Sir Hugo Willoughby and died in childbirth leaving Alan Lewrie to be placed in the parish poorhouse. As a toddler he was employed as an oakum-picker and flax-pounder for the Royal Dockyards.

In 1766, he was claimed by Sir Hugo from the poorhouse and taken into the Willoughby household at St. James's Square, London. He was provided the best educational opportunities available and proved himself to be an excellent student but one also prone to acts of indiscipline. He was expelled from Harrow School in 1779 after a prank involving gunpowder went awry resulting in the demolition of a coach house and the faculty stables. This marked the end of his formal education.

In 1780, he was involuntarily sent to sea as a midshipman on the third-rate HMS Ariadne. He was transferred to the 28-gun fifth-rate frigate HMS Desperate, in 1781 and participated in the Battle of the Chesapeake, the Siege of Yorktown, the evacuation of Loyalist families from Wilmington, North Carolina, and the Battle of St. Kitts. He is promoted to lieutenant in 1782 and his actions bring him to the attention of Admiral Sir Samuel Hood who becomes his patron. In 1783, his ship was paid off and he resumed civilian life in London.

From 1784 to 1786 he served in the East Indies as part of a clandestine operation to suppress pirates preying on the ships of the East India Company. Upon his return to England he is rewarded for his actions by being given command of his own ship, marries, and spends the next three years on the Bahamas Station enforcing the Navigation Acts and suppressing piracy. During this period he proves his mettle as commander of a warship, makes a powerful enemy, and becomes a father—legitimately for once—following his marriage to Caroline Chiswick, the daughter of a Loyalist family that moved back to England after the American Revolution.

When Lewrie's ship returns from the Bahamas and pays off he finds himself unemployed for the next four years. He is called up briefly for the Nootka Sound Controversy but is primarily engaged as a gentleman farmer in Surrey. As the French Revolutionary Wars begin to draw England in, he is called back to active service initially in the Impress Service, the organization responsible for impressment, and later as first lieutenant of a frigate during the siege of Toulon. His actions during the siege result in his being promoted to commander and given a ship. He serves under Nelson in the Mediterranean in 1794 and on detached service in the Adriatic 1796. After participating in the Battle of Cape St. Vincent in February 1797, he returns to England. Shortly afterward, he is made post-captain and put in command of HMS Proteus, which becomes one of the few ships to quit the Nore Mutiny.

In October 1797, HMS Proteus participates in the Battle of Camperdown, where Lewrie is wounded. After his ship is repaired and he recovers, he is sent back into the Caribbean to confront Haitian rebels, French privateers, Yellow Fever in his crew, and a band of Acadian pirates from Louisiana. In 1799, his ship is reassigned to escort East Indian convoys in the South Atlantic. After a successful frigate duel he is given a new frigate (HMS Savage) in 1800 and is part of a blockading squadron in the Bay of Biscay. The early spring of 1801 finds Lewrie in the Baltic commanding HMS Thermopylae, where he participates in the Battle of Copenhagen.

The Peace of Amiens leaves Lewrie ashore once more, but peace with France results in a horrible misadventure that results in the murder of his wife. In May 1803, Lewrie is back at sea in command of the 38-gun frigate HMS Reliant and is part of a squadron sent to the Caribbean as the Napoleonic Wars resume.

== Career ==
Lewrie's attraction is a series of continual struggles—at first glance, we find him in January 1780 abed with his half-sister by adoption as part of a thin plot by his father to get his 17-year-old bastard son out to sea (and thereby to acquire access to the estate of a grandmother that Lewrie knows nothing of). Throughout the first novel, The King's Coat, Lewrie tries to adapt to his unwelcome new life as a midshipman in the Royal Navy, and eventually finds that he does have some talent for it.

The second book in the series, The French Admiral, is set during the period August 1781 through January 1782 and covers the Battle of the Capes, the Siege of Yorktown, and the evacuation of Loyalist families from Wilmington, North Carolina. It begins with Lewrie still aboard HMS Desperate on the North American station. Lewrie's commander has developed a strong dislike for him because he has been apprised of the circumstances under which Lewrie was sent to the Navy. Matters are not helped when Lewrie and a companion connive their way onto shore in Charleston, South Carolina and end up in a brawl.

During a visit to a brothel, Lewrie becomes aware of the brutal internecine warfare being waged between Patriots and Loyalists in the Southern American colonies. Lewrie's applying himself to his duties, despite his desire to be out of the Navy, wins him supporters on board the Desperate and one asks his banker brother to find out more about Lewrie's parentage. Lewrie finds himself assigned ashore during the Siege of Yorktown and befriends two young officers in a Loyalist regiment, the Chiswicks, who will feature prominently in Lewrie's life.

The British Army, in Yorktown, Virginia is besieged by a combined American and French army, brought by the French Atlantic Fleet. When the Royal Navy does not drive the French off, the British Army is trapped. When it surrenders, it becomes the end of the American Revolution, as the British cannot afford to raise another army to continue to oppose the Americans.

Through a series of mishaps, Lewrie and two small boatloads of British seamen and Loyalist soldiers avoid the surrender of Lord Cornwallis and rejoin the fleet. This episode, combined with the damage to HMS Desperate's reputation by being the only British ship to break the French blockade of the Chesapeake Bay and escape capture or destruction, raises Lewrie's reputation in the eyes of his commander. As a reward he is promoted from midshipman to master's mate.

The King's Commission opens with the battle of St. Kitts and finds Lewrie back aboard the frigate HMS Desperate as the momentary favorite of the mercurial commander of Desperate. A promotion and transfer for Desperate's commander brings aboard his former mentor and now sworn enemy as the new first lieutenant. Lewrie fortuitously escapes this unhappy circumstance by being offered the opportunity to test for promotion to lieutenant and then by being one of only a few of the successful applicants to be immediately commissioned.

Lewrie's new ship is a small sloop commanded by a superannuated officer who is an accomplished seaman and leader. Under his tutelage, Lewrie begins a development into a skilled sea officer. For his part, he infuses his new captain with a sense of adventure and together they make the brig into a very efficient combatant. The prizes taken off Cuba introduce him to the horrors of slavery.

Ashore in Jamaica, Lewrie's pursuit of the wealthy young Lucy Beauman is scuttled through a series of scandals.

Lewrie is involved in escorting a British diplomatic mission to bribe Florida Indians to continue their fight against Spain and the new United States. He is wounded in a fight against the Spanish and their Indian allies and is present when Horatio Nelson suffers one of the few repulses of his career at Grand Turk. In the end, his concern for his wounded commander wins the admiration of Nelson and an offer of patronage from Admiral Lord Samuel Hood.

The King's Privateer finds Lewrie in London and the start of the peace. While attempting to use his influence to find employment for a friend, he finds himself offered employment as a lieutenant on what turns out to be a clandestine mission by the British government to suppress piracy against the ships of the British East India Company in the South China Sea. The offer is fortuitous because Lewrie's personal life is rapidly unraveling. This novel has Lewrie making his first contact with a British secret agent, Zacariah Twigg, and first crossing swords with an occasional future adversary, Captain Guillaume Choundas of the French Navy. He also connects again with his father, now pursuing life as an officer in the army of East India Company, and achieves something of a rapprochement and is able to gain promotion for his father. He cements his patronage relationship with Admiral Lord Samuel Hood and extends it to include First Lord of the Admiralty, Richard Howe.

As a reward for his service in the Far East, Lewrie is given command of a small vessel and dispatched once more to the Caribbean in The Gun Ketch; he also marries Caroline Chiswick. In the Bahamas, Lewrie experiences the futility of attempting to enforce the Navigation Act and rampant local corruption which turns a blind eye to piracy and shipwrecking. Lewrie places his career, and life of his new wife and infant son, in jeopardy by pursuing a piracy ring and exposing its leaders.

Following several years of peaceful life as a well-off tenant farmer in England with three children, Lewrie is recalled to active duty in January 1793 as the French Revolutionary Wars begin to finally draw England in as a combatant. This adventure (HMS Cockerel) sees Lewrie in service with the Impress Service (as England ramps up to a larger navy), as the first lieutenant aboard a frigate sent into the Mediterranean, and to the siege of Toulon. Lambdin now takes to giving Lewrie the chance to meet more famous historical figures, including Napoleon Bonaparte, Emma Hamilton, King Ferdinand IV of Naples, and sundry of Britain's more famous admirals including then-captain Horatio Nelson. His actions while escorting a convoy of French Royalists from Toulon to Gibraltar win him a promotion to commander; an advancement on the way to status as a post-captain.

Following his escape from Toulon, Lewrie's next adventures are continued in A King's Commander, where Lewrie is promoted to that rank and given a proper ship (HMS Jester) of his own to command. On his way to his next station in the Mediterranean, he stumbles onto the opening stages of the Glorious First of June battle. He serves under the less than able Admiral William Hotham in the Mediterranean as part of a squadron commanded by Captain Horatio Nelson off Italy's west coast as the army of Revolutionary France pushes into Italy. Jester's Fortune closes this chapter of history as Lewrie serves in the Adriatic with a small squadron attempting to ensure that Balkan naval stores are not supplied to France. As a backdrop, Napoleon overruns Italy and forces Admiral John Jervis to abandon the Mediterranean due to a lack of friendly ports.

The Royal Navy had been using ports in Italy for water, food, and naval supplies, but over the course of 1794–1796, these were lost due to French influence or invasion. The Royal Navy fell back to Gibraltar.

King's Captain sees Lewrie involved in the Battle of Cape St Vincent just before being promoted to the coveted position of post-captain and given command of a brand new frigate... which he boards on the eve of the Nore Mutiny. In Sea of Grey, after being wounded at the Battle of Camperdown, Lewrie spends time ashore where his domestic life has disintegrated when Caroline learned of his many infidelities, courtesy of anonymous letters that seem distressingly well-informed about the 'Ram-Cat's' philanderings. In the meantime, he and his frigate HMS Proteus are dispatched to the Caribbean once more. While coping with the aftermath of an outbreak of yellow fever in his crew, Lewrie conspires with an old friend (Kit Cashman, who he first encounters in 1782) to accept a dozen runaway slaves from Jamaica in his crew.

In Havoc's Sword, Lewrie and HMS Proteus are still in the Caribbean, where he gets to confront Choundas yet again and to cooperate with the rising US Navy. The same arena is still in play for The Captain's Vengeance, where Lewrie embarks on a secret mission to the Spanish port of New Orleans to deal with French Acadian pirates... and finds that one of them is a very attractive and astonishingly liberated young woman.

With A King's Trade, Lewrie is in deep trouble once more as the conversion of some black slaves to Royal Navy seamen comes back to haunt him. Legal action beckons, forcing Lewrie into the arms of William Wilberforce and the Abolitionist movement. In the meantime, Lewrie must escort a trade convoy to South Africa, developing a—so far—chaste relationship with a young Russian woman and a ferocious encounter with a marauding French frigate.

Troubled Waters takes things to the spring of 1800, where Lewrie is back in England as a wealthy hero following his cruises with HMS Proteus; but a date in court for the theft of slaves awaits. His attempted reconciliation with Caroline goes off the rails, following the arrival of another anonymous letter. While awaiting his trial, he is sent out with his new frigate, HMS Savage, to the blockade squadron off the estuary of the Loire.

With The Baltic Gambit, Lewrie is ashore on half-pay at the start of 1801, but at least acquitted of the charges relating to slave theft. Bored and idle, he eventually takes up a relationship with an attractive young prostitute (ending two years of celibacy) while also wrapping up the issue of the anonymous letters. As the anti-British Neutral League of Denmark, Sweden, Prussia and Russia threatens British interests, the Admiralty puts him in command of another frigate and sends him into the Baltic. Lewrie is sent to pick his way through the ice and events soon lead him to the Battle of Copenhagen.

In King, Ship and Sword, Lewrie is home once more, following the outbreak of Peace (Treaty of Amiens (1802)). He returns to the family home and slowly works his way towards healing the rift with his wife. As a result of both the political and his personal peace, a second honeymoon in Paris ensues, which ends in disaster. Lewrie's old French enemies become aware of him and he has to flee, but Caroline is killed during the escape. After months of grieving at home, Lewrie is recalled to service as the new captain of a 38-gun frigate and returns to sea ready to kill as many Frenchmen as possible. His second son, Hugh, is found a place on a friend's ship as a midshipman; but Lewrie is stunned when his oldest son Sewallis also finds a place for himself as a midshipman.

In The Invasion Year, Lewrie becomes (only partially willingly) involved in the evacuation of French civilians from the slave rebellion on Hispaniola before being recalled to England, where he is rewarded for his part in the naval action described at the end of King, Ship, and Sword by being made Knight of the Bath and—shockingly—Baronet. At the reception afterward, he meets Percy Viscount Stangbourne and, more importantly, Percy's sister Lydia. After only a few days leave, Captain Sir Alan Lewrie is sent on a secret mission to test a new naval technology being called the "torpedo".

In Hostile Shores, Lewrie is assigned as naval escort for the British expeditions to take the Cape of Good Hope from the Dutch, and then to take Buenos Aires from Spain. In a small naval action related to the British holding the River Plate, Lewrie is badly wounded, and then returns to England.

By mid-1807, (in The King's Marauder) having spent half a year regaining his health, Lewrie once more presents himself at the Admiralty seeking active assignment. He is ordered to command HMS Sapphire, a small (50-gun) two-decked ship of the line rather than another fleet frigate. He is assigned to Gibraltar, assigned to the Foreign Office's man (spy in residence) there to cause mayhem, or any other activity to support the Foreign Office. This continues in Kings and Emperors through the beginning of 1809, when Lewrie helps evacuate the British Army after the Battle of Corunna.

Given the chance, Lewrie is lazy, casual, and inclined to be good humoured and amusing. However, what was initially a façade as an active and conscientious naval officer has actually become real over the course of the novels. Lewrie becomes an imaginative and aggressive officer, a capable leader, and a competent seaman. He is no longer dominated by his womanizing. He is also lucky, and encourages the belief – among the more superstitious of his sailors – that he is under the favor of the ancient God of the Sea, Lir. At times, he almost believes this himself.

Lambdin has an interesting character here, and many more years of fighting await. Choundas, at least, is dead but there are children (legitimate and otherwise) to be seen to and professional rivals to be addressed.

== The Alan Lewrie novels ==
Lewrie was the protagonist of some twenty-five novels from 1989 to 2019.

It was reported that a 26th novel was in progress with an anticipated publication date of January 2022. However, this report predated Lambdin's death in July 2021.

1. The King's Coat (1989)
2. The French Admiral (1990)
3. The King's Commission (1991)
4. The King's Privateer (1992)
5. The Gun Ketch (1993)
6. H.M.S. Cockerel (1995)
7. A King's Commander (1997)
8. Jester's Fortune (1999)
9. King's Captain (2000)
10. Sea of Grey (2002)
11. Havoc's Sword (2003)
12. The Captain's Vengeance (2004)
13. A King's Trade (2006)
14. Troubled Waters (2008)
15. The Baltic Gambit (2009)
16. King, Ship, and Sword (2010)
17. The Invasion Year (2011)
18. Reefs and Shoals (2012)
19. Hostile Shores (2013)
20. The King's Marauder (2014)
21. Kings and Emperors (2015)
22. A Hard, Cruel Shore (2016)
23. A Fine Retribution (2017)
24. An Onshore Storm (2018)
25. Much Ado about Lewrie (2019)

=== Collection ===
- For King and Country (omnibus) (1994)

=== Short story ===
- Lewrie and the Hogsheads (2012)
