= Robert Bage =

English businessman and novelist (1730–1801)

- Born: 11 March 1730; Darley Abbey, Derbyshire, England
- Died: 1 November 1801 (aged 71)
- Occupations: Businessman, novelist
- Notable work: Hermsprong (1796)

Robert Bage (11 March 1730 – 1 September 1801) was an English businessman and novelist.

== Biography ==
Born in Darley Abbey, near Derby, Bage was the son of a paper-maker who had four wives, the first of whom was Bage's mother. She died soon after his birth. Bage received his early education at a common school in Derby, where he was an excellent student. He attained a working knowledge of Latin by the age of seven. He was given his training as a paper-maker while he was an apprentice to his father. At the age of 23, Bage married a beautiful and wealthy young woman. With the boost in his finances he set up a paper-manufacturing business in Elford, Staffordshire, which he continued until his death.

Bage was a skilled businessman and his smooth running of his business allowed him time for intellectual pursuits. He learned the French language on his own, through books, and studied mathematics. In 1765 he entered into a partnership in an iron foundry with three other men including Erasmus Darwin. After 14 years in business, the partnership was terminated, leaving Bage with a loss of more than 1,000 pounds. This was a considerable loss, and Bage decided to begin his career in literature partly to make up for it. He published his first novel, Mount Henneth, in 1781.

Bage left Elford in 1793 and resided nearby in Tamworth. He died in 1801, and was survived by his wife and two of their sons. Another son, John, had died as a young man, a great affliction to Bage. His oldest son, Charles, settled in Shrewsbury, where he became a cotton manufacturer, and his youngest son, Edward, became a surgeon.

== Literary work and public life ==
It was not until he was 53 that he took to literature; however, in the 15 years following, he produced six novels, of which Sir Walter Scott said that "strong mind, playful fancy, and extensive knowledge are everywhere apparent." Scott included Mount Henneth (1781), Barham Downs (1784), and James Wallace (1792) in his series of Ballantyne novels. Bage was brought up as a Quaker, but he became a philosophical and religious radical after the French Revolution. He advocated democracy and equality (the abolition of the peerage), as well as the abolition of institutional religion. A member of the Derby Philosophical Society, he was also associated with the Lunar Society of Birmingham.

The work for which he is chiefly read today is Hermsprong, his last novel. Although regarded as radical at the time, it is somewhat disjointed. The first half has strong philosophical content, but in the second half the book, whilst retaining a strong satirical element, becomes more of a sentimental novel. The philosophical challenge of the novel is that it concerns an American who has been raised entirely by American Indians, without either formal education or religion. With only nature to teach him, he sees through the hypocrisy of society and English manners. It is notable for pursuing the theme of the noble savage and, in particular, "nativism" or innatism.

== Bibliography ==
- Mount Henneth. A novel in a series of letters (1781)
  - Vol. I
  - Vol. II
- Barham Downs (1784)
  - Vol. I
  - Vol. II
- The Fair Syrian (1787)
  - Volume I
  - Vol.II
- James Wallace (1788)
  - Vol. I
  - Vol. II
  - Vol. III
- Man as he is (1792)
  - Volume I
  - Volume II
  - Volume III
  - Volume IV
- Hermsprong (1796)

== Sources ==
- Scott, Walter (1870). "Robert Bage". Lives of the Eminent Novelists and Dramatists. London: Frederick Warne. pp. 605–617.
