= Saul David =

British academic

Professor Saul David
- Born: Julian Saul David; 1966 (age 59–60); Monmouth, Wales, United Kingdom
- Education: Ampleforth College
- Alma mater: Edinburgh University; University of Glasgow
- Occupations: Academic; Military historian; Broadcaster

Julian Saul David (born 1966) is a British academic military historian and broadcaster. He is best known for his work on the Indian Rebellion of 1857 and the Anglo-Zulu War, as well as for presenting and appearing in documentaries on British television covering imperial and military themes.

Of Armenian ancestry through his father and originally named Davidian, David was born in Monmouth, Monmouthshire, Wales, and was educated at various local schools in Herefordshire and Monmouthshire before studying for his A-levels at Ampleforth College. He studied for an MA in history at Edinburgh University, for which he was awarded an upper-second class degree, and read for his PhD at the University of Glasgow. He was Visiting Professor of Military History at the University of Hull for 2007 – 2008. In 2009, he was appointed professor of Military History at the University of Buckingham and has since been directing the institution's MA programme.

David's books include The Indian Mutiny, which was shortlisted for the Duke of Westminster's Medal for Military Literature, Military Blunders, Zulu: the Heroism and Tragedy of the Zulu War of 1879 (a Waterstone's Military History Book of the Year) and Zulu and Victoria’s Wars. He has presented and appeared in a number of BBC programmes, including Zulu: The True Story, Time Commanders, The Greatest Knight (2008) and Bullets, Boots and Bandages: How to really win at war (2012).

== Bibliography ==
=== Non-fiction ===
- David, Saul (1997). The Homicidal Earl: The Life of Lord Cardigan. London: Little, Brown. ISBN 978-0-31664165-4.
- —— (1997). Military Blunders: The How and Why of Military Failure. London: Robinson. ISBN 978-1-85487918-9.
- —— (1998). Prince of Pleasure: The Prince of Wales and the Making of the Regency. London: Little, Brown. ISBN 978-0-31664616-1.
- —— (2002). The Indian Mutiny: 1857. London: Viking. ISBN 978-0-67091137-0.
- —— (2004). Zulu: The Heroism and Tragedy of the Zulu War. London: Viking. ISBN 978-0-67091474-6.
- —— (2004). Churchill's Sacrifice of the Highland Division: France 1940. London: Brassey's (UK) Ltd. ISBN 978-1-85753-378-1.
- —— (2005). Mutiny at Salerno: An Injustice Exposed. London: Conway Publishing. ISBN 978-1-84486-019-7.
- —— (2006). Victoria's Wars: The Rise of Empire. London: Viking. ISBN 978-0-67091138-7.
- —— (2013). 100 Days to Victory: How the Great War Was Fought and Won. London: Hodder & Stoughton. ISBN 978-1-44478637-8.
- —— (2015). Operation Thunderbolt: Flight 139 and the Raid on Entebbe Airport. London: Hodder & Stoughton. ISBN 978-1-44476-251-8.
- —— (2019). The Force: The Legendary Special Ops Unit and WWII's Mission Impossible. New York: Hachette Books. ISBN 978-0-316-41453-1.
- —— (2020). Crucible of Hell: Okinawa, the Last Great Battle of the Second World War. London: William Collins. ISBN 978-0-00834248-7.
- —— (2021). SBS: Silent Warriors, the Authorised Wartime History of the Special Boat Service from the Secret SBS Archives. London: William Collins. ISBN 978-0008394523.
- —— (2023). Devil Dogs: First In, Last Out - King Company from Guadalcanal to the Shores of Japan. London: William Collins. ISBN 978-0-00-839579-7.
- —— (2024). Sky Warriors: British Airborne Forces in the Second World War. London: William Collins. ISBN 978-0-00-852220-9.
- —— (2025). Tunisgrad: Victory in Africa. London: William Collins. ISBN 978-0-00-865381-1.

=== Fiction ===
- David, Saul (2009). Zulu Hart. London: Hodder & Stoughton. ISBN 978-0-340-95362-4.
- David, Saul (2010). Hart of Empire. London: Hodder & Stoughton. ISBN 978-0-340-95365-5.
- David, Saul (2018). The Prince and the Whitechapel Murders. London: Hodder & Stoughton. ISBN 978-0-34095368-6.
