= Zulu Hart =

2009 novel by Saul David

- First edition
- Author: Saul David
- Language: English
- Series: George Hart Series
- Genre: Historical Novel
- Publisher: Hodder & Stoughton
- Publication date: 2009
- Publication place: United Kingdom
- Media type: Paperback
- Pages: 470
- ISBN: 978-0-340-95362-4
- Followed by: Hart of Empire

Zulu Hart is a historical novel by British author Saul David, set in the late Victorian Era, and focussed around the early military career of its eponym, George Hart. It is the first novel in the George Hart series.

== Plot ==
George Hart is the bastard son of a pillar of the British military establishment and a half Irish, half Zulu actress. He is bullied at school for his dark looks, an experience which teaches him how to fight. When he is eighteen he learns that his mysterious father has promised him a vast inheritance if he can accede to a suitable rank in the British Army. He proceeds to the military academy, and is once more the source of animosity over the colour of his skin.

Set up by a group of officers he is forced to leave the army, whereby he travels to South Africa. Conflict is brewing between the British authorities and the Zulus, and he is quickly enlisted to fight for the army under the command of Lord Chelmsford. Hart witnesses a massacre, and returns to London to be debriefed by the Duke of Cambridge himself.

== Critical reception ==
The novel received mixed reviews. The Observer noted that "while the story is stuffed full of period detail, it is too often buried under clunky prose", whilst History Today was more favourable.
