= Lord Ramage =

Nicholas, Lord Ramage
- Created by: Dudley Pope

In-universe information
- Gender: Male
- Title: Lord Ramage
- Occupation: Naval officer
- Family: Ramage Family
- Spouse: Sarah Ramage
- Nationality: English

Nicholas, Lord Ramage is a fictional character, the protagonist of a series of sea novels written by Dudley Pope. Ramage was an officer in the Royal Navy during the Napoleonic Wars. He is a contemporary of Horatio Hornblower, but unlike the latter, who never fought in a large fleet battle, Ramage participated in both the Battle of Cape St. Vincent and the Battle of Trafalgar.

== Early life ==
^{This section contains information on Ramage's life before the commencement of the Lord Ramage Novels. For information after this period, see the respective summaries of the books.}
Nicholas Ramage was born in 1775 at Blazey Hall in Cornwall, the eldest son of the Earl of Blazey. Nicholas' father was a Vice-Admiral who was court martialled (some sympathetic colleagues felt unjustly so) and Nicholas is burdened by this legacy. Ramage's mother was fond of traveling and took Ramage to Tuscany to live in 1777, when his father departed to assume naval command in North America. They returned to England for his father's court martial in 1782 and because of the notoriety surrounding his father's court martial returned to Tuscany in 1783 where Ramage remained until he joined the navy in 1788 at age 13. Despite his father's disgrace, Ramage retained significant patrons within the navy enabling him to be promoted to lieutenant at age 20, the earliest age possible.

== Commands ==
Ship	Rate	Guns	Main armament	Book	Notional Year	End of commission	Fictional?
HMS Sibella	Frigate	28	12pdr guns, carronades	Ramage	1796	Sunk	Yes
Kathleen	Cutter	10	10*6pdr carronades	Ramage	1796	Sunk	Yes
Triton	Brig	10	10*12pdr carronades	Ramage and the Freebooters	1797	Wrecked	Yes
HMS Juno	Frigate	32	26*12pdr guns, 6*6pdr guns	Ramage's Diamond	1801		Yes
HMS Calypso	Frigate	36	36*12pdr guns, 6*12pdr carronades	Ramage's Mutiny	1801		Yes
HMS Dido	Ship of the line	74	28*32pdr, 30*24pdr, 16*12pdr guns, 8*12pdr carronades	Ramage and the Dido	1807		Yes

== Novels Featured in ==
1. Ramage (1965)
2. Ramage and the Drumbeat (a.k.a. Drumbeat) (1968)
3. Ramage and the Freebooters (a.k.a. The Triton Brig) (1969)
4. Governor Ramage R.N. (1973)
5. Ramage's Prize (1974)
6. Ramage and the Guillotine (1975)
7. Ramage's Diamond (1976) HMS Diamond Rock
8. Ramage's Mutiny (1977)
9. Ramage and the Rebels (1978)
10. The Ramage Touch (1979)
11. Ramage's Signal (1980)
12. Ramage and the Renegades (1981)
13. Ramage's Devil (1982)
14. Ramage's Trial (1984)
15. Ramage's Challenge (1985)
16. Ramage at Trafalgar (1986)
17. Ramage and the Saracens (1988)
18. Ramage and the Dido (1989)

== See also ==
- Jack Aubrey
- Horatio Hornblower
- The Bolitho novels
