= Hermsprong =

1796 philosophical novel by Robert Bage

Hermsprong: Or, Man As He is Not
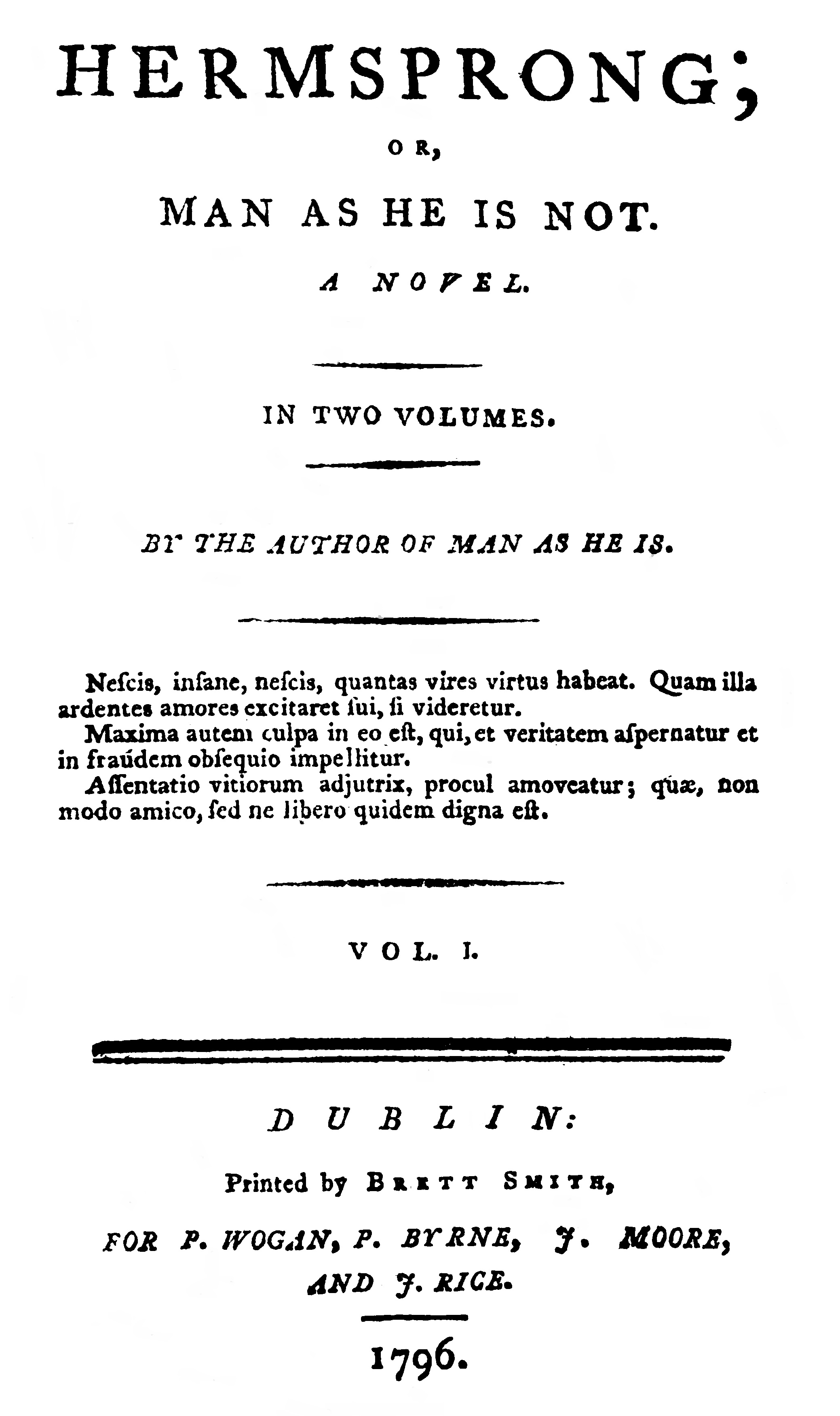
- First edition title page.
- Author: Robert Bage
- Language: English
- Publication date: 1796

Hermsprong: or, Man As He is Not is a 1796 philosophical novel by Robert Bage. It is the main work for which Bage is remembered and was his last novel. He had previously published a novel entitled Man As He Is.

The novel was regarded as radical at the time it was published. It was shaped by the revolutionary ideas of its period and expresses some feminist views through two of its characters, the eponymous hero and Maria Fluart. The views voiced by Fluart were applauded by Mary Wollstonecraft.

The novel has a somewhat disjointed structure. The first half has strong philosophical content, but in the second half the book, whilst retaining a strong satirical element, becomes more of a sentimental novel.

The philosophical challenge of the novel is that it concerns an American who has been raised entirely by American Indians, without either formal education or religion. With only nature to teach him, he sees through the hypocrisy of English society and manners. The novel is notable for pursuing the theme of the noble savage and, in particular, nativism. Throughout the novel Bage repeatedly uses the terms "pride" and "prejudice" in senses similar to those explored by Jane Austen in Pride and Prejudice.

== Editions ==
- 1796. Hermsprong: or, Man as He is Not, a novel in two volumes by the author of Man as He Is. Printer and publishers: printed by Brett Smith, for P. Wogan, P. Byrne, J. Moore, and J. Rice, 1796
- 1799, corrected.
- 1828, Chiswick Press.
- 1951, London: Turnstile Press, ed. Vaughan Wilkins.
- 1960, London:Folio Society, ill. Cecil Keeling.
- 1971, Garland Press, facsimile of 1796 edition.
- 1982, Pennsylvania State University Press, ed. Stuart Tave.
- 1985, Oxford: The World's Classics, Oxford University Press, ed. Peter Faulkner.
