= Dewey Lambdin =

American writer (1946–2021)

- Born: Dewey Whitley Lambdin II; January 26, 1945
- Died: July 26, 2021 (aged 76)
- Education: Montana State University
- Occupation: Author (Historical fiction)
- Parent(s): Dewey Lambdin; Edda Lambdin

Dewey Lambdin (January 26, 1945 – July 26, 2021) was an American nautical historical novelist. He was best known for his Alan Lewrie naval adventure series, spanning the American Revolution and the Napoleonic Wars. Besides the Alan Lewrie series, he is also the author of What Lies Buried: a novel of Old Cape Fear.

The son of a U.S. Navy officer, Lambdin attended the University of Tennessee where he had his first published story appear in the Thorn Vault. Lambdin graduated with a degree in Film & TV Production from Montana State University in 1969. After graduating he moved to Memphis, Tennessee where he worked as a producer/director production manager and senior director/writer/ producer for local television stations, and later in Nashville in advertising.

After being laid off when the advertising company he worked for failed, he returned to his early interest in writing fiction with his creation of Lewrie in The King's Coat in 1988, published in 1989.

== Alan Lewrie books ==
1. The King's Coat (1989)
2. The French Admiral (1990)
3. The King's Commission (1991)
4. The King's Privateer (1992)
5. The Gun Ketch (1993)
6. H.M.S. Cockerel (1995)
7. A King's Commander (1997)
8. Jester's Fortune (1999)
9. King's Captain (2000)
10. Sea of Grey (2002)
11. Havoc's Sword (2003)
12. The Captain's Vengeance (2004)
13. A King's Trade (2006)
14. Troubled Waters (2008)
15. The Baltic Gambit (2009)
16. King, Ship and Sword (2010)
17. The Invasion Year (2011)
18. Reefs and Shoals (2012)
19. Hostile Shores (2013)
20. The King's Marauder (2014)
21. Kings and Emperors (2015)
22. A Hard, Cruel Shore (2016)
23. A Fine Retribution (2017)
24. An Onshore Storm (2018)
25. Much Ado About Lewrie (2019)

=== Short story ===
- "Lewrie and the Hogsheads" (2012)

== Other novels ==
- What Lies Buried: A Novel of Old Cape Fear (2005)
