= Dudley Pope =

British writer

Dudley Bernard Egerton Pope (29 December 1925 – 25 April 1997) was a British writer of both nautical fiction and history, most notable for his Lord Ramage series of historical novels. Greatly inspired by C.S. Forester, Pope was one of the most successful authors to explore the genre of nautical fiction, often compared to Patrick O'Brian.

== Life ==
Dudley Pope was born in Ashford, Kent. By concealing his age he joined the Home Guard aged 14 and at age 16 joined the merchant navy as a cadet. His ship was torpedoed the next year (1942). Afterwards, he spent two weeks in a lifeboat with the few other survivors. After he was invalided out the only obvious sign of the injuries he had suffered was a joint missing from one finger due to gangrene. Pope then went to work for a Kentish newspaper, then in 1944 moved to The Evening News in London, where he was the naval and defence correspondent. From there he turned to reading and writing naval history.

His first book, Flag 4, was published in 1954, followed by several other historical accounts. C. S. Forester, the creator of the famed Horatio Hornblower novels, encouraged Pope to add fiction to his repertoire. In 1965, Ramage appeared, the first of what was to become an 18-novel series.

He took to living on boats from 1953 on; when he married Kay Pope in 1954, they lived on a William Fife 8-meter named Concerto, then at Porto Santo Stefano, Italy in 1959 with a 42-foot ketch Tokay. In 1963 he and Kay moved to a 53-foot cutter Golden Dragon, on which they moved to Barbados in 1965. In 1968 they moved onto a 54-foot wooden yacht named Ramage, aboard which he wrote all of his stories until 1985. Pope died 25 April 1997 in Marigot, Saint Martin. Both his wife and his daughter, Jane Victoria survive him.

== Bibliography ==
=== Ramage series ===
Most of the novels are based on real events in the late 18th and early 19th centuries. The year of these events is shown before the book title. The year of publication between 1965 and 1989 is shown after the title.

1. 1796 – Ramage (1965)
2. 1797 – Ramage and the Drumbeat (1967)
3. 1797 – Ramage and the Freebooters [published in the U.S. as The Triton Brig] (1969)
4. 1797 – Governor Ramage R.N. (1973)
5. 1798 – Ramage's Prize (1974)
6. 1798 – Ramage and the Guillotine (1975)
7. 1799 – Ramage's Diamond (1976)
8. 1799 – Ramage's Mutiny (1977)
9. 1800 – Ramage and the Rebels (1978)
10. 1800 – The Ramage Touch (1979)
11. 1800 – Ramage's Signal (1980)
12. 1802 – Ramage and the Renegades (1981)
13. 1803 – Ramage's Devil (1982)
14. 1803 – Ramage's Trial (1984)
15. 1803 – Ramage's Challenge (1985)
16. 1805 – Ramage at Trafalgar (1986)
17. 1806 – Ramage and the Saracens (1988)
18. 1806 – Ramage and the Dido (1989)

=== Yorke series ===
1. Buccaneer (1981)
2. Admiral (1982)
3. Galleon (1986)
4. Corsair (1987)

=== Other novels ===
1. Convoy (1979)
2. Decoy (1983)

=== Nonfiction ===
1. Flag 4: The Battle of Coastal Forces in the Mediterranean (1954)
2. The Battle of the River Plate (1956)
3. 73 North: The Battle of the Barents Sea 1942 (1958)
4. Decision at Trafalgar (1959)
5. England Expects (1959)
6. The Black Ship (1963)
7. Harry Morgan's Way: Biography of Sir Henry Morgan 1635–1688 (1977), Martin Secker & Warburg Ltd, ISBN 0-436-37735-7
8. The Great Gamble: Nelson at Copenhagen (1978)
9. Life in Nelson's Navy (1981)
10. The Devil Himself: The Mutiny of 1800 (1988) – this is the story of HMS Danae and the mutiny aboard her.
11. At 12 Mr Byng Was Shot (1962)
12. Guns (1965)
